= Cirrus aero engines =

Series of British aero engines

The Cirrus and Hermes or Cirrus-Hermes are a series of British aero engines manufactured, under various changes of ownership, from the 1920s until the 1950s. The engines were all air-cooled, four-cylinder inline types, with earlier ones upright and later designs inverted.

The first Cirrus design was created for the planned de Havilland Moth light aeroplane and, when it appeared in 1925, created the market for private flying. It and its successors were widely used for private and light aircraft from that moment on.

== Design and development ==
=== ADC ===
The Cirrus engine originated in Geoffrey de Havilland's 1924 quest for a powerplant suited to a light two-seat sports biplane which would become the de Havilland Moth. No suitable engine, combining a suitable power output with light weight, low cost and high reliability existed at the time. The Aircraft Disposal Company (also known as Airdisco and ADC) were producing the low-cost Airdisco V8 which had been developed by Frank Halford from their large stocks of war surplus Renault V8 aero engines. The Renault was renowned for its reliability. De Havilland realised that half of this engine would make an air-cooled four-cylinder inline engine of just the right size and at low cost. He persuaded Halford to undertake its design and development.

The cylinders, pistons, con-rods and gearing were taken from the Renault, with the valve gear based on the Airdisco, and a new five-bearing crankshaft and cast crankcase were designed. Developing 60 horsepower (45 kW) in normal flight it became the first Cirrus engine, and the first air-cooled four-cylinder inline aero engine, to go into quantity production.

The Cirrus was launched onto the market in the de Havilland Cirrus Moth, first in a long line of Moths, in 1925. The engine proved to be ideal for private light aircraft and it created a new era of private flying in the UK, in both the Cirrus Moth and other similar aircraft. It was simple enough to be understood and looked after by the private owner, while its reliability made private flying safe for the first time. Moreover it achieved these at an affordable cost.

The uprated Cirrus II, with slightly greater displacement, delivered 75 horsepower (56 kW) from 1926. Halford ended his association with ADC at the end of the year, but development continued. The Cirrus III was introduced in 1928 with even greater displacement and power of 85 horsepower (63 kW).

=== Cirrus Aero Engines ===
As ADC began to run out of the Renault engines in 1928, Cirrus Aero Engines Limited was formed at Croydon to manufacture the Cirrus models from scratch.

Although Halford was no longer associated with it (having gone off to develop the next-generation but otherwise similar de Havilland Gipsy series), the Cirrus company continued to develop new models, with the uprated Hermes appearing in 1929. It had been developed by ADC to provide more power than even the Cirrus III. Overall slightly shorter but with much the same overall weight, it delivered 105 horsepower (78 kW).

=== American Cirrus Engines (ACE) ===
American Cirrus Engines, Inc. was a subsidiary of Allied Motor Industries, Inc. set up at Belleville, N.J. in November 1928, initially to manufacture the Cirrus III under license. Having developed the American Cirrus III engine at New Jersey, the company moved to Marysville, Michigan, where it set up production. The engine was rated at 95 horsepower (71 kW) at 2100 revolutions per minute. The company became known as the A.C.E. Corporation.

A new range of 95 horsepower (71 kW) inverted engines was branded Hi-Drive and appeared under names such as the Hi-Drive Cirrus III and Hi-Drive Ensign. The Hi-Drive was supplied in direct and geared drive options, and was designed to accept a de Palma supercharger for increased performance.

In 1935 A.C.E. was taken over by Menasco, who developed the inverted engine as the Pirate, sold from 1936, and a six-cylinder derivative as the Buccaneer.

=== Cirrus-Hermes ===
The independent Cirrus-Hermes Engineering Company was formed in 1931. The Hermes models I, II, III and IV were produced ranging in power from 105 hp to 140 hp depending on type.

While the Hermes II and III were uprights like their predecessors, the Hermes II B introduced a major change with the cylinders being inverted for the first time. The resulting high propeller line allowed the top of the engine to be lowered, which significantly improved the pilot's view in a single-engined type. All subsequent models would be inverted.

By this time C. S. Napier, son of Montague Napier, had joined as technical director and engine designer. He began work on two new engines but before they could be finished the company came under new management.

=== Cirrus Hermes ===
In 1934 the company was taken over by the Blackburn Aeroplane & Motor Company and moved to Brough in Yorkshire. Napier remained technical director and, while he completed the development and initial sales of the Cirrus Minor and Cirrus Major, Blackburn kept Cirrus Hermes as a separate company (though without the hyphen in its name). Although completely new designs, they were of broadly similar layout to the previous inverted engines, with the Minor in the 70-80 hp class and the Major giving 125 hp in normal use. Coming to the market almost together in 1935, they rationalised and replaced the previous ranges.

=== Blackburn ===
Once the new Cirrus engines were established, in 1937 the company became the Cirrus Engine Division of Blackburn, which itself had been incorporated into Blackburn Aircraft Limited.

The Blackburn Cirrus Midget was a smaller version developed in 1938 but it failed to enter production.

During and after WWII Blackburn produced uprated versions of the Cirrus Minor and Major. In 1948 it introduced the Blackburn Cirrus Bombardier with fuel injection and a higher compression ratio, giving increased output.

When Blackburn Aircraft merged with General Aircraft Limited (GAL) in 1949, becoming Blackburn & General Aircraft Limited, it continued to market the Minor, Major and Bombardier range until the late 1950s.

== Variants ==
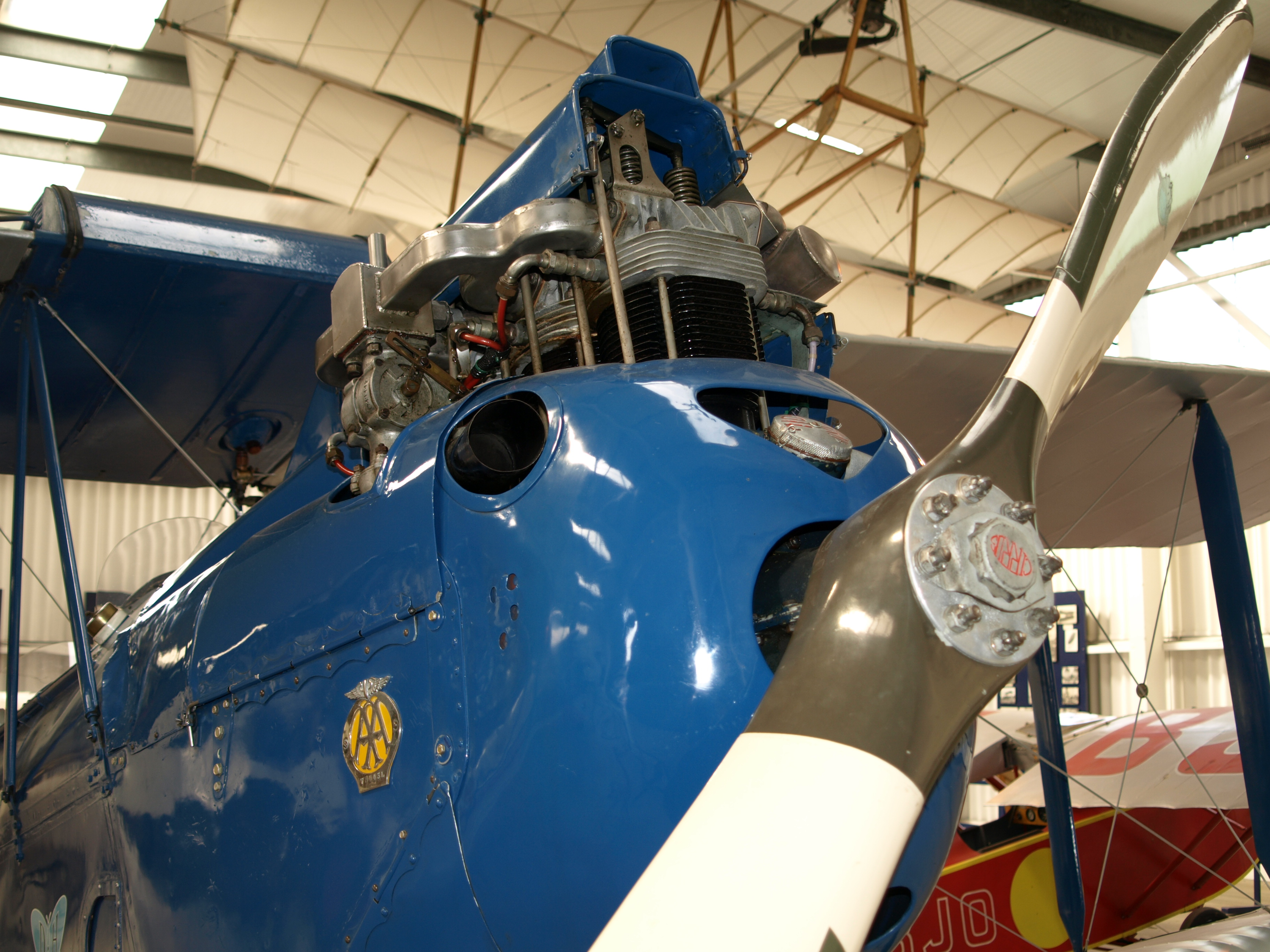
Cirrus III fitted to a de Havilland DH.60 Moth

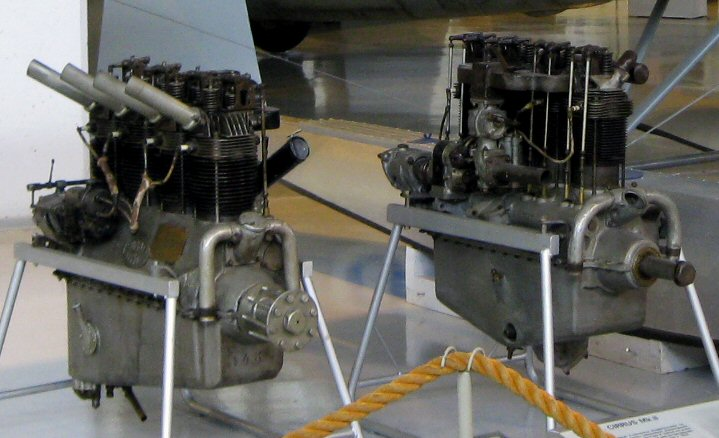
Hermes I (left) and Cirrus III (right)

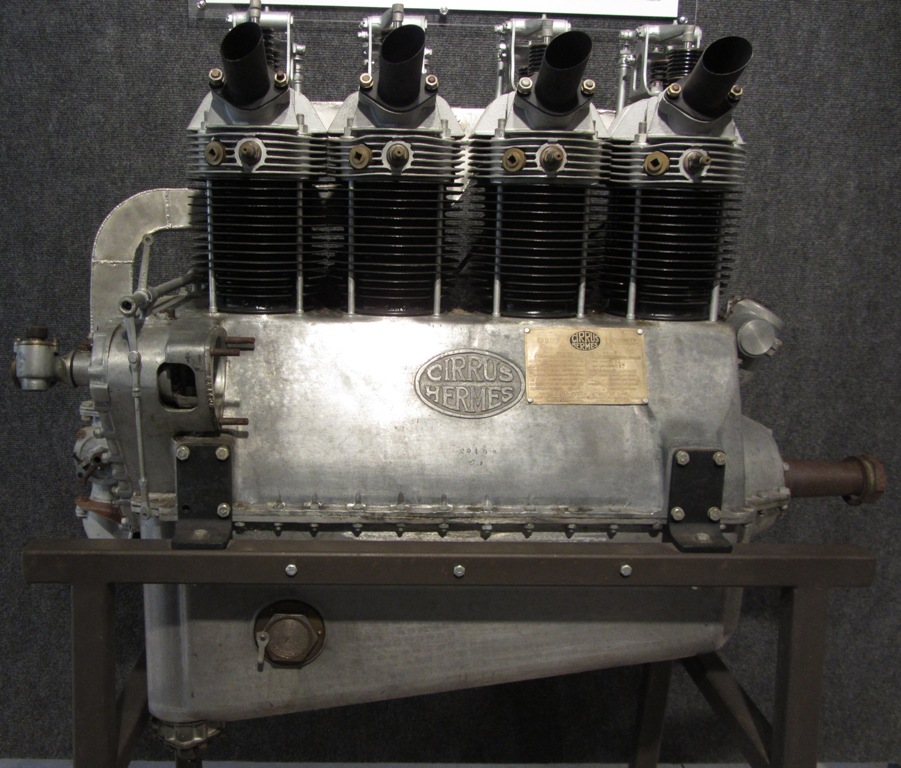
A Cirrus Hermes

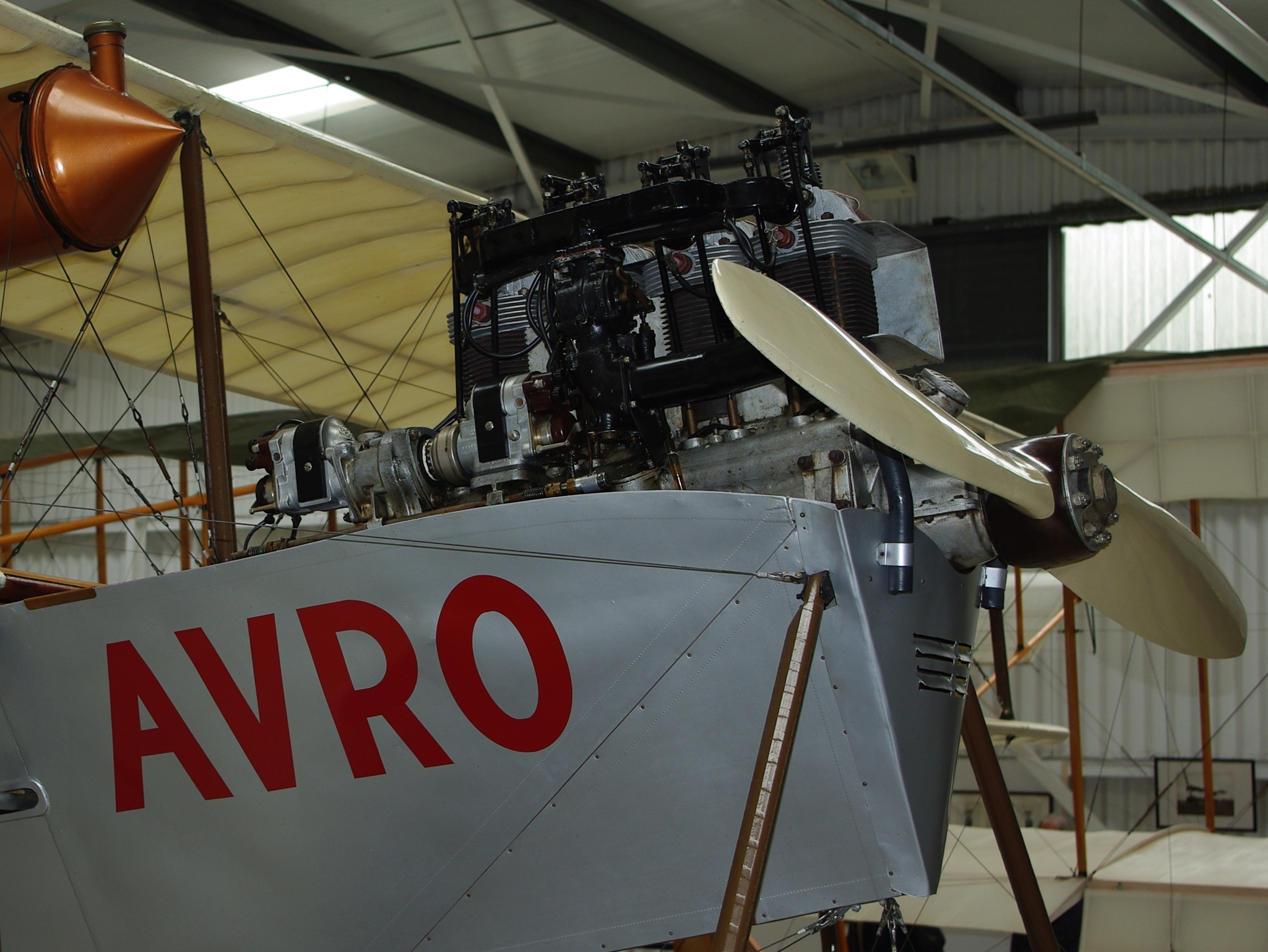
Hermes I in Roe IV replica

Cirrus I
(1925)
Cirrus II
(1926)
Cirrus III
(1929) Introduced by ADC, also manufactured by Cirrus Aero Engines.
American Cirrus III
(1929) Improved variant of the Cirrus III, built under license.
American Cirrus Hi-drive
Inverted, with direct and geared drive options.
Hermes
(1929). Later as Hermes I. Introduced by Cirrus Aero Engines, also manufactured by Cirrus-Hermes.
Hermes II
(1930).
Hermes IIB
(1932). First inverted engine
Hermes III
(1932). Upright
Hermes IV and IV A
(1930). Inverted. The Hermes IV A with opposite-handed rotation was introduced around 1934.
Cirrus Minor
(1935). Later as Cirrus Minor I. Inverted. Introduced by Cirrus Hermes, also manufactured by Blackburn.
Cirrus Minor 100 hp
(1944). Inverted.
Cirrus Minor II
(1945). Inverted.
Cirrus Major
(1935). Later as Cirrus Major I. Inverted. Introduced by Cirrus Hermes, also manufactured by Blackburn.
Cirrus Major 150 hp
Inverted.
Cirrus Major II
(1945). Inverted.
Cirrus Major III
(1945) Inverted.
Blackburn Cirrus Midget
(1938). Prototype. Not manufactured.
Blackburn Cirrus Bombardier
(1948). Fuel injection.

== Applications ==
List from Lumsden except where noted. The list includes trial installations where a different engine was principally adopted.

=== Cirrus ===
==== Cirrus I ====
- Avro Avian
- Avro Baby
- de Havilland DH.60 Moth
- Short Mussel
- Westland Widgeon

==== Cirrus II ====
- Avro Avian
- de Havilland DH.60 Moth
- de Havilland DH.71 Tiger Moth
- Piaggio P.9
- Short Mussel
- Westland Widgeon
- Bloudek XV Lojze

==== Cirrus III ====
- Avro Avian
- Blackburn Bluebird
- Cierva C.17
- de Havilland DH.60 Moth
- de Havilland DH.71 Tiger Moth
- Dudley Watt D.W.2
- Koolhoven FK.41
- Klemm L.26
- Klemm L.27
- Short Mussel
- Simmonds Spartan
- Spartan Arrow
- Westland Wessex
- Westland Widgeon

==== Cirrus IIIA ====
- Miles M.2 Hawk

=== American Cirrus Engines ===
==== Cirrus III ====
- Great Lakes 2T-1A
- Emsco B-4 Cirrus
- Fairchild 24

==== Cirrus Hi-Drive ====
- Fairchild 22 C7A, C7AM and C7AS
- Fairchild 24 C8
- Granville Gee Bee Sportster Models X and B
- Great Lakes 2T-1 and -1E
- Skylark Aircraft 3-95

=== Hermes ===
==== Hermes I ====
- Avro Avian
- Blackburn Bluebird
- de Havilland DH.60 Moth
- Desoutter I
- Koolhoven FK.41
- Koolhoven FK.42
- Hawker Tomtit
- Hendy 302
- Parnall Elf
- Saro Cutty Sark
- Simmonds Spartan
- Southern Martlet
- Westland Wessex
- Westland Widgeon

==== Hermes II ====
- Avro Avian
- Blackburn Bluebird
- Desoutter I
- Spartan Arrow
- Spartan Three-Seater
- Westland Widgeon

==== Hermes IIB ====
- Arrow Active
- BFW M.23
- Klemm L.27
- Koolhoven F.K.44
- Koolhoven F.K.45
- Spartan Three-Seater

==== Hermes IV ====
- Avro 643 Cadet
- Hendy 302
- Miles M.2 Hawk
- Percival Gull
- Roe IV Triplane replica
- Spartan Cruiser
- Spartan Three-Seater

==== Hermes IVA ====
- Avro Club Cadet
- Blackburn B-2
- Blackburn Segrave

== Engines on display ==
- A preserved ADC Cirrus II is on display at the Science Museum (London).
- A Cirrus Hermes is on display at the EAA AirVenture Museum in Oshkosh, Wisconsin.

== See also ==
- ADC Airdisco: Previous, 8-cylinder adaptation by Halford for ADC.
- List of aircraft engines
- de Havilland Gipsy: Halford's subsequent new design.
- Hirth HM 60: German contemporary.
