= De Havilland Gipsy =

1920s British piston aircraft engine

Gipsy
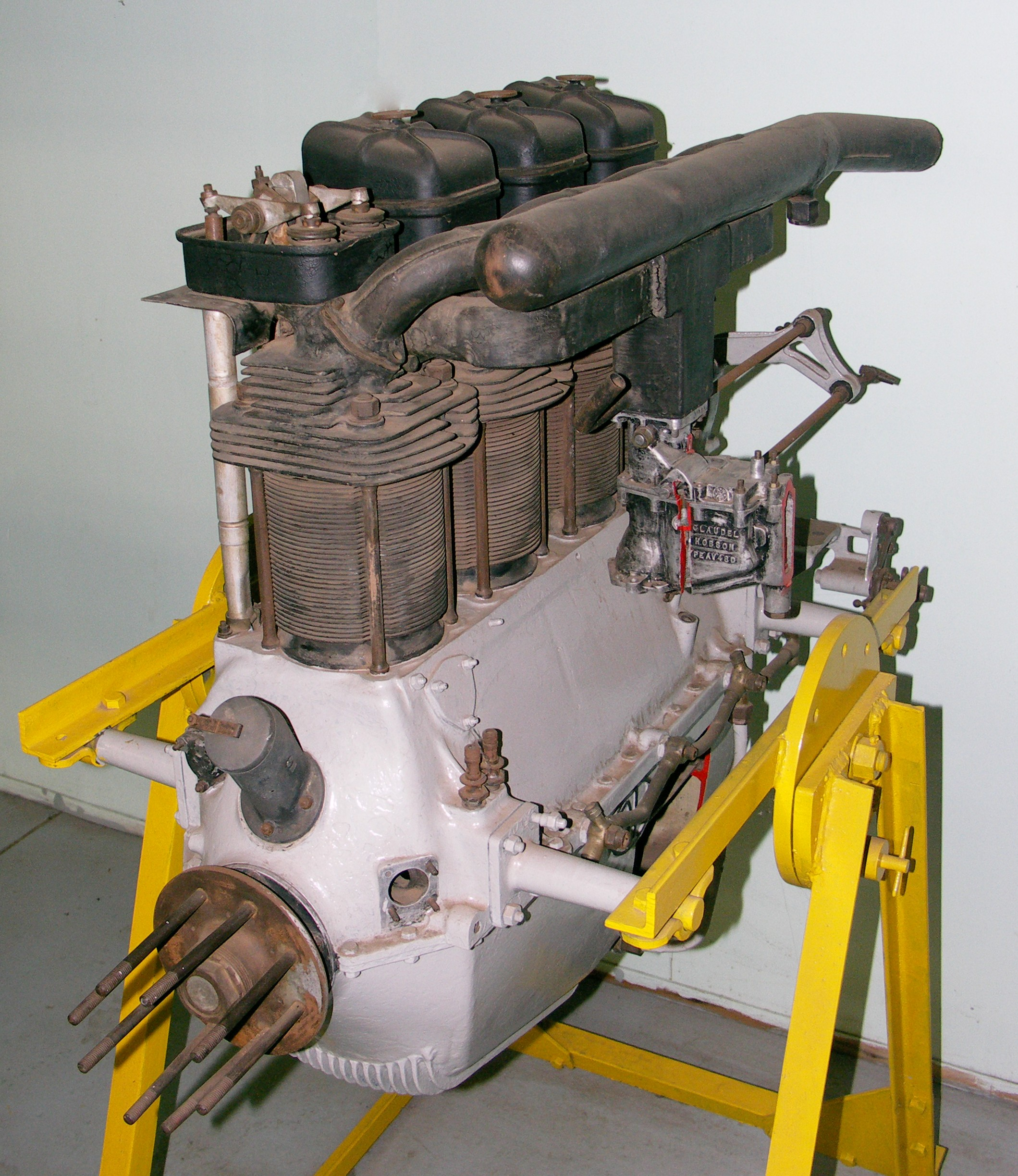
- Gipsy II
- Type: Four-cylinder inline piston engine
- National origin: United Kingdom
- Manufacturer: de Havilland
- First run: 1927
- Major applications: de Havilland D.H.60G Gipsy Moth de Havilland D.H.71 Tiger Moth racer
- Developed into: de Havilland Gipsy Major de Havilland Gipsy Minor

The de Havilland Gipsy is a British air-cooled four-cylinder in-line aircraft engine designed by Frank Halford in 1927 to replace the ADC Cirrus in the de Havilland DH.60 Moth light biplane. Initially developed as an upright 5 litre (300 cubic inch) capacity engine, later versions were designed to run inverted with increased capacity and power.

The Gipsy went on to become one of the most popular sport aircraft engines of the inter-war period and was the engine of choice for various other light aircraft, trainers, liaison aircraft and air taxis, British as well as foreign, until long past World War II. Apart from helping to establish the de Havilland Aircraft Company as a manufacturer of light aircraft, it also established the company as an engine manufacturer in its own right.

Gipsy engines remain in service powering vintage light aircraft.

== Design and development ==
Like the ADC Cirrus, the Gipsy was born as a collaboration between aircraft manufacturer Geoffrey de Havilland and engine designer Frank Halford. The origins and early history of both the Cirrus and Gipsy series of engines were linked through de Havilland's D.H.60 Moth.

=== Cirrus origins ===
In 1925 Geoffrey de Havilland was looking for a reliable cheap engine for use in a light sports aircraft. More particularly, he was looking for something like his favourite First World War aircraft engine: the 240 hp (180 kW) Renault 8G air-cooled V8, but with half the weight and half the power. Halford gave it to him by building a four-cylinder crankcase and adding to it half of the Renault's cylinders, several other of the Renault's components, and standard parts used in car engines. The result was a 60 hp (45 kW) in-line aircraft engine that, although it fell short of the promised horse-power, was still superior to all contemporary engines for light aircraft. Most importantly it was a true aircraft engine at a time when its competitors were more often than not motorcycle engines adapted to running at high altitude. The engine secured, de Havilland Aircraft commenced manufacture of the D.H.60 Moth and the combination of reliable powerplant – the ADC Cirrus – and reliable training craft – the Moth – marked the start of serious sports flying in Britain.

By 1927 however, the Moth threatened to become a victim of its own success as continuing demand was depleting the stockpiles of surplus Renaults needed to build its Cirrus engine. The Moth now having provided a solid financial cushion, de Havilland Aircraft decided to take the problem head-on and start its own engine factory. Geoffrey de Havilland again went to his old friend Halford and this time asked him to design a completely new aircraft engine of weight and performance comparable to the latest version of the Cirrus. At much the same time Cirrus Aero Engines was formed to continue manufacture of the Cirrus engines, from scratch.

=== DH.71 Tiger Moth racer ===
Halford and de Havilland quickly agreed on a 135 hp (101 kW) test engine later to be de-rated to 100 hp (75 kW) for production models. While Halford went to build the engine, de Havilland designed its test-bed: the diminutive D.H.71 racer. Two D.H.71s were built and named Tiger Moth, but their racing career was rather uneventful. Their only notability came in capturing a world speed record of 186 mph (299 km/h) for their weight class. (The name Tiger Moth would later be used again for the D.H.82 trainer and with this aircraft gain more fame.) What the D.H.71 did not accomplish in racing successes, it did accomplish in developing the new engine and by the time the career of the D.H.71 was over, the 100 hp (75 kW) production version of its engine, now named the Gipsy, was ready to start its career.

=== Technical description ===
Like the Cirrus, the new Gipsy was an air-cooled four-cylinder in-line engine weighing a mere 300 pounds and rated at 98 hp (73 kW) at 2,100 rpm. The cylinders had a bore of 4.5 in (110 mm) and a stroke of 5 in (130 mm) for a displacement of 319 cu in (5.23 L). It was soon developed further into the 120 hp (89 kW) Gipsy II; both types were to be used in the D.H.60G Gipsy Moth. The new engine proved itself to be docile, easy to maintain and, as demonstrated in many long distance flights by the new Gipsy Moth, reliable.

=== Birth of the Gipsy Major ===
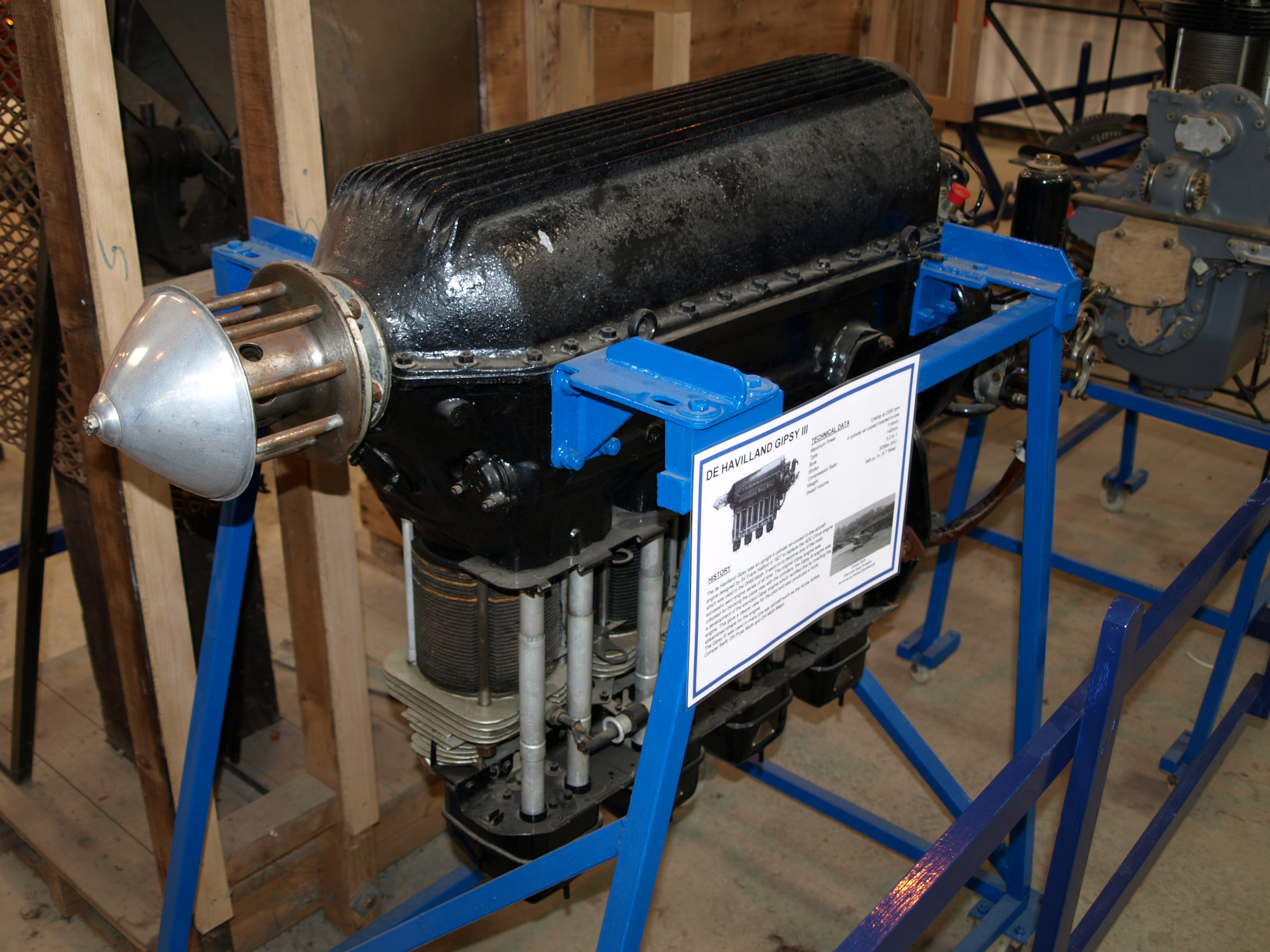
de Havilland Gipsy III preserved at the Shuttleworth Collection

For all of this the new engine still had one drawback: its cylinders were still built on top of the crankshaft and therefore were sticking out of the top of the fuselage, right in the pilot's field of vision. Lowering the engine was impossible as the crankshaft was directly connected to the propeller and the propeller could not be placed too low lest it would plough into the ground on hard landings or bumpy fields. The solution came as several pilots boasted that they would be able to fly their Moth upside down for as long as they wanted if it were not for the carburettor and fuel tank now being inverted. Halford decided to test this by mounting a Gipsy engine upside down and then inverting its carburettor so it was now right side up again. The design proved to run just as flawlessly as the regular Gipsy engine and soon the Gipsy I and II were replaced on the production lines by the Gipsy III inverted four-cylinder engine. The Moth with this new engine became the D.H.60 G-III; as the Gipsy III was quickly developed further into the Gipsy Major, the D.H.60 G-III was baptised the Moth Major.

Building on the success of the D.H.60, de Havilland now started building other sports aircraft and trainers, all of which were powered by its own Gipsy engines. The company now produced Gipsy engines for other manufacturers as well and the Gipsy Major in particular became the engine of choice for scores of light aircraft designs, British as well as foreign. Most notably it was the engine of the famous World War II D.H.82A Tiger Moth trainer.

== Variants ==
Gipsy I
Original production version. 1,445 built.

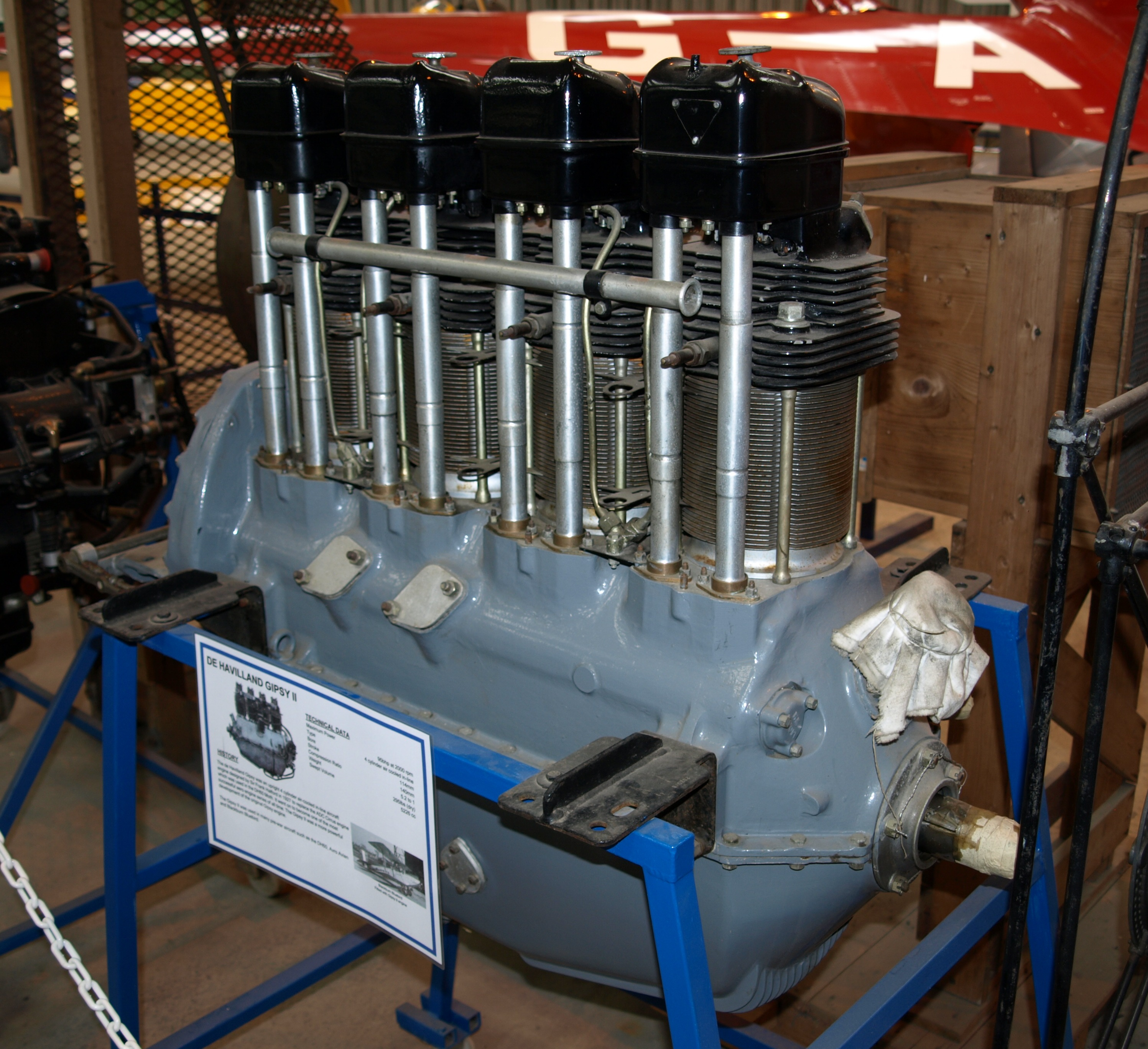
Gipsy II on display at the Shuttleworth Collection

Gipsy II
Stroke increased to 5.5 in (140 mm). Power 120 hp (90 kW) at 2,300 rpm. 309 built
Gipsy III
As Gipsy II, inverted. 611 built.
Gipsy IV
A smaller inverted four-cylinder in-line engine, derived from the Gipsy III, intended for light sporting aircraft. Forerunner of Gipsy Minor. Power 82 hp (61 kW).
Gipsy Major
Further development of the Gipsy III. Originally 130 hp (92 kW) later 141 and 145 hp (105, 110 kW)
Gipsy Minor
Further development of the Gipsy IV. Power 90 hp (67 kW).
Gipsy R
Racing engine for de Havilland DH.71 Tiger Moth. 135 hp (100 kW) at 2,850 rpm.
Wright-Gipsy L-320
Licence production in the United States of the Gipsy I

== Applications ==
Application list from Lumsden. Gipsy Minor and Major not included.

=== Gipsy I ===
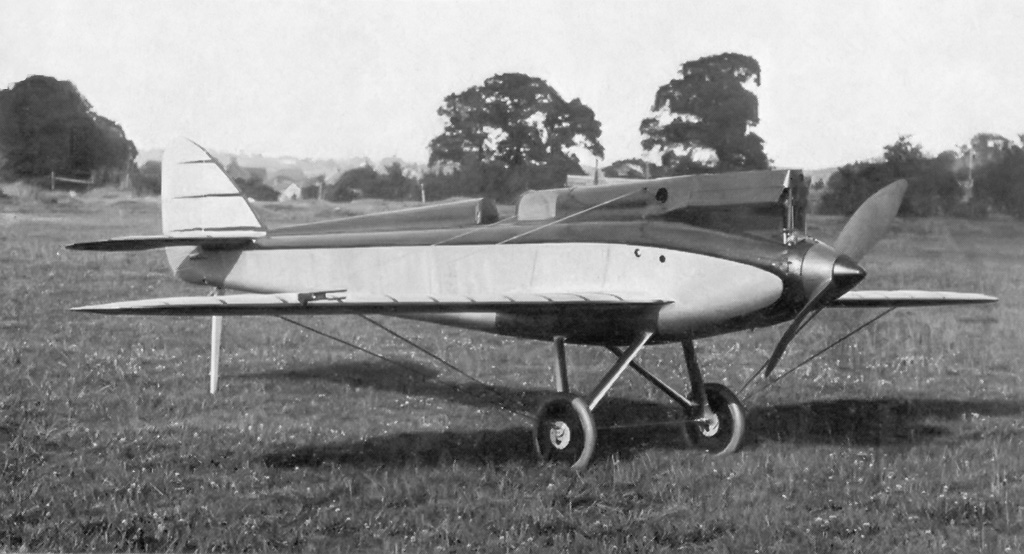
The DH.71 Tiger Moth racer

- Avro Avian
- Bartel BM-4
- Blackburn Bluebird IV
- Breda Ba.15
- de Havilland DH.60G Gipsy Moth
- de Havilland DH.60T Gipsy Moth Trainer
- de Havilland D.H.71 Tiger Moth racer
- PZL.5
- Simmonds Spartan
- Southern Martlet
- Spartan Arrow
- Westland Widgeon

=== Gipsy II ===
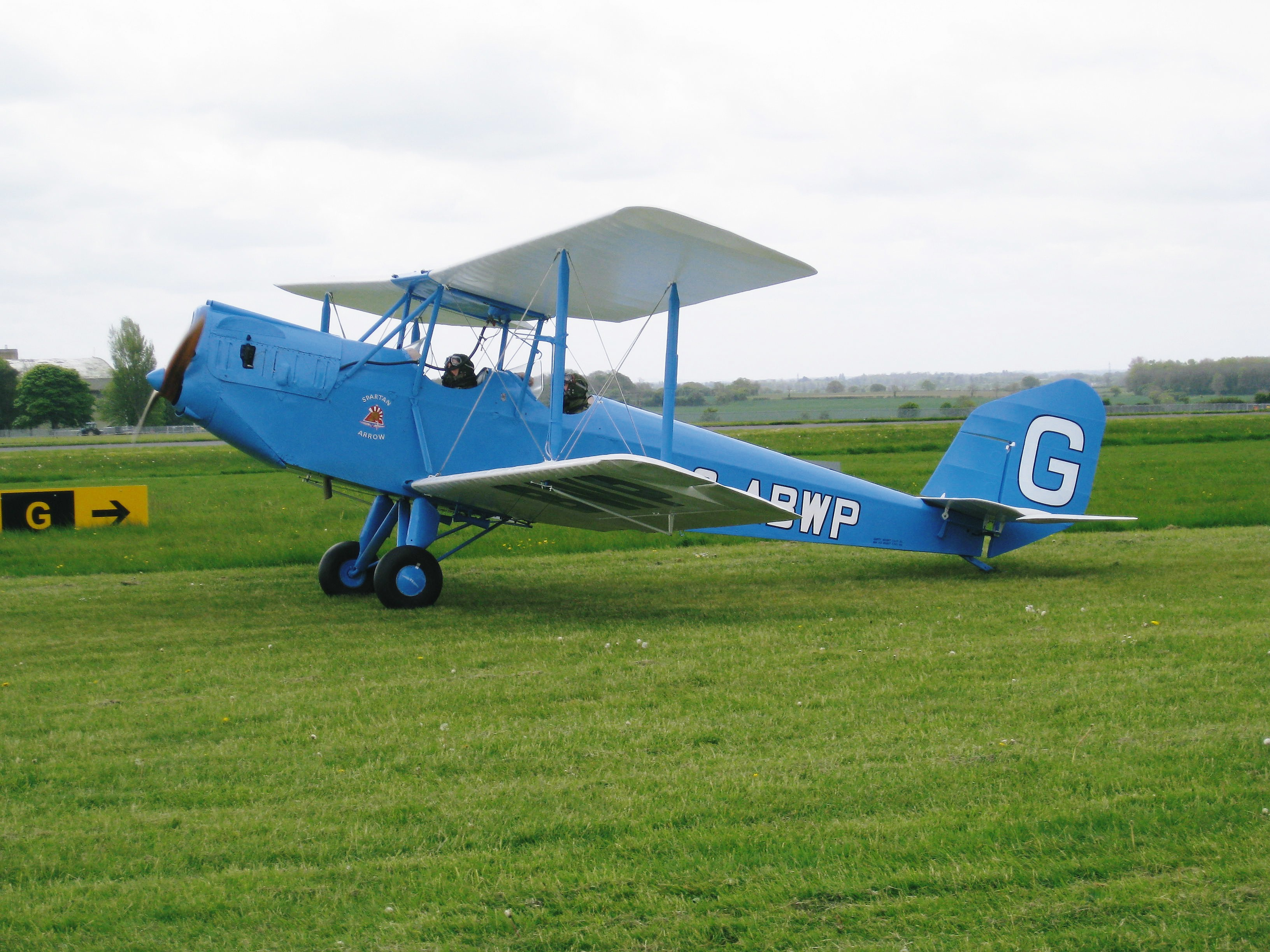
The Gipsy-powered Spartan Arrow

- Airspeed Ferry
- Avro Avian
- Blackburn Bluebird IV
- de Havilland DH.60G Gipsy Moth
- de Havilland DH.60T Gipsy Moth Trainer
- PZL.5
- RWD-4
- Saro Cutty Sark
- Saro Windhover
- Short Mussel
- Simmonds Spartan
- Southern Martlet
- Spartan Arrow
- Spartan Three Seater

=== Gipsy III ===
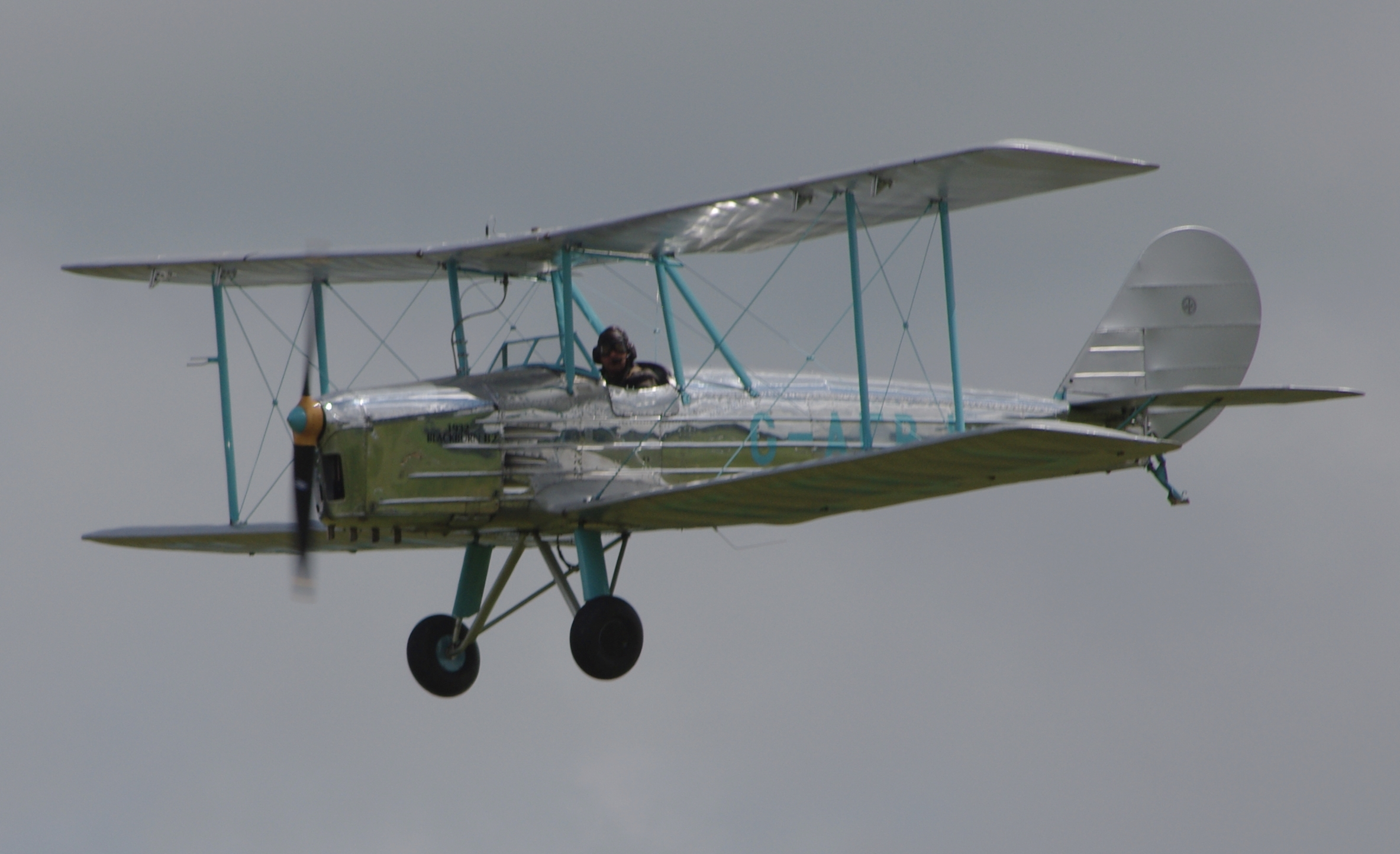
Preserved Blackburn B-2

- Airspeed Ferry
- Arrow Active
- Avro Avian
- Bartel BM-4
- Blackburn Bluebird IV
- Blackburn B-2
- Blackburn-Saro Meteor
- Bloch MB.90
- Breda Ba.33
- Cierva C.24
- Comper Swift
- Darmstadt D-22
- de Havilland Fox Moth
- de Havilland DH.60G Gipsy Moth
- de Havilland Hornet Moth
- de Havilland DH.60GIII Moth Major
- de Havilland Leopard Moth
- de Havilland Puss Moth
- de Havilland DH.82A Tiger Moth I
- de Havilland T.K.1
- Desoutter Mk.II
- Heinkel He 64C
- Klemm Kl 26
- Klemm Kl 27
- Klemm Kl 32
- Miles Hawk
- Miles Hawk Major
- Pander P-3
- PZL.19
- Saro Cutty Sark
- Saro-Percival Mailplane
- Spartan Cruiser
- Westland-Hill Pterodactyl

=== Gipsy IV ===
- de Havilland Swallow Moth

=== Gipsy R ===
- de Havilland DH.71 Tiger Moth racer

== Surviving engines ==
As of October 2010 approximately 17 Gipsy-powered de Havilland DH.60 Moths remain on the British register. Not all are currently airworthy.

== Engines on display ==
Preserved de Havilland Gipsy engines are on public display at the:

- de Havilland Aircraft Museum
- Royal Air Force Museum Cosford
- Shuttleworth Collection
- Trenchard Museum RAF Halton, Halton, Buckinghamshire
- Old Rhinebeck Aerodrome

== Specifications (Gipsy I) ==
Data from Bransom and Lumsden.

=== General characteristics ===
- Type: 4-cylinder air-cooled inline piston aircraft engine
- Bore: 4.5 in (114.3 mm)
- Stroke: 5 in (127 mm)
- Displacement: 318.1 cu in (5.21 L)
- Length: 40.5 in (1028.5 mm)
- Width: 20 in (508 mm)
- Height: 29.9 in (759.5 mm)
- Dry weight: 285 lb (129.3 kg)

=== Components ===
- Valvetrain: Overhead valve
- Fuel system: Zenith carburettor with altitude control
- Fuel type: Petrol (Aviation grade fuel not required)
- Cooling system: Air-cooled

=== Performance ===
- Power output: 85 hp at 1,900 rpm (sea level)
- Compression ratio: 5:1
- Power-to-weight ratio: 0.3 hp/lb

== See also ==
- de Havilland Aircraft Heritage Centre

Related development

- de Havilland Gipsy Major
- de Havilland Gipsy Six

Comparable engines

- ADC Cirrus
- Alfa Romeo 110
- Hirth HM 504
- Menasco C4

Related lists

- List of aircraft engines
