= Spartan Air Lines =

Airline of the United Kingdom (1933–1935)

Spartan Air Lines Ltd
- Founded: 2 February 1933
- Commenced operations: 12 April 1933
- Ceased operations: 30 September 1935 (merged with United Airways Limited and Hillman's Airways to form British Airways Ltd)
- Hubs: Heston Aerodrome
- Parent company: Spartan Aircraft

Spartan Air Lines Ltd was a British private airline company active between 1933 and 1935. In 1933 it started operating passenger services from the London area to the Isle of Wight. In late 1935 it merged with United Airways Ltd to form British Airways Ltd.

== History ==
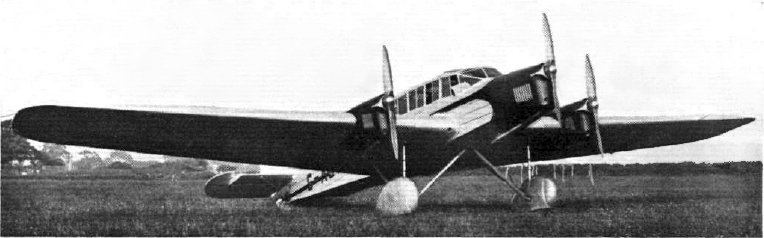
Spartan Cruiser I

Spartan Air Lines Ltd was formed on 2 February 1933, as a subsidiary of Spartan Aircraft Ltd, to develop the use of its product the Spartan Cruiser. The company was financed by Whitehall Securities Ltd, and services to the Isle of Wight were to be operated in co-operation with private railway companies. The managing director was W.D.L. Roberts, with Harold Balfour and Alliott Verdon-Roe as fellow directors, and Mr P.W. Lynch-Blosse as chief pilot.

On 12 April 1933 the first service was started from Heston Aerodrome to Somerton (Cowes West) Aerodrome, Cowes, Isle of Wight, using three Spartan Cruisers.

After a winter break in scheduled operations, the airline moved to Croydon Aerodrome for the summer 1934 season, in collaboration with Railway Air Services.

In April 1935 Spartan Air Lines returned to Heston operating services to both Cowes and Bembridge, again in collaboration with Railway Air Services. A sister company in the Spartan group, United Airways Ltd, had been formed in 1934 to operate connecting services from Heston to Hall Caine Airport, Isle of Man via Stanley Park Aerodrome (Blackpool) for the 1935 season.

On 30 September 1935 Spartan Air Lines and United Airways Limited merged to form Allied British Airways Ltd, which on 29 October 1935 was renamed British Airways Ltd. The new airline started operations on 1 January 1936, initially based at Heston.

== Fleet ==
From Jackson (1974), Doyle (2002)

Aircraft type	Registration	Name	Remarks
Spartan Three Seater	G-ABTR		1933–1935
Spartan Cruiser I	G-ABTY		1933–1934
Spartan Cruiser II	G-ACBM		1934–1935
Spartan Cruiser II	G-ACDW	Faithful City	1934
Spartan Cruiser II	G-ACDX	Hampshire	1933–1935
Spartan Cruiser II	G-ACSM	Sussex	1934–1935
Spartan Cruiser II	G-ACVT	Middlesex	1934–1935
Spartan Cruiser II	G-ACZM		1934–1935
Spartan Cruiser III	G-ACYK		1935
Spartan Cruiser III	G-ACYL		1934–1935
Spartan Cruiser III	G-ADEL		1935
Spartan Cruiser III	G-ADEM		1935
Saro A.19 Cloud	G-ABXW	Cloud of Iona	1935
DH.84 Dragon	G-ACNG		1935
DH.84 Dragon	G-ACNI		1935
