= Koolhoven F.K.45 =

F.K.45
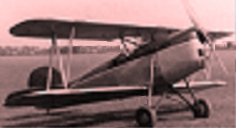
- F.K.45 Aerobatic

General information
- Type: Aerobatic aircraft
- National origin: Netherlands
- Manufacturer: N.V. Koolhoven Vliegtuigen
- Number built: 1

History
- First flight: February 1932

The Koolhoven F.K.45 was an aerobatic biplane built to the requirements of one pilot who flew it at airshows in the mid-1930s. Only one was built.

== Design and development ==
The F.K.45 was the result of a 1931 order from René Paulhan, a French test pilot with Nieuport-Delage, for a light aerobatic aircraft. It was first flown in February 1932, though not delivered to Paulhan for two more years. It was a single bay biplane, with equal span, unswept wings of constant chord and strong stagger, braced with N-form struts and flying wires. Ailerons were mounted on both upper and lower wings. The upper wing of the F.K.45 was held above the fuselage by a pair of short, outward leaning N-form cabane struts to the upper fuselage longerons. The single seat cockpit, set in an opening in the otherwise continuous, rounded fuselage decking, was under the wing trailing edge where a rectangular cut-out enhanced visibility. Its tailplane was mounted on top of the fuselage; the fin was quadrant shaped and the straight edged rudder extended down to the keel.

The F.k.45 was powered by a 115 hp (86 kW) Cirrus-Hermes IIB four cylinder inverted air-cooled inline, which drove a two blade propeller. Its undercarriage was of the fixed, conventional type, with the mainwheels on axles forming an inverted V and attached to the central fuselage underside. The main legs, with shock absorbers, were mounted on the upper longerons. There was a small tailwheel.

== Operational history ==
The sole F.K.45 initially flew with the test registration Z1, then with the Dutch registration PH-AIF, but when it was handed over to Paulan on 24 April 1934 it was placed on the French register as F-AMXT. Paulhan displayed it at airshows over the next two years and then sold it. In August 1938, the F.K.45 had logged only fifty hours of flight. It went on to two more owners but its final fate is unknown.

== Specifications ==
Data from Wesselink

General characteristics

- Crew: One
- Length: 5.57 m (18 ft 3 in)
- Wingspan: 7.04 m (23 ft 1 in)
- Gross weight: 580 kg (1,279 lb)
- Powerplant: 1 × Cirrus-Hermes IIB 4-cylinder inverted air-cooled inline, 86 kW (115 hp)
- Propellers: 2-bladed

Performance

- Maximum speed: 210 km/h (130 mph, 110 kn) at sea level
