= Koolhoven F.K.44 =

Two-seat, single engine sport monoplane

F.K.44

General information
- Type: Two seat sport and touring aircraft
- National origin: Netherlands
- Manufacturer: N.V. Koolhoven Vliegtuigen
- Number built: 1

History
- First flight: c.1931

The Koolhoven F.K.44 was a two-seat, single engine sport monoplane designed and built in the Netherlands in the early 1930s. It was built to order, but only one was completed.

== Design and development ==
The F.K.44 was a two-seat sports aircraft with a parasol wing of constant chord and rounded tips, braced on each side by a pair of struts which diverged from the wing spars to the lower fuselage longerons. It was powered by a 115 hp (87 kW) four-cylinder inverted inline Cirrus-Major engine driving a two blade propeller. The fuselage was flat sided. The seats were placed under the wing, surrounded with cabane struts, with a large rectangular cut-out for enhanced visibility in the trailing edge. Behind them the upper decking sloped away; further aft still the fuselage tapered to the tail. The vertical tail was straight tapered and square tipped, the horizontal tail set just above the top of the fuselage and braced to it and the elevators separate with a cut-out to allow rudder movement. The F.K.44's fixed, conventional undercarriage had mainwheels mounted on long, shallow V-struts attached to the lower fuselage longerons and with substantial tall, vertical legs to the forward wing spar, meeting the wing strut.

== Operational history ==
The F.K.44 was not intended for production, rather to be built by order. The first such was started but not completed and so the second example was the first and indeed the only one flown. This had been flying for a while on a temporary registration before going on the civil list as PH-AJM' on 28 August 1931. It was owned by Jacob Mees, a banker who punningly christened his Koolhoven the "Koolmees" or "Great Tit" in English. The following year Mees gave the Rotterdam Aero Club the use of his aircraft, but it was destroyed in June 1933, during an emergency landing at Castricum following an engine failure.

== Specifications ==
Data from Wesselink.

General characteristics

- Capacity: Two
- Length: 7.85 m (25 ft 9 in)
- Wingspan: 11.00 m (36 ft 1 in)
- Gross weight: 800 kg (1,764 lb)
- Powerplant: 1 × Cirrus-Hermes IIB 4-cylinder inverted air-cooled inline, 86 kW (115 hp)
- Propellers: 2-bladed

Performance

- Maximum speed: 190 km/h (120 mph, 100 kn) at 1,000 m (3,280 ft)
