= Simmonds Spartan =

Spartan
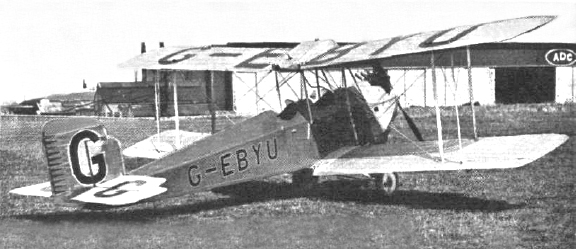

General information
- Type: Trainer/tourer aircraft
- Manufacturer: Simmonds Aircraft Limited
- Designer: Oliver E. Simmonds
- Primary user: National Flying Services Ltd
- Number built: 49

History
- Introduction date: 1928
- First flight: 1928

The Simmonds Spartan is a 1920s British two-seat biplane trainer/tourer aircraft built by Simmonds Aircraft Limited.

== History ==
Not happy with the high cost of manufacturing light aircraft, O.E. Simmonds designed and built a wooden two-seat biplane in 1928. To reduce maintenance costs all four wings and ailerons were identical; this allowed one spare wing to be used in any position. This meant that the wing had a symmetrical aerofoil - an unusual arrangement. Additionally the tail control surfaces were interchangeable as well as the wheels and the bracing wires. Powered by a Cirrus III, the prototype G-EBYU first flew in time to enter the King's Cup Air Race of 1928. The aircraft was flown to the Berlin Aero Show on 24 October 1928, a non-stop flight of 7 hours and 10 minutes.

Production began at Woolston, Hampshire, with the final assembly and test flying at Hamble Aerodrome. Forty-nine aircraft were built, many for export, with New Zealand customers buying the most. At home 12 were delivered to the National Flying Services for use as trainers. Three aircraft were operated on floats in Fiji. Although not as famous as other aircraft of the period, one aircraft was ski-equipped and was notable for covering more than 45,000 miles over Norwegian mountain ranges. Three aircraft were built as three-seaters, with two passengers in tandem in front of the pilot; these were mainly used for pleasure flying.

Due to the success of the Spartan, the company renamed itself Spartan Aircraft Limited and developed the design into the two-seater Spartan Arrow and the three-seater Spartan Three Seater.

== Survivors ==
New Zealand Simmonds Spartan ZK-ABZ is situated at the Geraldine Tractor and Automobile Museum. It was flown by Geraldine-based New Zealand Airways Limited, amongst others. NZ Simmonds Spartan ZK-ABK was rebuilt and obtained a COA (Certificate of Airworthiness) in 2008. It was believed to be still flying in 2023.

== Operators ==
The aircraft was operated by flying clubs and private individuals:

Australia

Canada

Fiji

- Fiji Airways

India
New Zealand

- New Zealand Airways

Norway
South Africa

- South African Air Force

Sweden
United Kingdom

- National Flying Services

== Specifications ==
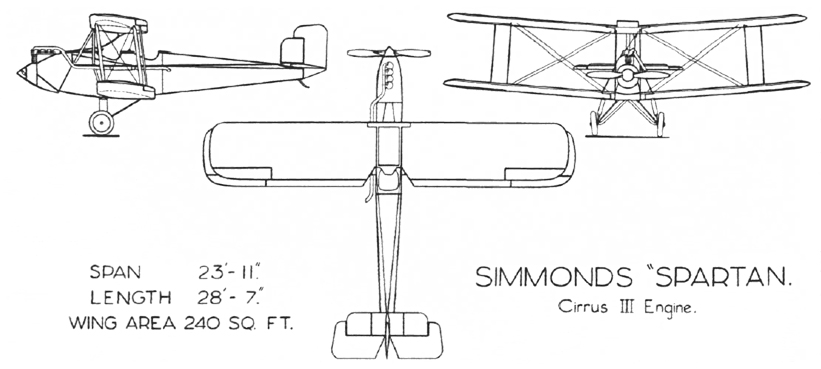
Simmonds Spartan drawing

Data from British Civil Aircraft 1919–1972: Volume III

General characteristics

- Length: 23 ft 11 in (7.29 m)
- Wingspan: 28 ft 7 in (8.71 m)
- Height: 9 ft 3 in (2.82 m)
- Wing area: 240 sq ft (22.3 m^{2})
- Empty weight: 940 lb (427 kg)
- Max takeoff weight: 1,680 lb (764 kg)
- Powerplant: 1 × Cirrus Hermes I inline piston, 100 hp (75 kW)

Performance

- Maximum speed: 100 mph (161 km/h, 87 kn)
- Range: 320 mi (515 km, 278 nmi)
- Rate of climb: 600 ft/min (3.0 m/s)

== See also ==
Related development

- Spartan Arrow - Spartan Three Seater

Aircraft of comparable role, configuration, and era

- de Havilland Gipsy Moth - Avro Avian - PZL.5 - CANT 26 - Caudron C.230
