= Spartan Aircraft =

British company

Spartan Aircraft Limited
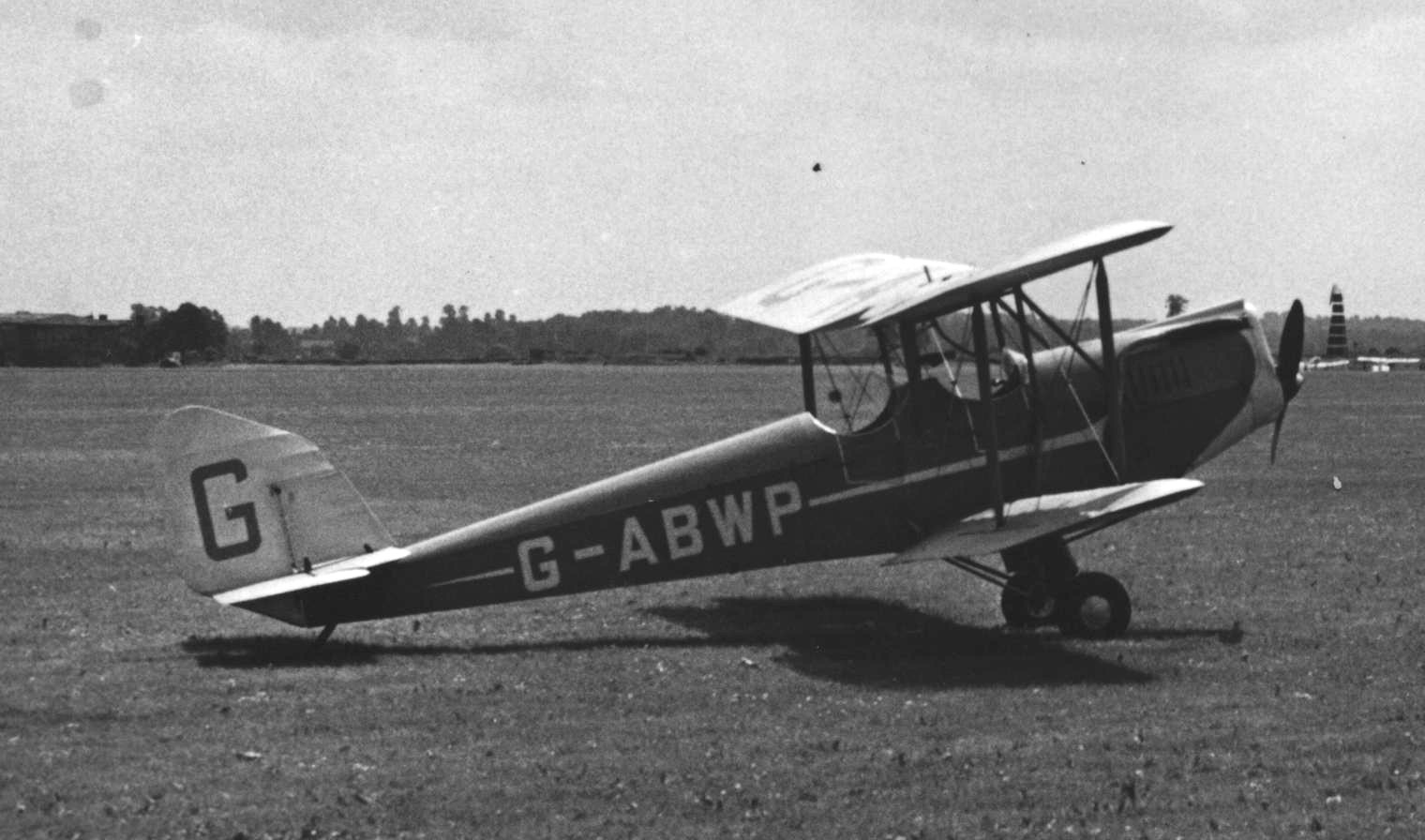
- The last surviving Spartan aircraft, an Arrow, still airworthy as of 2016
- Company type: Limited company
- Industry: Aircraft manufacturing
- Predecessor: Simmonds Aircraft
- Founded: Woolston, Hampshire, UK 1930
- Founder: Oliver Simmonds
- Fate: Merged with Saunders Roe, 1935
- Products: Civil aircraft

Spartan Aircraft Limited was a British aircraft manufacturer from 1930 to 1935. It was formed by reinvestment in Simmonds Aircraft which had suffered financially.

== History ==
In 1928 Oliver Simmonds designed and built a prototype aircraft, the Simmonds Spartan, in a factory at Woolston, Hampshire. The design was a success with over 50 aircraft built. Following financial difficulties and investment from Whitehall Securities Corporation Ltd Simmonds Aircraft Limited changed name in 1930 to Spartan Aircraft Limited.

The first aircraft from the renamed company was the Spartan Arrow a two-seat biplane of which 15 were built. The next design was a three-seat open-cockpit biplane the Spartan Three Seater. The company ceased to build aircraft in 1935.

In January 1931 Flight magazine revealed that Whitehall Securities had acquired a substantial holding in Saunders Roe Ltd. and arising out of this investment Spartan was effectively merged into Saunders Roe. Spartan Aircraft's final product was the Spartan Cruiser a three-engined light airliner developed from the Saro-Percival Mailplane.

== Aircraft ==
- Simmonds Spartan
- Spartan Arrow – first flight 1930, 15 built
- Spartan Three Seater – first flight 1931, 25 built
- Spartan Cruiser – passenger, first flight 1932 17 built
- Spartan Clipper – 1 built 1932

== See also ==
- Spartan Air Lines
