= ADC Cirrus =

1920s British piston aircraft engine

Cirrus
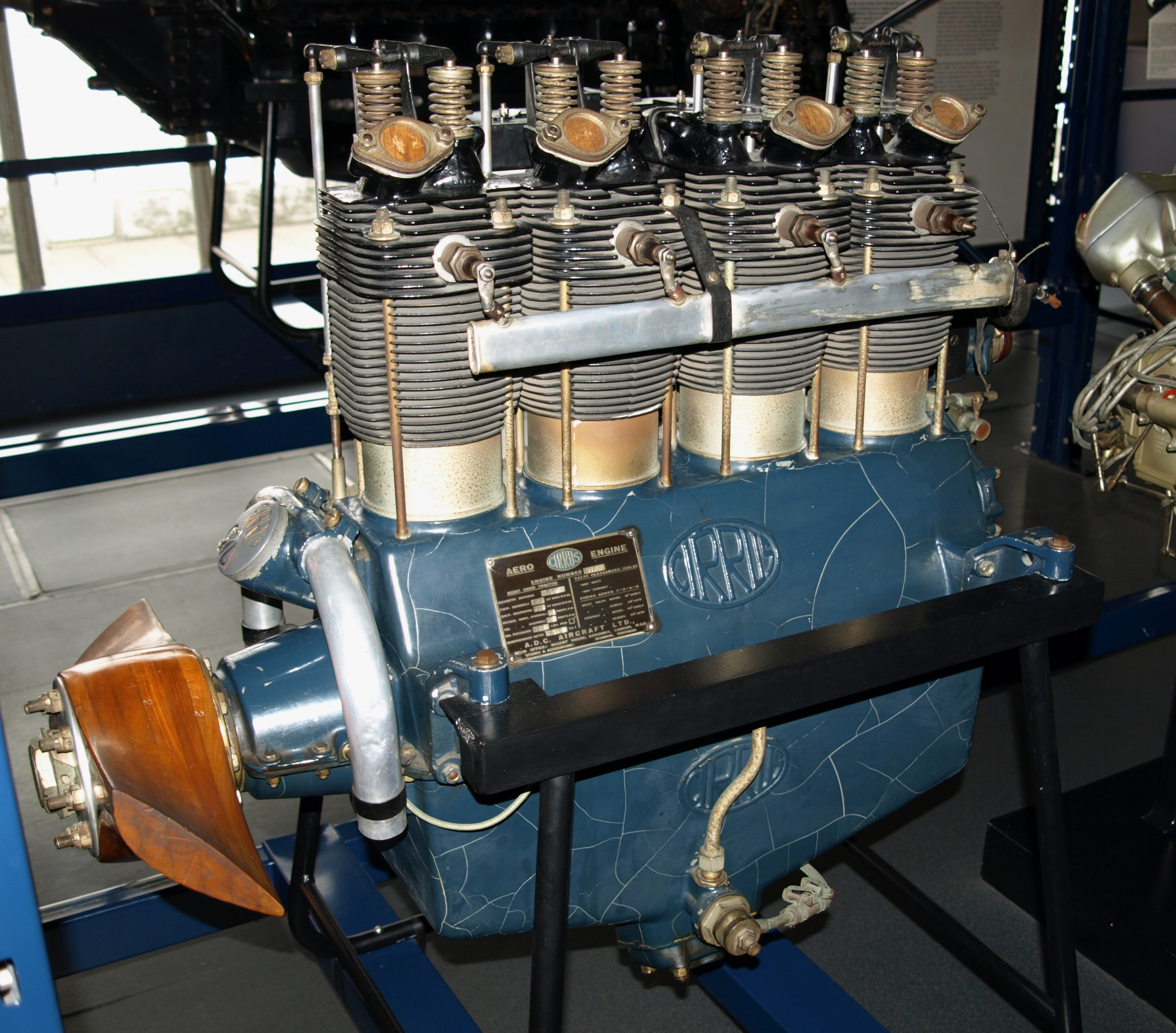
- ADC Cirrus II at the Science Museum, London
- Type: Air-cooled 4-cylinder inline piston engine
- National origin: United Kingdom
- Manufacturer: Aircraft Disposal Company (ADC)
- First run: 1925
- Major applications: de Havilland DH.60 Moth; Avro Avian

The ADC Cirrus is a series of British aero engines manufactured using surplus Renault parts by the Aircraft Disposal Company (ADC) in the 1920s.

The engines were air-cooled, four-cylinder inline types. They were widely used for private and light aircraft.

== Design and development ==
The Cirrus engine originated in Geoffrey de Havilland's 1924 search for a powerplant suitable for the light two-seat sports biplane which would become the de Havilland Moth. No engine existed at the time with a suitable level of power combined with a low weight. The Aircraft Disposal Company, also known as Airdisco and ADC, were producing the low-cost Airdisco V8 which had been developed by Frank Halford from their large stocks of war surplus Renault V8 aero engines. De Havilland realised that half of this engine would make an air-cooled four-cylinder inline engine of just the right size at low cost. He persuaded Halford to undertake its design and development.

The cylinders, pistons, con-rods and gearing were taken from the Renault, with the valve gear based on the Airdisco, and a new five-bearing crankshaft and cast crankcase were designed. It became the first Cirrus engine, and the first air-cooled four-cylinder inline aero engine to go into quantity production.

The original Cirrus engines were all designed by Halford and built by ADC. The 65 horsepower (48 kW) Cirrus I passed its 50-hour type rating in 1925. De Havilland launched his product as the Cirrus Moth and it proved a winning combination. The engine was soon adopted for other aircraft. Later versions named the Cirrus II, and Cirrus III were produced, each with slightly greater displacement and power (Cirrus II - 85 hp, Cirrus III - 90 hp).

ADC ceased manufacture when it ran out of surplus Renault engines around 1928.

=== Subsequent manufacture ===
When ADC ran out of parts, manufacture of the Cirrus III was taken up by Cirrus Aero Engines, also based at Croydon.

The Cirrus III was also adapted and improved by American Cirrus Engines, who manufactured it under license.

== Variants ==
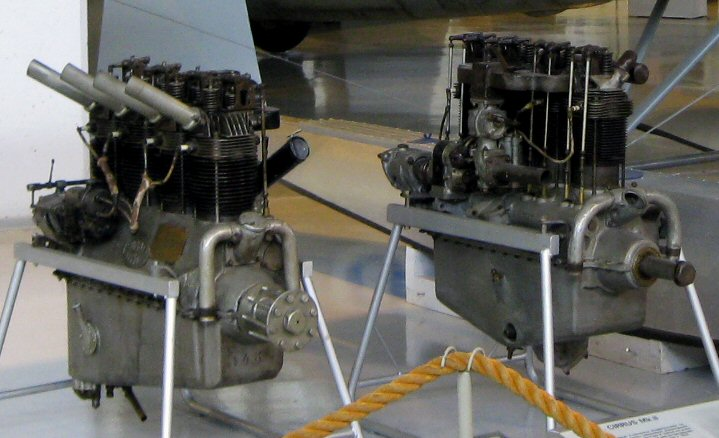
Cirrus III engine on the right

Cirrus I
(1925)
Cirrus II
(1926)
Cirrus III
(1929)

== Applications ==
List from Lumsden except where noted. The list includes trial installations where a different engine was principally adopted.

=== Cirrus ===
==== Cirrus I ====
- Avro Avian
- Avro Baby
- de Havilland DH.60 Moth
- Short Mussel
- Westland Widgeon

==== Cirrus II ====
- Avro Avian
- de Havilland DH.60 Moth
- de Havilland DH.71 Tiger Moth
- Piaggio P.9
- Short Mussel
- Westland Widgeon
- Bloudek XV Lojze

==== Cirrus III ====
- Avro Avian
- Blackburn Bluebird
- Cierva C.17
- de Havilland DH.60 Moth
- de Havilland DH.71 Tiger Moth
- Dudley Watt D.W.2
- Emsco B-4 Cirrus
- Koolhoven FK.41
- Klemm L.26
- Klemm L.27
- Short Mussel
- Simmonds Spartan
- Spartan Arrow
- Westland Wessex
- Westland Widgeon

== Engines on display ==
- A preserved ADC Cirrus II is on display at the Science Museum (London).

== Specifications (Cirrus I) ==
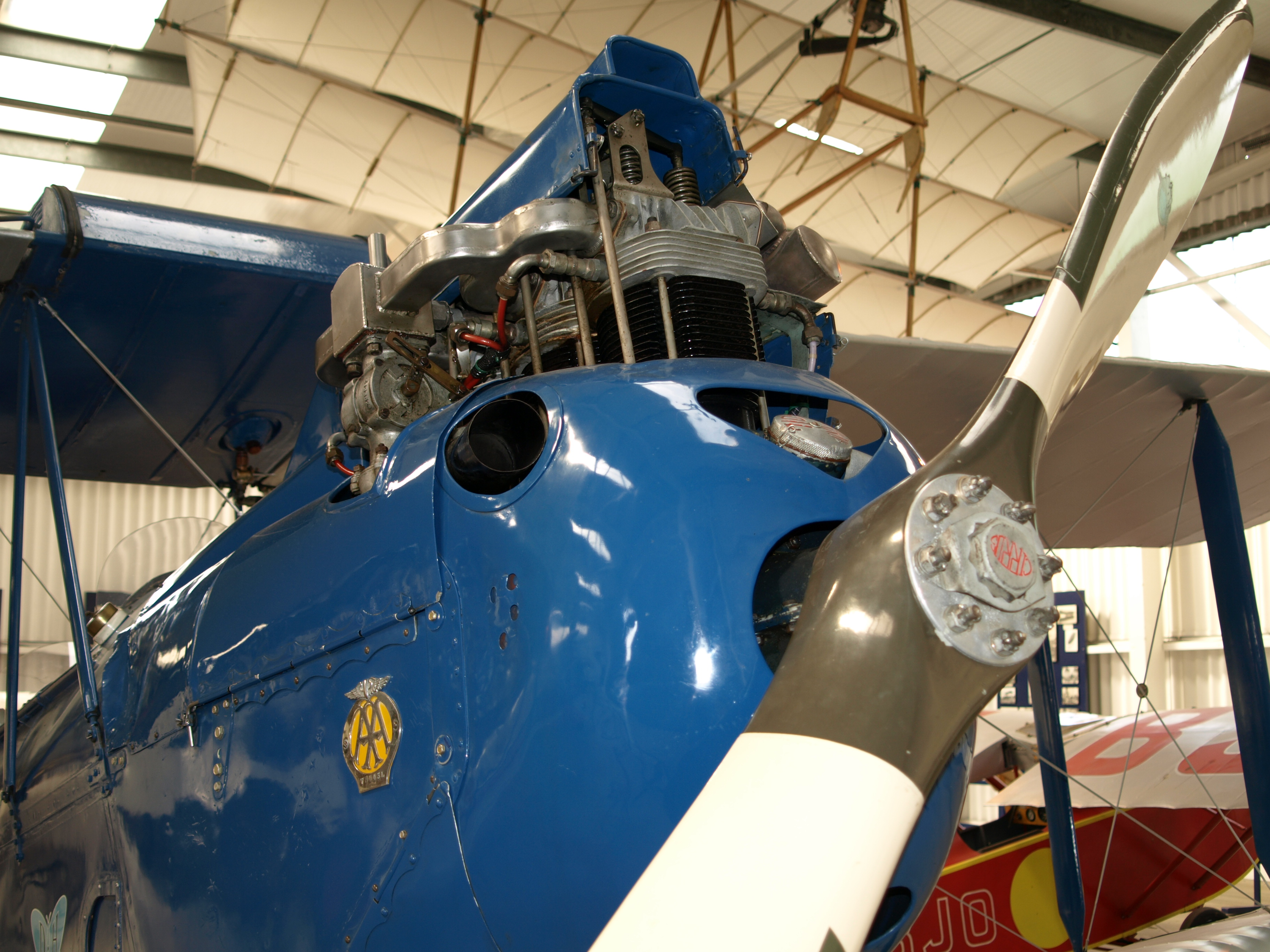
Cirrus III fitted to a de Havilland DH.60 Moth

Data from Lumsden.

=== General characteristics ===
- Type: Inline, air-cooled, upright 4-cylinder piston engine
- Bore: 4.13 in (105 mm)
- Stroke: 5.12 in (130 mm)
- Displacement: 274.36 cu in (4.5 L)
- Length: 45.8 in (116.3 cm)
- Width: 18.26 in (46.4 cm)
- Height: 34.3 in (87.1 cm)
- Dry weight: lb ( kg)

=== Components ===
- Valvetrain: 1 inlet and 1 exhaust valve per cylinder
- Fuel system: 1 Claudel carburettor
- Fuel type: 70 octane
- Cooling system: air

=== Performance ===
- Power output: 60 hp (45 kW)
- Compression ratio: 4.7:1

== See also ==
Comparable engines

- de Havilland Gipsy
- Hirth HM 60
- Walter Minor

Related lists

- List of aircraft engines
