= Piaggio P.9 =

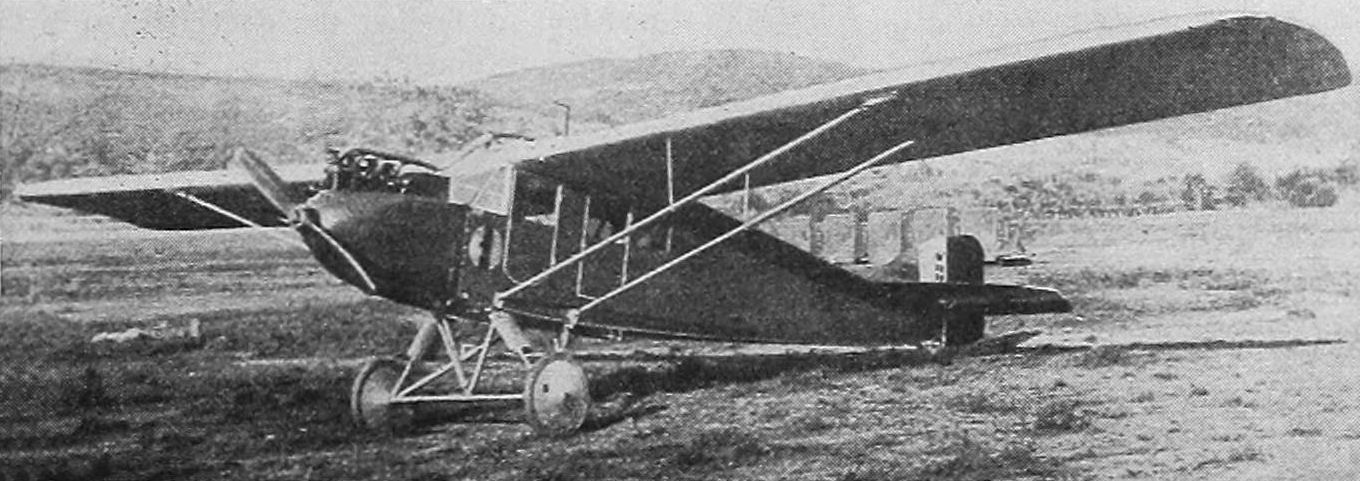

General information
- Type: Cabin Monoplane
- National origin: Italy
- Manufacturer: Piaggio

History
- Manufactured: 1
- First flight: 1929

The Piaggio P.9 was an Italian single-engined strut-braced high-wing cabin monoplane, designed and built by Piaggio as a tourer for the civil market. The wood-built two-seat P.9 was first flown in 1929, powered by a 75 hp (56 kW) Blackburn Cirrus II piston engine.

== Specifications ==
Data from Illustrated Encyclopedia of Aircraft

General characteristics

- Crew: two
- Wingspan: 12.85 m (42 ft 1.75 in)
- Gross weight: 720 kg (1,587 lb)
- Powerplant: 1 × Blackburn Cirrus II , 56 kW (75 hp)

Performance

- Maximum speed: 170 km/h (106 mph, 92 kn)
