= Dudley Watt D.W.2 =

Biplane

General information
- Type: Biplane
- National origin: United Kingdom
- Designer: K. N. Pearson
- Status: Dismantled
- Number built: 1

History
- First flight: 17 May 1930
- Retired: 1934

The Dudley Watt D.W.2 was a 1930s British two-seat light biplane designed by K.N. Pearson for Dudley Watt. The D.W.2 was built at Brooklands and was a wood and fabric biplane with a tailskid landing gear. It had two open cockpits and was powered by a 90 hp (67 kW) ADC Cirrus III piston engine.

The D.W.2 was designed to be offer exceptional handling at low speeds and to be a competitor for the de Havilland Moth family. Only one D.W.2 (registered G-AAWK) was built and this was sold by Dudley Watt in February 1934, it had been dismantled by the end of year.

== Specifications ==
Data from The Illustrated Encyclopedia of Aircraft

General characteristics

- Crew: 2
- Length: 25 ft 10 in (7.87 m)
- Wingspan: 39 ft 8 in (12.09 m)
- Wing area: 350 sq ft (32.5 m^{2})
- Empty weight: 1,050 lb (476 kg)
- Gross weight: 1,224 lb (555 kg)
- Powerplant: 1 × ADC Cirrus III inline piston engine , 67 hp (90 kW)

Performance

- Maximum speed: 90 mph (145 km/h, 78 kn)
