= Westland Widgeon (fixed wing) =

Type of aircraft

Widgeon
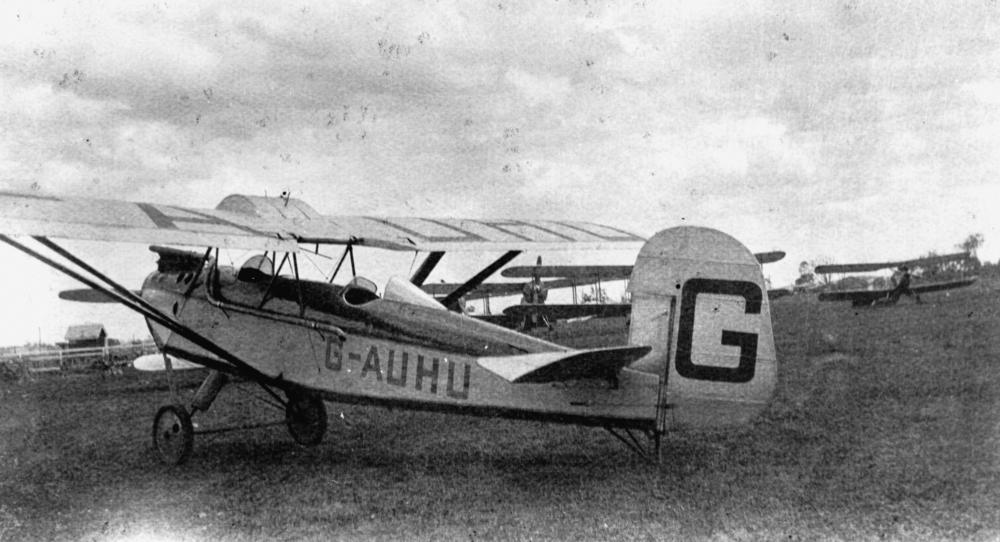
- Westland Widgeon III

General information
- Type: Light aircraft
- National origin: United Kingdom
- Manufacturer: Westland Aircraft
- Number built: 26

History
- First flight: 22 September 1924

The Westland Widgeon was a British light aircraft of the 1920s. A single-engined parasol monoplane, the Widgeon was built in small numbers before Westland abandoned production in 1929.

== Development and design ==
In 1924, the British Air Ministry, eager to encourage the development of cheap civil aircraft suitable for use by private owners and flying clubs, sponsored a competition for a two-seat ultralight aircraft, which had to be powered by an engine of 1100 cc displacement or less and capable of carrying a load of at least 340 lb (150 kg). To meet this requirement, Westland Aircraft produced two designs, the Woodpigeon biplane, and the Widgeon parasol monoplane. Unable to decide which design would be superior, Westland decided to build both types.

The Widgeon first flew at Westland's Yeovil factory on 22 September 1924, eight days after the first of two Woodpigeons. Its fuselage, which was similar to that of the Woodpigeon, was of mixed steel tube and wooden construction, while the wooden parasol wing, which was tapered in both chord and thickness, folded for easy storage. It was powered by a 1,090 cc Blackburne Thrush three cylinder radial engine, that produced 35 hp (26 kW).

The Air Ministry Light Aircraft competition began at Lympne Aerodrome, Kent on 27 September. The Widgeon, which due to the use of the Thrush engine was badly underpowered (as was the Woodpigeon), crashed during the first day of trials. Despite this setback, it was clear that the Widgeon had promise and was superior to the Woodpigeon, and the damaged prototype was rebuilt with a more powerful 60 hp (45 kW) Armstrong Siddeley Genet engine as the Widgeon II. Despite its much greater weight, the new engine transformed the Widgeon, the rebuilt aircraft being almost 40 mph (64 km/h) faster. The Widgeon took part in the 1926 Grosvenor Cup air race at Lympne on 18 September 1926. Its average speed of 105 mph (169 km/h) was the fastest recorded in the race, but owing to the handicapping system in place, the race was won by a Blackburn Bluebird. The sole Widgeon II was sold in January 1928 but was destroyed in a fatal crash on 10 October 1930.

Based on this experience, Westland decided to enter the Widgeon into production for the private owner. It was therefore redesigned with a simpler, constant chord, wing replacing the tapered wing of the Widgeon I and II, to ease production. The resulting Widgeon III could be powered either by a radial engine like the Genet or an inline engine such as the Cirrus. The first Widgeon III flew in March 1927, with production starting later that year. The design was further refined with a duralumin tube fuselage and a new undercarriage to produce the Widgeon IIIA.

The Widgeon proved expensive compared to its competitors and only 26 of all types were built, including the prototype, were built and sold before production was stopped in 1930 to allow Westland to concentrate on the Wapiti general-purpose military aircraft and the Wessex airliner.

== Variants ==
Widgeon I
Powered by one 35 hp Blackburne Thrush radial engine. One built.
Widgeon II
Rebuild of Widgeon I with 60 hp Armstrong Siddeley Genet radial.
Widgeon III
Redesign for production. Powered by ADC Cirrus II or III inline engine, Genet II radial, ABC Hornet or de Havilland Gipsy. 18 built.
Widgeon IIIA
Variant of Widgeon III with metal fuselage and new undercarriage. Powered by Cirrus or Gipsy engine. Seven built.

== Specifications (IIIA) ==
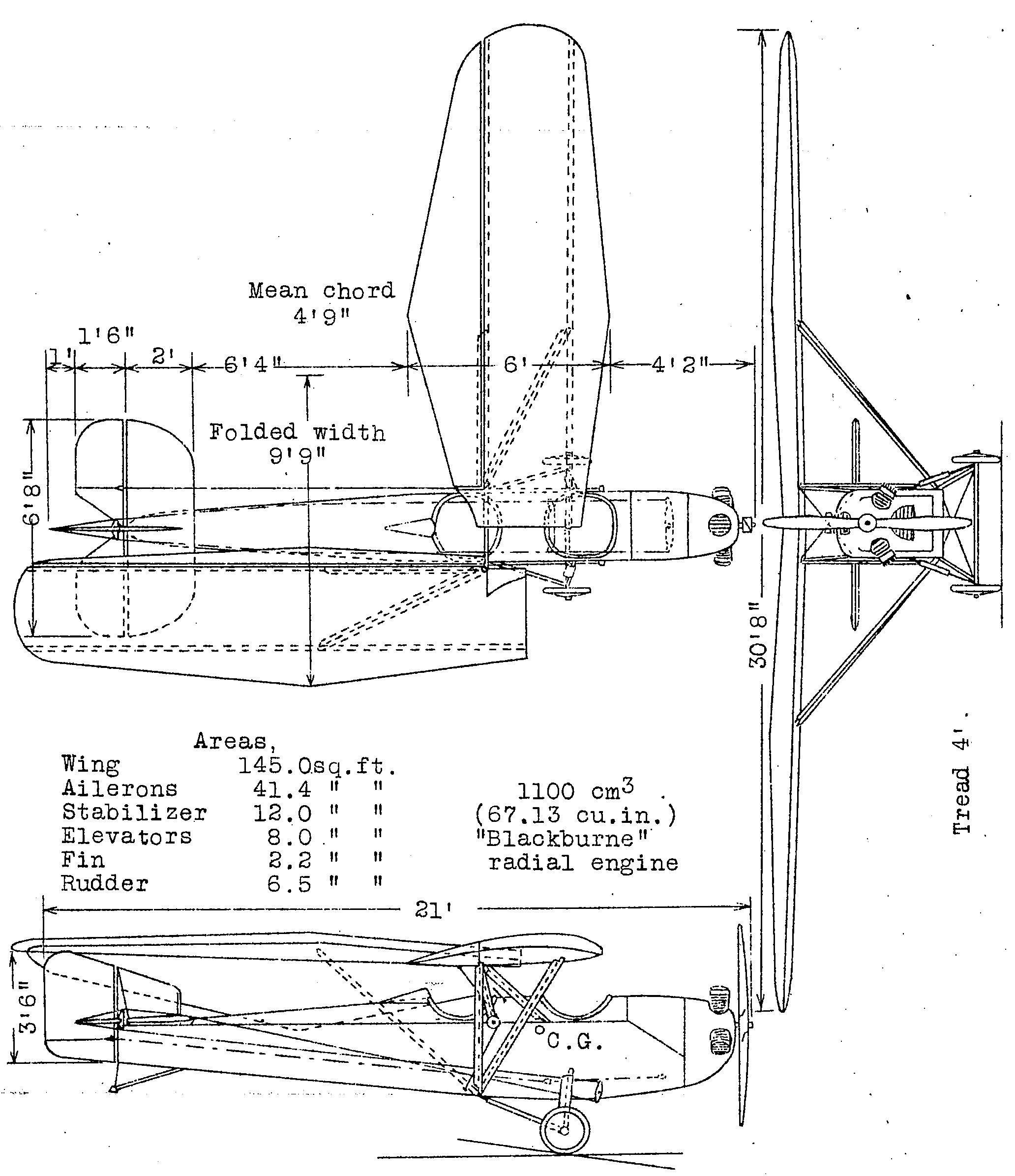
Westland Widgeon I 3-view drawing from NACA-TM-289

Data from British Civil Aircraft since 1919 Volume III

General characteristics

- Crew: 2
- Length: 23 ft 5 1/4 in (7.14 m)
- Wingspan: 36 ft 4 1/2 in (11.09 m)
- Width: 11 ft 9 in (3.58 m) (folded)
- Height: 8 ft 5 in (2.57 m)
- Wing area: 200 sq ft (19 m^{2})
- Airfoil: RAF 34
- Empty weight: 935 lb (424 kg)
- Max takeoff weight: 1,650 lb (748 kg)
- Powerplant: 1 × Cirrus Hermes II 4-cylinder air-cooled in-line piston engine, 120 hp (89 kW)
- Propellers: 2-bladed fixed-pitch propeller

Performance

- Maximum speed: 104 mph (167 km/h, 90 kn)
- Cruise speed: 86 mph (138 km/h, 75 kn)
- Range: 315 mi (507 km, 274 nmi)
- Service ceiling: 15,000 ft (4,600 m)
- Rate of climb: 640 ft/min (3.3 m/s)

== See also ==
- Kookaburra, a Widgeon lost during a 1929 search for another airplane in Australia and rediscovered in 1978

Related development

- Westland Woodpigeon

Aircraft of comparable role, configuration, and era

- Hawker Cygnet
- de Havilland Moth
