= Spartan Arrow =

1930s British aircraft

Arrow
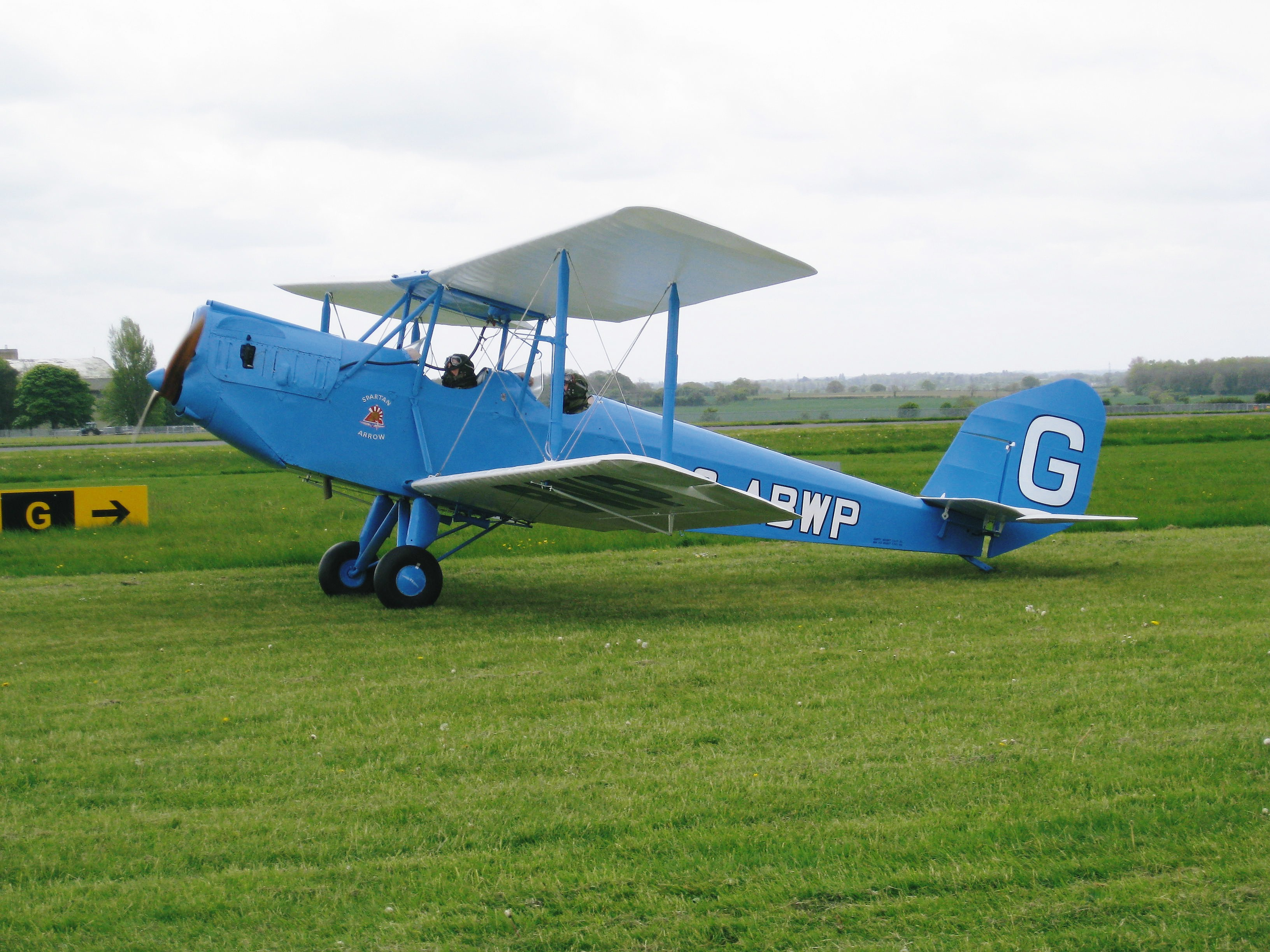
- Spartan Arrow 1 G-ABWP built in 1932 at Kemble Airfield, Glos, in May 2009

General information
- Type: Tourer
- Manufacturer: Spartan Aircraft Limited
- Number built: 15

History
- Manufactured: 1931-1933
- First flight: 1930

The Spartan Arrow is a British two-seat biplane aircraft of the early 1930s, built by Spartan Aircraft Limited.

== History ==
Built as a successor to the company's first design the Simmonds Spartan, the Arrow was a two-seat biplane with a spruce and plywood fuselage. The prototype G-AAWY first flew in May 1930 with a Cirrus Hermes II engine. The 13 production aircraft that followed used mainly the de Havilland Gipsy II engine.

One aircraft, G-ABBE, was fitted with floats and evaluated as a seaplane in 1931. It was converted back to a landplane and later sold in New Zealand, where it was renumbered as ZK-ACQ. A second aircraft, G-ABHD, was sold to Australia where it was renumbered as VH-UQD. A third aircraft, G-ACHG, was sold to Denmark where it was renumbered as OY-DUK.

One aircraft, G-ABST, was built to test a new air-cooled Napier engine (later knowns as the Javelin). The second prototype G-AAWY was also used by Cirrus Aero Engines as an engine test bed. Production of the Arrow ended in 1933.

== Production ==
Two prototypes and 13 production aircraft were built at Weston, Southampton, and after 20 February 1931 at East Cowes, Isle of Wight.

Tail Number	    Model     Serial      Location
 G-AAWY		Spartan Arrow	51	United Kingdom
 G-AAWZ		Spartan Arrow	52	United Kingdom
 G-ABBE		Spartan Arrow	75	United Kingdom
 K-ACQ		Spartan Arrow	75	 New Zealand
 G-ABKL		Spartan Arrow	76	United Kingdom
 G-ABGW		Spartan Arrow	77	United Kingdom
 G-ABWP		Spartan Arrow	78	United Kingdom
 G-ABWR		Spartan Arrow	79	United Kingdom
 G-ABHD		Spartan Arrow	80	United Kingdom
 VH-UQD		Spartan Arrow	80	  Australia
 G-ABHR		Spartan Arrow	81	United Kingdom
 G-ABMK		Spartan Arrow	82	United Kingdom
 G-ABOB		Spartan Arrow	83	United Kingdom
 G-ACHE		Spartan Arrow	84	United Kingdom
 G-ACHF		Spartan Arrow	85	United Kingdom
 G-ACHG		Spartan Arrow	86	United Kingdom
 OY-DUK		Spartan Arrow	86	   Denmark
 G-ABST		Spartan Arrow	87	United Kingdom

== Operators ==
The aircraft was operated by flying clubs and private individuals:

Australia
Denmark
New Zealand
Norway
Sweden
United Kingdom

== Surviving aircraft ==
G-ABWP a Cirrus Hermes II powered Arrow (constructor's number 78) survives in flying condition based at Redhill Aerodrome in England.

== Specifications ==
Data from Saunders and Saro Aircraft since 1917

General characteristics

- Length: 25 ft 0 in (7.62 m)
- Wingspan: 30 ft 7 in (9.34 m)
- Height: 9 ft 6 in (2.90 m)
- Wing area: 251 sq ft (23.3 m^{2})
- Empty weight: 965 lb (439 kg)
- Max takeoff weight: 1,750 lb (795 kg)
- Powerplant: 1 × de Havilland Gipsy II inline piston, 120 hp (90 kW)

Performance

- Maximum speed: 92 kn (106 mph, 171 km/h)
- Range: 376 nmi (432 mi, 696 km)
- Rate of climb: 830 ft/min (4.2 m/s)
