= Short Mussel =

Monoplane built by Short Brothers (1926–1933)

S.7 Mussel
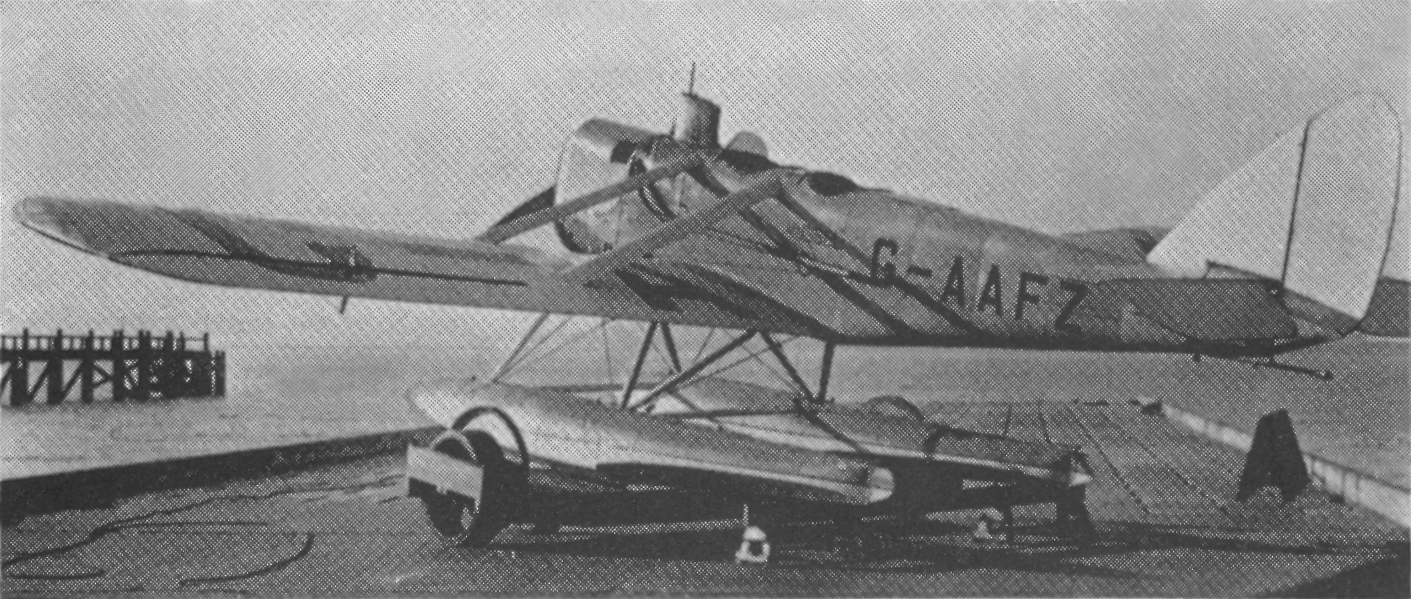
- Short Mussel II, Felixstowe, June 1929

General information
- Type: Experimental and trainer
- National origin: United Kingdom
- Manufacturer: Short Brothers
- Number built: 2

History
- First flight: 6 April 1926
- Retired: 15 September 1933

The Short S.7 Mussel was a single-engined two-seat monoplane built by Short Brothers to test the performance of their duralumin monocoque floats. Two were built.

== Development ==
Having demonstrated the watertightness and corrosion resistance of duralumin monocoque flying boat hulls with the Short Cockle, Shorts became leaders in the design of metal floats for seaplanes. The floats for both the Supermarine S.4 and Gloster III Schneider Cup seaplanes were built by Shorts. They had built their own hydrodynamic testing canal at their Rochester base to explore the performance of floats on the water and decided to build a small aircraft to test them in flight. This was the Short S.7 Mussel; the name was a natural complement to the Cockle but also a nod to "Mussel Manor", the clubhouse on Shorts' first airfield at Sheppey.

It was a two-seat, single-engined low-winged monoplane, mounted originally on twin floats. Like the slightly earlier Short Cockle, Satellite and Springbok, it had a duralumin monocoque fuselage of oval cross section. There were a pair of tandem open cockpits over the wing fitted with dual controls. Contemporary commentators regarded the mounting of the upright four cylinder 60 hp (45 kW) ADC Cirrus I engine as particularly neatly done, in a U-shaped extension of the monocoque which initially left the top of the engine exposed. This engine was changed for an 85 hp (63 kW) Cirrus II in January 1928. The fuel tank was immediately behind the fire wall, high enough to gravity feed the carburettor. There was a direct reading fuel gauge above the tank, just in front of the forward cockpit, enclosed a in variety of fairings over the Mussel's lifetime.

The constant chord wings were gimbal mounted to the lower fuselage, with pairs of streamlined compression struts from about 30% span to the upper fuselage just ahead of each cockpit. The wing spars were duralumin structures, though the first of the two Mussels had spruce ribs. The wing section was the untried, thick RAF 33. The wings and empennage were fabric covered; the fin and unbalanced rudder had a shape not unlike the de Haviiland vertical tail and the horizontal tail was externally braced from below.

The all-important floats were similar to those Shorts had made for the Gloster III, single stepped, small heeled and long enough that the Mussel sat in flight position on the water, not on a tail float like their many earlier seaplanes. This first set of floats was mounted with two pairs of struts to the lower fuselage fore and aft, with a pair of cross bracing struts between the floats. The Mussel also had a built in tail skid in anticipation of a landplane configuration.

The performance of the Mussel on its first flight, piloted by John Lankester Parker on 6 April 1926 was disappointing, but the problem was traced to wing-root interference and solved with fabric root fillets. Thereafter it seems to have been a pleasant machine to fly and one that met its original objectives. The first Mussel was lost when Eustace Short flew clipped a mast in August 1928; Short was unhurt but the Mussel was damaged beyond economic repair. Its replacement, the Mussel II first flew on 17 May 1929. It was similar to the first machine, but had metal ribbed wings of NACA M.12 section; a flat sided fuselage near the wing roots to avoid the need for filleting and water rudders on the floats. It was powered by a 90 hp (67 kW) Cirrus III engine until August 1930, when it was replaced with a de Havilland Gipsy II.

== Operational history ==
On its first flights the Mussel I was configured as a seaplane, then spent a fortnight at the end of September 1926 as a landplane, appearing unsuccessfully in the Grosvenor Challenge Cup. In October it was back on floats of a different design. This pattern repeated through to the final accident; during that time the Mussel flew with floats for the Short Crusader Schneider Trophy racer and for the de Havilland Moth. Shorts set up a production line for the successful Moth floats.

Mary, Lady Heath set a climb height record in the Mussel, reaching 13,400 ft after 1 hour 32 min) on 14 July 1928. Her passenger for the record attempt was Sicele O'Brien (the second woman to hold a commercial licence in Ireland and UK )

The Mussel II also spent time as both landplane and seaplane. Until March 1930 both Mussels had used what was in the UK at least the standard two float configuration. In that month a single long central float arrangement, similar to one built by Shorts for a de Havilland Gipsy Moth the previous summer. The single float required wing tip stabilising floats, and these were strutted to the outer wing and braced with another pair of struts inboard, meeting the underside of the wing at the same point as the wing compression struts above, so running almost co-linearly with them and giving a shallow cross like look to the aircraft from the front. In its original form this undercarriage was amphibious, with main wheels mounted on a streamlined cross piece on the float, as on the Moth. The main axle could be rotated from the cockpit by turning a handwheel and hence raising or lowering the mainwheels. The water rudder on the float was reinforced to act as a small tailskid for use on land.

In June 1932 the Mussel II began flying as a landplane again with a central single wheel undercarriage, with wing tip and tail skids. It flew, but was hard to handle on the ground and reappeared in October with the central float but no land wheels. During 1933 it gained attention in races against speedboats. Its last flight was in September 1933.

One other significant event in Short Brothers' history involved the Mussel. Eustace Short had come to fixed wing flying quite late in life, and he learned on the Mussel I and continued on the Mussel II. One day he landed tidily on the Medway, but failed to turn the engine off, crossed the river and slid gently into the mud. It seems he died of a heart attack moments after touching down.

== Specifications (Mussel I, seaplane) ==
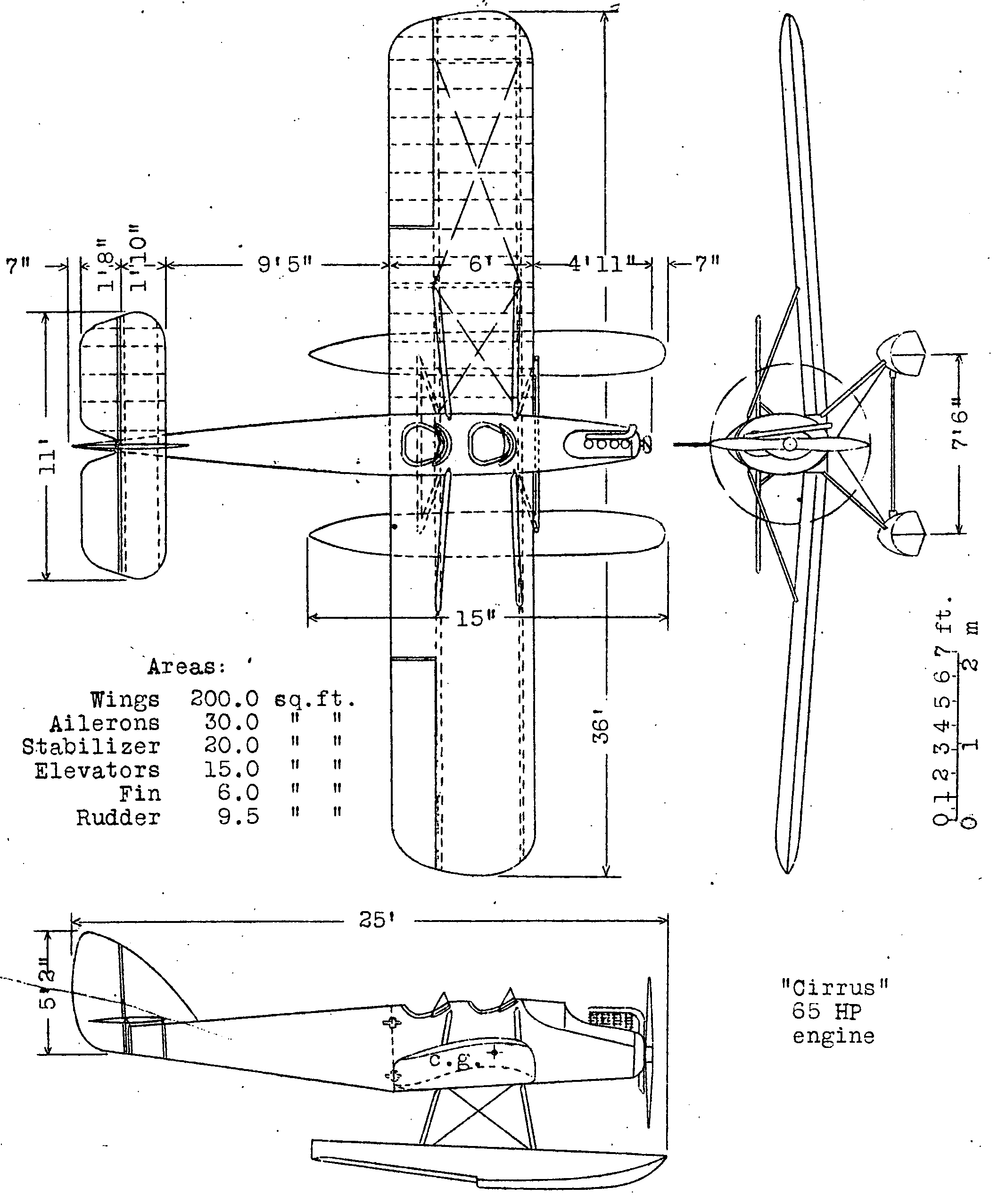
Short S.7 Mussel 3 view drawing from NACA Aircraft Circular No.5

Data from

General characteristics

- Crew: 2
- Length: 24 ft 0 in (7.32 m)
- Wingspan: 36 ft 0 in (10.97 m)
- Wing area: 200 sq ft (19 m^{2})
- Empty weight: 1,030 lb (467 kg)
- Gross weight: 1,576 lb (715 kg)
- Powerplant: 1 × ADC Cirrus I four-cylinder air-cooled inline engine, 65 hp (48 kW)

Performance

- Maximum speed: 82 mph (132 km/h, 71 kn)
- Range: 260 mi (420 km, 230 nmi)

== See also ==
Related lists

- List of flying boats and floatplanes
