= Avro Avian =

British biplane aircraft type

Avian
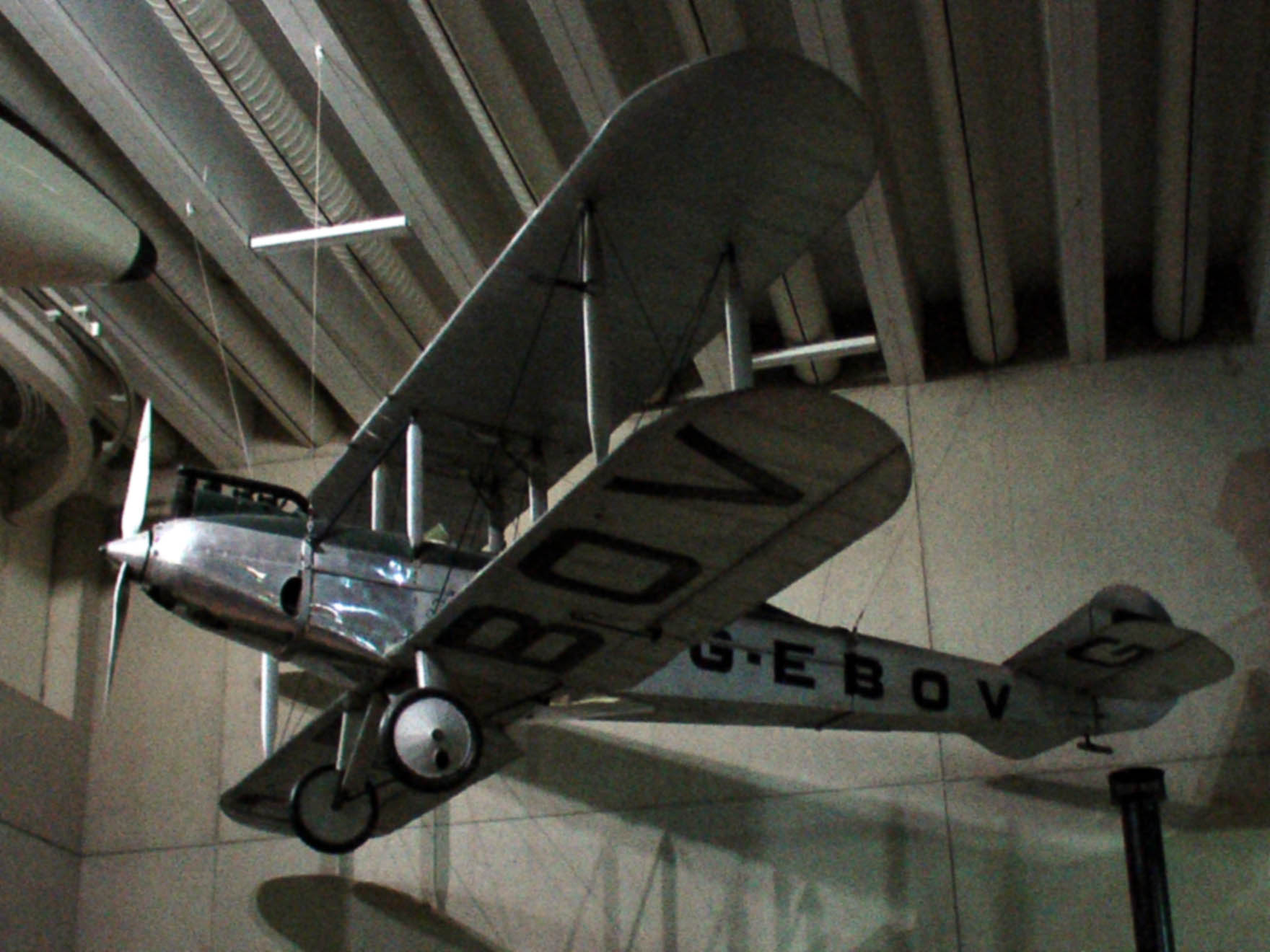
- Bert Hinkler's Avro Avian displayed at the Queensland Museum in Brisbane, Australia

General information
- Type: Tourer/Trainer
- Manufacturer: Avro
- Designer: Roy Chadwick
- Primary users: Private pilot owners Royal Canadian Air Force; South African Air Force; Chinese Naval Air Service; Estonian Air Force
- Number built: 405

History
- Manufactured: 1926–1928
- Introduction date: 1927
- First flight: 1926

The Avro Avian is a series of British light aircraft designed and built by Avro in the 1920s and 1930s. While the various versions of the Avian were sound aircraft, they were comprehensively outsold by the de Havilland Moth and its descendants. American examples manufactured under licence by the Whittesley Manufacturing Co. in Bridgeport, Connecticut are also known as the Whittesley Avian.

== Design and development ==
The Avro 581 Avian prototype was designed and built to compete in the Lympne light aircraft trials at Lympne Aerodrome in September 1926. Its wooden fuselage was based on that of the Avro 576 autogyro, but it was fitted with conventional biplane wings and powered by a 70 hp (50 kW) Armstrong Siddeley Genet engine. It performed well at the trials, but was eliminated due to engine failure.

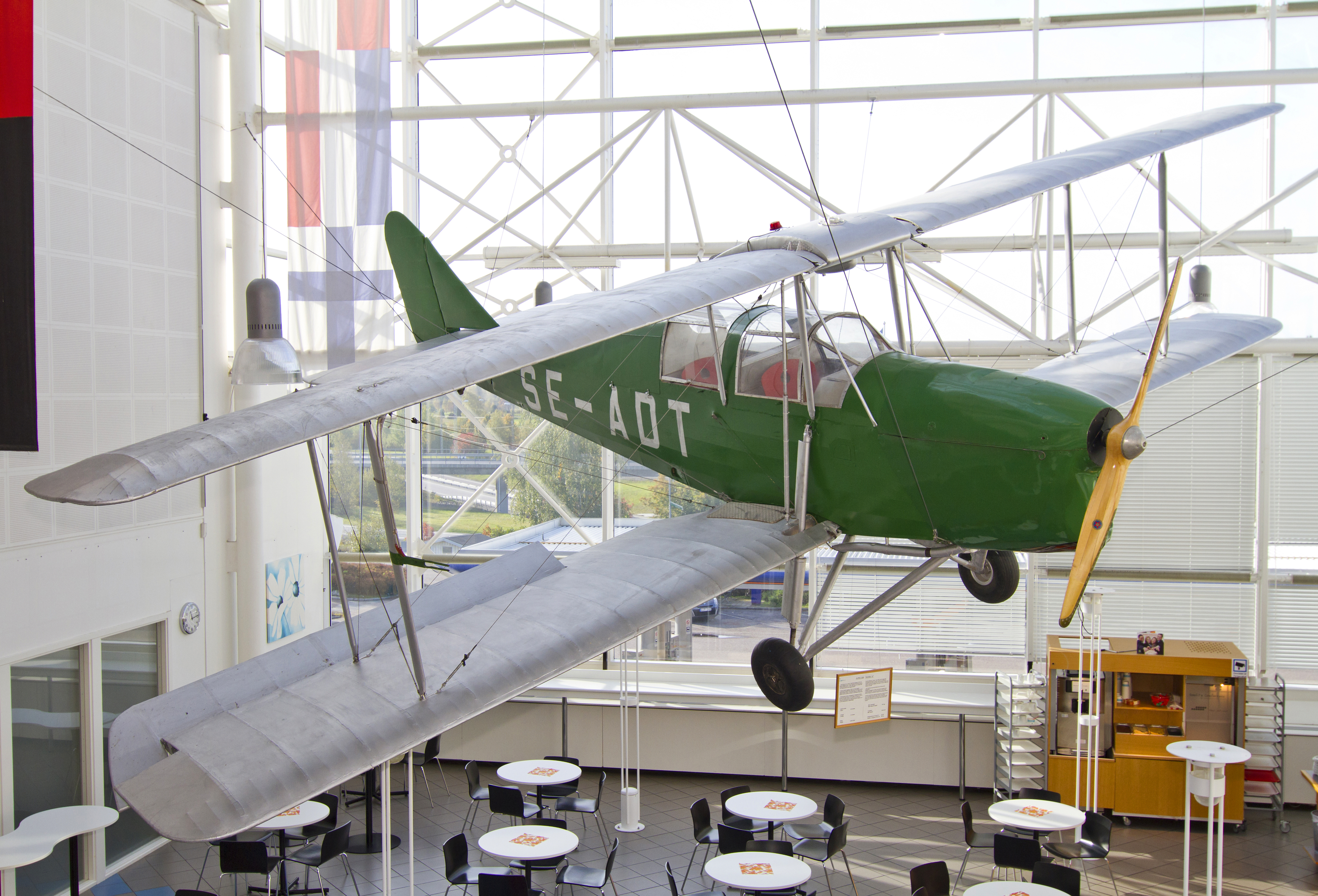
Avian IV, SE-ADT preserved in good condition and displayed in a café in a shopping center at Arlanda Stad close to Stockholm – Arlanda Airport, Sweden. It has now been moved to Arlanda Flygsamlingar.

In early 1927 it was re-engined with an 85 hp (63 kW) ADC Cirrus engine as the Type 581A and sold to Bert Hinkler.

Production aircraft were designated Type 594 and were built in a number of versions, mainly powered by Cirrus engines. A version with a welded steel tube fuselage was produced in 1929 as the Avro 616 Avian IVM to meet overseas requirements for an easier-to-repair structure. This version was built in the largest numbers, with approximately 190 built.

The Avian was also produced under licence in Canada, by Ottawa Car Manufacturing Company in Ottawa, Ontario.

== Operational history ==
While outsold by the de Havilland Moth and its derivatives—which first flew more than a year earlier than the Avian—the Avian was used extensively as a civil tourer or trainer, with many being sold overseas. Avians were assembled by the Whittesley Manufacturing Co., Bridgeport, Connecticut, USA, and the Ottawa Car Manufacturing Company, Canada, as well as by Avro itself.

After further modifications to wings and undercarriage as the Avro 581E, Hinkler used this aircraft for a series of long-distance flights, culminating in a 15½-day solo flight from Croydon, UK to Darwin, Australia. In 1998 Lang Kidby recreated this flight in a 1927 Type 594 Avian VH-UFZ (ex G-AUFZ)

Avro 594 Avian III (c/n R3/AV/101) was owned by Lady Mary Heath and Amelia Earhart. Earhart's Avian had an 84 hp (63 kW) Cirrus Mk II engine. It was originally registered to Lady Heath on 29 October 1927 and given the UK aircraft marking G-EBUG. When Earhart brought it to the United States it was assigned "unlicensed aircraft identification mark" 7083; aircraft not officially certificated in the United States were allowed to be flown as unlicensed but identified aircraft. Avian 7083 was used on Earhart's first long solo flight, which occurred just as Amelia was coming into the national spotlight. By making the trip in August 1928, she became the first woman to fly solo across the North American continent and back. In 2001 Carlene Mendita recreated this flight in Greg Herrick's Type 594 Avian which he had purchased from Lang Kidby. At the time Herrick purchased the Avian from Kidby, two years prior, it was the oldest flying aircraft in Australia. It is now based in Minneapolis, Minnesota.

Wilfrid R. "Wop" May used a 594 to make his January 1929 mercy flight with diphtheria antitoxin from Edmonton to Fort Vermilion, Alberta.

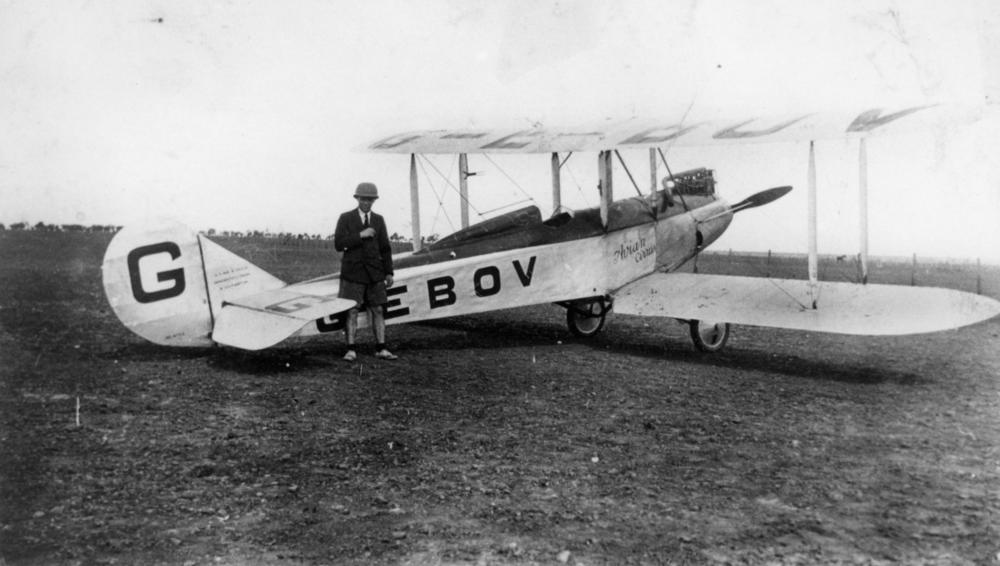

An Avian (Red Rose) was used by Bill Lancaster on a successful long distance flight to Australia, and another (Southern Cross Minor) on his final record attempt to South Africa in 1933.

In July 1930, Winifred Brown won the King's Cup Race flying Cirrus III Avian. One Avian, piloted by Sydney Thorn, took part in the Challenge International de Tourisme 1930 with moderate success (16th place).

On 7 January 1931, Guy Menzies flew an Avian, the Southern Cross Junior, from Australia to New Zealand. He was the first person to fly solo across the Tasman Sea.

A single Genet-powered Avian II was bought by the Royal Air Force, while Avians were also bought by the South African Air Force, the Chinese Naval Air Service, the Estonian Air Force and the Royal Canadian Air Force.

Aviator Beryl Markham used an Avian extensively in East Africa in the 1930s.

== Variants ==
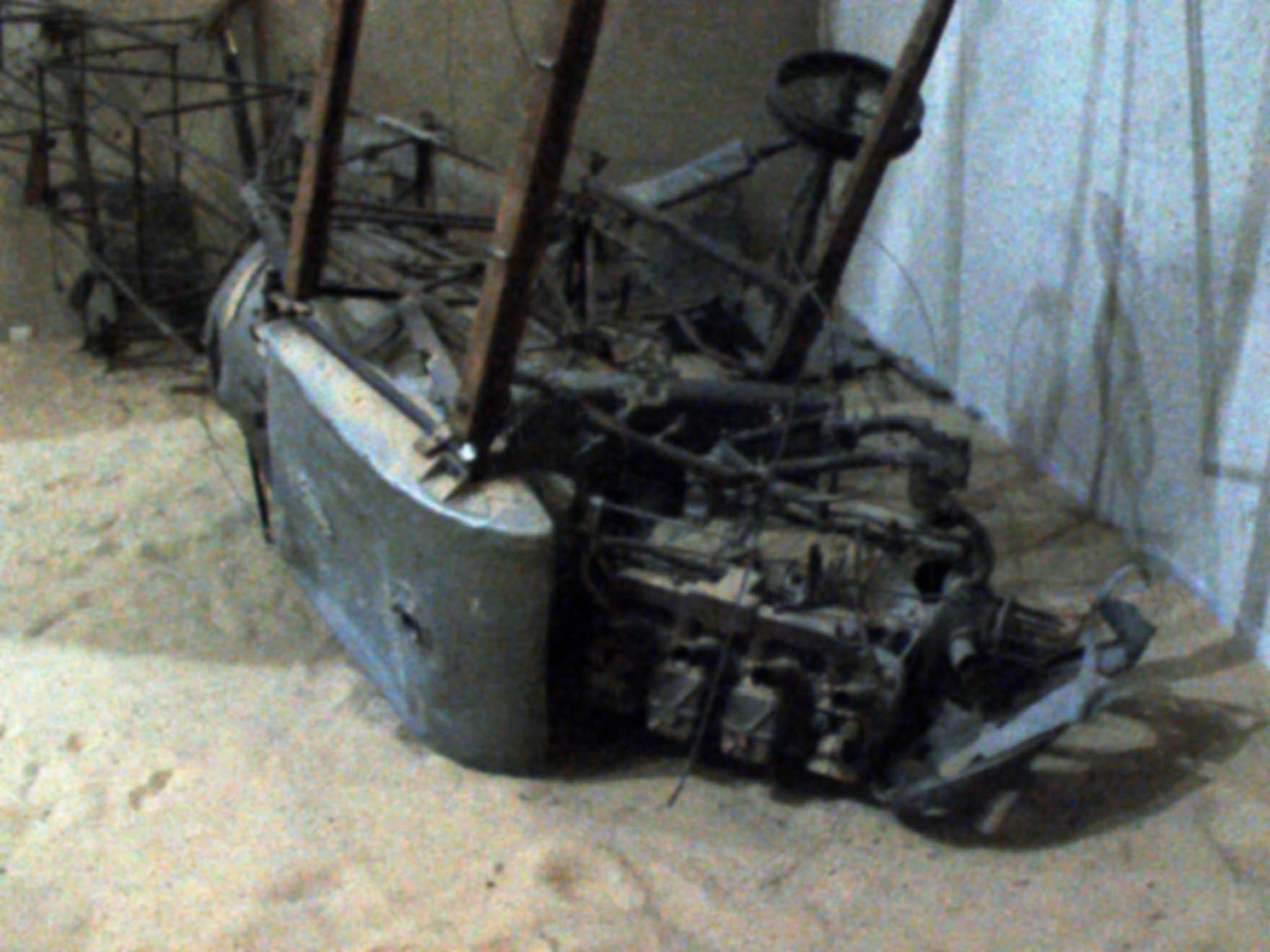
The wreckage of the Southern Cross Minor recovered from the Sahara Desert and displayed at the Queensland Museum

Avro 581 Avian
First prototype, one 70 hp (52 kW) Armstrong Siddeley Genet.
Avro 581A
Modified first prototype, one 85 hp (63 kW) ADC Cirrus and reduced span wings.
Avro 581E
Further modified Avro 581A for long distance flights, with new wings and modified fuselage.
Avro 594 Avian I
Preproduction aircraft, two built.
Avro 594 Avian II
Initial production, 85 hp (63 kW) Cirrus II engine, nine built.
Avro 594 Avian III
Modified engine mount and tubular steel struts, 33 built.
Avro 594 Avian IIIA
95 hp (71 kW) Cirrus III engine, 58 built.
Avro 594 Avian IV
Revised undercarriage and ailerons, 90 built.
Avro 605 Avian
Two Avro 594 Avian IIIs were converted into floatplanes.
Avro 616 Avian IVM
Steel tube fuselage. Powered by 105 hp (78 kW) Cirrus Hermes I or 100 hp (75 kW) Armstrong Siddeley Genet Major, approximately 190 built.
Avro 616 Sports Avian
Version for racing with reduced drag, 16 built.
Avro 616 Avian IVA
modified one-off long range version for Charles Kingsford Smith, Southern Cross Junior, 120 hp (90 kW) de Havilland Gipsy II engine, with additional fuel tank and revised 30 ft span wings.
Avro 616 Avian V
Long range single-seater again built for Charles Kingsford Smith, Southern Cross Minor. Bill Lancaster would later attempt to fly solo from England to South Africa in this aircraft, and die in the attempt.
Avro 625 Avian Monoplane
Low-wing monoplane development, two built.

== Operators ==
=== Military operators ===
Canada

- Royal Canadian Air Force

China

- Chinese Nationalist Air Force
- Chinese Naval Air Service

Estonia

- Estonian Air Force

South Africa

- South African Air Force

Spain

- Spanish Republican Air Force

Spain

- Spanish Air Force

United Kingdom

- Royal Air Force

== Surviving aircraft ==
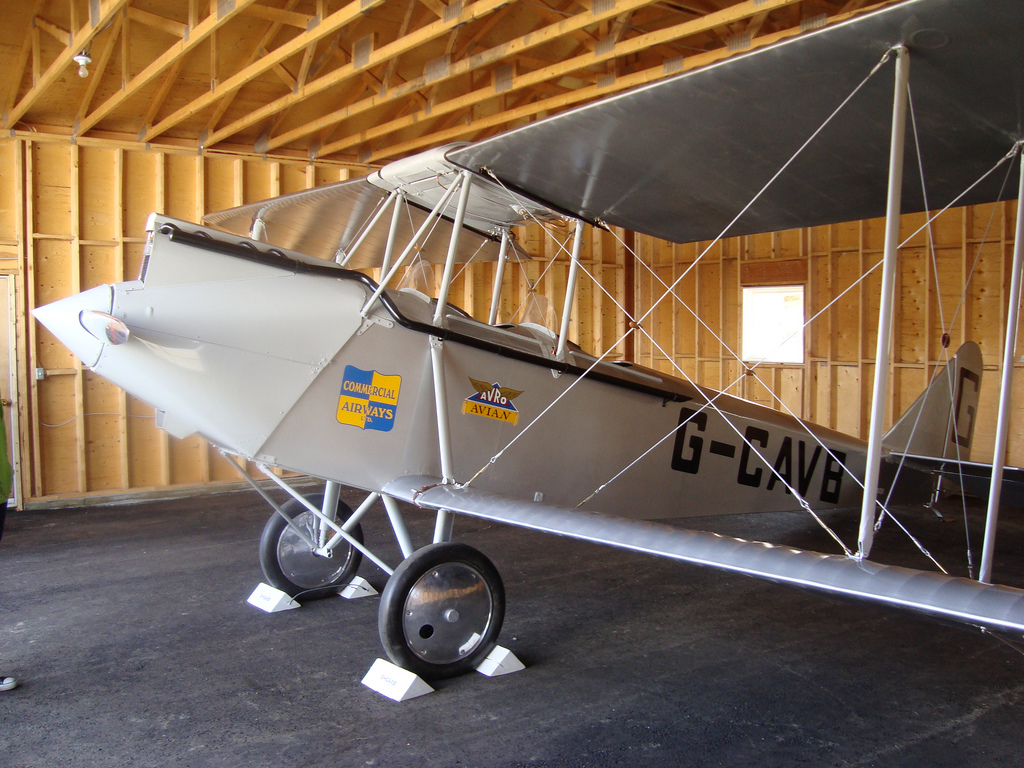
Replica of Wop May's Avian at Fort Edmonton Park, Edmonton, Alberta.

- 5116 – 581 on display at the Queensland Museum in Brisbane, Queensland. It is G-EBOV, the prototype Avro Avian flown by Bert Hinkler on some of his record-breaking flights.
- R3/AV/127 – Avian IV airworthy at the Ala Doble Flying Collection in Esparto, California. It was once the oldest flying aircraft in Australia and has been converted from an Avian II configuration. It is painted to represent G-EBUG, an aircraft Amelia Earhart flew across the United States in 1928–1929.
- R3/CN/160 – Avian IIIA on static display at Hooton Park in Cheshire. It carries G-EBZM and is a composite of several others.
- CN/171 G-ACGT, a Genet II powered Type 594B Avian III under restoration at Coventry, Warwickshire.
- R3/CN/314 – Avian IVM on static display at the Canada Aviation and Space Museum in Ottawa, Ontario.
- R3/CN/316 – Avian IVM on display at the Reynolds-Alberta Museum in Wetaskiwin, Alberta. It has Genet engine installed and is painted as CF-CDV.
- R3/CN/318 – Avian IV on static display at Arlanda Flygsamlingar , close to Arlanda Airport north of Stockholm, Sweden.
- R3/CN/522 – Avian IV airworthy with Geoffrey Arthur Davis of Salisbury, South Australia.
- R3/CN/531 – Avian IV airworthy with Geoffrey Arthur Davis of Salisbury, South Australia.
- Replica – Avian IIIA on display at the Alberta Aviation Museum in Edmonton, Alberta. It is painted as G-CAVB as a memorial to a heroic flight by Wop May when he flew diphtheria medicine mid-winter to a village where an outbreak was occurring on the Canadian prairies.

== Specifications (Avian IVM) ==
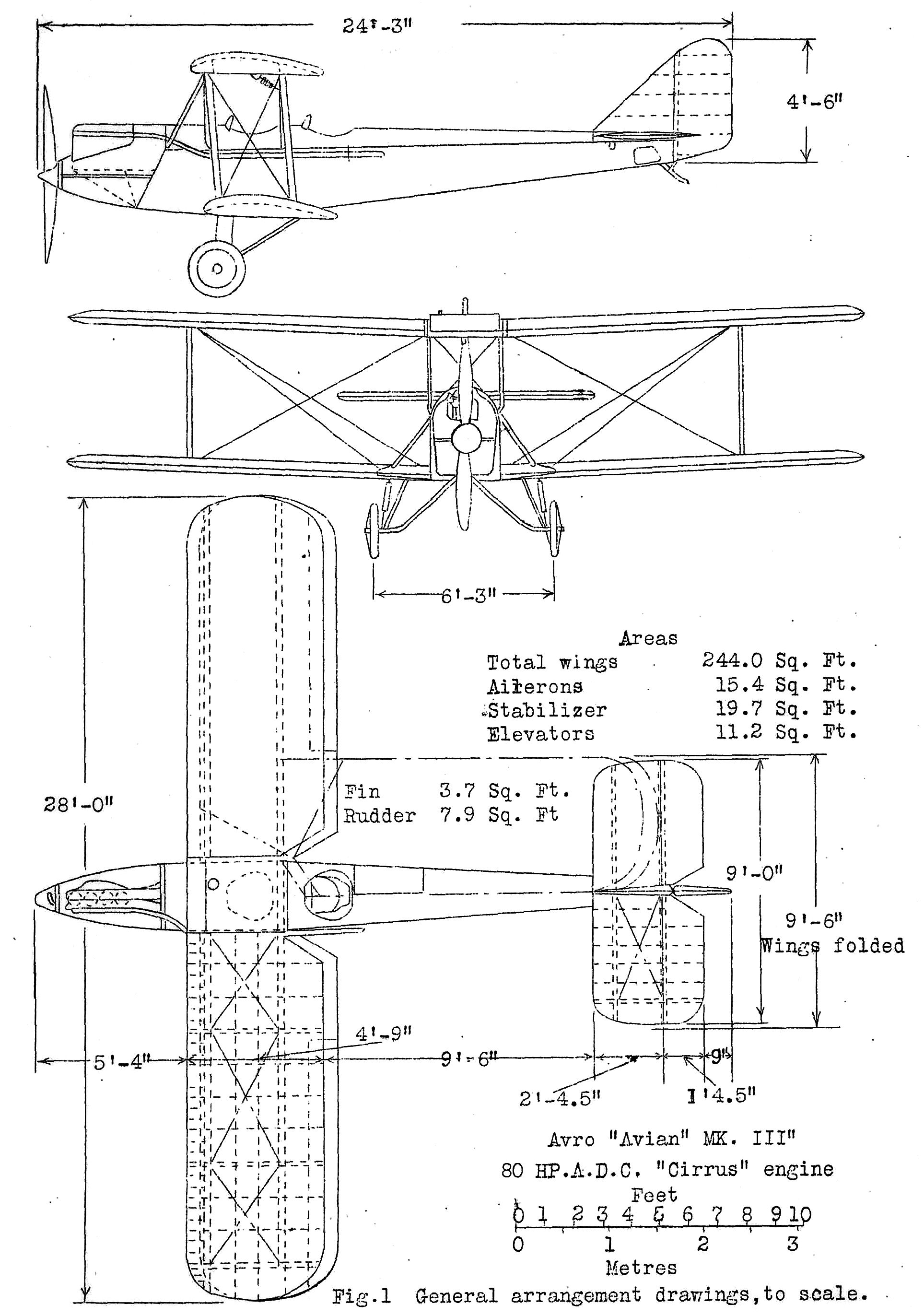
Avro Avian III 3-view drawing from NACA Aircraft Circular No.70

Data from British Civil Aircraft since 1919 Volume 1

General characteristics

- Crew: 2
- Length: 24 ft 3 in (7.39 m)
- Wingspan: 28 ft 0 in (8.53 m)
- Height: 8 ft 6 in (2.59 m)
- Wing area: 245 sq ft (22.8 m^{2})
- Empty weight: 1,005 lb (456 kg)
- Gross weight: 1,523 lb (691 kg)
- Powerplant: 1 × Cirrus Hermes I 4-cylinder air-cooled in-line piston engine, 105 hp (78 kW)
- Propellers: 2-bladed fixed-pitch propeller

Performance

- Maximum speed: 105 mph (169 km/h, 91 kn)
- Cruise speed: 90 mph (140 km/h, 78 kn)
- Range: 360 mi (580 km, 310 nmi)
- Service ceiling: 12,500 ft (3,800 m)
- Rate of climb: 600 ft/min (3.0 m/s)
- Wing loading: 6.21 lb/sq ft (30.3 kg/m^{2})
- Power/mass: 0.069 hp/lb (0.113 kW/kg)

== See also ==
- Wop May "The Race against Death – Mercy flight in an Avian."

Aircraft of comparable role, configuration, and era

- de Havilland Moth

Related lists

- List of aircraft of the Spanish Republican Air Force

== Notes ==
=== Bibliography ===
- Donald, David, ed. The Encyclopedia of World Aircraft. London: Aerospace Publishing, 1997. ISBN 1-85605-375-X.
- Gerdessen, Frederik. "Estonian Air Power 1918 – 1945". Air Enthusiast, No. 18, April – July 1982. pp. 61–76. ISSN 0143-5450.
- Grant, James Ritchie. "Anti-Clockwise: Australia the Wrong Way". Air Enthusiast, No. 82, July–August 1999, pp. 60–63. ISSN 0143-5450
- Jackson, A.J. Avro Aircraft since 1908. London: Putnam Aeronautical Books, 2nd edition, 1990. ISBN 0-85177-834-8.
- Jackson, A.J. British Civil Aircraft since 1919, Volume 1. London: Putnam, 1974. ISBN 0-370-10006-9.
- Prins, François (Winter 1993). "Brisbane's Heritage". Air Enthusiast. No. 52. pp. 26–27. ISSN 0143-5450.
