= Spartan Three Seater =

British plane

Three Seater
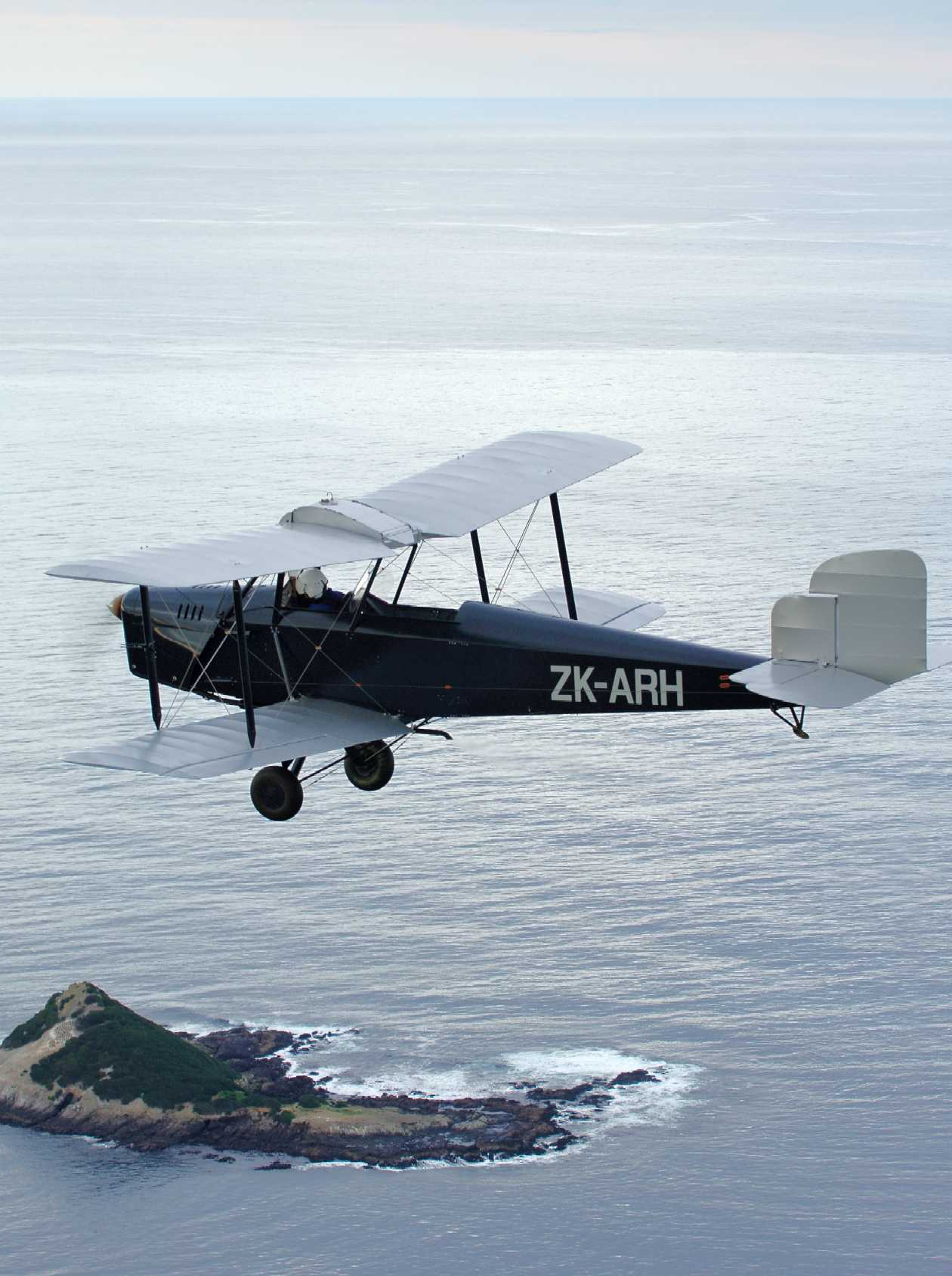
- ZK-ARH, the surviving Three Seater II, in New Zealand

General information
- Type: Tourer/Pleasure Flying
- Manufacturer: Spartan Aircraft Limited
- Number built: 25

History
- Introduction date: 1931
- First flight: 1930
- Developed from: Simmonds Spartan

The Spartan Three Seater was a British three-seat biplane touring and pleasure-flying aircraft built by Spartan Aircraft Limited.

== History ==
Built as a three-seat version of the Simmonds Spartan, the Three Seater was a biplane with a spruce and plywood fuselage. Although not many aircraft were built, the Three Seater was a mainstay of the pleasure flying business in the 1930s. The wings were designed to fold back easily, in order to be stored in a shed rather than requiring a dedicated hangar.

Following the first batch of aircraft, designated the Three Seater I, an improved version was built and designated as the Three Seater II. The six Three Seater IIs had improved visibility for the pilot and easier access for the passengers, and were powered by a 130 horsepower (97 kW) Cirrus Hermes IV engine.

One Three Seater II (registered as ZK-ARH) currently survives, owned by a private individual in New Zealand, having passed through British and Irish owners (as G-ABYN and EI-ABU) since its manufacture in June 1932.

== Variants ==
- Three Seater I - 19 aircraft
- Three Seater II - 6 aircraft

== Operators ==
The aircraft was mainly operated by flying clubs and private individuals:

Australia
Republic of Ireland
Iraq

- Iraq Airwork Limited

South Africa
Tanganyika
United Kingdom

- British Airways Limited

== Specifications (Three Seater II) ==
General characteristics

- Length: 26 ft 3 in (8.0 m)
- Wingspan: 28 ft 10 in (8.79 m)
- Height: 9 ft 8 in (2.95 m)
- Wing area: 240 sq ft (22 m^{2})
- Empty weight: 1,030 lb (468 kg)
- Max takeoff weight: 1,680 lb (764 kg)
- Powerplant: 1 × Cirrus Hermes I or II inline piston, 120 hp (90 kW)

Performance

- Maximum speed: 93 kn (107 mph, 172 km/h)
- Range: 226 nmi (260 mi, 419 km)
- Rate of climb: 750 ft/min (3.8 m/s)
