= List of de Havilland aircraft =

This is a list of aircraft produced or proposed by Geoffrey de Havilland or designed at the de Havilland Aircraft Company from its founding in 1920 until its purchase by (and integration into) the Hawker Siddeley Group in 1959.

The aircraft are ordered by de Havilland model number; the numbers started with de Havilland's employment at the Airco company as chief designer. Although Airco built the planes, their design was owned by de Havilland and when de Havilland started his own company, he continued the numbering. The numbering sequence continued for later designs of de Havilland's aircraft company, even if they were designed by a factory team with little input from de Havilland himself. The DH.89, for example, was the 89th de Havilland design.

The designs DH.121 and DH.125 which were under development when de Havilland lost its separate identity under Hawker Siddeley, retained their numbering and were produced as the Hawker Siddeley HS-121 Trident and the Hawker Siddeley HS.125.

The list does not include aircraft designed by de Havilland Canada or de Havilland Australia, founded as de Havilland subsidiaries.

A separate list includes his earlier designs prior to the company formation including his first two family funded Biplanes, his various designs at the HM Balloon Factory - (later the Royal Aircraft Factory), and later his various designs at The Aircraft Manufacturing Company Limited (Airco).

== Designs prior to company foundation ==
These are designs by Geoffrey de Havilland while working for himself or for other manufacturers.

Design number	Aircraft	First flight	Remarks
	Biplane No. 1	December 1909	Single-seat biplane. Built with money borrowed from his maternal grandfather, de Havilland's first aircraft took two years to complete. Unfortunately, he crashed it during its first very short flight at Seven Barrows near Litchfield, Hampshire in December 1909.
	Biplane No. 2	25 September 1910	Single-seat pusher configuration biplane – (became the F.E.1) After the crash of his first aircraft, he built a fresh biplane, making his first flight in it from a meadow near Newbury in September 1910.
F.E.1	Biplane No. 2	25 September 1910	Single-seat pusher configuration biplane – became the F.E.1 In December 1910, de Havilland joined HM Balloon Factory at Farnborough, which was to become the Royal Aircraft Factory He sold his second aeroplane (which he had used to teach himself to fly) to his new employer for £400. It became the F.E.1, the first aircraft to bear an official Royal Aircraft Factory designation. For the next three years, de Havilland designed, or participated in the design of, a number of experimental types at the "Factory". Up to about 1913 the designation letters referred to the general layout of the aircraft, derived from a French manufacturer or designer famous for that type: S.E. = Santos Experimental (Canard or tail-first layout) B.E. = Blériot Experimental (Tractor or propeller-first layout) F.E. = Farman Experimental (Pusher or propeller behind the pilot layout) From 1913/4 onwards this was changed to a designation based on the role for which the aircraft was designed. The B.S.1 of 1913 was a one-off anomaly, combining both systems: Blériot (tractor) Scout (fighter).
S.E.1	Santos Experimental 1 Royal Aircraft Factory	11 June 1911	Experimental research aircraft - originally based on a Santos monoplane design, it emerged as a pusher biplane with large balanced fore-elevators, similar in basic layout to the Wright Flyer, but with a fully covered fuselage. Ailerons were fitted to the top wing, and twin balanced rudders were mounted behind the propeller and powered by a 60 hp (45 kW) E.N.V. Type F engine.
F.E.2	Farman Experimental 2 (Pusher type) Royal Aircraft Factory	18 August 1911	Two Seat (Pusher) Fighter / reconnainnance - The new aircraft resembled the final form of the F.E.1, with no front elevator, but seated a crew of two in a wood and canvas nacelle, and was powered by a 50 hp (37 kW) Gnome rotary engine.
B.E.1	Bleriot Experimental 1 (Tractor type) Royal Aircraft Factory	4 December 1911	Two Seat (Tractor) Biplane trainer It was a two-bay tractor biplane with parallel-chord unstaggered wings with rounded ends and used wing warping for roll control and powered by a 60 hp (45 kW) water-cooled Wolseley engine.
B.E.2	Bleriot Experimental 2 (Tractor type) Royal Aircraft Factory	1 February 1912	Two Seat (Tractor) Biplane trainer/bomber The B.E.2 was almost identical to the B.E.1, differing principally in being powered by a 60 hp (45 kW) air-cooled V-8 Renault and in having equal-span wings.
B.S.1 / S.E.2	Bleriot Scout 1 Scout Experimental 2 (Tractor type) Royal Aircraft Factory	March 1913	Single Seat (Tractor) Scout. small tractor biplane, was named the B.S.1 (standing for Blériot Scout) after Louis Blériot, a pioneer of tractor configuration aircraft. It had a wooden monocoque circular section fuselage, and single-bay wings. Lateral control was by wing warping. It was powered by a two-row, 14-cylinder Gnome rotary engine rated at 100 hp (75 kW).
DH.1	Airco DH.1	January 1915	Two-seat fighter/general purpose biplane In December 1913, de Havilland was appointed an inspector of aircraft for the Aeronautical Inspection Directorate. Unhappy at leaving design work at the Royal Aircraft Factory, in May 1914 he was recruited to become the chief designer at The Aircraft Manufacturing Company Limited (Airco), in Hendon. He designed many aircraft for Airco, all designated by his initials, DH. Large numbers of de Havilland-designed aircraft were used during the First World War, flown by the Royal Flying Corps/Royal Air Force.
DH.2	Airco DH.2	1 June 1915	Single-seat pusher biplane fighter
DH.3	Airco DH.3		Twin-engine long-range day bomber
DH.4	Airco DH.4	August 1916	Two-seat biplane day bomber
DH.5	Airco DH.5	October 1916	Single-seat biplane fighter
DH.6	Airco DH.6	1916	Biplane trainer
DH.7		Not built	Single-seat tractor fighter project with a Rolls-Royce Falcon engine, not built due to non-availability of engine
DH.8		Not built	Pusher fighter projected to be fitted with a Coventry Ordnance Works gun, not built due to delays in gun development and non-availability of specified engine
DH.9	Airco DH.9	July 1917	Two-seat day bomber biplane
DH.10	Airco DH.10 Amiens	4 March 1918	Twin-engine heavy bomber biplane developed from the DH.3
DH.11	Airco DH.11 Oxford	1919	Twin-engined day bomber
DH.12	DH.12	Not built	Improved DH.11 powered by Dragonfly engines and modified gunner's position – unbuilt
DH.13			Not used, probably due to superstition
DH.14	(Airco) Okapi	1919	Two-seat day bomber to replace DH.4 and DH.9
DH.15	Airco Gazelle	1919	Experimental aircraft similar to DH.9
DH.16	Airco DH.16	1919	Redesigned DH.9 with four-seat enclosed cockpit for use as a commercial biplane
DH.17		Not built	16 seat biplane airliner powered by two Rolls-Royce Condor engines, featuring an enclosed cabin and semi-retractable landing gear. Not built for a lack of orders due to post-WWI slump.
DH.18	(Airco) DH.18	1920	8 seat, single-engine commercial aircraft
DH.19		Not built	Rolls-Royce Falcon powered two-seat cabin biplane
DH.20		Not built	ABC Wasp powered single-seat sports biplane
DH.21		Not built	Large civil transport design study with two engines driving one propeller

== de Havilland Aircraft Company designs ==
Design number	Aircraft	First flight	Remarks
DH.22		Not built	Single-engine pusher biplane with conventional rear fuselage instead of outriggers and engine mounted on upper mainplane
DH.23		Not built	Single-engine, four-seat biplane flying boat powered by a Napier Lion engine. Although registered G-EARN on 9 March 1920, the aircraft was not built.
DH.24		Not built	Larger variant of the DH.18 with a Napier Lion engine. Design not proceeded with.
DH.25		Not built	Large 10-seat civil transport powered by three Liberty engines driving a single propeller.
DH.26		Not built	Single-engine transport monoplane. Design dropped in favor of the larger DH.29.
DH.27	Derby	13 October 1922	Heavy biplane day bomber for Specification 2/20
DH.28		Not built	Single-engine troop transport biplane for Air Ministry Type 12 Specification with two crew in open cockpits. A similar layout was used on the later DH.54.
DH.29	Doncaster	5 July 1921	Long-range research monoplane for the Air Ministry
DH.30	Denbigh	Not built	High-wing reconnaissance variant of the DH.29 to Air Ministry D of R Type 3 requirement of 1922.
DH.31		Not built	Single-engine reconnaissance biplane.
DH.32		Not built	Eight-passenger biplane airliner powered by a Rolls-Royce Eagle engine to Air Ministry Specification 18/21 as an improvement of the DH.18. Construction was to begin in 1922 but due to operators requests the Napier Lion-powered DH.34 was developed instead.
DH.33		Not built	Single-seat shipborne fighter.
DH.34	de Havilland DH.34	26 March 1922	Biplane airliner, based on DH.32
DH.35		Not built	Two-seat reconnaissance biplane to have been powered by a Armstrong Siddeley Jaguar engine for Air Ministry Specification D of R Type 3A.
DH.36		Not built	Three-seat, single-engine coastal defense torpedo bomber biplane to Air Ministry Specification D of R Type I. Similar to the DH.27.
DH.37	de Havilland DH.37	June 1922	Touring biplane. Designed to special order.
DH.38		Not built	Two-seat general-purpose biplane powered by a single Napier Lion V engine for the Greek government, but no orders resulted.
DH.39		Not built	Proposed alternative version of DH.38 powered by a Rolls-Royce Eagle VIII engine.
DH.40		Not built	Proposed two-seat forestry patrol version of DH.39 for the Canadian Air Board.
DH.41		Not built	Proposed two-seat reconnaissance version of DH.38 to Air Ministry Specification D of R Type 3. Powered by a Napier Lion engine.
DH.42	Dormouse	25 July 1923	Reconnaissance fighter for Specification 22/22
DH.42A	Dingo I	12 March 1924	Bristol Jupiter III engine: slight (6 in/152 mm) increase in span
DH.42B	Dingo II	29 September 1926	Bristol Jupiter IV: same dimensions as DH.42A but with steel frame and greater weight
DH.43		Not built	Large biplane freighter powered by a Liberty 12 engine. Large cargo door on port side of fuselage.
DH.44		Not built	Biplane airliner with a Siddeley Puma engine.
DH.45		Not built	Three-seat torpedo bomber/coastal defense biplane with two Napier Lion engines. Based on DH.11.
DH.46		Not built	Single-seat lightweight sports monoplane. Later DH.53 was similar.
DH.47		Not built	Single-seat glider. Later DH.52 was similar.
DH.48		Not built	Single-seat forestry patrol biplane for the Royal Canadian Air Force. Similar to and based on the DH.9A, but powered by a Wolseley Viper engine and equipped with W/T.
DH.49		Not built	Modernized DH.9A, powered by a Rolls-Royce Eagle IX engine. Featured similar improvements to the DH.9J Stag. Offered for reconnaissance, light bombing and general purpose roles, but not accepted by the Air Ministry.
DH.50	de Havilland DH.50	30 July 1923	Four-passenger transport biplane
DH.51	de Havilland DH.51	1 July 1924	Three-seat biplane, private venture
DH.52	de Havilland DH.52	5 October 1922	Single-seat glider
DH.53	Humming Bird	2 October 1923	Single-seat monoplane
DH.54	Highclere	18 June 1924	12-passenger biplane airliner
DH.55		Not built	Seven-passenger biplane airliner based on the DH.54 and powered by three Airdisco engines.
DH.56	Hyena	17 May 1925	Army biplane developed to Specification 33/26
DH.57		Not built	12 passenger biplane airliner based on the DH.54 and powered by three Siddeley Puma engines.
DH.58		Not built	Scaled-up version of DH.57 for 20 passengers and powered by three Napier Lion engines.
DH.59		Not built	Design study for a transport biplane.
DH.60	Moth	22 February 1925	Two-seat light biplane
DH.60G	Gipsy Moth	1927	DH.60 Moth powered by de Havilland Gipsy engine
DH.60GIII	Moth Major	1929	DH.60 Moth powered by new Gipsy III/Gipsy Major engine
DH.61	Giant Moth	December 1927	Eight-passenger biplane airliner
DH.62		Not built	Eight-passenger biplane airliner with two Siddeley Puma engines. Crew of two in open cockpit in the nose.
DH.63		Not built	Scaled-down four-passenger version of DH.61 with a Siddeley Puma engine.
DH.64		Not built	Enlarged version of DH.62 for 14 passengers with two Armstrong Siddeley Jaguar radial engines.
DH.65	Hound	17 November 1926	Day bomber biplane
DH.66	Hercules	30 September 1926	3-engined biplane airliner, 14 passengers
DH.67	Gloster Survey	1929	Twin-engined photo survey biplane built by Gloster.
DH.68		Not built	Executive version of DH.67 for six passengers and powered by two Armstrong Siddeley Jaguar engines. Cabin featured a toilet.
DH.69		Not built	High performance two-seat day bomber to an Air Ministry specification. Similar to the DH.65A but powered by a Rolls-Royce Falcon engine. Pilot in an open cockpit while the observer was in a prone bombing position on the fuselage floor.
DH.70		Not built	Army co-operation biplane for Australia.
DH.71	Tiger Moth	July 1927	High-speed monoplane, private venture
DH.72	de Havilland DH.72	28 July 1931	3-engined night bomber based on DH.66 and designed to Specification B.22/27
DH.73		Not built	High-altitude survey version of the DH.67 with two ADC Nimbus engines. Cockpit was offered in several layouts in tandem or side-by side configurations; aircraft could also be adapted as a seaplane.
DH.74		Not built	Light commercial four-seat transport based on the DH.65 and intended as DH.50 replacement.
DH.75	Hawk Moth	7 December 1928	Six-seat cabin monoplane
DH.76		Not built	20-passenger airliner with three Bristol Jupiter engines. Intended as DH.66 replacement.
DH.77	de Havilland DH.77	11 July 1929	Single-seat interceptor. Private venture designed to Specification F.20/27
DH.78		Not built	Two alternative designs for multi-engine airliners.
DH.79		Not built	Design study for a multi-engined transport.
DH.80	Puss Moth	9 September 1929	Three-seat touring monoplane, high-wing
DH.81	Swallow Moth	21 August 1931	Two-seat sporting monoplane
DH.82	Tiger Moth	26 October 1931	Two-seat primary trainer
DH.83	Fox Moth	29 January 1932	Small passenger biplane
DH.84	Dragon	24 November 1932	Large biplane airliner
DH.85	Leopard Moth	27 May 1933	Three-seat cabin monoplane
DH.86	Express	14 January 1934	Four-engine airliner based on DH.84 Dragon
DH.87	Hornet Moth	9 May 1934	Light biplane
DH.88	Comet	8 September 1934	Twin-engine racing monoplane
DH.89	Dragon Rapide	17 April 1934	Twin-engine airliner
DH.90	Dragonfly	12 August 1935	Twin-engine biplane, five seats
DH.91	Albatross	20 May 1937	Four-engine airliner, 22 passengers
DH.92	Dolphin	9 September 1936	Twin-engine airliner, designed to replace DH.89 Dragon Rapide
DH.93	Don	18 June 1937	Liaison aircraft
DH.94	Moth Minor	22 June 1937	Primary trainer, designed to replace Moth
DH.95	Flamingo	22 December 1938	Twin-engine transport
DH.96		Not built	Primary monoplane trainer to Specification T.1/37, powered by a Gipsy Queen I engine. Two crew in open tandem cockpits, front windshield frame was strong enough to protect crew in case of a nose-over on landing. Fixed landing gear with streamlined fairings.
DH.97		Not built	8-seat, three-engine monoplane airliner; construction was similar to the DH.91. Not proceeded with due to outbreak of WWII.
DH.98	Mosquito	25 November 1940	Twin-engine fighter and bomber
DH.99		Not built	Original all-metal proposal for a twin-boom jet fighter which, in composite wood-and-metal form, became the DH.100. Design study for a Napier Sabre-powered twin-engine fast bomber derivative, developed into DH.101 concept. Number later allocated to a light single-engine civil biplane intended as DH.87 replacement. This was abandoned due to WWII.
DH.100	Vampire, (known as Spider Crab until April 1944).	29 September 1943	Twin-boom jet fighter
DH.101		Not built	High speed, high-altitude unarmed night intruder with Napier Sabre engines to Specification B.11/41 and based on the Mosquito. Despite priority over the Vampire jet fighter, a shortage of Sabre engines resulted in the DH.101's abandonment in April 1942 in favor of the lower-powered DH.102.
DH.102		Not built	Night bomber to Specification B.4/42, with two Rolls-Royce Merlin or Griffon engines. Designed to carry a 5000 lb bomb load at lower speed than the Mosquito. Officially approved in April 1942 as the Mosquito Series II, but work was stopped in late 1942.
DH.103	Hornet and Sea Hornet	28 July 1944	Twin-engine fighter
DH.104	Dove and Devon	25 September 1945	8-passenger airliner, military transport and communications
DH.105		Not built	Three-seat primary trainer with fixed landing gear to Specification T.23/43. Production contract won by the Percival Prentice.
DH.106	Comet	27 July 1949	Jet airliner
DH.107		Not built	Proposed development of the Vampire that eventually became the Venom.
DH.108	de Havilland DH 108 "Swallow"	15 May 1946	Swept wing experimental aircraft
DH.109		Not built	Design study for a four-engine airliner. Designation also possibly used for a naval strike aircraft to Specification N.8/49.
DH.110	Sea Vixen	26 September 1951	Two-seat naval fighter
DH.111		Not built	Jet bomber based on Comet I to Specification B.35/46 proposed in May 1948. Despite not meeting the Specification, it represented the most advanced aircraft that could be produced with a certainty of success within a reasonable time scale. The Comet's wing and engines and tailplane were fitted to a thinner fuselage that could carry a single 10000 lb bomb or eighteen 1000 lb bombs and a crew of four. Pilot located under a bubble canopy offset to the left with the copilot on the right side and two radar navigators/bomb aimers behind the pilot facing to the rear.
DH.112	Venom	2 September 1949	Jet fighter
DH.113	Vampire NF.10		Night fighter variant
DH.114	Heron	10 May 1950	Small airliner development of Dove
DH.115	Vampire, T.11 and export variants		two seat trainer variant
DH.116		Not built	Naval jet fighter to Specification N.114 powered by a Rolls-Royce RA.14 Avon jet engine with an estimated maximum speed of Mach 1.0 in level flight. Cockpit and fuselage were based on the Sea Venom with a new thin-section swept-back wing. Dropped in favor of the DH.110.
DH.117		Not built	Submission to F.155T, designed with straight wing and to be powered by two de Havilland Gyron Junior turbojets and one de Havilland Spectre rocket.
DH.118		Not built	Long-haul jet transport powered by four Rolls-Royce Conway jet engines. carry 120 passengers on transatlantic and similar long-distance routes. Larger than the Comet 4 but smaller than the Boeing 707, the DH.118 promised improved speed and increased range. Announced in the House of Commons on 24 October 1956, the aircraft was planned to commence operations in February 1962, but was abandoned in February 1957 in favor of the Vickers VC10.
DH.119		Not built	Jet airliner similar to the DH.118, High-speed short to medium range high-capacity airliner. Projected in 1956–1957, the DH.119 was based on Comet and DH.118 experience and intended to fulfill a BEA requirement. The aircraft sat 95 passengers over lengths of 1250 mi. Wings and tail surfaces were swept back 35° with four Rolls-Royce Avon jet engines mounted in pairs under the wing trailing edge.
DH.120		Not built	Jet airliner similar to the DH.119, but to meet both BEA and BOAC requirements.
DH.121	Hawker Siddeley Trident	9 January 1962	Three-engine jet airliner
DH.122		Not built	Proposed Trident variant to compete with the Vickers VC10. Number also used for an executive aircraft project at Christchurch powered by two Gnome engines to complement the DH.123.
DH.123		Not built	Feederliner intended as a Dakota replacement. Powered by two de Havilland Gnome turboprops with a high-wing layout and a maximum capacity of 40 passengers or a payload of 7800 lb. Designed for economic operations over very short routes (e.g. 200 mi), but with a full fuel load and payload reduced to 2400 lb, the range could be extended to 1610 mi. Abandoned due to competition with the HS.748 when de Havilland joined Hawker Siddeley. de Havilland turned to the DH.126 instead.
DH.124			A series of design studies for a twin-engine jet airliner with BS.75 engines on the rear fuselage and a high-swept tail. The aircraft would seat 48 passengers with room forward for cargo. Similar in size to the Hunting H.107 project.
DH.125	British Aerospace 125 initially "Jet Dragon"	13 August 1962	Medium corporate jet
DH.126		Not built	Twin jet-engine feederliner similar to the DH.125 but seating 26-32 passengers. Design put forward in May 1960, powered by two engines of 3500-4200 lb thrust range. Engines considered were the Rolls-Royce RB.173, de Havilland BS.92 and GE CF-700.
DH.127		Not built	Proposed delta-winged strike fighter for Royal Navy as Blackburn Buccaneer replacement, early 1960s. Design featured two Rolls-Royce Spey engines with vectored thrust and two Rolls-Royce RB.108 lift jets in the nose to lower approach speed. Designation chosen to avoid confusion with the Hawker P.1127 that was later designated DH.128.

== See also ==
- de Havilland Moth
