= De Havilland Moth =

Light utility aircraft

The de Havilland Moths were a series of light aircraft, sports planes, and military trainers designed by Geoffrey de Havilland. In the late 1920s and 1930s, they were the most common civilian aircraft flying in Britain, and during that time every light aircraft flying in the UK was commonly referred to as a Moth, regardless if it was de Havilland-built or not.

== Development and models ==
The first Moth was the DH.60 - a straight-winged biplane two-seater. To enable storing the plane in small spaces, the DH.60's wings could fold backwards against the fuselage. "Like a moth" remarked Geoffrey de Havilland, an avid lepidopterist, so the plane was nicknamed Moth from the drawing board on.

The Moth was one of the first practical light aircraft designs to be intended for civilian training and recreational use, rather than for military buyers. The Moth was also one of the first light aircraft to be mass produced, and was available to a much wider section of the general public than previous aircraft designs.

First variations of the name began with changes in the engine used for the DH.60: Variants with a Cirrus Hermes, Armstrong Siddeley Genet, or de Havilland Gipsy engine became "Hermes Moth", "Genet Moth", or "Gipsy Moth", respectively. The original ADC Cirrus-powered DH.60 retroactively became the "Cirrus Moth". As the DH.60 became more and more popular, de Havilland decided to cash in on the fame of the original by giving each of his new designs a name ending with Moth.

First of them was the DH.61, a giant, single-engined, five-passenger biplane aptly called "Giant Moth". Other Moths include the Leopard Moth and Hornet Moth cabin biplanes, the Puss Moth cabin monoplane and the Moth Minor low-wing two-seater. The most famous of the Moths, however, for sheer numbers built (nearly 9,000), is the DH.82 Tiger Moth - a biplane trainer used during the Second World War in Britain and the Commonwealth of Nations, and the aircraft in which all Second World War RAF pilots learned to fly.

== Variations ==
de Havilland "Moth" aircraft
Name	Number	Notes	Produced	Named after
Moth, Gipsy Moth and Moth Major	DH.60	biplane	some	Lymantria dispar
Giant Moth	DH.61	biplane, 8 passengers	10	
Tiger Moth Racer	DH.71	monoplane	2	some of the Arctiinae
Hawk Moth	DH.75	monoplane, 4 seats	8	some of the Sphingidae
Puss Moth	DH.80A	monoplane	284	Megalopyge opercularis or Cerura vinula
Swallow Moth	DH.81	monoplane	1	
Tiger Moth	DH.82	biplane	8,868	some of the Arctiinae
Fox Moth	DH.83	biplane	154	Macrothylacia rubi
Leopard Moth	DH.85	monoplane	133	Zeuzera pyrina or Hypercompe scribonia
Hornet Moth	DH.87	biplane	164	Sesia apiformis
Moth Minor	DH.94	monoplane	about 140	

The prototype of the DH.84 Dragon light passenger plane was originally called "Dragon Moth", but later the "moth" in its name was dropped as the plane was a civilian airliner and the name moth was to be used for sports planes only.

== 1979 Rally ==
In June 1979 a rally of 63 De Havilland planes (mainly Tiger Moths) undertook a staged race from the De Havilland aerodrome at Hatfield to Strathallan airfield in Perthshire over three consecutive days. The rally marked the 50th anniversary of the Gypsy Engine Reliability Tour in 1929. Titled the "DH MOTH AIR RALLY" it was sponsored by the Famous Grouse. Planes reached Strathallan on Saturday 30 June 1979 and there was an aerobatic display open to the public on the following day.
