= De Havilland T.K.1 =

T.K.1
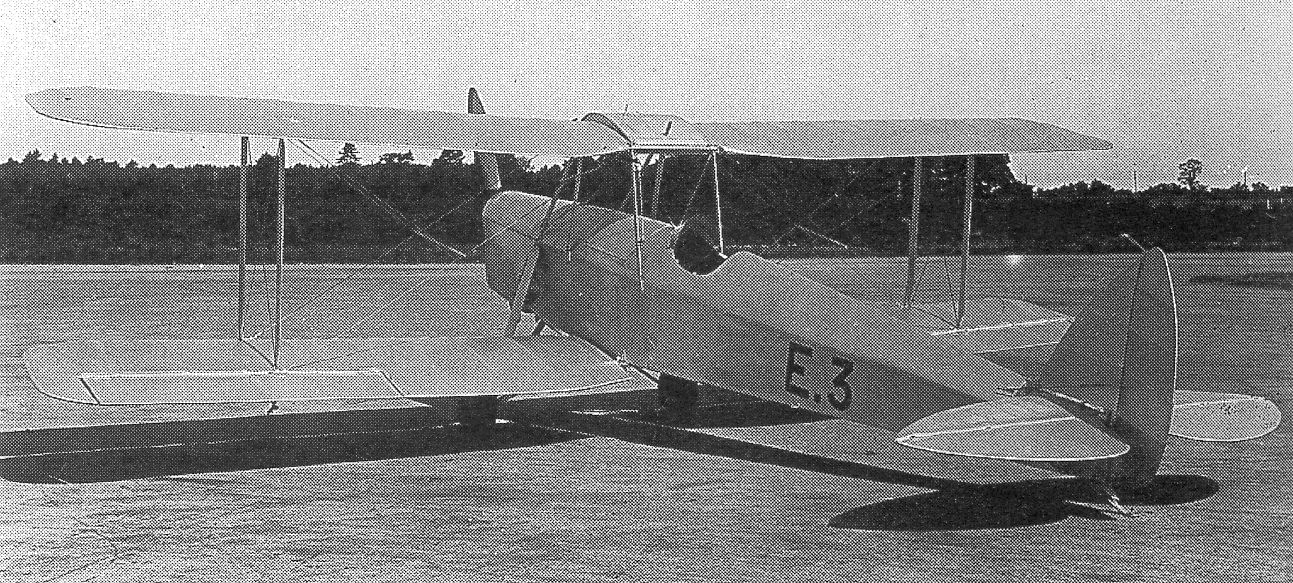

General information
- Type: Two-seat biplane
- National origin: United Kingdom
- Manufacturer: de Havilland Technical School
- Number built: 1

History
- First flight: 1934
- Retired: 1936

The de Havilland T.K.1 was a 1930s British two-seat biplane and the first design built by students of the de Havilland Technical School.

== Design and development ==
The T.K.1 was built by students under the direction of Marcus Langley at Stag Lane Aerodrome in 1934, based on converting the de Havilland Swallow Moth monoplane to a biplane. It was a conventional two-seat biplane powered by a 120 hp (89 kW) de Havilland Gipsy III and first flown in June 1934. It was flown by Geoffrey de Havilland to 5th place in the 1934 King's Cup air race with a speed of 124.4 mph. It was sold onto a private owner in 1936 who flew it for as short time as a single-seater before it was scrapped.

== Specifications ==
Data from Jackson.

General characteristics

- Crew: 2
- Length: 24 ft 0 in (7.32 m)
- Wingspan: 27 ft 0 in (8.23 m)
- Empty weight: 950 lb (431 kg)
- Gross weight: 1,450 lb (658 kg)
- Powerplant: 1 × de Havilland Gipsy III , 120 hp (90 kW)

Performance

- Maximum speed: 118 mph (189 km/h, 103 kn)
- Cruise speed: 100 mph (160 km/h, 87 kn)
