= Tasmanian Airways =

Airline in Tasmania, Australia

Tasmanian Airways Pty. Ltd. was a Hobart, Tasmania-based company registered on 10 December 1926 with the intention of operating aerial services between Tasmania and Victoria.

== History ==
Its main proprietor was F. F. De Mey, who was also the proprietor of Tasmanian Motor Service Co. Pty. Ltd. and President of the Commercial Motor Users Association of Tasmania. Two years later, it proposed opening a Bass Strait service using a three-engine floatplane (possibly an Avro 618 Ten). However, it failed to attract sufficient capital. In 1929, it chartered a De Havilland Gipsy Moth for a promotional flight from Adelaide to Brisbane. Early in 1934, it acquired a De Havilland Hawk Moth VH-UNW from the Hart Aircraft Service renaming it City of Hobart. Initially used for joy flights out of Brighton, Tasmania, the aircraft began operating a regular passenger service between Brighton and Launceston, Tasmania in August 1934, connecting with Tasmanian Aerial Service's Launceston-Bass Strait Islands-Melbourne services. These services ceased on 10 January 1935, after a piston-rod failure damaged City of Hobart 's engine beyond repair and resulted in a forced landing at Brighton. The engineless aircraft was sold in mid-1936, and the company was later liquidated.

== Fleet ==
- Avro 618 Ten
- De Havilland Gipsy Moth
- De Havilland Hawk Moth

== See also ==
- List of defunct airlines of Australia
- Aviation in Australia
