= De Havilland Hawk Moth =

DH.75 Hawk Moth
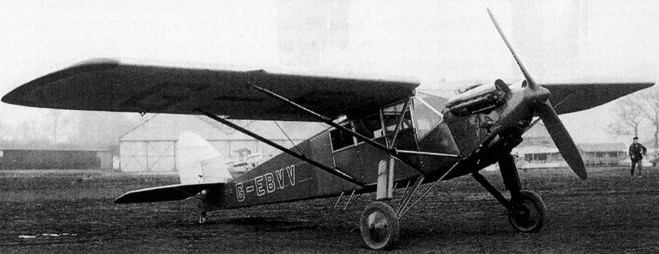

General information
- Type: Cabin monoplane
- Manufacturer: de Havilland
- Number built: 8

History
- First flight: 7 December 1928

The de Havilland DH.75 Hawk Moth was a 1920s British four-seat cabin monoplane built by de Havilland at Stag Lane Aerodrome, Edgware, in London.

== Design and development ==
The DH.75 Hawk Moth was the first of a family of high-wing monoplane Moths, and was designed as a light transport or air-taxi for export. The aircraft had a fabric-covered steel-tube fuselage and wooden wings. The Hawk Moth was first flown on 7 December 1928 from Stag Lane. The first aircraft used a 200 hp (149 kW) de Havilland Ghost engine. This engine comprised two de Havilland Gipsys mounted on a common crankcase to form an air-cooled V-8. With the Ghost, the aircraft was underpowered and a 310 hp (230 kW) Armstrong Siddeley Cheetah 7-cylinder radial engine was fitted to it and all but one production aircraft. Changes were also made to the structure including increased span and chord wings and the aircraft was redesignated the DH.75A.

In December 1929 the first aircraft was demonstrated in Canada with both wheel and ski undercarriage. Following trials with the second aircraft on floats, the Canadian government ordered three aircraft for civil use. The first Canadian aircraft (actually the first Hawk Moth) did not have doors on the port side and could therefore not be used as a floatplane, so it was used by the Controller of Civil Aircraft. Further tests were carried out by de Havilland Canada in 1930, and the second and third aircraft were cleared to use floats. With restrictions on payload when fitted with floats the Canadian aircraft were used only on skis or wheels. In an attempt to compete with American-designed aircraft, the eighth aircraft was produced as the DH.75B with a 300 hp (224 kW) Wright Whirlwind engine. Production was stopped and two aircraft were not completed.

== Operational service ==
With three aircraft operating in Canada, a further two were exported to Australia. One of the Australian aircraft, VH-UNW ex G-AAFX, was used by Amy Johnson to fly from Brisbane to Sydney in 1930 when her De Havilland Moth Jason was damaged. Major De Havilland later flew Miss Johnson to Perth in the aircraft, from where she returned to Britain by ship. VH-UNW was later sold to Hart Aircraft Service of Melbourne, who used it mainly for joy flights.

In February 1934 it was sold to Tasmanian Airways as the City of Hobart to run between Brighton, Tasmania and Launceston, Tasmania. It made a forced landing at Brighton on 10 January 1935 after a piston-rod failure, with the engine being beyond repair. In mid-1936 the engine-less airframe was sold to G. H. "Harry" Purvis, who refitted it with a Wright Whirlwind engine and used it to conduct joy flights in New South Wales. It last flew for Connellan Airways of Alice Springs. It was withdrawn from service in 1949.

== Variants ==
DH.75
Prototype with de Havilland Ghost V8 engine; one built, later re-engined.
DH.75A
Production version with Armstrong Siddeley Lynx VIA radial piston engine; six built.
DH.75B
Final production aircraft fitted with a 300 hp (224 kW) Wright R-975 Whirlwind radial engine; one built. DH.75A VH-UNW retrofitted to this standard in 1936.

== Operators ==
Australia

- Royal Australian Air Force

Canada

- Royal Canadian Air Force

United Kingdom

- Royal Air Force

== Specifications (D.H.75A (Landplane)) ==
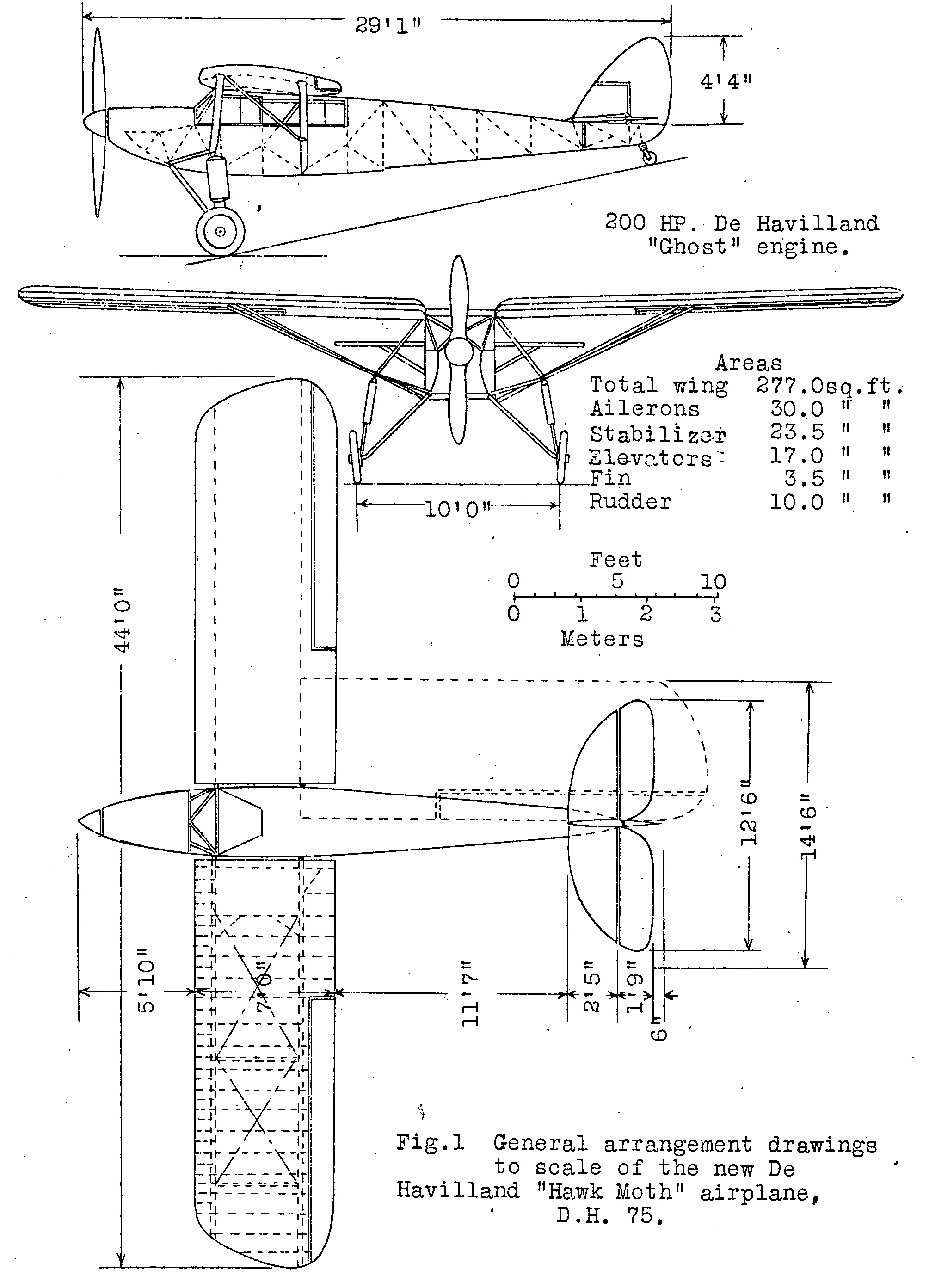
De Havilland DH.75 3-view drawing from NACA Aircraft Circular No.91

Data from De Havilland Aircraft since 1909

General characteristics

- Crew: One
- Capacity: Three passengers
- Length: 28 ft 10 in (8.79 m)
- Wingspan: 47 ft 0 in (14.33 m)
- Height: 9 ft 4 in (2.84 m)
- Wing area: 334 sq ft (31.0 m^{2})
- Empty weight: 2,380 lb (1,080 kg)
- Max takeoff weight: 3,650 lb (1,656 kg)
- Powerplant: 1 × Armstrong Siddeley Lynx VIA radial engine, 240 hp (180 kW)

Performance

- Maximum speed: 127 mph (204 km/h, 110 kn)
- Cruise speed: 105 mph (169 km/h, 91 kn)
- Range: 560 mi (900 km, 490 nmi)
- Service ceiling: 14,500 ft (4,400 m)
- Rate of climb: 710 ft/min (3.6 m/s)

== See also ==
- List of de Havilland aircraft
