= Cierva C.24 =

C.24
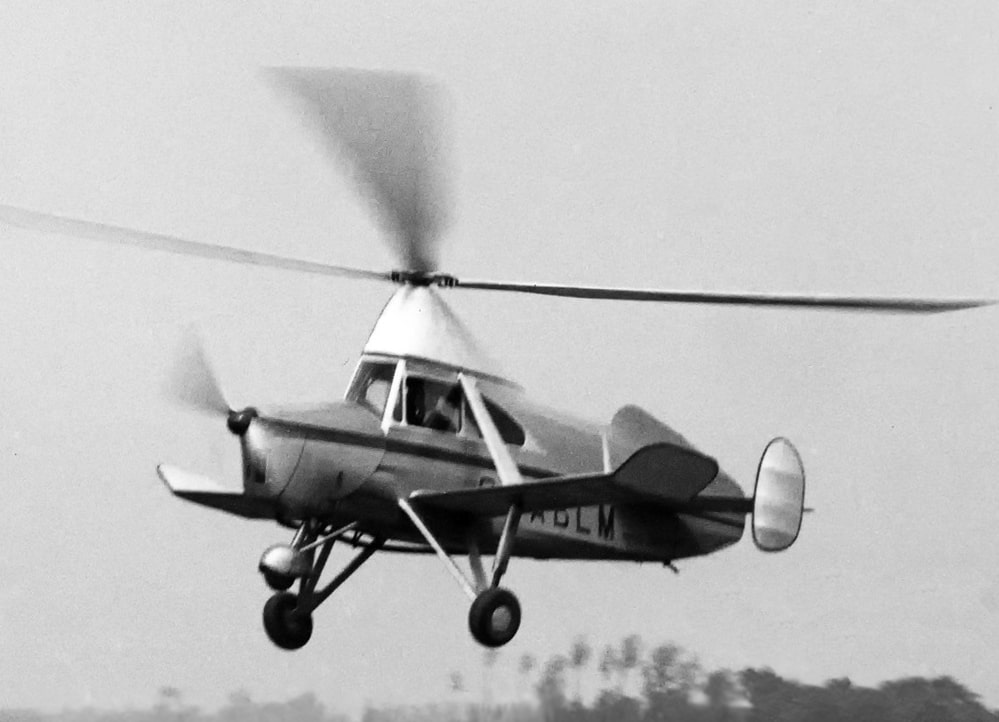
- de Havilland C.24 in flight

General information
- Type: Utility autogyro
- Manufacturer: de Havilland
- Designer: Juan de la Cierva
- Status: Museum exhibit
- Number built: 1

History
- Manufactured: 1931
- First flight: September 1931

The de Havilland C.24 was a two-seat autogyro built by de Havilland at its Stag Lane works in England in 1931

C.24 in flight

== Design and development ==
The C.24 was built in 1931 using a Cierva rotor head coupled to the cabin of a de Havilland DH.80A Puss Moth, and driven by a 120 hp Gipsy III engine. It was withdrawn from use by December 1934.

A single example (G-ABLM) was produced and is part of the Science Museum collection. In 1932, it was redesignated C.26 (not to be confused with the unbuilt C.26 twin-engine autogiro design) when a two-blade rotor system was installed. Since 2008 it has been on loan to the de Havilland Aircraft Museum at Salisbury Hall, near London Colney in Hertfordshire. In flight, it had a maximum speed of about 115 mph (185 km/h; 100 kn).

== Specifications ==
Data from Jackson 1978 p.524

General characteristics

- Crew: 2
- Length: 20 ft 0 in (6.10 m)
- Empty weight: 1,280 lb (955 kg)
- Gross weight: 1,800 lb (1,343 kg)
- Powerplant: 1 × de Havilland Gipsy III 4-cylinder inverted air-cooled inline , 120 hp (90 kW)
- Main rotor diameter: 34 ft 0 in (10.36 m)

Performance

- Maximum speed: 115 mph (185 km/h, 100 kn)
- Cruise speed: 100 mph (164 km/h, 87 kn)
- Range: 350 mi (563 km, 300 nmi)
