= De Havilland Moth Minor =

Type of aircraft

DH.94 Moth Minor
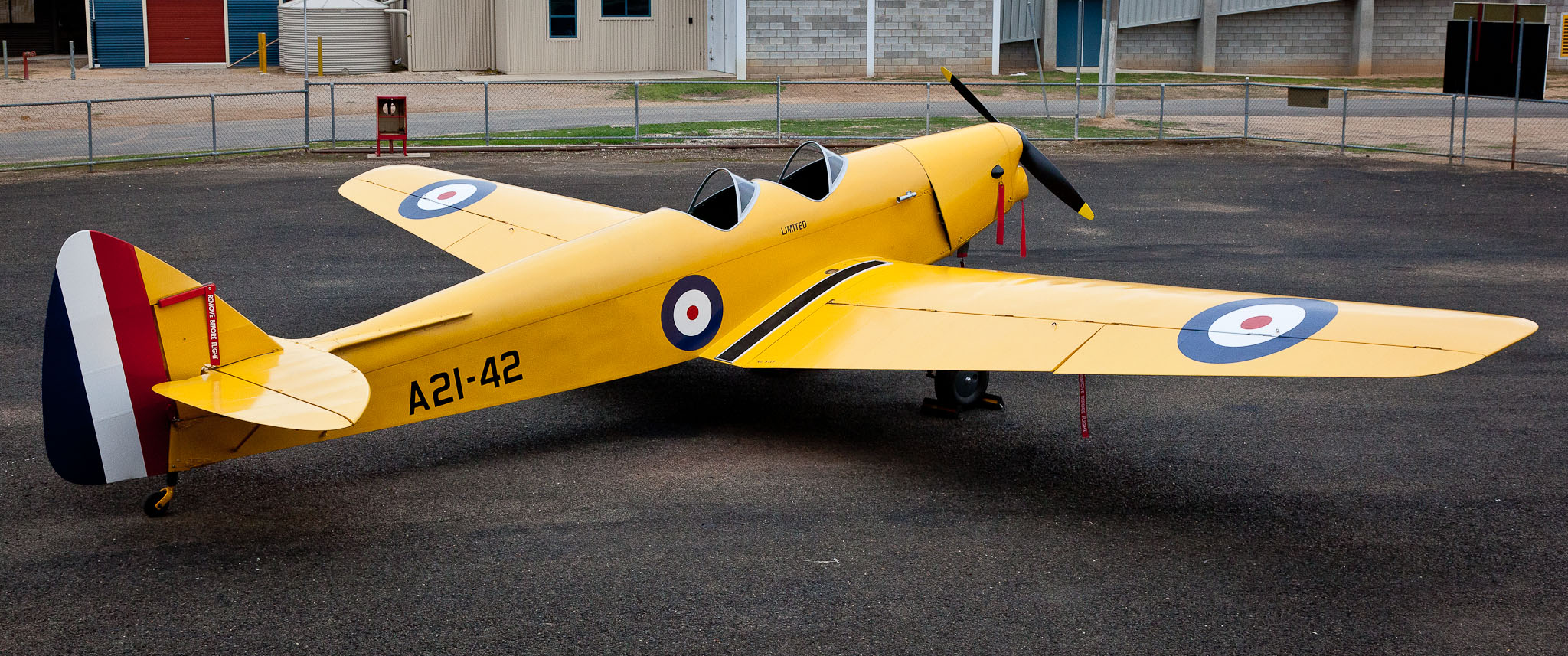
- An ex-RAAF DH.94 Moth Minor at the Benalla Aviation Museum in June 2012

General information
- Type: Tourer/Trainer
- National origin: United Kingdom
- Manufacturer: de Havilland
- Designer: J.P. Smith
- Number built: c.140

History
- First flight: 22 June 1937

The de Havilland DH.94 Moth Minor was a 1930s British two-seat tourer/trainer aircraft built by de Havilland at Hatfield Aerodrome, England. With the start of the Second World War, production of the Moth Minor was moved to de Havilland Australia at Bankstown Aerodrome, Australia.

== Design and development ==
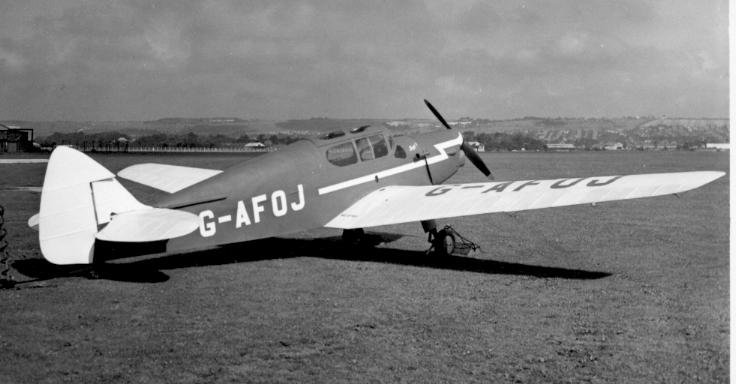
DH.94 Moth Minor Coupe at Portsmouth Airport in September 1954

The Moth Minor was designed as a low-wing monoplane to replace the biplane Moth series, and was intended to give similar performance with less power, and without the need for rigging of the biplane's tensioners and struts. Its predecessor was the DH.81 Swallow Moth monoplane of 1931, of which only one was built. The wooden prototype of the DH.94 was first flown by Geoffrey de Havilland on 22 June 1937 at Hatfield Aerodrome. Production started and nearly 100 examples had been built by the outbreak of the Second World War. With a selling price of only £575 the Moth Minor was popular with flying clubs keen to acquire modern monoplanes. Nine aircraft were specially built with hinged coupe tops instead of the normally open cockpit.

As the factory at Hatfield was needed for the war effort, the drawings, jigs, components and unfinished aircraft were shipped to the de Havilland factory at Bankstown, Sydney. More than 40 aircraft were produced in Australia.

Civil aircraft operated in the United Kingdom were commandeered for use by the Royal Air Force and Fleet Air Arm, and one example was used by the United States Army Air Corps. A large number of civil aircraft from the UK were sent to Australia, where they and a handful of locally built Australian civil aircraft were commandeered by the Royal Australian Air Force.

After the Second World War several Moth Minors continued to be flown by private owners in the United Kingdom.

During World War two, de Havilland took over the small grass airfield at Witney in Oxfordshire where they operated as a Civilian Repair Organisation on behalf of the British Government. They carried out complete overhauls to battle-damaged Spitfires and Hurricanes, plus any de Havilland types. An ex-Battle of Britain RAF pilot had been posted in to Witney to carry out the test flights as the aircraft were completed by the factory but he was de-mobbed as the war drew to an end, and test-flights carried out by de Havilland pilots who flew down to Witney from Hatfield.

An experimental variant with a tricycle landing gear and canopy over the rear seat was first flown on 29 April 1940.

== Variants ==
- DH.94 Moth Minor : Two-seat touring and training aircraft.
- Moth Minor Coupe : Two-seat touring and training aircraft, with a built-up rear fuselage and hinged cabin top.

== Operators ==
=== Military operators ===
Australia

- Royal Australian Air Force

India

- Royal Indian Air Force

New Zealand

- Royal New Zealand Air Force
  - No. 2 Squadron RNZAF
  - No. 20 Squadron RNZAF
  - No. 21 Squadron RNZAF
  - No. 22 Squadron RNZAF

South Africa

- South African Air Force

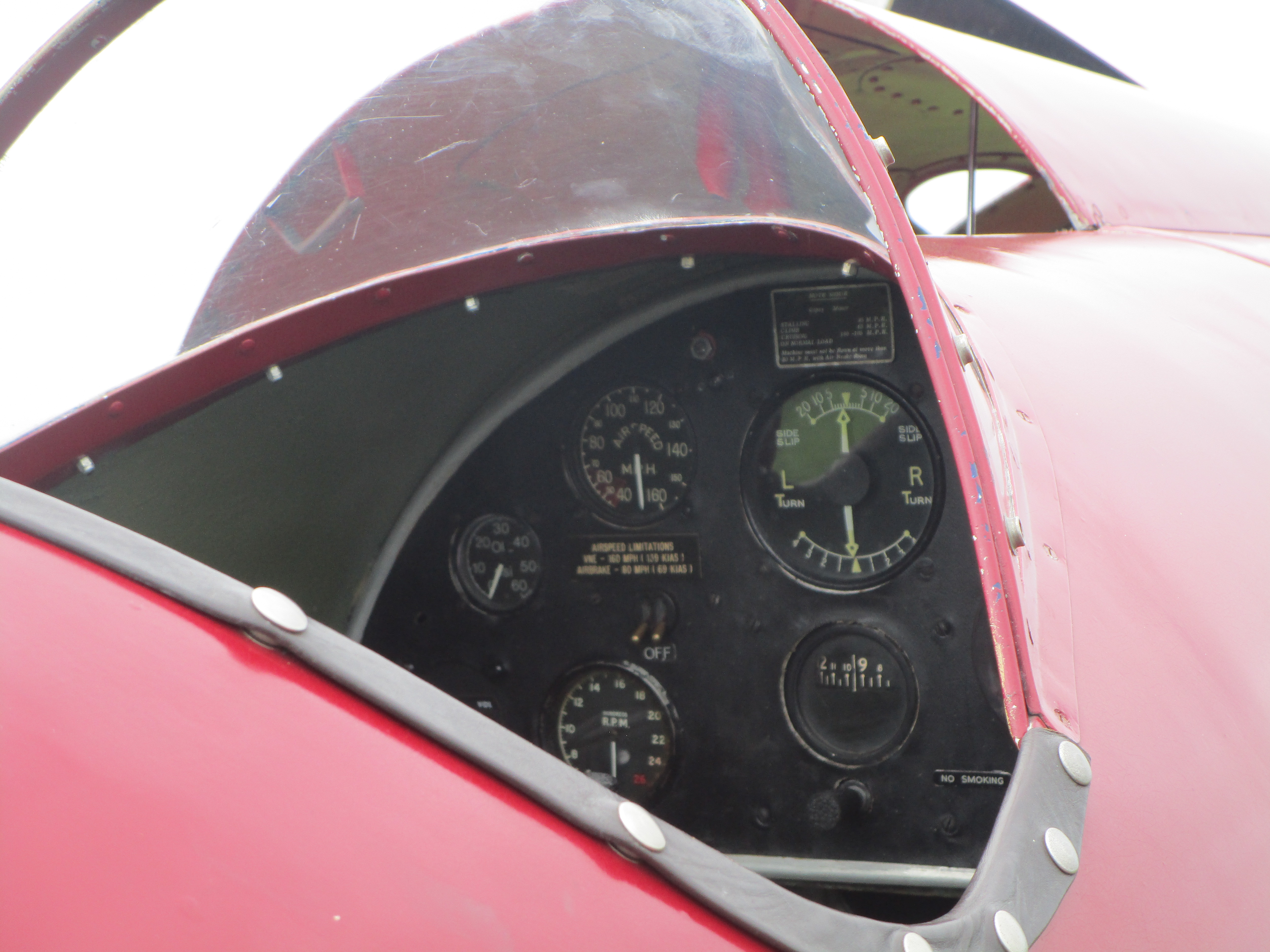
The De Havilland Moth Minor featured very simple instrumentation which was helpful when training new pilots

United Kingdom

- Royal Air Force
- Royal Navy Fleet Air Arm

United States

- United States Army Air Corps

== Surviving aircraft ==
A number of Moth Minors have survived, including:

=== Australia ===
- VH-AAM C/N 94002, dismantled remains stored in Albury, New South Wales, as a possible restoration project.
- VH-AGO ex RAAF A21-14 ex G-AFOR C/N 9404, still airworthy, owned by Charles Camilleri, New South Wales, Australia.
- VH-AIB ex RAAF A21-38 C/N DHP17, still airworthy, owned by Steve Jenkins and located at Goolwa, South Australia.
- VH-CZB ex RAAF A21-42 C/N 94067, still airworthy, owned by Mark Carr and located at the Benalla Aviation Museum, Vic.
- VH-THT ex RAAF A21-12 C/N 94076, preserved and on display at the Royal Australian Air Force Association of Western Australia's Aviation Heritage Museum, Bull Creek, Perth, Western Australia.

=== New Zealand ===
- ZK-AKM ex RNZAF NZ597 ex ZK-AHK ex G-AFON C/N 94012, airworthy, owned by Stan Smith of Albany, Auckland.

=== United States ===
- N94DH ex HB-OMU C/N 94020, currently stored with the Commemorative Air Force, previously operated by the Rio Grande Valley Wing and painted in spurious RAF markings. In 2016, the CAF listed N94DH as a restoration candidate available for reassignment to another wing.
- N9403 ex ZK-BFP ex G-AFRR ex RAF HM579 ex G-AFRR C/N 9403, airworthy with Magerko Management LLC at Bandel Airport, Glyde, Pennsylvania.

=== United Kingdom ===
- G-AFOB C/N 94018, stored
- G-AFOJ C/N 9407, Coupe model,
- G-AFPN C/N 94016, airworthy.
- G-AFNG C/N 94014, Coupe model, stored awaiting restoration to airworthy with John S Shaw Aviation.
- G-AFRR ex-ZK-BFP C/N 9403, believed airworthy.

== Specifications ==
Data from British Civil Aircraft since 1919, Vol 2

General characteristics

- Crew: 2
- Length: 24 ft 5 in (7.44 m)
- Wingspan: 36 ft 7 in (11.15 m)
- Height: 6 ft 4 in (1.93 m)
- Wing area: 162 sq ft (15.1 m^{2})
- Airfoil: RAF34 modified
- Empty weight: 983 lb (446 kg)
- Max takeoff weight: 1,550 lb (703 kg)
- Powerplant: 1 × de Havilland Gipsy Minor 4-cylinder inverted air-cooled in-line piston engine, 90 hp (67 kW)
- Propellers: 2-bladed fixed-pitch wooden propeller

Performance

- Maximum speed: 118 mph (190 km/h, 103 kn)
- Cruise speed: 100 mph (160 km/h, 87 kn)
- Range: 300 mi (480 km, 260 nmi)
- Service ceiling: 16,500 ft (5,000 m)
- Rate of climb: 620 ft/min (3.1 m/s)
- Wing loading: 9.57 lb/sq ft (46.7 kg/m^{2})
- Power/mass: 0.58 hp/lb (0.95 kW/kg)

== See also ==
Aircraft of comparable role, configuration, and era

- British Aircraft Swallow
- Klemm Kl 35
- Miles M.2 Hawk Trainer
- RWD 23
- Yakovlev UT-2

Related lists

- List of aircraft of the Royal Air Force
- List of aircraft of the Royal Australian Air Force
- List of aircraft of the Royal New Zealand Air Force and Royal New Zealand Navy
