= De Havilland Dolphin =

1930s British prototype light biplane

DH.92 Dolphin

General information
- Type: Twin-engined biplane airliner
- National origin: United Kingdom
- Manufacturer: de Havilland
- Status: Scrapped
- Number built: 1

History
- First flight: 1936
- Retired: 1936

The de Havilland DH.92 Dolphin was a 1930s British prototype light biplane airliner designed and built by the de Havilland aircraft company.

== Design and development ==
The Dolphin was designed as a modernised version of the de Havilland Dragon Rapide, incorporating ideas from the company's DH 86A and de Havilland Dragonfly but using new main assembly designs. It had a DH 86A-style nose to accommodate two crew side by side and increased span wings of unequal span, Dragonfly-like. It first appeared with the trousered undercarriage of these earlier biplane transports, but a retractable landing gear, rather like that of the DH.88 Comet was fitted before flight. Onboard air-stairs were one of the passenger access novelties. It was powered by two 204 hp (152 kW) de Havilland Gipsy Six piston engines. Fuel tanks were in the wings, as in the Dragonfly, to avoid the fire hazard of the Rapide's engine nacelle tanks.

One prototype was built and first flown on 9 September 1936. Geoffrey de Havilland's log shows that he flew it only once more. No others were built as it proved to be too heavy structurally and the prototype was scrapped in December 1936.

In an edition of Flight magazine dated 10 September 1936, the decision to discontinue the type was published as follows:

The South Africa Race will be poorer by one entry, and a most interesting entry at that, for the De Havilland Company announces that the design of the - D.H. 92 is to be discontinued, and that this experimental type will not be put into production. It is stated the development of the four-engined Albatross, important contracts contributing to the expansion of the Royal Air Force, and other urgent activities impose a heavy load on certain sections of the Company's organisation, making it impossible to devote the personnel and time necessary for the early production of the Dolphin — the type-name chosen for the ninety-second De Havilland design. The manufacture and technical development of the Dragonfly, the Dragon Rapide, and the D.H.86A will, of course, be continued at any rate of output required to meet the demands air transport operators, and the development of new commercial types will follow the completion of the Albatross.

== Specifications ==
Data from

General characteristics

- Crew: 2
- Capacity: 8
- Length: 36 ft 0 in (10.97 m)
- Wingspan: 50 ft 6 in (15.39 m)
- Height: 10 ft 3 in (3.12 m)
- Wing area: 393 sq ft (36.5 m^{2})
- Gross weight: 6,600 lb (2,994 kg)
- Powerplant: 2 × de Havilland Gipsy Six Series II 6-cylinder inverted air-cooled engines , 204 hp (152 kW) each

Performance

- Maximum speed: 161 mph (258 km/h, 140 kn) (estimated)

== See also ==
Related development

- de Havilland Dragon Rapide

Related lists

- List of de Havilland aircraft
