= De Havilland Ghost (V8) =

1920s British piston aircraft engine

Ghost
- Type: Air-cooled V8 piston engine
- National origin: United Kingdom
- Manufacturer: de Havilland
- First run: 1928
- Major applications: de Havilland Hawk Moth
- Developed from: ADC Cirrus

The de Havilland Ghost was a British V8 aero engine that first ran in 1928.

== Design and development ==
Designed by Geoffrey de Havilland the 'Ghost' was developed from the ADC Cirrus aero engine by using two banks of four cylinders. This appeared at first to be a retrograde step as the Cirrus was itself developed from the Renault 80 hp V8 engine however with the improved Cirrus cylinders the Ghost developed over twice the power of the French engine for a lower weight. Another difference from the Renault was the use of a propeller reduction gear, the Ghost's sole known aircraft application was the prototype de Havilland Hawk Moth high-wing cabin monoplane.

== Specifications (Ghost) ==
=== General characteristics ===
- Type: Air-cooled, upright, 90-degree, V8 piston engine
- Bore: 4.5 in (114 mm)
- Stroke: 5.0 in (128 mm)
- Displacement: 498.56 cu in (8.17 L)
- Designer: Geoffrey de Havilland

=== Components ===
- Valvetrain: One inlet and one exhaust valve per cylinder
- Fuel system: Carburettor
- Fuel type: 74 octane petrol
- Cooling system: Air-cooled
- Reduction gear: Spur geared, right hand tractor

=== Performance ===
- Power output: 198 hp (148 kW)
- Compression ratio: 5:1

== See also ==
Related development

- ADC Cirrus

Related lists

- List of aircraft engines
