= Cierva C.26 =

Unbuilt 1931 design for an "autogyro-helicopter"

C.26

General information
- Type: Experimental autogyro
- National origin: UK
- Designer: Juan de la Cierva
- Status: Unbuilt design

The Cierva C.26 was a 1931 design for an unorthodox autogyro by Juan de la Cierva that was never built. Cierva described it as an "autogiro-helicopter", (Note: Cierva used the unconventional spelling "autogiro" for his creations) a term he had coined the previous year to describe an aircraft with the characteristics and advantages of both more familiar types.

The designation C.26 was possibly later applied to an unrelated Cierva design, a modified Cierva C.24, although aviation historian Peter W. Brooks considers this "unlikely".

== Design ==
The aircraft was to have fixed wings, with a Pobjoy R radial engine mounted on each. One of these engines was to be modified to reverse the direction of its drive shaft, so that the aircraft's propellers would counter-rotate. The starboard engine would also have driven the aircraft's rotor, with the rotor torque compensated by differential thrust from the two propellers, together with a small rudder in the propeller slipstream. The rotor would also be equipped with a 12-horsepower (8.9 kW) mechanical starter to pre-rotate it to 80–85% of its flight speed.

An unusual flight characteristic of the C.26 design was its way of climbing vertically and hovering. These flight modes, typical of helicopters, are ones that autogyros are not capable of with their unpowered rotors. The C.26, however, was designed to be able to fly like this with its fuselage oriented vertically, that is, with its nose pointing straight upwards and tail pointing straight down. Thrust for vertical climb and for hover would therefore be provided by the wing-mounted propellers. Cierva acknowledged that this would be an uncomfortable attitude for the pilot (and add complexity to the fuel system), but said that it would only be adopted for very short times. For example, vertical take-off could be used during take-off in the vicinity of high obstacles, and that more conventional climb attitudes could otherwise be used.

== Specifications (as designed) ==
Data from Brooks 1988, p.163–64

General characteristics

- Empty weight: 900 lb (408 kg)
- Gross weight: 1,200 lb (544 kg)
- Powerplant: 2 × Pobjoy R air-cooled, seven-cylinder, geared radial engine, 80 hp (60 kW) each
- Main rotor diameter: 34 ft (10 m)

Performance

- Maximum speed: 130 mph (210 km/h, 110 kn)

== Notes ==
=== Bibliography ===
- Bennett, J. A. J. (October 1961). "The Era of the Autogiro". Journal of the Royal Aeronautical Society. Vol. 65, no. 610. pp. 649–660.
- Brooks, Peter W. (1988). Cierva Autogiros: The Development of Rotary-Wing Flight. Washington D.C.: Smithsonian Institution.
- Cierva, Juan de la (November 1930). "The Autogiro". Journal of the Royal Aeronautical Society. Vol. 34, no. 239. pp. 902–921.
- The Illustrated Encyclopedia of Aircraft. London: Aerospace Publishing.
- Leishman, J. Gordon (2002). Principles of Helicopter Aerodynamics. Cambridge: Cambridge University Press.
- Venkatesan, C. (2014). Fundamentals of Helicopter Dynamics. Boca Raton FL: CRC.
