= De Havilland Hyena =

Prototype British army cooperation aircraft

DH.56 Hyena
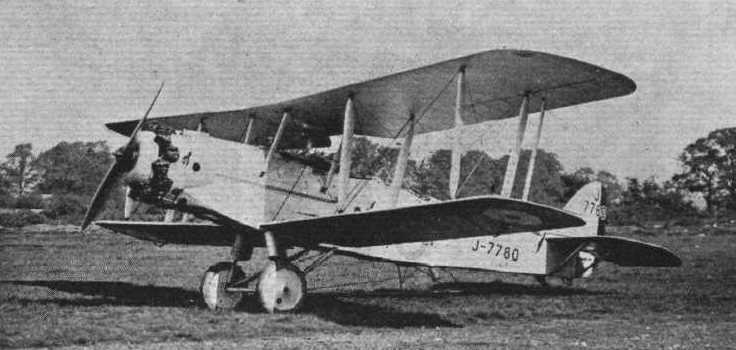
- The DH.56 Hyena J-7780

General information
- Type: Army cooperation aircraft
- National origin: United Kingdom
- Manufacturer: de Havilland
- Number built: 2

History
- First flight: 17 May 1925
- Developed from: de Havilland DH.42B Dingo II

The de Havilland DH.56 Hyena was a prototype British army cooperation aircraft of the 1920s. A single-engined biplane, the Hyena was designed against an RAF requirement, but was unsuccessful with only two being built, the Armstrong Whitworth Atlas being preferred.

== Development and design ==
The DH.56 Hyena was developed to meet the requirements of Air Ministry Specification 30/24 for an Army Cooperation aircraft to equip Britain's Royal Air Force. It was a development of de Havilland's earlier DH.42B Dingo, and like the Dingo, was a single-engined two-bay biplane carrying a crew of two. It was armed with a forward-firing Vickers machine gun and a Lewis gun operated by the observer. A hook to pick up messages was fitted beneath the fuselage, while the aircraft was also equipped for photography, artillery spotting, supply dropping and bombing.

The first Hyena flew on 17 May 1925, powered by a 385 hp (287 kW) Armstrong Siddeley Jaguar III radial engine. With this engine it was underpowered, and was quickly re-engined with a 422 hp (315 kW) Jaguar IV before it was submitted for official testing (which was against the requirements of Specification 20/25, which had superseded 30/24). The two prototype Hyenas were tested against the other competitors for the RAF's orders, the Armstrong Whitworth Atlas, the Bristol Bloodhound and the Vickers Vespa, including field evaluation with No. 4 Squadron RAF. Handling close to the ground was found to be difficult, with a poor view from the cockpit, and the orders went to the Atlas, with the Hyena being abandoned, being used for testing at the Royal Aircraft Establishment, Farnborough until 1928.

== Specifications (Jaguar IV) ==
Data from De Havilland Aircraft since 1909

General characteristics

- Crew: Two
- Length: 29 ft 9 in (9.07 m)
- Upper wingspan: 43 ft 0 in (13.11 m)
- Lower wingspan: 41 ft 5 1/4 in (12.630 m)
- Height: 10 ft 9 in (3.28 m)
- Wing area: 421 1/4 sq ft (39.14 m^{2})
- Empty weight: 2,399 lb (1,088 kg)
- Max takeoff weight: 4,200 lb (1,905 kg)
- Fuel capacity: 100 imp gal (120 US gal; 450 L)
- Powerplant: 1 × Armstrong Siddeley Jaguar IV 14-cylinder air-cooled radial engine, 422 hp (315 kW)

Performance

- Maximum speed: 130 mph (210 km/h, 110 kn)
- Service ceiling: 19,230 ft (5,860 m)
- Time to altitude: 13 min 24 s to 10,000 ft (3,000 m)

Armament

- Guns: 1 × forward firing .303 in (7.7 mm) Vickers machine gun and 1 × .303 in (7.7 mm) Lewis Gun on Scarff ring in rear cockpit
- Bombs: 4 × light bombs under port wing

== See also ==
Related development

- de Havilland Dingo

Aircraft of comparable role, configuration, and era

- Armstrong Whitworth Atlas
- Bristol Boarhound
- Vickers Vespa
