= De Havilland DH.71 Tiger Moth =

1927 British monoplane aircraft

DH.71 Tiger Moth
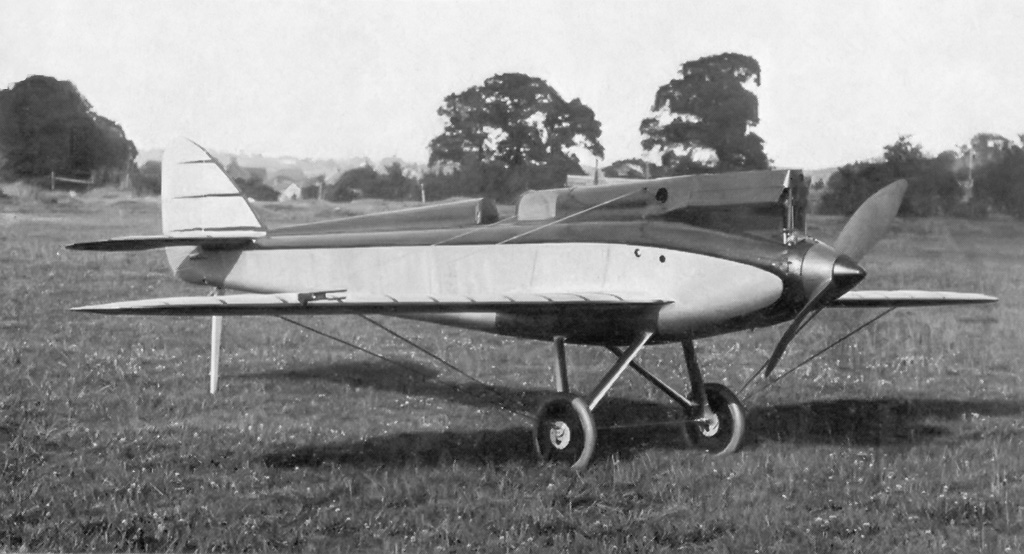
- The first prototype D.H.71 Tiger Moth G-EBQU

General information
- Type: high-speed research and racing monoplane
- National origin: United Kingdom
- Manufacturer: De Havilland Aircraft Company
- Number built: 2

History
- Introduction date: 1927
- First flight: 24 June 1927
- Retired: 1930

The de Havilland DH.71 Tiger Moth was a British single-seat monoplane, designed to research high-speed flight and to test replacement engines for the Cirrus. Only two were built.

== Design and development ==
It was a low-wing monoplane based on the earlier Moth biplanes with a stressed plywood covering and the cockpit designed around its test pilot, Hubert Broad, to make it as streamlined as possible: this resulted in the fuselage sides being sloped outwards to accommodate his shoulders. The Tiger Moth had a fixed conventional landing gear with a tail skid. The first aircraft built (registration G-EBQU) first flew from Stag Lane Aerodrome on 24 June 1927 and was fitted with an 85 hp (63 kW) ADC Cirrus II engine to check its handling characteristics. This was then replaced with Major Halford's prototype engine, by then named the Gipsy. The second example, G-EBRV, was fitted with a Cirrus engine and first flew on 28 July 1927.

== Operational history ==
Both aircraft were entered for the 1927 King's Cup Race which was to be held at Hucknall on 30 July; 'QU was withdrawn but Broad flew 'RV in the race, retiring because of handling problems.

In August 1927 Broad flew G-EBQU over a 62-mile (100 km) closed-circuit to set a new record for Class III Light Aircraft of 186.47 mph (300.09 km/h). Five days later he flew to 19,191 ft (5,849 m) without oxygen in an attempt to break the altitude record for its category. For these record attempts the aircraft was fitted with new wings with a reduced span of 19 ft (6 m).

G-EBQU was exported to Australia in 1930 and registered VH-UNH. On 17 September 1930 it crashed when the engine cut out while practising for an air race, killing pilot David Smith. The second airframe was for a time displayed outside de Havilland's Hatfield factory in Hertfordshire, eventually being destroyed there on 3 October 1940 during an air raid.

A replica G-ECDX was constructed by Steve Jones between 1994 and 2024 and is currently airworthy in the UK

== Specifications (G-EBRV) ==
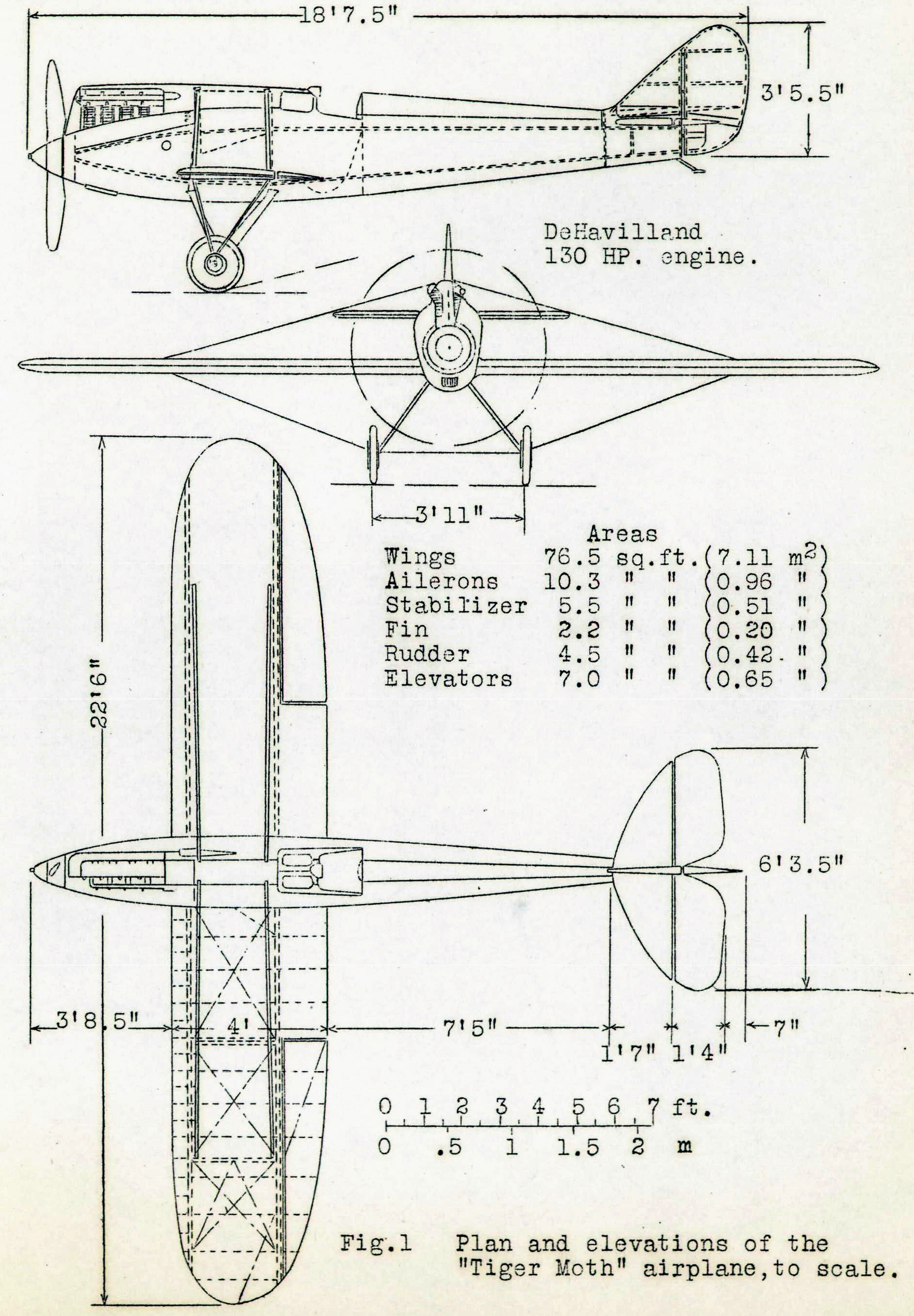
DH 71 3-view drawing from NACA Aircraft Circular 57

Data from De Havilland Aircraft since 1909.

General characteristics

- Crew: 1
- Length: 18 ft 7 in (5.66 m)
- Wingspan: 22 ft 6 in (6.86 m)
- Height: 7 ft 0 in (2.13 m)
- Wing area: 76.5 sq ft (7.11 m^{2})
- Empty weight: 618 lb (280 kg)
- Gross weight: 905 lb (411 kg)
- Powerplant: 1 × ADC Cirrus II inline piston, 85 hp (63 kW)
- Propellers: 2-bladed

Performance

- Maximum speed: 166 mph (267 km/h, 144 kn)

== See also ==
Related lists

- List of de Havilland aircraft

== Bibliography ==
- Jackson, A J (1987). De Havilland Aircraft since 1909 (3rd ed.). London, England: Putnam. ISBN 0-85177-802-X.
- Donald, David, ed. (1997). The Encyclopedia of World Aircraft. Prospero Books. p. 314. ISBN 1-85605-375-X.
