= De Havilland Dormouse =

Two-seat single-engined biplanes

DH.42 Dormouse
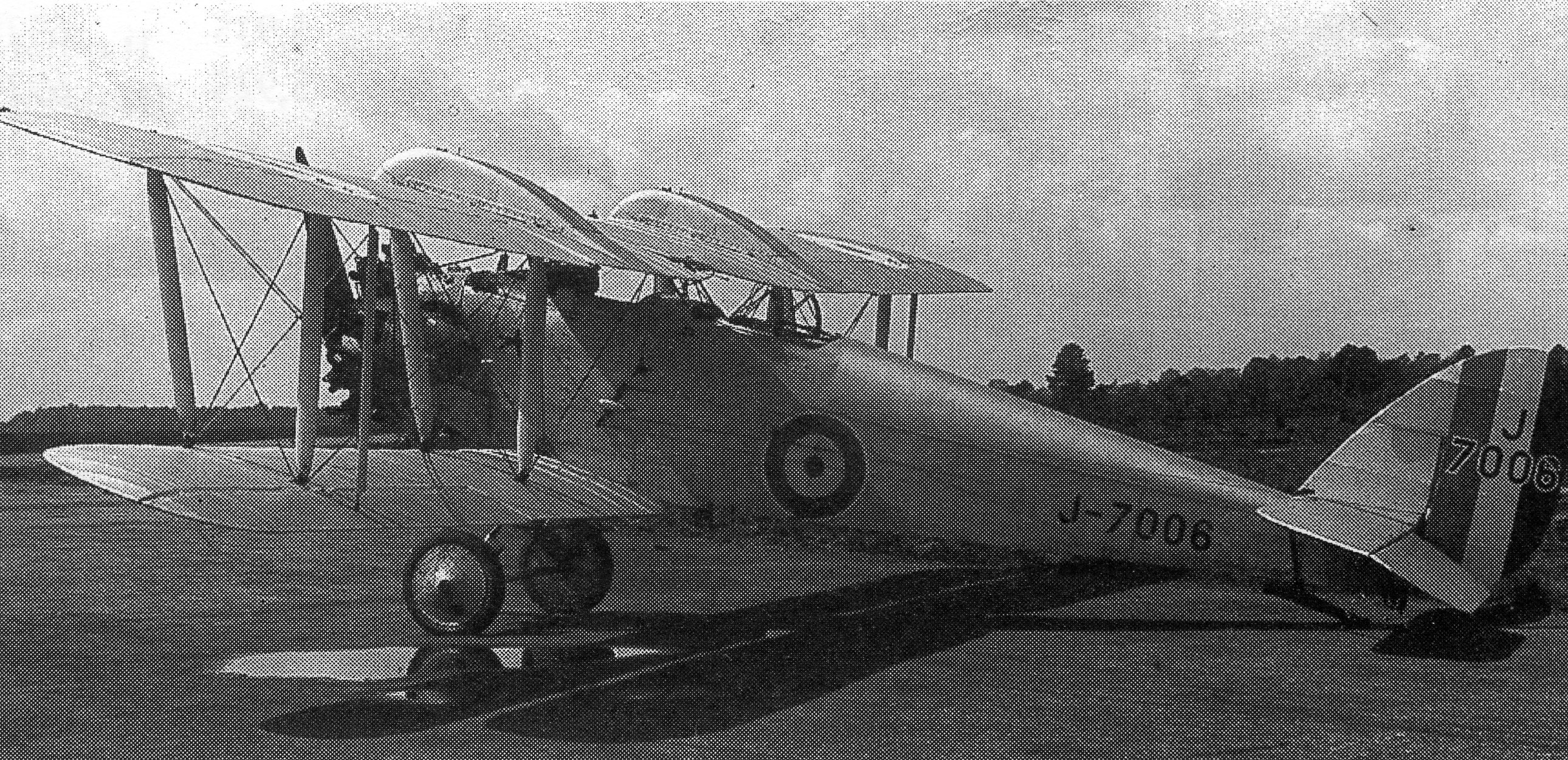
- DH.42A Dingo I

General information
- Type: Reconnaissance fighter
- National origin: United Kingdom
- Manufacturer: de Havilland Aircraft Co. Ltd.
- Status: abandoned
- Number built: 1 × Dormouse, 2 × Dingo

History
- First flight: 25 July 1923
- Retired: 1925

The de Havilland DH.42 Dormouse and its two variants the de Havilland DH.42A Dingo I and II were two-seat single-engined biplanes designed for fighter-reconnaissance and army cooperation roles. They did not achieve production.

== Development ==
Apart from their engines, the de Havilland DH.42 Dormouse and DH.42A Dingo I were very similar aircraft. The Dormouse was built to Air Ministry specification 22/22 as a two-seat reconnaissance fighter and the Dingo to Specification 8/24 for army cooperation. They were two-bay biplanes with unswept wings of constant chord, though the lower wing was slightly smaller in span and only about 73% of the chord when compared to the upper one. The two trailing edges were in line and the trailing struts vertical, but the forward struts were forward-raked. Both wings carried unbalanced ailerons. The vertical tail had the characteristic DH shape, with a balanced rudder; the elevators were unbalanced. The structure throughout was wood, with fabric covering on the wings and empennage, but with de Havilland's usual thin plywood cover on the fuselage. There was a single axle undercarriage, with the main legs attached to the lower wing root and with bracing to the forward fuselage. The pilot's cockpit was under the upper wing centre section and the gunner sat close behind at the trailing edge. In the Dormouse, the pilot had an oval cutout in the wing for upward vision and the gunner a V-shaped notch in the trailing edge to ease his field of fire. In the Dingo, the pilot's cutout was made smaller and circular, whilst the gunner's notch was increased to fuselage width and deepened to the rear wing spar, giving it a straight edge.

The Dormouse first flew from Stag Lane on 25 July 1923 fitted with a 360 hp (270 kW) Armstrong Siddeley Jaguar II radial engine. The Dingo flew for the first time on 12 March 1924 with a 410 hp (305 kW) Bristol Jupiter III radial engine. The nine-cylinder Jupiter had a greater diameter than the double-row, 14-cylinder Jaguar (53 in, 1.35 m rather than 43 in, 1.06 m), so on the Dingo the two forward firing guns were mounted externally on the top of the nose, whereas on the Dormouse they fitted into internal tunnels. The Dormouse later received an uprated (420 hp, 313 kW) Jaguar IV and at the same time had its upper wing centre section altered to match that of the Dingo. Fuel in both machines was contained in a pair of aerofoil section tanks on the top of the upper wing above the inner interplane struts.

The final DH.42 variant was the DH.42B Dingo II, which flew for the first time on 29 September 1926. Externally similar to the two earlier aircraft, The Dingo II had a steel rather than wood frame. Its empty weight was up by 18% over the Dingo I. It used the slightly more powerful (436 hp, 325 kW) Jupiter IV, carried more fuel and had the same top speed as its wooden equivalent.

== Operational history ==
Only these three machines were built. The Dormouse served at the Royal Aircraft Establishment, Farnborough with the Wireless & Photographic Flight for experimental radio work from March to December 1925, when it was written off. The Dingo I crashed at RAF Martlesham Heath in June 1924 during trials and the Dingo II went to Farnborough in November 1926.

== Variants ==
DH.42 Dormouse
Armstrong Siddeley Jaguar III: Armstrong Siddeley Jaguar IV
DH.42A Dingo I
Bristol Jupiter III: slight (6 in, 152 mm) increase in span
DH.42B Dingo II
Bristol Jupiter IV: same dimensions as DH.42A but steel frame and greater weight

== Specifications (DH.42 Dormouse, Jaguar IV) ==
Data from Jackson 1978, pp. 182

General characteristics

- Crew: two
- Length: 28 ft 3 in (8.61 m)
- Wingspan: 41 ft 0 in (12.50 m)
- Wing area: 389 sq ft (36.14 m^{2})
- Empty weight: 2,513 lb (1,140 kg)
- Gross weight: 3,897 lb (1,768 kg)
- Powerplant: 1 × Armstrong Siddeley Jaguar IV 14-cylinder two row radial , 420 hp (313 kW)

Performance

- Maximum speed: 128 mph (206 km/h, 111 kn)
- Service ceiling: 15,700 ft (4,785 m)

Armament

- 2 × forward firing machine guns
- 1 × machine gun on Scarff ring in rear cockpit

== See also ==
The de Havilland Hyena was a Dingo II development.
