= De Havilland Swallow Moth =

1930s aircraft

DH.81 Swallow Moth
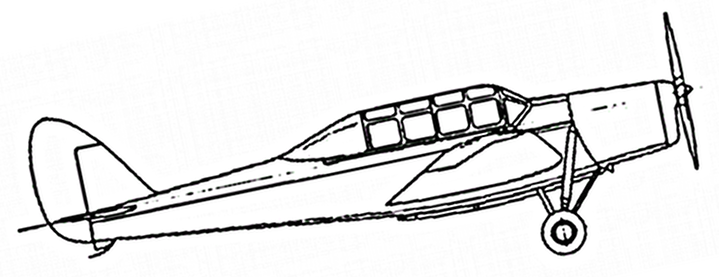
- Drawing of DH.81A configuration

General information
- Type: sports aircraft
- National origin: United Kingdom
- Manufacturer: de Havilland Aircraft Co. Ltd
- Number built: 1

History
- First flight: 21 August 1931
- Retired: 3 February 1932

The de Havilland DH.81 Swallow Moth was aimed at the low-cost sporting aircraft market during the Great Depression. It was a single-engined two-seat, low-wing monoplane; only one was built.

== Development ==
The DH. 81 Swallow Moth was a low-wing cantilever monoplane. This arrangement and its plywood-covered fuselage and closely cowled 80 hp (60 kW) inline Gipsy IV engine gave it a very clean aerodynamic look. The wings carried ailerons that were horn-balanced at the wingtips and the empennage was of characteristic de Havilland form, with a balanced rudder. There was separate tandem seating for two, initially open, but later enclosed with a one-piece hinged cabin top. With this enclosure the aircraft was called the DH.81A and the top speed increased by 12 mph (19 km/h). The main undercarriage was simple, the legs reaching to mid-fuselage in front of the leading edge of the wing, with bracing struts fore and aft to the keel; the later Leopard Moth used a similar arrangement. A small tailskid completed the undercarriage.

The Swallow Moth was first flown at Stag Lane Aerodrome by Geoffrey de Havilland on 21 August 1931. Some alteration to the fin followed and the flight testing continued until February 1932. During this time the class B marking E-7 was allocated, but the Swallow Moth never reached the civil register. Its design influenced later de Havilland aircraft, particularly the 1938 Moth Minor.

== Variants ==
DH.81
Original configuration with a two-seat open cockpit.
DH.81A
Prototype modified with an enclosed cabin and flown from November 1932.

== Specifications ==
Data from de Havilland Aircraft since 1909.

General characteristics

- Crew: one
- Capacity: one
- Length: 23 ft 6 in (7.16 m)
- Wingspan: 35 ft 6 in (10.82 m)
- Height: 8 ft 4 in (2.56 m)
- Wing area: 149 sq ft (13.85 m^{2})
- Gross weight: 1,330 lb (603 kg)
- Powerplant: 1 × de Havilland Gipsy IV four-cylinder inverted inline air-cooled engine , 80 hp (60 kW)

Performance

- Maximum speed: 117 mph (188 km/h, 102 kn)
