= De Havilland Giant Moth =

Early British transport aircraft

DH.61 Giant Moth
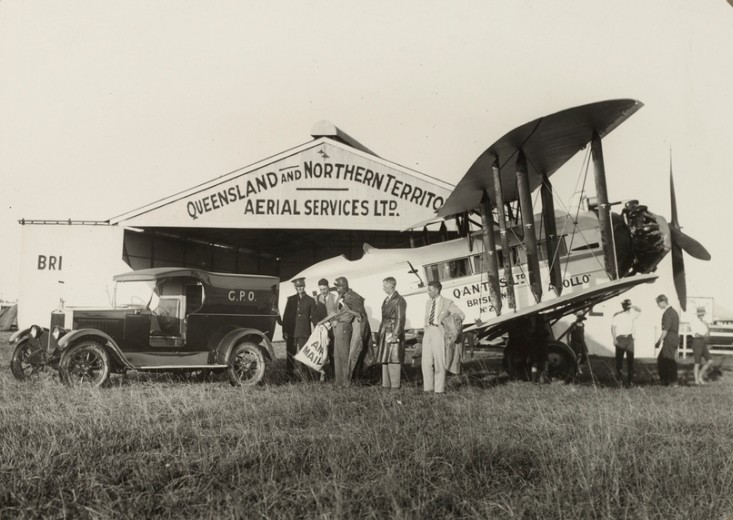
- The arrival of QANTAS DH.61 Apollo, bringing the first air mail to Brisbane on 23 April 1929

General information
- Type: Transport biplane
- Manufacturer: de Havilland
- Number built: 10

History
- Introduction date: 1928
- First flight: December 1927

The de Havilland DH.61 Giant Moth was a 1920s British large single-engined biplane transport built by de Havilland at Stag Lane Aerodrome, Edgware. Intended primarily for use in Australia, a number were also shipped to Canada.

== Design ==
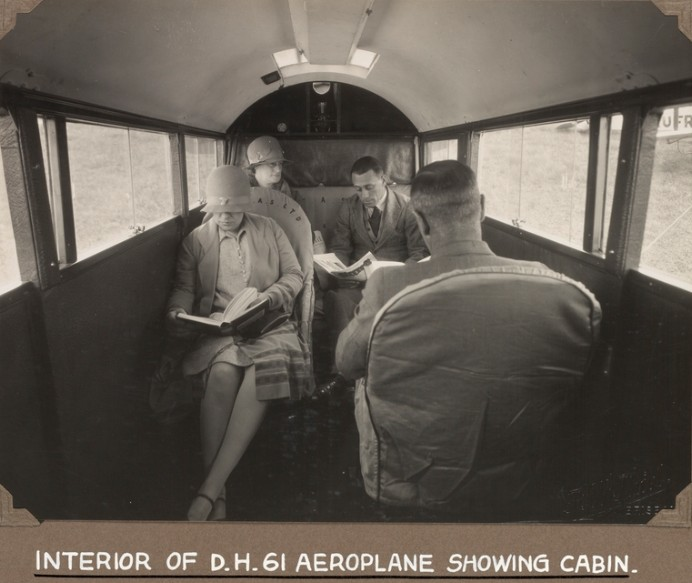
The cabin. QANTAS 1929

Following the success of the de Havilland DH.50J in Australia, the company was asked to design a larger replacement using the Bristol Jupiter engine. The aircraft took only 10 weeks to design and the prototype first flew in December 1927. The cabin had room for six to eight passengers with the pilot in an open cockpit behind the wings. A total of 10 aircraft were built, including one in Canada built from components, with the rest coming from the Stag Lane production line.

A Pathé News clip claims it was the "first commercial plane with folding wings!" and shows a single man folding them.

== Operational history ==
=== Australia and New Guinea ===
Following test flights in England, the aircraft was sent to de Havilland Australia in Melbourne. After reassembly, the prototype first flew on 2 March 1928 and was used on scheduled services between Adelaide and Broken Hill by MacRobertson Miller Aviation. The prototype was originally called Canberra, which was used as a type name until it was changed to Giant Moth.

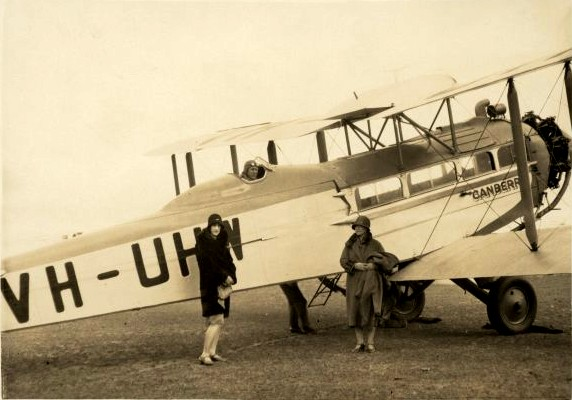
Les Holden in the cockpit of Canberra, with passengers at Mascot Aerodrome, c. 1930

Another (registration G-AUHW) followed in November 1928, but crashed at Cowes, Victoria, before it was delivered to the purchaser, Airgold Ltd. After repairs, it was bought by Les Holden in 1928 for his charter service, based in Mascot, New South Wales. He christened her Canberra. A World War I flying ace, he (and Canberra) would be in the news the next year.

In 1929, Australian aviation pioneers Charles Kingsford Smith and Charles Ulm set out on a Fokker F.VII trimotor monoplane named Southern Cross from Sydney for England. When radio contact was lost, a search was organised. In April 1929, Australian National Airways or the Sydney Citizens' Relief Committee engaged Holden to join the search. Simply getting to the area was difficult. Before the flight from Sydney to Wyndham, an extra 70-gallon petrol tank and a radio were installed. Even with the additional tank, Holden had to stop and find petrol and oil along the way. On 4 or 5 April, Holden, Aero Club ground engineer F. R. Mitchell, Dr. G. R. Hamilton and wireless operator L. S. W. Stannage set out aboard Canberra. According to one newspaper article, Holden flew a total of 9000 miles (14,500 km) and was in the air for 100 hours, before spotting the missing aircraft on a mud flat near the Glenelg River. The crew of Southern Cross were rescued, though two other searchers lost their lives.

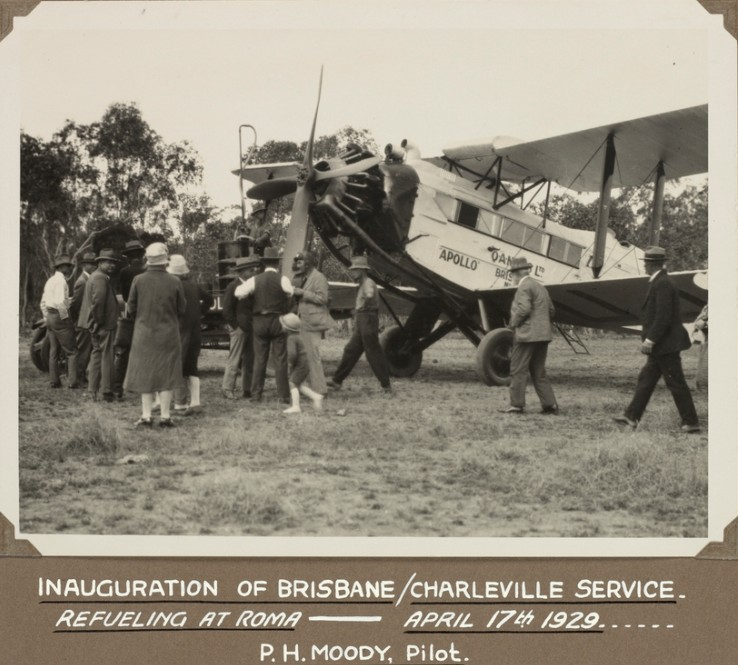
Giant Moth Apollo

QANTAS acquired two Giant Moths, Apollo (G-AUJB) and Diana (G-AUJC), in April and May 1929, respectively. They were the first QANTAS aircraft equipped with toilets. The airline took them out of service in 1935 because the Bristol Jupiter XI engines were unreliable. Apollo was sold that year and crashed near Mubo, New Guinea, on 9 May 1938.

=== Canada ===
Three aircraft for Canada (G-CAPG, G-CARD and G-CAJT) were fitted with Short Brothers floats at Rochester before one was delivered to Canadian Vickers. This aircraft (G-CAJT) was sent to Western Canada Airlines Ltd. on a rental arrangement. During a proving flight on 23 October 1928, the Giant Moth suffered structural damage in the air and crashed at Calgary, Alberta in a non-fatal accident. The other DH.61s continued to fly in Ontario in fire-fighting operations. One Giant Moth (CF-OAK) was modified from parts and flew with a Pratt & Witney Hornet engine.

=== United Kingdom ===
Geraldine (G-AAAN) was bought by the Daily Mail to carry a photographer and his motorcycle around the United Kingdom. The aircraft would land at the nearest airfield to a story. This aircraft was also equipped with a dark room to develop the photographs during the return journey. Later, it was sold to National Flying Services and renamed Leone. Western Australian Airways acquired it in the early 1930s; it served Western Australia from 1931 to 1935. When the airline encountered financial difficulties, the Giant Moth was sold to New Guinea Airlines. G-AAAN crashed on 20 August 1935, while landing at Wau, New Guinea.

Youth of Britain (G-AAEV), modified to carry 10 passengers, was used by Sir Alan Cobham in an aviation promotional tour of the United Kingdom lasting 21 weeks and ending on 7 October 1929. Cobham flew 60,000 miles (97,000 km), visited 110 towns and took aloft 40,000 passengers, including 10,000 schoolchildren free of charge. Among those who experienced their first flight in Cobham's Giant Moth was Eric Lock, who became a Royal Air Force fighter ace during the Battle of Britain. After the tour, Cobham sold the Giant Moth to Imperial Airways, to be used for survey flights. Its use was short-lived; G-AAEV was lost in a crash landing by Charles Wolley-Dod on 19 January 1930.

== Operators ==
- Australia
  - Guinea Airways Ltd.
  - Holden Air Transport Ltd.
  - MacRobertson Miller Airlines
  - Qantas
  - West Australian Airlines Ltd.
- Brazil
  - Varig
- Colombia
  - Avianca
- Canada
  - London Air Transport Ltd.
  - Ontario Provincial Air Services
  - Western Canada Airways Ltd.
- United Kingdom
  - Alan Cobham Aviation Ltd.
  - Associated Newspapers Ltd.
  - Imperial Airways Ltd.
  - National Flying Services Ltd.

== Specifications ==
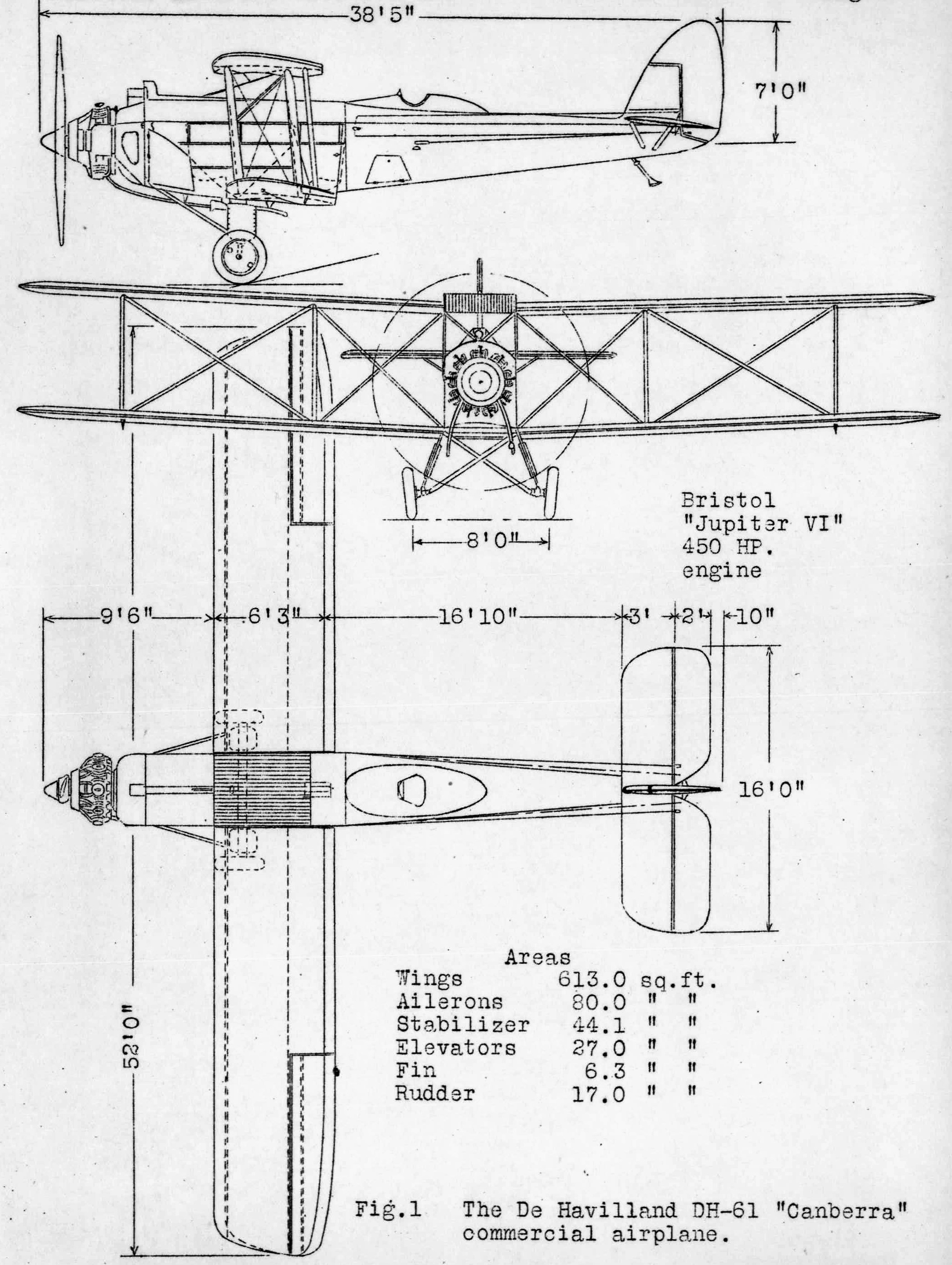
DH.61 3-View drawing from NACA Aircraft Circular No.65

Data from British civil aircraft since1919 : Volume Two

General characteristics

- Crew: 1
- Capacity: 6 passengers
- Length: 39 ft 0 in (11.89 m)
- Wingspan: 52 ft 0 in (15.85 m)
- Height: 12 ft 0 in (3.66 m)
- Wing area: 613 sq ft (56.9 m^{2})
- Airfoil: RAF 15
- Empty weight: 3,650 lb (1,656 kg)
- Gross weight: 7,000 lb (3,175 kg)
- Powerplant: 1 × Bristol Jupiter XI 9-cylinder air-cooled radial piston engine, 500 hp (370 kW)
- Propellers: 4-bladed fixed-pitch propeller

Performance

- Maximum speed: 132 mph (212 km/h, 115 kn)
- Cruise speed: 110 mph (180 km/h, 96 kn)
- Range: 650 mi (1,050 km, 560 nmi)
- Service ceiling: 18,000 ft (5,500 m)
- Rate of climb: 900 ft/min (4.6 m/s)
