= Stag Lane Aerodrome =

- IATA: none; ICAO: none

Summary
- Airport type: Civil
- Operator: de Havilland
- Location: Edgware, London
- In use: 1915–1933
- Elevation AMSL: 170 ft / 52 m
- Coordinates: 51°35′49″N 000°16′26″W

Map
- Location in London

Stag Lane Aerodrome was a private aerodrome between 1915 and 1933 in Edgware, north London, UK.

== History ==
The land for an aerodrome was purchased by the London & Provincial Aviation Company (Warren and Smiles – Michael Geoffrey Smiles of Bonnington died in 1921) in October 1915. The company used the aerodrome for flying training during the First World War. London & Provincial ceased flying in July 1919 after a dispute with Department of Civil Aviation (see United Kingdom Civil Aviation Authority), which refused them a licence.

Stag Lane became the main base of The de Havilland Aircraft Company Limited in 1920 and they purchased the freehold in 1922. Former wartime aircraft were refurbished in the early years, and the company designed and built large numbers of aircraft at Stag Lane in the 1920s and early 1930s. In 1934 the company moved to a larger factory and airfield at Hatfield Aerodrome, Hatfield, Hertfordshire.

Stag Lane Aerodrome was sold for housing development in 1933, though a small 15-acre (61,000 m^{2}) site was retained as a factory and offices for the de Havilland Engine Company Limited. The last flight from the airfield was by a de Havilland DH.87 Hornet Moth, G -ACTA in July 1934, by which time the company factory had been relocated to Hatfield, Hertfordshire.

=== British Telecom ===
In 1976 the GPO (later British Telecom) opened the world's largest international exchange on the site, due to the hold ups in the construction of their new Mondial House, with the "De Havilland" Plessey TXK2 and "Mollison" Ericsson TXK5. The exchange closed in 1988, as most of the analogue technology was out of date.

The premises was subsequently used by Bacs (The Bankers Automated Clearing House) for a number of years. It housed the administrative offices and computer centre for processing a very high volume of the UK’s inter-bank payments.

Eventually the site was demolished and replaced with housing.

== Aircraft built at Stag Lane ==
- Cierva C.24 Autogiro
- de Havilland DH.34
- de Havilland DH.50
- de Havilland DH.51
- de Havilland DH.53 Humming Bird
- de Havilland DH.60 Moth/Gipsy Moth
- de Havilland DH.61 Giant Moth
- de Havilland DH.65 Hound
- de Havilland DH.66 Hercules
- de Havilland DH.71 Tiger Moth
- de Havilland DH.75 Hawk Moth
- de Havilland DH.80 Puss Moth
- de Havilland DH.82 Tiger Moth
- de Havilland DH.83 Fox Moth
- de Havilland DH.84 Dragon
- de Havilland DH.85 Leopard Moth
- de Havilland DH.86 Express
- de Havilland DH.87a Hornet Moth
