= Hatfield Aerodrome =

- IATA: HTF; ICAO: EGTH

Summary
- Airport type: Closed
- Owner: de Havilland Aircraft Company (1930–1960); Hawker Siddeley (1960–1977); British Aerospace (1977–closure)
- Location: Hatfield, Hertfordshire; 3NM NE of St Albans
- In use: 1930–1994
- Elevation AMSL: 254 ft / 77 m
- Coordinates: 51°45′57″N 0°15′03″W

Map
- Location within Hertfordshire

Runways
Direction	Length		Surface
Direction	ft	m	Surface
06/24	5,980	1,823	Concrete (from 1947)
14/32	2,198	670	Grass
- Source: Pooley's Flight Guide United Kingdom & Ireland 1988

Hatfield Aerodrome (IATA: HTF, ICAO: EGTH) was a private airfield and aircraft factory located in the English town of Hatfield in Hertfordshire from 1930 until its closure and redevelopment in the 1990s.

== Early history ==
Geoffrey de Havilland, pioneering aircraft designer and founder of the de Havilland Aircraft Company purchased some farmland close to Hatfield as his existing site at Stag Lane, Edgware was being encroached upon by expanding housing developments in the London suburbs. Flying commenced in 1930, but the clubhouse buildings and adjacent recreational facilities, fuel pumps and sheds were not completed until 1933.

Hatfield's former ICAO code, EGTH, was reallocated to Old Warden Aerodrome in Bedfordshire.

== 1930s expansion ==
In 1934 significant works were undertaken at the site and a large factory and imposing Art Deco administration buildings were constructed together with a flying school building which also housed flying control. Later, an experimental block was added to the north of the factory. Production of aircraft moved from Stag Lane and during this time principally consisted of a range of small biplanes such as the Moth family, DH.84 Dragon, DH.86 Express and DH.89 Dragon Rapide.

== Wartime ==
During the Second World War, de Havilland was most noted for its Mosquito fighter bomber, the famous 'Wooden wonder'. This was developed privately at Salisbury Hall, outside of Hatfield to avoid being targeted by German bombers. The Hatfield site itself was camouflaged but was bombed on 3 October 1940 by a Junkers Ju 88. Four bombs hit the '94 shop' building, killing 21, injuring more than 70 and disrupting work on the Mosquito. The Junkers Ju 88 was hit and brought down by the crew of a Bofors gun on the airfield commanded by Sgt 'Mont' Chapman, crashing a few kilometres away near East End Green: the crew survived and were captured by local farmworkers.

== Postwar ==
A hard runway was laid in 1947. Expansion of the facilities was called for by rapid development of military and civil jet aircraft such as the Vampire and Comet. The factory was enlarged and a new flight test hangar and control tower was constructed. Additionally, a large design block was constructed alongside the administration buildings.

== Manor Road site ==
De Havilland had been developing and manufacturing propellers and piston engines in addition to airframes. Post-war, the engine company continued developing jet engines, with testing taking place at Manor Road and production at nearby Leavesden. The propeller company moved into developing rockets, guided missiles and Britain's ballistic missile, the Blue Streak. Production facilities, test facilities, wind tunnels, water tanks, hangars and an administration building were located on the Manor Road site, on the opposite side of the main runway to the aircraft factories.

== 1960s and 70s ==
The de Havilland Aircraft Company was acquired by Hawker Siddeley in 1960 and the de Havilland name ceased to be used in 1963. At Hatfield, the Trident airliner and DH.125 were under development in the early 1960s, with production of the latter taking place at de Havilland's other factory at Hawarden. Design studies for feederliners that would ultimately lead to the HS.146 took place as well as studies for a pan-European aircraft, the HBN.100 which would eventually become the Airbus A300. Hatfield once again changed ownership when Hawker Siddeley was merged with the British Aircraft Corporation and Scottish Aviation under the Aircraft and Shipbuilding Industries Act to form British Aerospace in 1978. This resulted in the 146 programme going ahead, which saved many jobs at Hatfield and secured the site as a centre of design and production of commercial aircraft for the next decade.

== 1980s and 90s ==
The 146 first flew in 1981 and production of some components, final assembly and flight testing of the first two series of the aircraft was based at Hatfield during the early and mid-1980s. In 1987, a new final assembly hall was built for 146 production to coincide with the introduction of the stretched 146-300 derivative. Further development resulted in the demolition of the 1930s flying club buildings to make way for the Bishop Square office block development, constructed in 1991 and named in honour of Comet designer R.E. Bishop.

In 1992, due to severe financial problems, British Aerospace announced the cessation of aircraft production at Hatfield from 1993. By then, work at the Manor Road site, which had become part of BAe Dynamics, had wound down and this site was cleared first. Friday 8 April 1994 was Hatfield's last day as an airfield, when a DH Chipmunk – the type that had made the first landing on the new runway – was the last plane to take off from the main runway, followed by a DH Tiger Moth – carrying a De Havilland flag – which took off from the grass at the side of the runway.

The airfield closed but was later used as a film set for Saving Private Ryan and the television series Band of Brothers.

== Redevelopment ==
Arlington Securities, then the property division of BAE Systems, began the redevelopment of the main airfield site in the late 1990s. Only the Grade II* listed 1950s flight test hangar and administration buildings were retained: all other buildings, the taxiways and the runway were removed to make way for offices, businesses and homes. Today the flight test hangar survives as a leisure centre, whilst the rest of the site is divided between the University of Hertfordshire, housing and a business park.

== Heritage Trail ==
The Hatfield Aerodrome History Trail was officially opened on 24 November 2010. It forms part of a Heritage Lottery Fund project by the University of Hertfordshire to mark the 80th anniversary of the opening of the airfield.

The trail is around 4 km long and takes around 90 minutes to walk; a shorter version is around 3 km and takes around 60 minutes. There are ten information boards located around the trail. The first board, at the start of the trail, is outside the University of Hertfordshire's de Havilland Campus (the university's origins can be traced back to the de Havilland Technical School). A leaflet with a map of the route is available at the reception.

== Units ==
The following units were stationed at Hatfield:

- No. 1 Anti-Aircraft Calibration Flight
- No. 1 Elementary and Reserve Flying Training School RAF
- No. 1 Elementary Flying Training School RAF
- No. 2 Squadron RAF
- No. 3 Ferry Pilots Pool
- No. 5 Ferry Pilots Pool
- No. 8 Maintenance Unit RAF
- No. 15 Maintenance Unit RAF
- No. 116 Squadron RAF
- No. 239 Squadron RAF
- ATA School
- ATA (Women's Section)
