= Hart Aircraft Service =

Australian aviation company

IATA	ICAO	Call sign
-	-	-
- Founded: 1929
- Ceased operations: 1938
- Fleet size: 2
- Destinations: Melbourne, Launceston, Tasmania
- Headquarters: Essendon Airport, Australia
- Key people: James Hart, John Hider and Norman Charles Trescowthick

Hart Aircraft Service Pty. Ltd. was an Australian aviation company registered at Melbourne in mid-1929 with directors James Hart, John Hider and Norman Charles Trescowthick. Director James Hart (c1891-1951) was a former Royal Flying Corp aviator who had flown as gunner for Hereward de Havilland. Norman Trescowthick had served with distinction in the Australian Flying Corps' famous 4th Squadron with Arthur H. Cobby during the First World War.

== History ==
Although intended as an aircraft manufacturing and repair business based at Essendon Airport, by late 1929 it owned a De Havilland Gipsy Moth VH-UKV Diana that it used for charter flights. It serviced the aircraft of the first Australian National Airways (ANA) when it began regular flights to Melbourne in 1930. The company became Australian agents for Desoutter aircraft, and one of these machines was used in the unsuccessful searches for ANA's missing Avro 618 Ten Southern Cloud over several months in 1931.

In April 1933 the company began a regular passenger service between Melbourne and Launceston, Tasmania (sometimes via Flinders Island) using the Avro 618 Ten VH-UMG Tasman, formerly ANA's Southern Star. It was later authorised to carry airmails on this service. However, following its failure to be awarded a contract for this leg of the Empire Air Mail Scheme early in 1934, it withdrew from the Tasmanian service in March of that year.

Hart Aircraft Service continued its aviation servicing business at Essendon Airport until 1938 when it sold its operations to Victorian & Interstate Airways.

== Fleet ==
- De Havilland Gipsy Moth
- Avro 618 Ten

== See also ==
- List of defunct airlines of Australia
- Aviation in Australia
