= De Havilland Leopard Moth =

1930s British light aircraft

DH.85 Leopard Moth
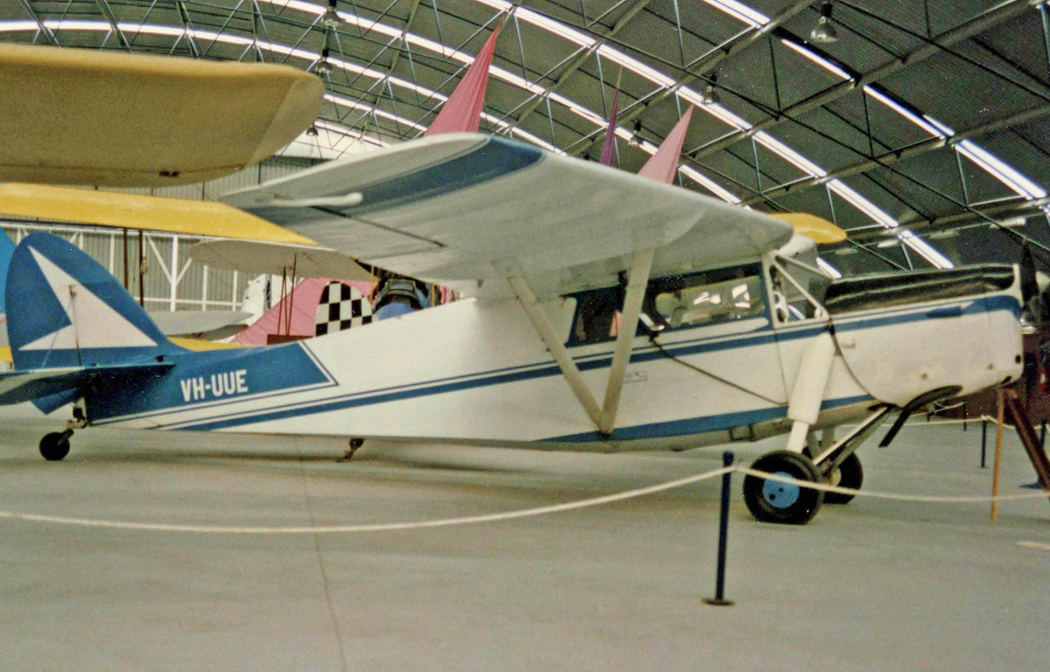
- Leopard Moth exported to Australia in 1935, exhibited airworthy at the Drage Air World Museum at Wangaratta Airport Victoria in 1988

General information
- Type: Three-seat cabin monoplane
- Manufacturer: de Havilland
- Primary users: United Kingdom private pilots Australian pilots
- Number built: 133

History
- Manufactured: 1933-1936
- Introduction date: 8 July 1933
- First flight: 27 May 1933

The de Havilland DH.85 Leopard Moth is a three-seat high-wing cabin monoplane designed and built by the de Havilland Aircraft Company in 1933.

== Design and construction ==
It was a successor to the DH.80 Puss Moth and replaced it on the company's Stag Lane and later Hatfield production lines. It was similar in configuration to the earlier aircraft, but instead of a fuselage with tubular steel framework, a lighter all-plywood structure was used which allowed a substantial improvement in range, performance and capacity on the same type of engine. The pilot is seated centrally in front of two side-by-side passengers and the wings can be folded for hangarage.

== Operational history ==
The prototype first flew on 27 May 1933 and in July won the King's Cup Race at an average speed of 139.5 mph (224.5 km/h), piloted by Geoffrey de Havilland. A total of 133 aircraft were built, including 71 for owners in the British Isles, and 10 for Australia, including one delivered to Nancy Bird Walton, the first female commercial air operator in Australia. Other examples were exported to France, Germany, India, South Africa and Switzerland. Production of the Leopard Moth ended in 1936.

44 Leopard Moths were impressed into military service in Britain and others in Australia during World War II, mostly as communications aircraft. Only a few managed to survive six years of hard usage although a small number were still airworthy seventy years after the last was completed. Six remained operational in the U.K. in 2009.

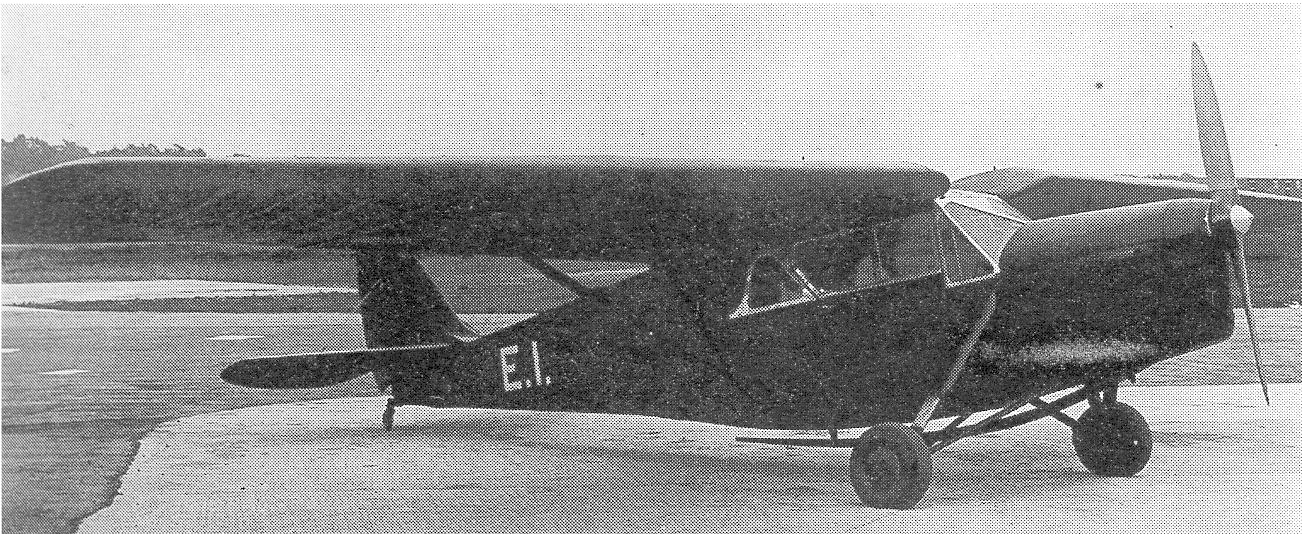
The first prototype Leopard Moth

== Operators ==
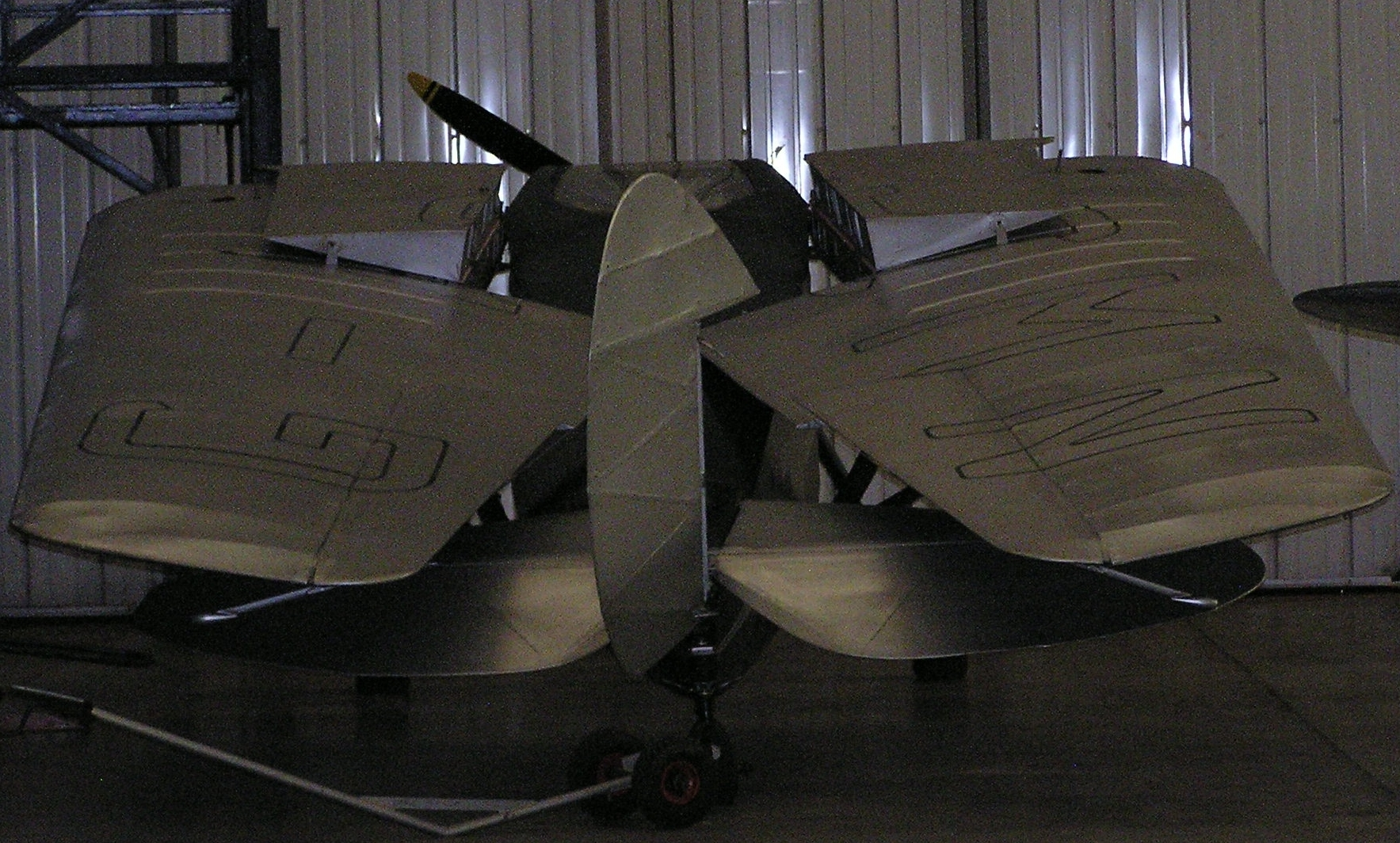
Leopard Moth, showing complicated wing fold

=== Military operators ===
Belgian Congo

- Aviation militaire de la Force publique First aircraft (C-1) entered service 9 October 1940.

France

- L'Armée de l'Air

Germany

- Luftwaffe (small numbers)

India

- Royal Indian Air Force

Netherlands

- Dutch Army Aviation Group

Portugal

- Portuguese Air Force

South Africa

- South African Air Force

Southern Rhodesia

- Southern Rhodesian Air Force operated one aircraft only.

Spain

- Spanish Air Force

Straits Settlements

- Malayan Volunteer Air Force

United Kingdom

- Royal Air Force impressed into service a number of former civil aircraft, using them as communications and liaison aircraft during the Second World War.
- Royal Navy impressed into service two former civil aircraft.

Kingdom of Yugoslavia

- Royal Yugoslav Air Force operated one aircraft only.

=== Airline operators ===
India

- Air India

== Specifications (DH.85) ==
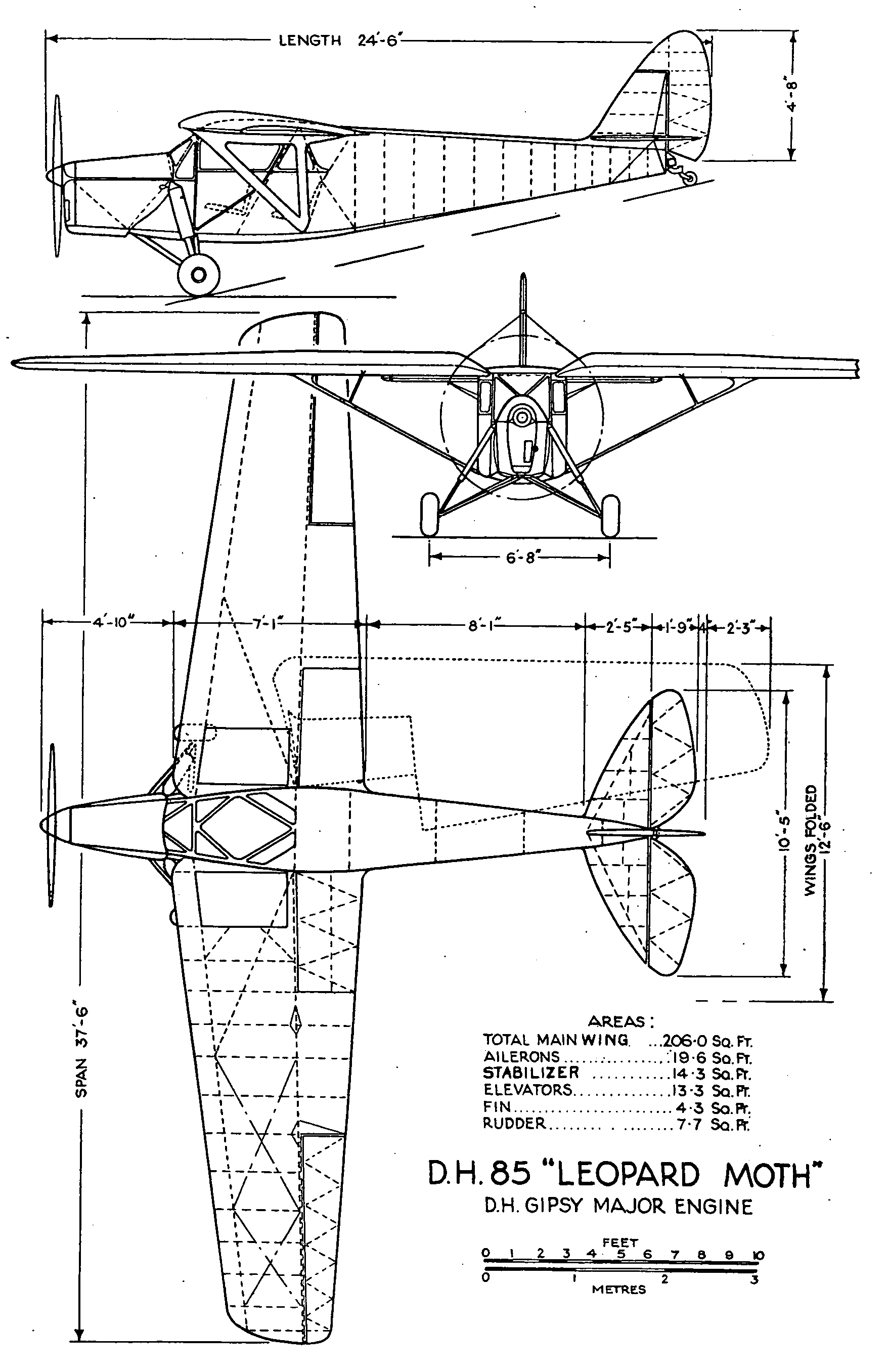
De Havilland DH.85 3-view drawing from NACA-AC-186

Data from De Havilland Aircraft since 1909

General characteristics

- Crew: 1
- Capacity: 2 passengers
- Length: 24 ft 6 in (7.47 m)
- Wingspan: 37 ft 6 in (11.43 m)
- Height: 8 ft 9 in (2.67 m)
- Wing area: 206 sq ft (19.1 m^{2})
- Empty weight: 1,290 lb (585 kg)
- Max takeoff weight: 2,225 lb (1,009 kg)
- Powerplant: 1 × de Havilland Gipsy Major 4-cylinder air-cooled inverted in-line piston engine, 130 hp (97 kW)
- Propellers: 2-bladed fixed-pitch propeller

Performance

- Maximum speed: 137 mph (220 km/h, 119 kn)
- Cruise speed: 119 mph (192 km/h, 103 kn)
- Range: 715 mi (1,151 km, 621 nmi)
- Service ceiling: 21,500 ft (6,600 m)
- Rate of climb: 550 ft/min (2.8 m/s)

== See also ==
Related development

- DH.80 Puss Moth

Aircraft of comparable role, configuration, and era

- Comte AC-12
- RWD-13
- Caudron Phalene

== Bibliography ==
- Comas, Matthieu (September–October 2020). "So British!: 1939–1940, les avions britanniques dans l'Armée de l'Air" [So British!: British Aircraft in the French Air Force 1939–1940]. Avions (in French). No. 236. pp. 38–61. ISSN 1243-8650.
- Jackson, A. J. (1987). De Havilland Aircraft since 1909 (Third ed.). London: Putnam. ISBN 0-85177-802-X.
- Jackson, A. J. (1988). British Civil Aircraft 1919–1972: Volume II (1988 ed.). London: Putnam (Conway Maritime Press).
- Sturtivant, Ray; Burrow, Mick (1995). Fleet Air Arm Aircraft 1939 to 1945. Tunbridge Wells, UK: Air-Britain (Historians) Ltd. ISBN 0-85130-232-7.
