= Miles Hawk Speed Six =

1930s British monoplane

Hawk Speed Six
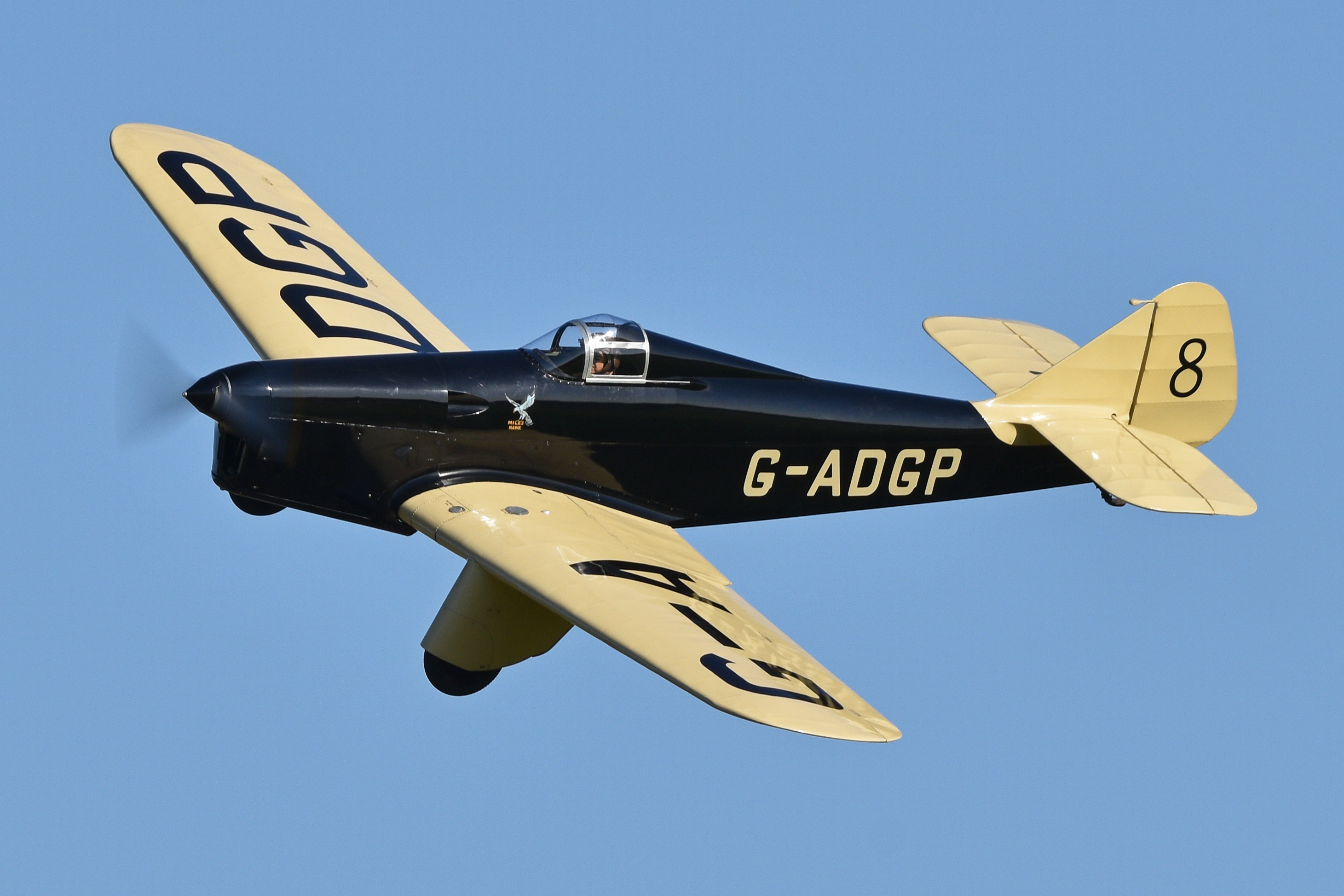
- Hawk Speed Six G-ADGP at the Shuttleworth Collection

General information
- Type: Single-seat racing monoplane
- Manufacturer: Miles Aircraft Limited
- Designer: Frederick George Miles
- Number built: 3

History
- First flight: 1934
- Developed from: Miles Hawk Major

The Miles Hawk Speed Six was a 1930s British two-seat light monoplane, developed by Miles Aircraft from the Miles Hawk Major by fitting the longer and more powerful Gipsy Six engine and removing the forward crew member.

== Design and development ==
The Hawk Major was a variant of the two-seat Miles M.2 Hawk low-wing cantilever monoplane, developed by F.G. Miles to take advantage of the new inverted de Havilland Gipsy Major engine. The Hawk Speed Six was developed in parallel as a more powerful single-seat racer, as the one-off M.2E, with the 200 hp de Havilland Gipsy Six engine. To make room for the longer, six-cylinder engine the front cockpit was removed, making it a single-seater, and the rear cockpit was repositioned to retain balance.

== Operational history ==
Only three examples of the Speed Six were built, each tailored to its specific requirements, but they had a significant impact on the Golden Age of British air racing:

=== M.2E Hawk Speed Six G-ACTE ===
G-ACTE was the prototype Speed Six, powered by a 200 hp de Havilland Gipsy Six engine. It was first flown in 1934, the same year as the Hawk Major.

G-ACTE was initially sold to Sir Charles Rose. It was subsequently bought by Bill Humble, and sold abroad in 1937.

=== M.2L Hawk Speed Six G-ADGP ===
G-ADGP was built to the order of Luis Fontés for the 1935 King's Cup air race. Compared to the prototype it had greater dihedral and split trailing-edge flaps. Again powered by the 200 hp de Havilland Gipsy Six engine, it was completed in 1935. Unfortunately, it failed to complete the race that year. Fontes went on to race it for several years, with some success. During this period it underwent progressive modification. It was further modified for the 1939 King's Cup, but the race was cancelled. By now the canopy had been modified and the wing span reduced from 38 ft to 28 ft.

The aircraft has changed hands several times since and had a significant postwar racing career.

G-ADGP is now flying with the Shuttleworth Collection, still with its original engine.

=== M.2U Hawk Speed Six G-ADOD ===
G-ADOD was built to the order of Ruth Fontés, who already owned M2F Hawk Major G-ACXT, with the intent of beating her brother Luis (see above) in the 1935 King's Cup. It was fitted with an even more powerful 220 hp Gipsy Six R racing engine, originally developed for the de Havilland DH.88 Comet racer. Fontés entered the race under the pseudonym "Miss R. Slow" but, like her brother, failed to complete the race.

In 1936 A. E. Clouston and his backer F. E. Tasker bought G-ADOD. Clouston had it modified with a cockpit canopy, reclining seat and greater fuel capacity, and entered it in the Schlesinger Race from Portsmouth to Johannesburg. Engine trouble forced him down 150 miles south of Salisbury, just short of the finish. The plane was destroyed in the crash-landing.

Clouston salvaged the engine and brought it back to England. It remained in store with Essex Aero until after WWII. When the company went bankrupt, the engine was auctioned off to a private collector. It is one of only two Gipsy Six R engines to have survived.

== Surviving aircraft ==
- M.2L Speed Six G-ADGP is airworthy in 2022 and in the Shuttleworth Collection based at Old Warden.

== Specifications (M.2L) ==
Data from British Civil Aircraft 1919–1972: Volume 3

General characteristics

- Crew: One
- Length: 24 ft 0 in (7.32 m)
- Wingspan: 33 ft 0 in (10.06 m)
- Height: 6 ft 8 in (2.03 m)
- Wing area: 169 sq ft (15.7 m^{2})
- Empty weight: 1,355 lb (615 kg)
- Gross weight: 1,900 lb (862 kg)
- Powerplant: 1 × de Havilland Gipsy Six 1F , 200 hp (150 kW)

Performance

- Maximum speed: 185 mph (298 km/h, 161 kn)
- Cruise speed: 160 mph (260 km/h, 140 kn)
- Rate of climb: 1,450 ft/min (7.4 m/s)

== See also ==
Aircraft of comparable role, configuration, and era

- Percival Mew Gull
