= Miles Magister =

1937 trainer aircraft family by Miles

M.14 Magister
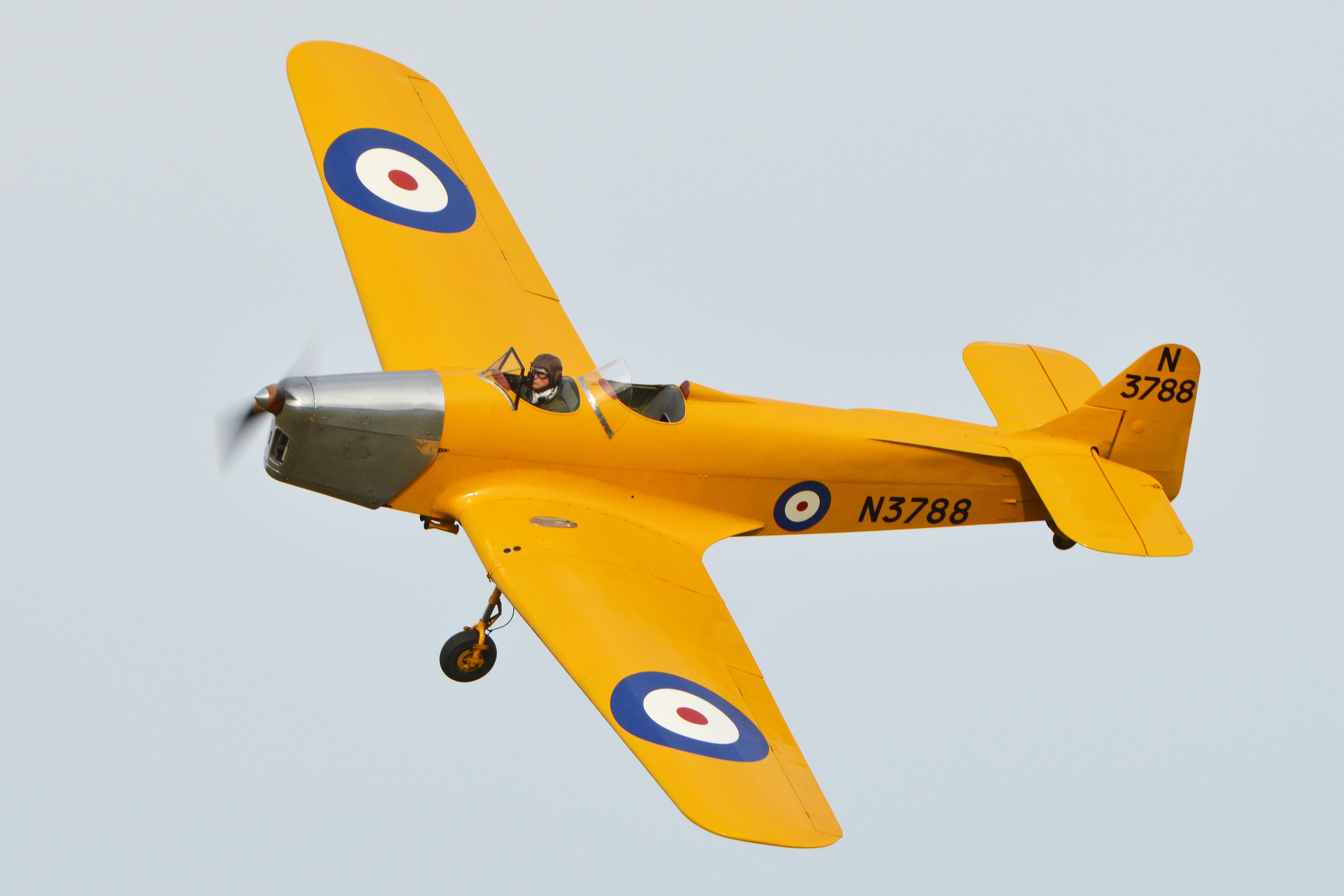
- A restored Miles Magister in flight

General information
- Type: Trainer
- Manufacturer: Miles Aircraft
- Designer: G. H. Miles
- Primary users: Royal Air Force Fleet Air Arm
- Number built: 1,303

History
- First flight: 20 March 1937
- Developed from: Miles Hawk Trainer

The Miles M.14 Magister is a two-seat monoplane basic trainer aircraft designed and built by the British aircraft manufacturer Miles Aircraft. It was affectionately known as the Maggie. It was authorised to perform aerobatics.

The Magister was developed during the 1930s to Specification T.40/36, itself based on the existing Miles Hawk Trainer which had been ordered in small numbers. The first prototype's maiden flight was on 20 March 1937. It quickly became praised for its handling qualities, and was ordered into quantity production.

Entering service barely a year before the start of the Second World War, the Magister became a key training aircraft. It was the first monoplane designed as a trainer to be used by the Royal Air Force (RAF). During the war it was purchased in large numbers for the RAF, the Fleet Air Arm and various overseas military operators. It proved an ideal introduction to the Spitfire and Hurricane for new pilots.

After the war surplus Magisters were exported in large numbers, with many converted for civilian use.

== Development ==
=== Background ===
The origin of the Miles Magister was a decision made by the company's management in 1936 to further develop its military trainer range; this decision was influenced by the firm's recent success with the Miles M.2 Hawk Trainer as an elementary trainer, the first low-wing monoplane to be adopted as a trainer by the Royal Air Force (RAF). It was decided to produce a derivative of the Hawk Trainer to satisfy the Air Ministry's Specification T.40/36. The submission ignored the policy of only procuring metal aircraft which the RAF had at the time.

The new type was broadly similar to the Hawk Trainer: the majority of the differences between the two pertained to the cockpit, which was enlarged and had numerous new features to better meet military training requirements. The first prototype made its maiden flight on 20 March 1937, flown by F.G. Miles. During the following month, the aircraft was named the Magister. During early flights the aircraft exhibited a tendency to spin; this problem was solved by several modifications, including elevating the tailplane by 6 in (15 cm), the fitting of anti-spin strakes to the rear fuselage and the adoption of a taller rudder. The alterations worked so well that the Magister became the first low-wing cantilever monoplane to be authorised by the Air Ministry to perform aerobatics.

=== Design ===
The Magister is a low wing cantilever monoplane whose design is derived from Miles' Hawk Trainer. Noticeable differences include the significant enlargement of the cockpit, since a more spacious cockpit was required to reasonably accommodate the presence of parachutes and various training aids, including the provision of blind-flying apparatus. The open cockpits have windscreens made of Perspex; baggage and unused equipment can be stored in a sizable bay aft of the rear cockpit via an exterior door. Pilots are required to enter and exit the aircraft via a wingroot walkway on the starboard side.

The Magister is largely built of wood, the fuselage consisting of a spruce structure with a plywood covering; similar materials were used for the three-piece wing and the tail unit. The wing centre section has no dihedral and is of constant section with outer sections having dihedral and tapering towards the tip. It has split flaps as standard; it was the first RAF trainer to have flaps. It has a fixed tailwheel undercarriage with drag-reducing spats on the main wheels; to reduce the landing distance, the undercarriage was fitted with Bendix drum brakes. Power is provided by a 130 hp de Havilland Gipsy Major engine and the fuel is contained in a pair of tanks in the centre section.

The flying characteristics and performance of the Magister lent themselves well to the trainer role; the Magister possessed superior performance to any contemporary elementary trainer. It readily enabled trainee pilots to safely learn the handling techniques of modern frontline fighter aircraft. Its ease of handling and safety were attributes that were vigorously demonstrated by Frederick Miles performing stunts such as hands-free landings and formation flying while inverted. The flight controls are cable-actuated; some of the controls, such as the rudder pedals, can be adjusted to suit the individual pilot.

=== Into production ===
Having been impressed by the prototype's performance during trials, the Air Ministry selected the Magister to fulfil the specification. Production began in October 1937. Recognising the importance and value represented by the order, the company committed a significant portion of its manufacturing capacity to producing the type, abandoning its plans to produce other aircraft, such as the Miles Peregrine, to concentrate resources on the mass production effort.

Production of the Magister continued until 1941, by which time 1,203 aircraft had been built by Miles. More than a hundred Magisters were licence built in Turkey. Contemporary glues used to assemble the wooden aircraft have not stood the test of time and few Magisters have survived.

== Operational history ==
Initially, production Magisters were supplied to flying clubs operated by the Straight Corporation, as well as to several overseas government customers. By the Second World War, in excess of 700 Magisters had entered service with RAF Elementary Flying Training Schools; the type would eventually equip 16 such schools as well as the Central Flying School. The bulk of civilian-owned Hawk Majors were also pressed into military service as trainers alongside the type.

During June 1940, as part of British anti-invasion preparations, roughly 15 Magisters were fitted with bomb racks for the carriage of up to eight 25 lb (11.5 kg) bombs, to fly as a light bombers under a scheme called Operation Banquet. The preparations were never put into effect and the type never saw active combat use in this capacity.

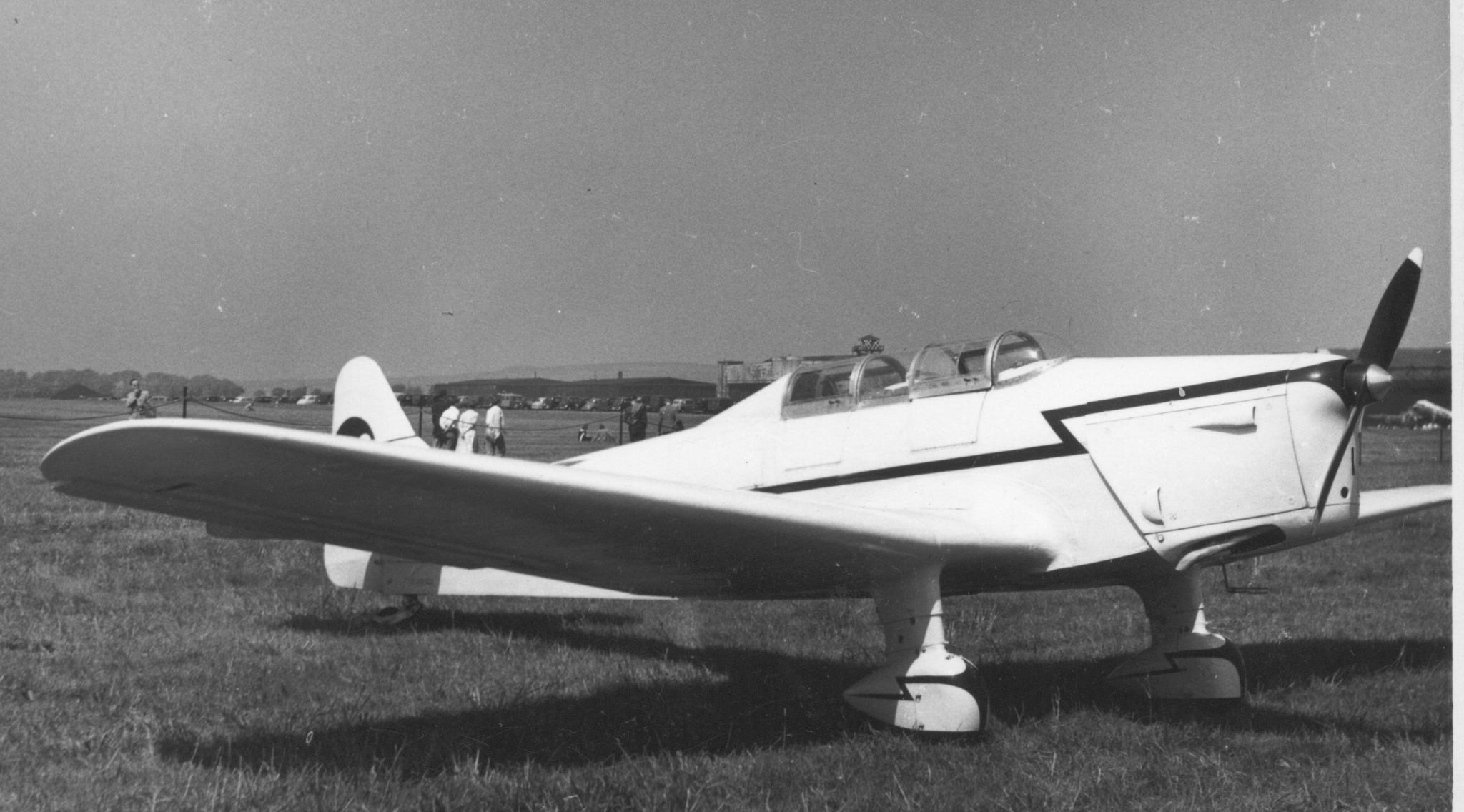
Hawk Trainer Coupe G-AJRT at Leeds (Yeadon) Airport in May 1955

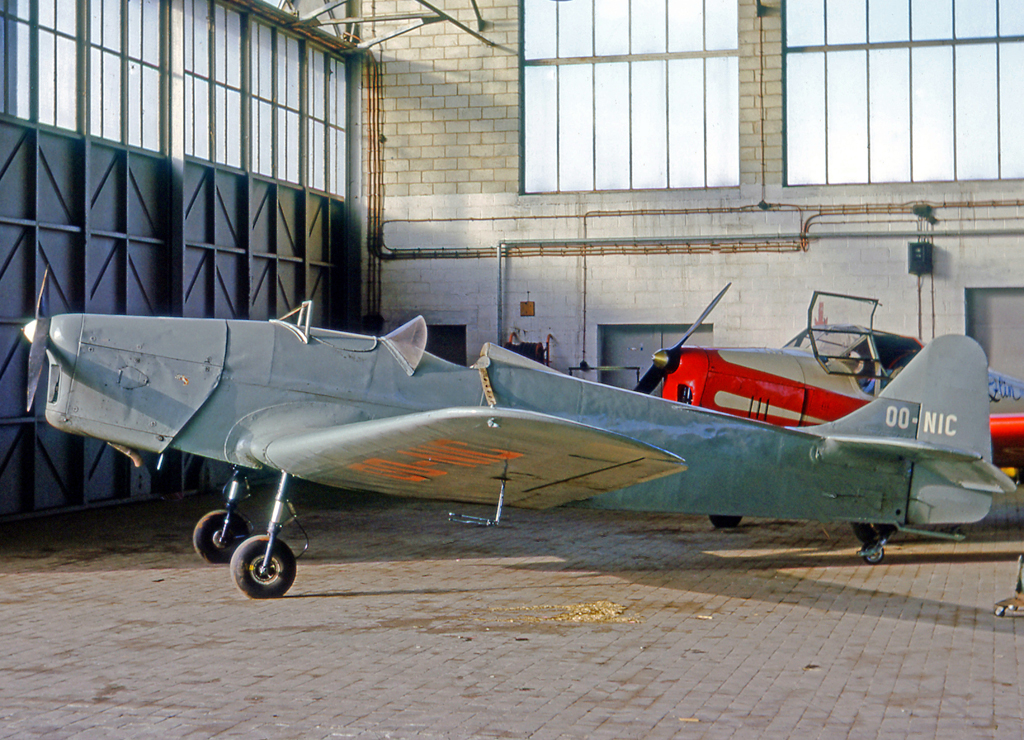
Many Magisters were exported postwar, this example being registered in Belgium.

The Magister also participated in experimental wartime research, such as to evaluate a long range ground attack platform during 1941. Seeking to increase the payloads of conventional medium bombers, British military planners suggested the use of a so-called 'auxiliary wing' that could be towed like a glider behind a bomber; this wing would be loaded with either additional fuel or munitions. To test this concept, a modified Magister was produced; by the time testing had reached an advanced stage, the RAF had significantly bolstered its offensive forces with heavy bombers, removing the need to deploy the auxiliary wing concept. Other aircraft received experimental modifications to evaluate new equipment or aerodynamic features.

Following the end of the conflict, large numbers of Magisters were disposed of, leading to many being converted for civilian use. Such aircraft were renamed the Hawk Trainer III. Amongst its civil uses was air racing; during the 1950 Kings Cup Air Race alone, eight Hawk Trainer IIIs were entered, one of which (a modified cabin version G-AKRV), piloted by E. Day, was awarded first place, having achieved a recorded speed of 138.5 mph while doing so. At least two other aircraft were thus modified.

During the postwar years, many Magisters were exported to overseas customers, including private pilot owners and flying clubs. Countries that purchased the type included Argentina, Australia, Belgium, Denmark, Egypt, France, Iceland, Ireland, Italy, Kenya, Lebanon, Morocco, New Zealand, Portugal, South Africa, Thailand and Tunisia.

== Variants ==
Miles M.14 Magister / Hawk Trainer III
Initial production version.
Miles M.14A Magister I / Hawk Trainer III
Improved variant.
Miles M.14B Magister II / Hawk Trainer II
Improved variant with a 135 hp (100 kW) Blackburn Cirrus II engine

Hawk Trainer III

B.F.7
(Thai: บ.ฝ.๗) Royal Thai Armed Forces designation for the Magister I.

== Operators ==
Australia

- Royal Australian Air Force – One Magister Mk.I purchased in 1938 for comparison with de Havilland Tiger Moth in the basic trainer role

Canada
Royal Canadian Air Force
Egypt

- Egyptian Army Air Force
- Royal Egyptian Air Force – 42 aircraft.

Belgium

- Belgian Air Force – One aircraft operated from 1946 to 1948.

Estonia

- Estonian Air Force – One aircraft

Ireland

- Irish Air Corps – 27 aircraft from 1939 to 1952.

Latvia

- Latvian Aviation Regiment

Malaya

- Malayan Volunteer Air Force

New Zealand

- Royal New Zealand Air Force – Two aircraft.
  - No. 1 Squadron RNZAF
  - No. 42 Squadron RNZAF

Portugal

- Portuguese Air Force – Ten aircraft.

South Africa

- South African Air Force

Turkey

- Turkish Air Force

Thailand

- Thai Air Force
- Thai Navy

United Kingdom

- Fleet Air Arm
- Royal Air Force
  - No. 24 Squadron RAF
  - No. 81 Squadron RAF
  - No. 173 Squadron RAF
  - No. 267 Squadron RAF

== Surviving aircraft ==
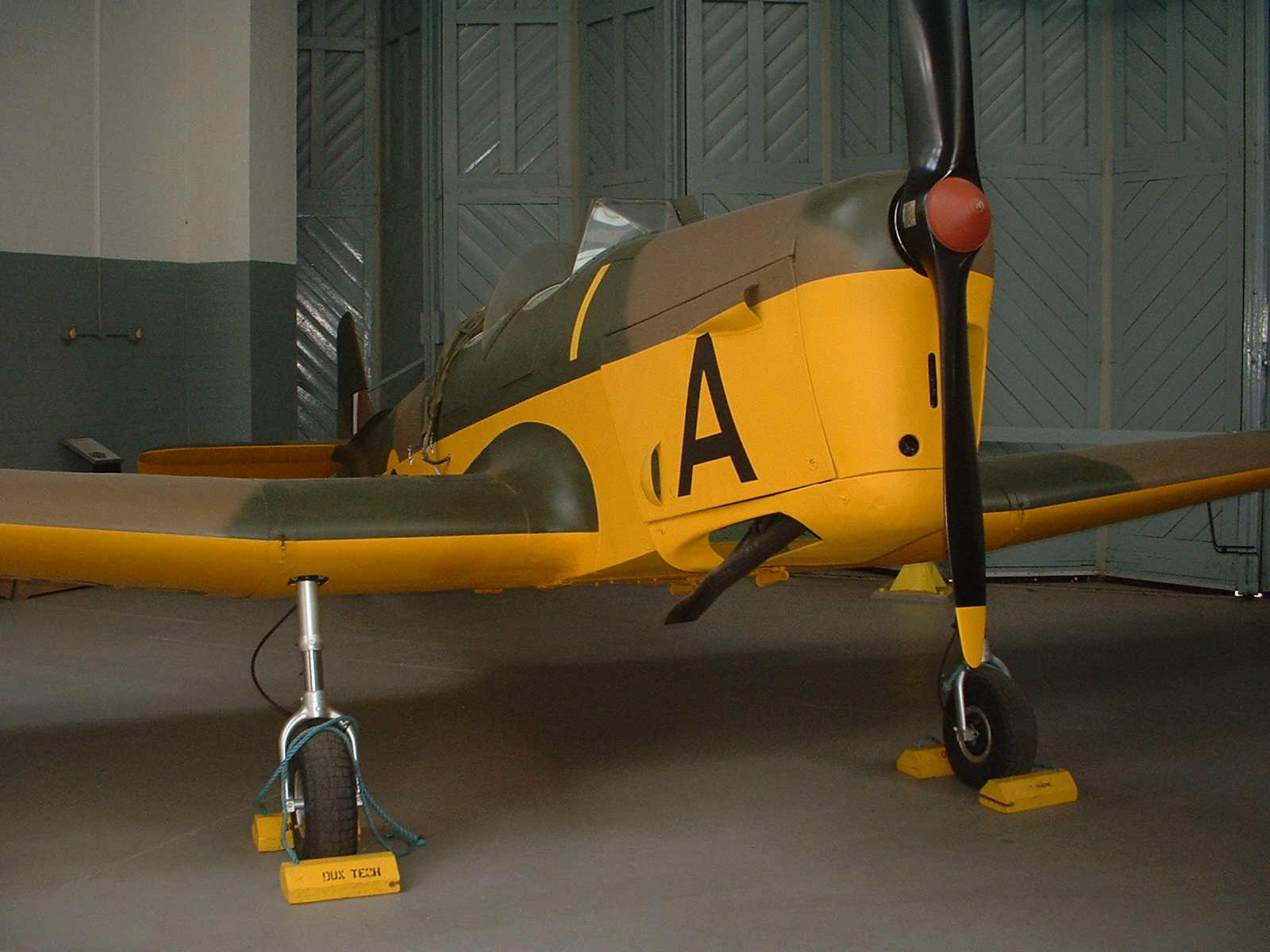
Miles Magister at the Imperial War Museum, Duxford

By 2009, ten Hawk Trainer IIIs were registered in the United Kingdom, of which several were airworthy. Furthermore, several ex-service Magisters have been preserved and on display – including an ex-RAF example at the Imperial War Museum in the UK, and an ex-Irish Air Corps example at the National Museum of Ireland in Dublin.

G-CLHY is restored and operated by R.A.F. Station Czechoslovakia at Podhořany airport, in the Pardubice region of the Czech Republic.

ZK-AWY is preserved in the Museum of Transport and Technology, New Zealand.

TC-KAY is preserved in the Turkish Air Force Museum.

== Specifications (Miles M.14A) ==
Data from Miles Aircraft since 1925,

General characteristics

- Crew: 2
- Length: 24 ft 7.5 in (7.506 m)
- Wingspan: 33 ft 10 in (10.31 m)
- Height: 6 ft 8 in (2.03 m)
- Wing area: 176 sq ft (16.4 m^{2})
- Airfoil: root: Clark YH mod (19%); tip: Clark YH mod (9%)
- Empty weight: 1,286 lb (583 kg)
- Gross weight: 1,900 lb (862 kg) normal

1,845 lb (837 kg) for aerobatics

- Fuel capacity: 21.5 imp gal (25.8 US gal; 98 L); oil 2.5 imp gal (3.0 US gal; 11 L)
- Powerplant: 1 × de Havilland Gipsy Major I four cylinder air-cooled inverted in-line piston engine, 130 hp (97 kW)
- Propellers: 2-bladed fixed-pitch propeller

Performance

- Maximum speed: 142 mph (229 km/h, 123 kn) at 1,000 ft (300 m)

140 mph (122 kn; 225 km/h) at sea level
130 mph (113 kn; 209 km/h) at 5,000 ft (1,500 m)
125 mph (109 kn; 201 km/h) at 10,000 ft (3,000 m)

- Cruise speed: 122 mph (196 km/h, 106 kn)
- Stall speed: 43 mph (69 km/h, 37 kn) flaps down

52 mph (45 kn; 84 km/h) flaps up

- Range: 367 mi (591 km, 319 nmi)
- Endurance: 3 hours
- Service ceiling: 16,500 ft (5,000 m) * Absolute ceiling: 19,000 ft (5,800 m)
- Rate of climb: 850 ft/min (4.3 m/s)
- Wing loading: 10.7 lb/sq ft (52 kg/m^{2})
- Take-off run: 630 ft (190 m) in 5 mph (4 kn; 8 km/h) wind
- Take-off distance to 50 ft (15 m): 1,200 ft (370 m) in 5 mph (4 kn; 8 km/h) wind
- Landing run: 420 ft (130 m) in 5 mph (4 kn; 8 km/h) wind
- Landing distance from 50 ft (15 m): 975 ft (300 m) in 5 mph (4 kn; 8 km/h) wind

== See also ==
Related development

- Miles Hawk Major
- THK-15

Aircraft of comparable role, configuration, and era

- Caudron C.600 Aiglon
- de Havilland Moth Minor
- Fairchild PT-19
- Ikarus Aero 2
- Klemm Kl 35
- PTO-4
- RWD 23
- Valmet Tuuli
- Yakovlev UT-2

Related lists

- List of aircraft of the Royal Air Force
- List of aircraft of the Royal New Zealand Air Force and Royal New Zealand Navy
