= Miles M.2 Hawk Trainer =

M.2 Hawk Trainer
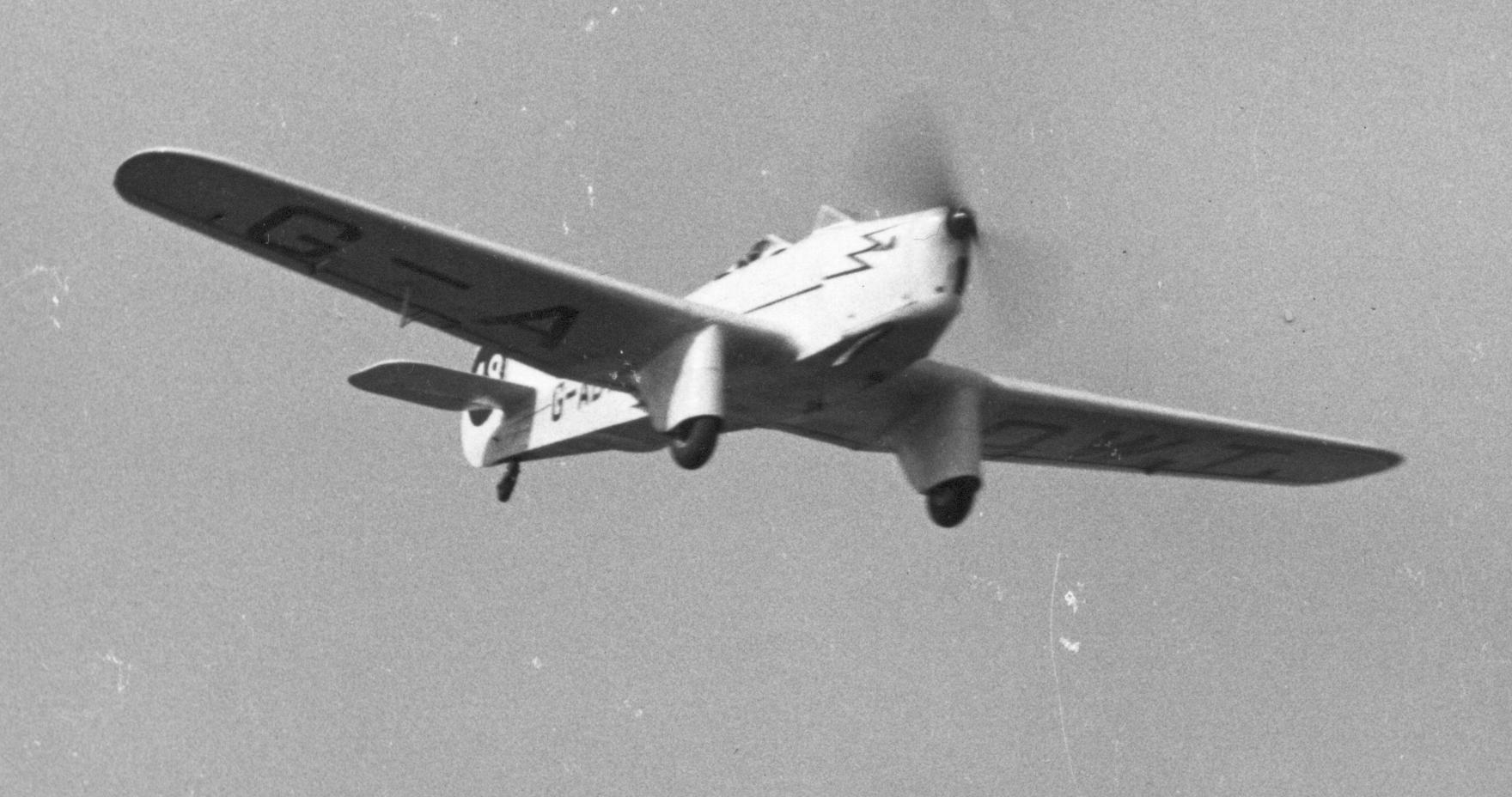
- Miles M.2W Hawk Trainer G-ADWT racing at Leeds (Yeadon) airport in May 1955

General information
- Type: Two-seat touring and racing monoplane
- Manufacturer: Miles Aircraft Limited
- Designer: Frederick George Miles
- Primary users: Royal Air Force Romanian Air Force
- Number built: 27

History
- First flight: 1935
- Developed from: Miles Hawk Major
- Developed into: Miles Magister

The Miles Hawk Trainer was a 1930s British two-seat training monoplane designed by Miles Aircraft Limited.

== Design and development ==
The Miles Hawk Trainer was developed from the Hawk Major to meet a requirement to supplement the de Havilland Tiger Moth in the training role. The aircraft had dual controls, blind flying equipment and vacuum operated flaps.

Based on the attributes of the Trainer, the Air Ministry issued Specification T.40/36, which led directly to the Miles Magister.

== Variants ==
M.2W Hawk Trainer
Initial production version powered by a de Havilland Gipsy Major engine, four built.
M.2X Hawk Trainer
Improved version with a larger horn-balanced rudder, nine built.
M.2Y Hawk Trainer
M.2X with minor changes, 13 built.

- Note that Hawk Trainer Mk II and Mk III were variants of the Miles Magister.

== Operators ==
Romania

- Royal Romanian Air Force

United Kingdom

- Royal Air Force

Spain

- Spanish Republican Air Force

== Surviving aircraft ==
- M.2W registered G-ADWT is still flyable and based in England

== Specifications (M.2W) ==
Data from British Civil Aircraft 1919–1972: Volume 3

General characteristics

- Capacity: Two
- Length: 24 ft 0 in (7.32 m)
- Wingspan: 34 ft 0 in (10.36 m)
- Height: 6 ft 8 in (2.03 m)
- Wing area: 176 sq ft (16.4 m^{2})
- Empty weight: 1,210 lb (549 kg)
- Gross weight: 1,720 lb (780 kg)
- Powerplant: 1 × de Havilland Gipsy Major , 130 hp (97 kW)

Performance

- Maximum speed: 150 mph (240 km/h, 130 kn)
- Cruise speed: 135 mph (217 km/h, 117 kn)
- Range: 400 mi (640 km, 350 nmi)
- Service ceiling: 18,000 ft (5,500 m)
- Rate of climb: 1,300 ft/min (6.6 m/s)

== See also ==
Aircraft of comparable role, configuration, and era

- González Gil-Pazó GP-1

Related lists

- List of aircraft of the Royal Air Force
- List of aircraft of the Spanish Republican Air Force
