= Hucks starter =

Aircraft piston engine starting vehicle

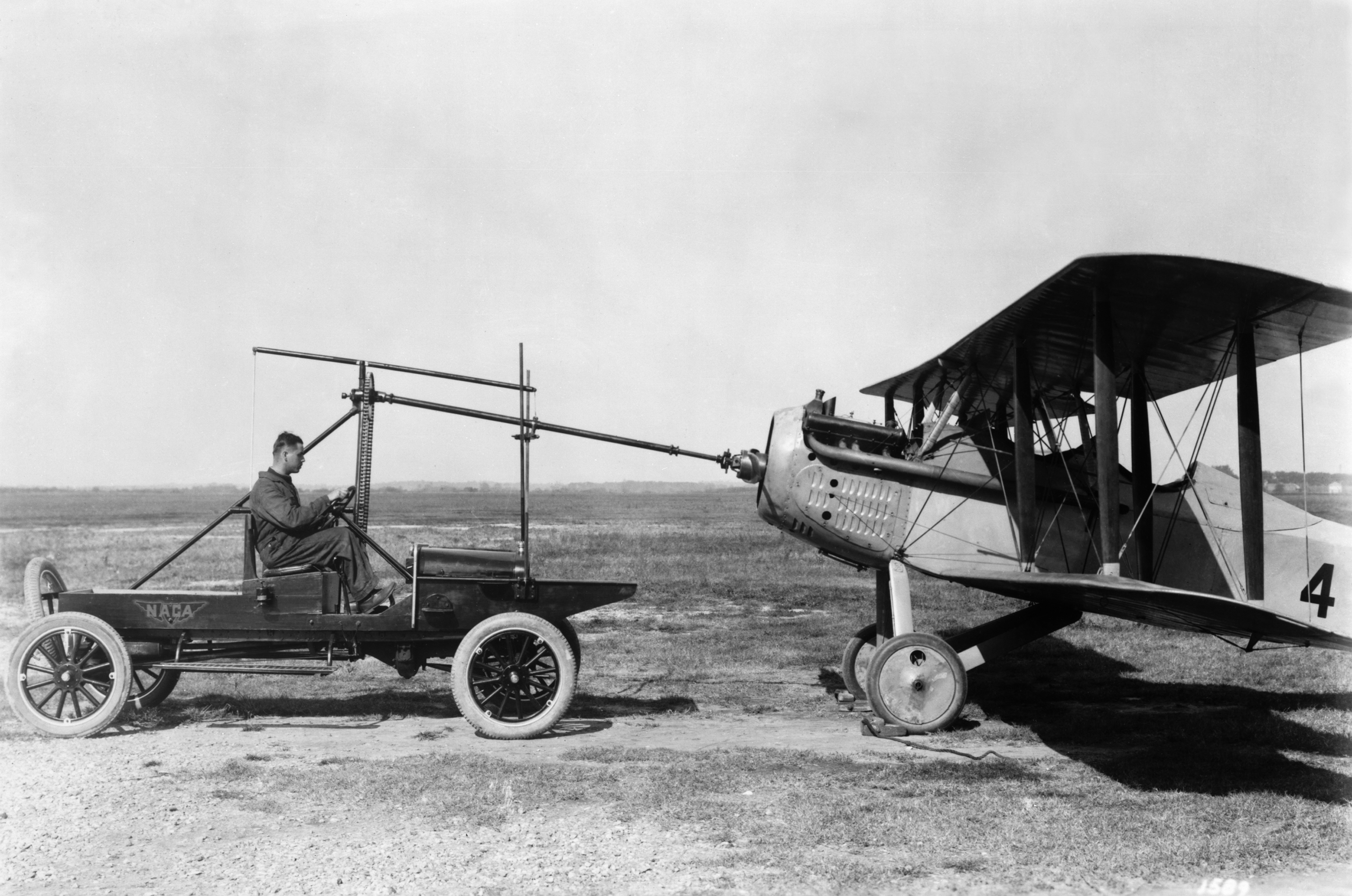
A NACA Hucks starter set up to start a Vought VE-7

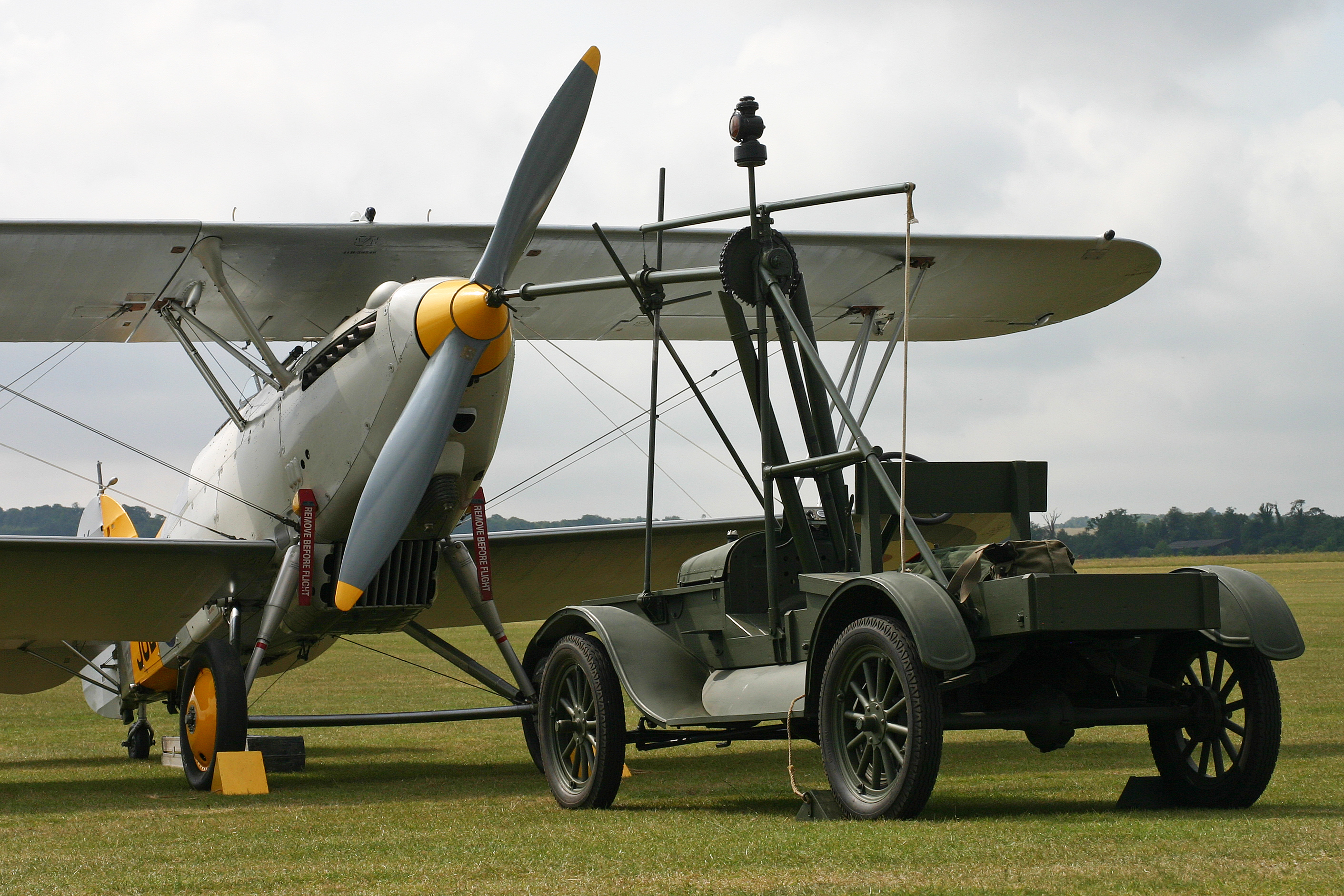
A Hucks starter connected to start the engine of a Hawker Nimrod

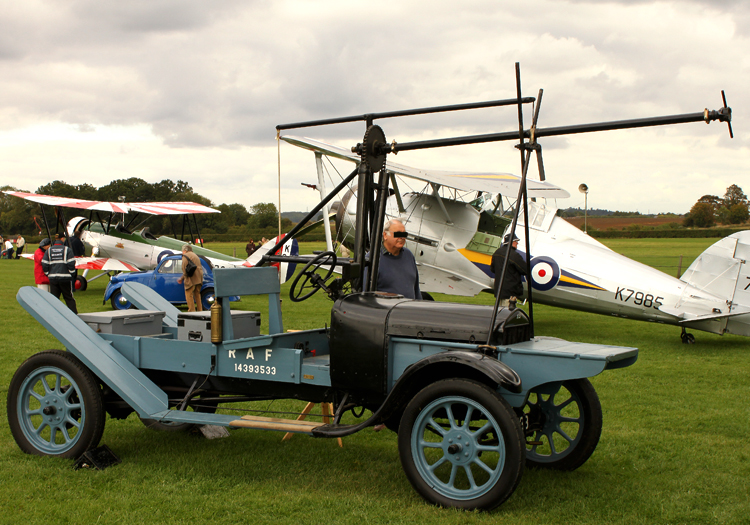
A Ford Model T-based Hucks starter owned by the Shuttleworth Collection

A Hucks starter is an auxiliary power unit, almost always a lorry or truck, that provides initial power to start up piston aircraft engines. Invented by Royal Flying Corps Captain Bentfield Hucks, for whom it is named, the device served as a mechanical replacement for the groundcrew members who would have otherwise needed to spin an aircraft's propeller by hand as a part of the starting process, on aircraft engines not fitted with starters.

Throughout the 1920s and 1930s, the Hucks starter was in widespread use amongst ground crews, becoming particularly useful as aircraft engines had progressively become too large to be easily started by hand. Some aircraft could be started practically only by using the device. Its popularity quickly waned during the 1930s as new forms of integral starters, such as the Coffman starter, were introduced to service. While many Hucks starters were scrapped, a number have been restored and preserved for display. During the 2010s, one such preserved example, held in the Shuttleworth Collection, was restored to working order and became the first Hucks starter to actually start an aircraft in 70 years.

== Operation ==
The power is transmitted to the aircraft via a power take-off shaft, much like those used to run winches on tow trucks, or on agricultural machinery. The shaft of the starter fits into a special protruding hub incorporating a simple projecting claw clutch on the center of the airplane's propeller assembly. When engaged, the power of the truck's engine is transmitted to the aircraft engine until start up, whereupon the faster speed of the now-running aircraft engine disengages the clutch, and then the starter truck clears the area prior to take-off. The system presented several advantages over conventional hand-starting, being considerably less hazardous to ground personnel, requiring only two personnel to operate it, and was able to start an engine from cold within the space of 30 seconds. In comparison, hand-cranking to start engines was time-consuming and often difficult outside of ideal conditions.

The device's name comes from its inventor, Bentfield Hucks, who was a captain in the Royal Flying Corps (RFC) at the time. Early production of the Hucks starter was performed by the British aircraft manufacturer Airco. The Hucks starter was introduced to Royal Air Force service in the months following the Armistice of 11 November 1918, which had effectively brought the conflict to an end.

The RAF's Hucks starter fleet were typically based on Ford Model T trucks, which were already in widespread use and familiar to ground crews. Reportedly, ground crews developed a definitive preference for the Hucks starter over various other means of starting engines. Various period aircraft in RAF service, such as the Hawker Fury biplane, lacked an electric starter, being practically dependent on the presence of the Hucks starter to start their engines. The Royal Canadian Air Force (RCAF) also made extensive use of Hucks starters; they were particularly needed by aircraft such as those Avro 504s that had been reengined with the Armstrong-Siddeley Lynx. Various other operators throughout the British Commonwealth and around the world also adopted the device; NACA (the predecessor to NASA) were one known user of the Hucks starter.

During the latter half of the 1930s, the popularity of the Hucks starter diminished rapidly as a new generation of engines furnished with integral electric starters arrived in quantity in the buildup to the Second World War. Many of the devices are believed to have been scrapped at this time, metal being a particularly valuable wartime commodity. Despite being largely considered to be obsolete, a number of wartime aircraft, such as the Soviet Air Force's Ilyushin Il-2 ground-attack aircraft, were outfitted to use Hucks starters.

One original Hucks starter, built during 1920 by de Havilland, is known to survive at the Shuttleworth Collection in Bedfordshire; during the 2010s, it became the first Hucks Starter to actually start an aircraft in 70 years when it successfully started a preserved Hawker Hind. The Shuttleworth's unit has since been regularly used to start the vintage aircraft based there, while a number of working reproductions have also been built, based on original Ford Model T chassis. The RAF Museum London has a restored example, comprised both of original pieces from multiple vehicles and new-build bodywork, on permanent display.

== See also ==
- Aircraft engine starting
