= Marot-Gardon =

Marot-Gardon (English: /mɑːˈroʊ ɡɑːrˈdɒ̃/ mah-ROH-gar-DOHN, French: [maʁo ɡaʁdɔ̃]) was a French automobile manufacturer, between 1899 and 1904. The company, based in Corbie, began with the manufacture of racing tricycles, but by 1900 had progressed to the construction of a 4½ cv "miniature carriage".

== Vehicles ==
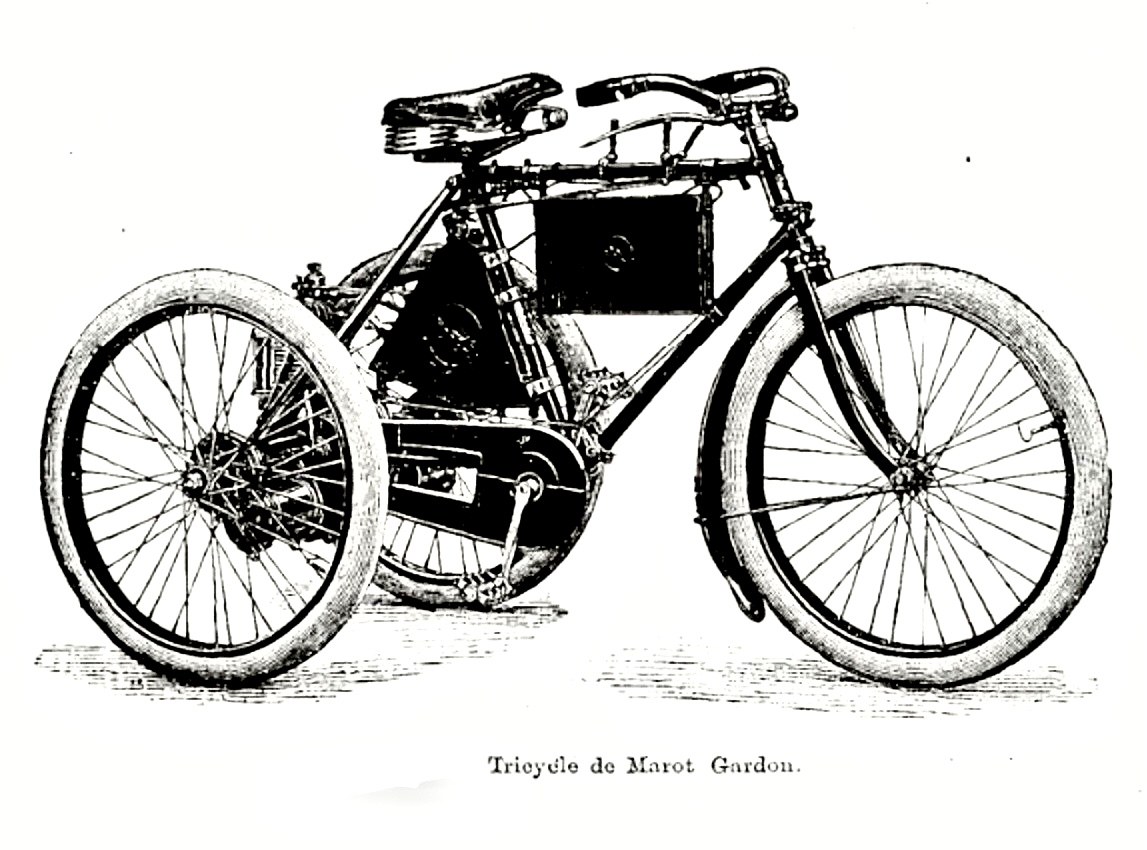
Marot-Gardon tricycle (1899)

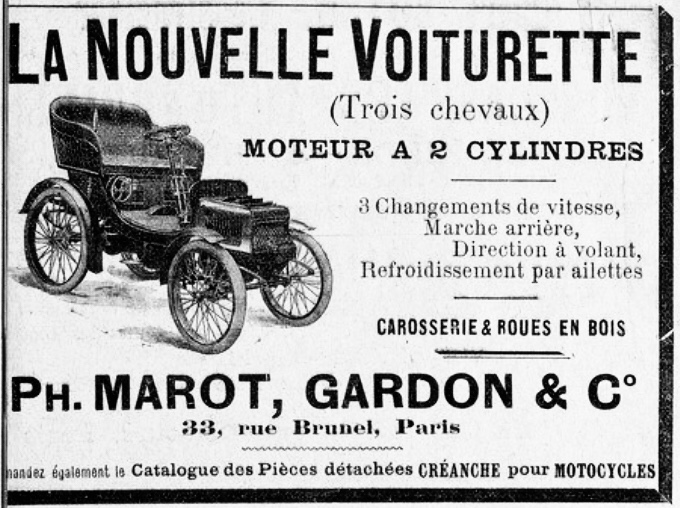
Ph. Marot, Gardon et Cie Voiturette (1899)

Initially, three-wheeled tricycles and four-wheelers were produced. In 1899 a small rear Tonneau car appeared with a single-cylinder engine with 3 hp and a three speed gearbox. In 1900 the engine output rose to 4.5 hp. By 1901, the range consisted of a model with a front engine, 6 hp and chain drive, as well as a racing car with a built-in engine from Soncin in the rear, which made 7 hp.

A tricycle by Marot-Gardon can be viewed at the Shuttleworth Collection in Biggleswade. Another tricycle is at the Belgrade Automobile Museum.

Perhaps the only surviving drivable four-wheel Marot-Gardon lives in Lake Worth Beach (Palm Beach County), Florida and was exhibited at the 2025 Wheels Across the Pond show in Jupiter, Florida.

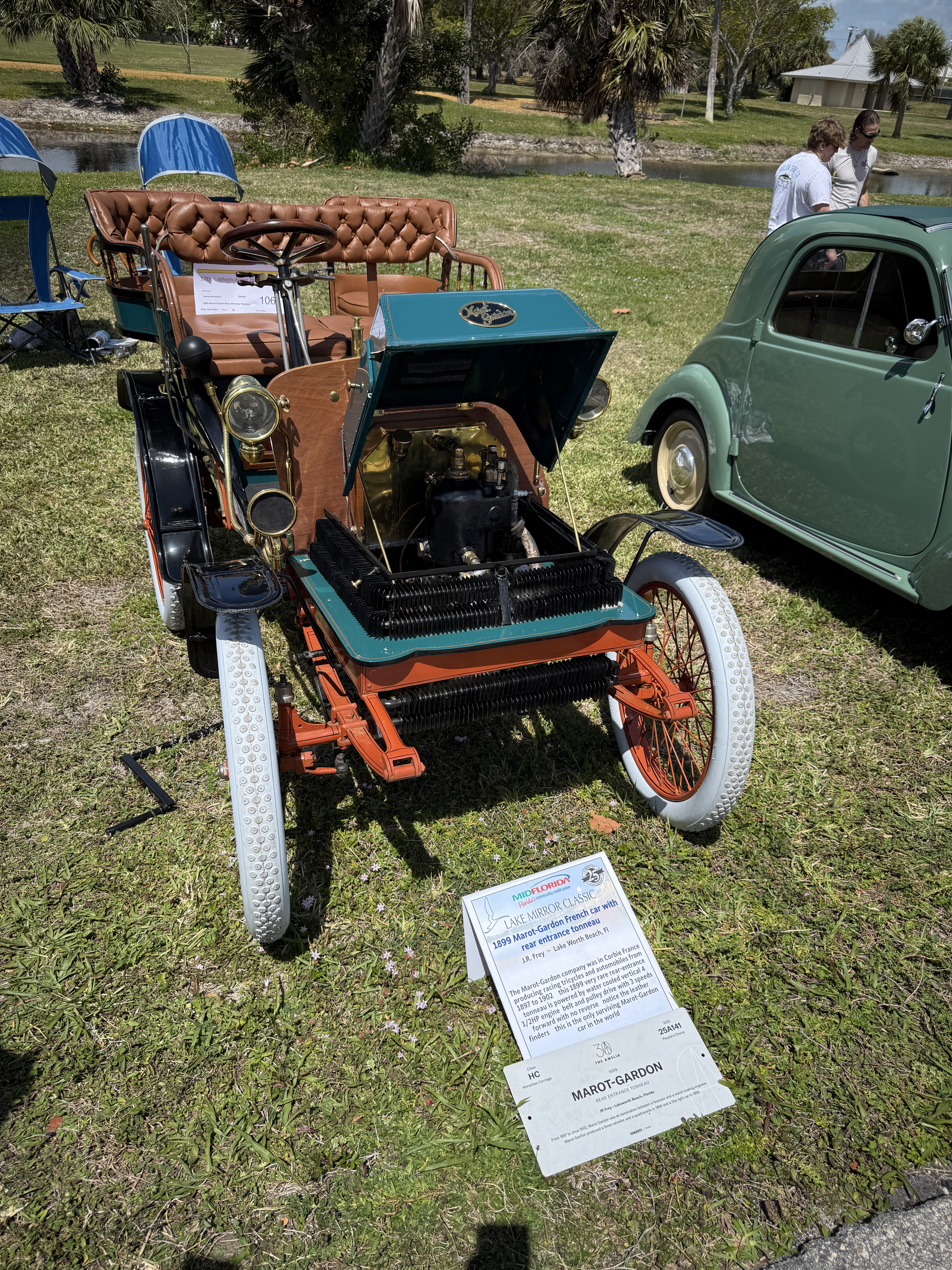
1899 Marot-Gardon in Jupiter, Florida
