= Miles Hawk Major =

1930s British monoplane

Hawk Major
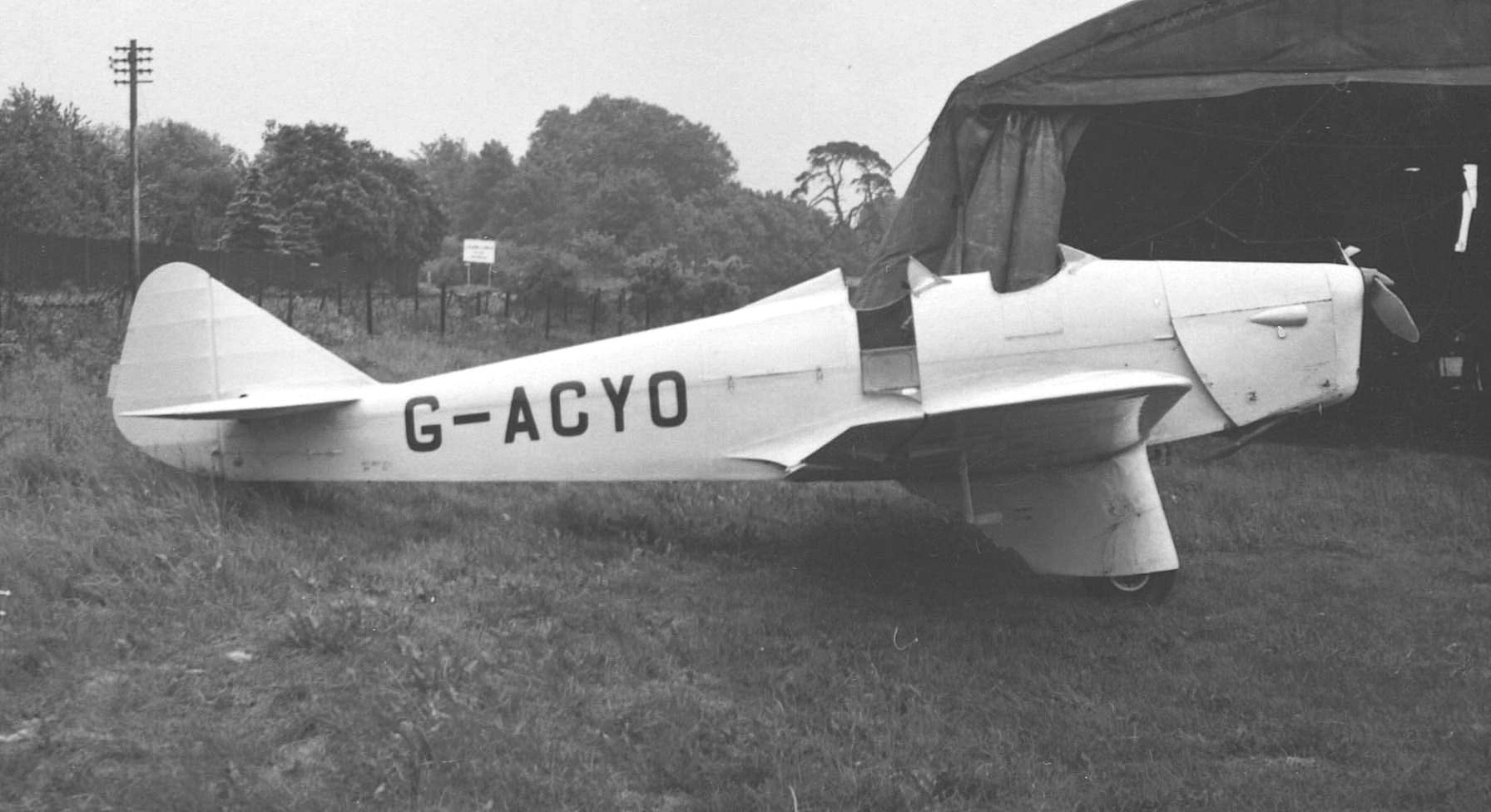
- Miles M.2H Hawk Major at White Waltham Airfield, near Maidenhead Berkshire, in June 1953

General information
- Type: Two-seat touring and racing monoplane
- Manufacturer: Miles Aircraft Limited
- Designer: Frederick George Miles
- Primary user: Royal Air Force
- Number built: 64

History
- First flight: 1934
- Developed from: Miles Hawk
- Variants: Miles Hawk Speed Six; Miles Hawk Trainer
- Developed into: Miles Sparrowhawk

The Miles Hawk Major was a 1930s British two-seat light monoplane, developed by Miles Aircraft from the Miles Hawk in order to take advantage of the new inverted de Havilland Gipsy Major engine. When fitted with the longer Gipsy Six in place of the forward crew member, it was known as the Miles Hawk Speed Six.

== Design and development ==
The Hawk Major was a variant of the Miles M.2 Hawk, developed by F.G. Miles to take advantage of the new inverted de Havilland Gipsy Major engine. Other changes included metal (instead of wood) engine mounts and streamlined undercarriage. The production Hawk Major had the 130 hp de Havilland Gipsy Major engine. The aircraft sold well to private owners, including two that were fitted with smoke generators to allow them to be used as skywriters. An improved version (the M.2H) with a trailing edge flap replaced the M.2F on the production line. A number of special one-off racing versions were also built.

== Operational history ==
The prototype M.2F Hawk Major) was first flown in 1934 and went on to second place in the 1934 King's Cup air race at an average speed of 147.78 mph.

In October 1934, Squadron Leader Malcolm Charles McGregor flew a Hawk Major from RAF Mildenhall to Melbourne, Australia in 7 days, 15 hours while competing in the MacRobertson Air Race.

== Variants ==
M.2F Hawk Major
Production version powered by a de Havilland Gipsy Major engine.
M.2G Hawk Major
Three-seat cabin version, one built.
M.2H Hawk Major
Production version powered by a de Havilland Gipsy Major engine.
M.2K Hawk Major
Powered by a 105 hp Cirrus Hermes II engine, one built.
M.2M Hawk Major
Three-seat version powered by a de Havilland Gipsy Major engine, two built.
M.2P Hawk Major
Dual control version powered by a de Havilland Gipsy Major engine, three built.
M.2R Hawk Major de Luxe
Racing version powered by a de Havilland Gipsy Major engine, two built.
M.2S
Long-range version Powered by a 150 hp Blackburn Cirrus Major engine.
M.2T
Long-range single-seater powered by 150 hp Blackburn Cirrus Major engine, two built.

=== Hawk Speed Six ===
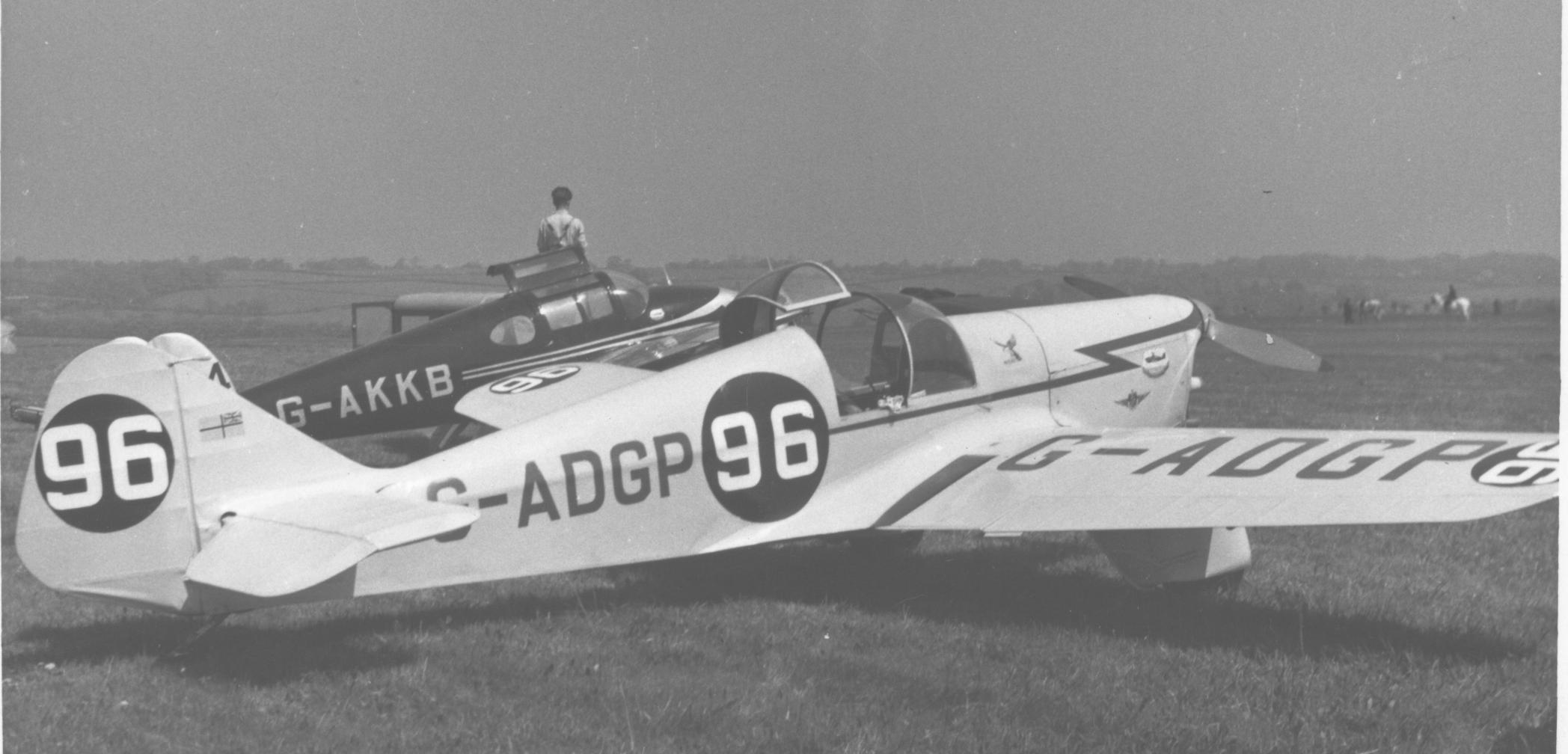
Hawk Speed Six G-ADGP wearing race No. 96 at Leeds (Yeadon) Airport in May 1955.

A racing version was developed with a 200 hp de Havilland Gipsy Six engine. To make room for the longer, six-cylinder engine the front cockpit was removed, making it a single-seater, and the rear cockpit was repositioned to retain balance. The type became known as the Miles Hawk Speed Six.

Only three were built, each tailored to the buyer's requirements, but they had a significant impact on the Golden Age of British air racing.

=== Hawk Trainer ===
In 1935, an improved version for training use was developed as the Miles Hawk Trainer.

== Surviving aircraft ==
- M.2H Hawk Major registered G-ADAS and flying from Museu TAM, São Carlos, São Paulo, Brazil. This is the only Hawk major in flying condition.
- M.2H Hawk Major (DG590) (Civilian Registration was G-ADMW) at Montrose Air Station Museum, Montrose, Angus, Scotland.
- M.2L Speed Six G-ADGP is airworthy in 2020 and in the Shuttleworth Collection based at Old Warden.

== Operators ==
United Kingdom

- Royal Air Force

Spain

- Aeronáutica Militar

== Specifications (M.2F) ==
Data from Miles Aircraft since 1925

General characteristics

- Capacity: Two
- Length: 24 ft 0 in (7.32 m)
- Wingspan: 33 ft 0 in (10.06 m)
- Height: 6 ft 8 in (2.03 m)
- Wing area: 169 sq ft (15.7 m^{2})
- Empty weight: 1,150 lb (522 kg)
- Gross weight: 1,800 lb (816 kg)
- Powerplant: 1 × de Havilland Gipsy Major , 200 hp (150 kW)

Performance

- Maximum speed: 150 mph (240 km/h, 130 kn)
- Cruise speed: 135 mph (217 km/h, 117 kn)
- Range: 560 mi (900 km, 490 nmi)
- Service ceiling: 20,000 ft (6,100 m)
- Rate of climb: 1,080 ft/min (5.5 m/s)

== See also ==
Related lists

- List of aircraft of the Royal Air Force
