= B. C. Hucks =

British aviator (1884–1918)

Captain B. C. Hucks
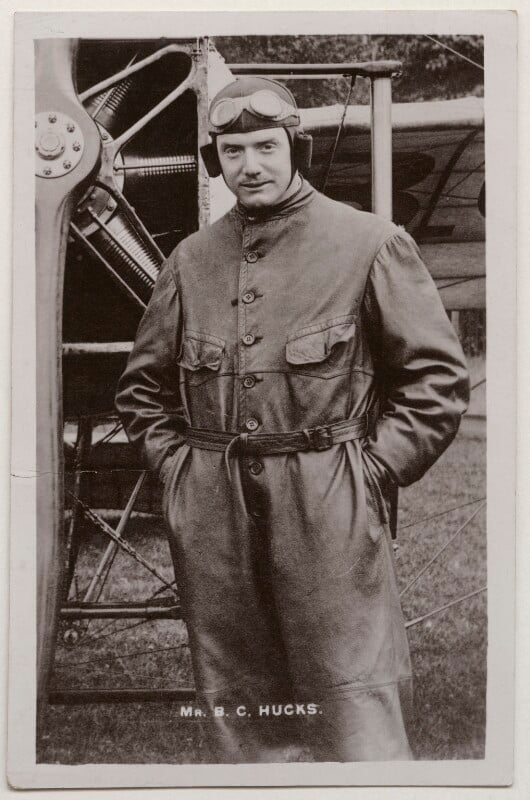
- Hucks in the 1910s
- Born: Bentfield Charles Hucks; 25 October 1884; Stansted, Essex, England
- Died: 7 November 1918 (aged 34); Bourne End, Wooburn, Buckinghamshire, England
- Resting place: Highgate Cemetery
- Aviation career
- Flight license: May 1911
- Rank: Captain

Bentfield Charles Hucks (25 October 1884 – 7 November 1918) was an aviation innovator in the early 20th century. As well as test flying numerous aircraft types, he was the first Briton to perform a loop in an aircraft, which he performed in his Blériot at Hendon airfield in September 1913. He is also credited with the Hucks starter and many feats of test flying during the First World War, while working at Hendon for Airco.

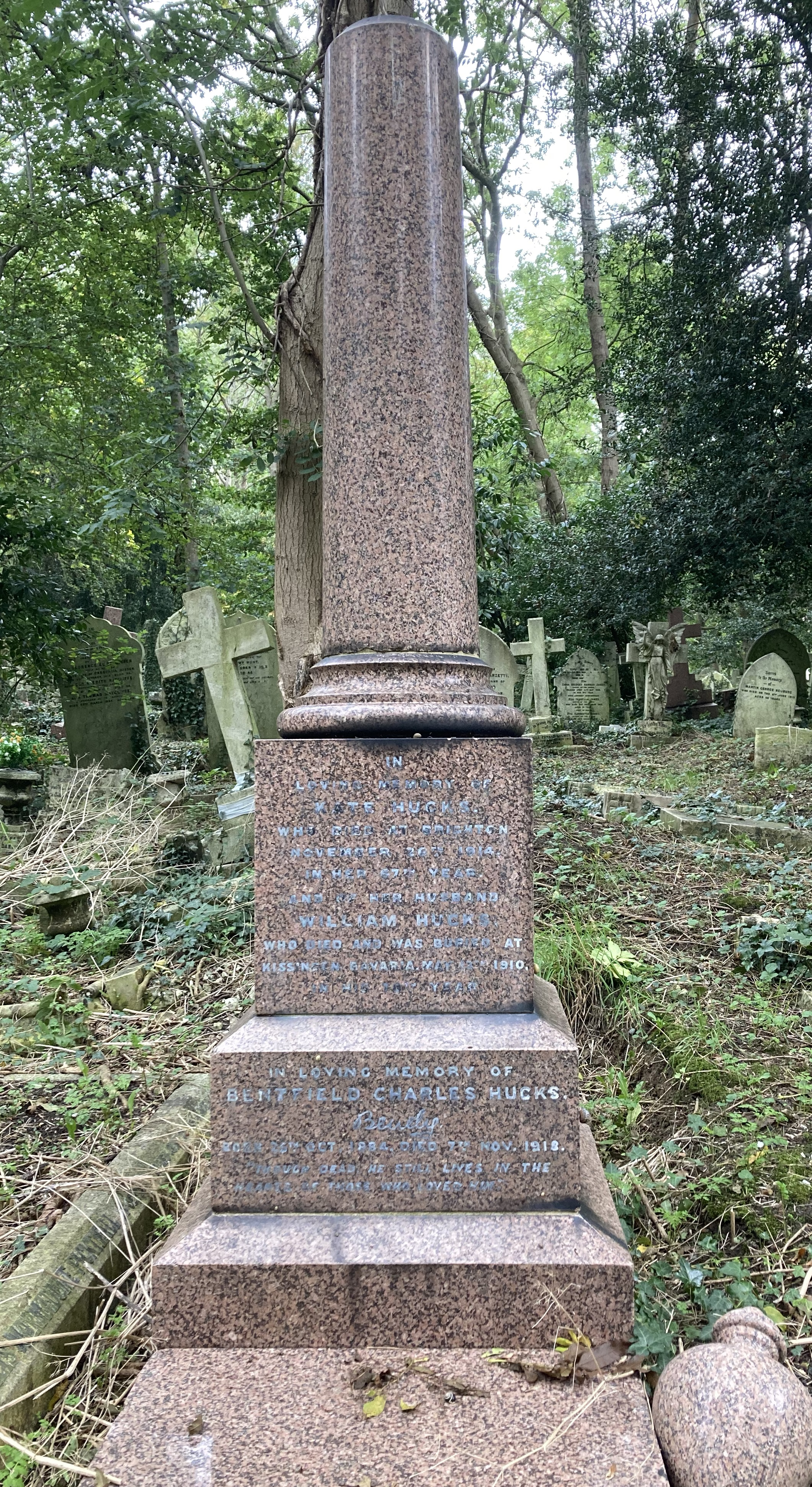
Grave of Bentfield Charles Hucks in Highgate Cemetery

== Life ==
Hucks was born on 25 October 1884 at Bentfield End, Stansted, Essex the son of William and Kate Hucks. Hucks gained his Royal Aero Club certificate (number 91) in May, 1911, flying a Blackburn monoplane. He joined the Royal Flying Corps (RFC) when war broke out in August, 1914, and was sent to the Western Front. But he was sent home invalid after an attack of pleurisy before working as a test pilot at Hendon, north-west London.

He died on 7 November 1918, just days before the end of the First World War, of double pneumonia. He was buried on the eastern side of Highgate Cemetery.
