= Shuttleworth Collection =

Aviation museum in Old Warden, Bedfordshire, England

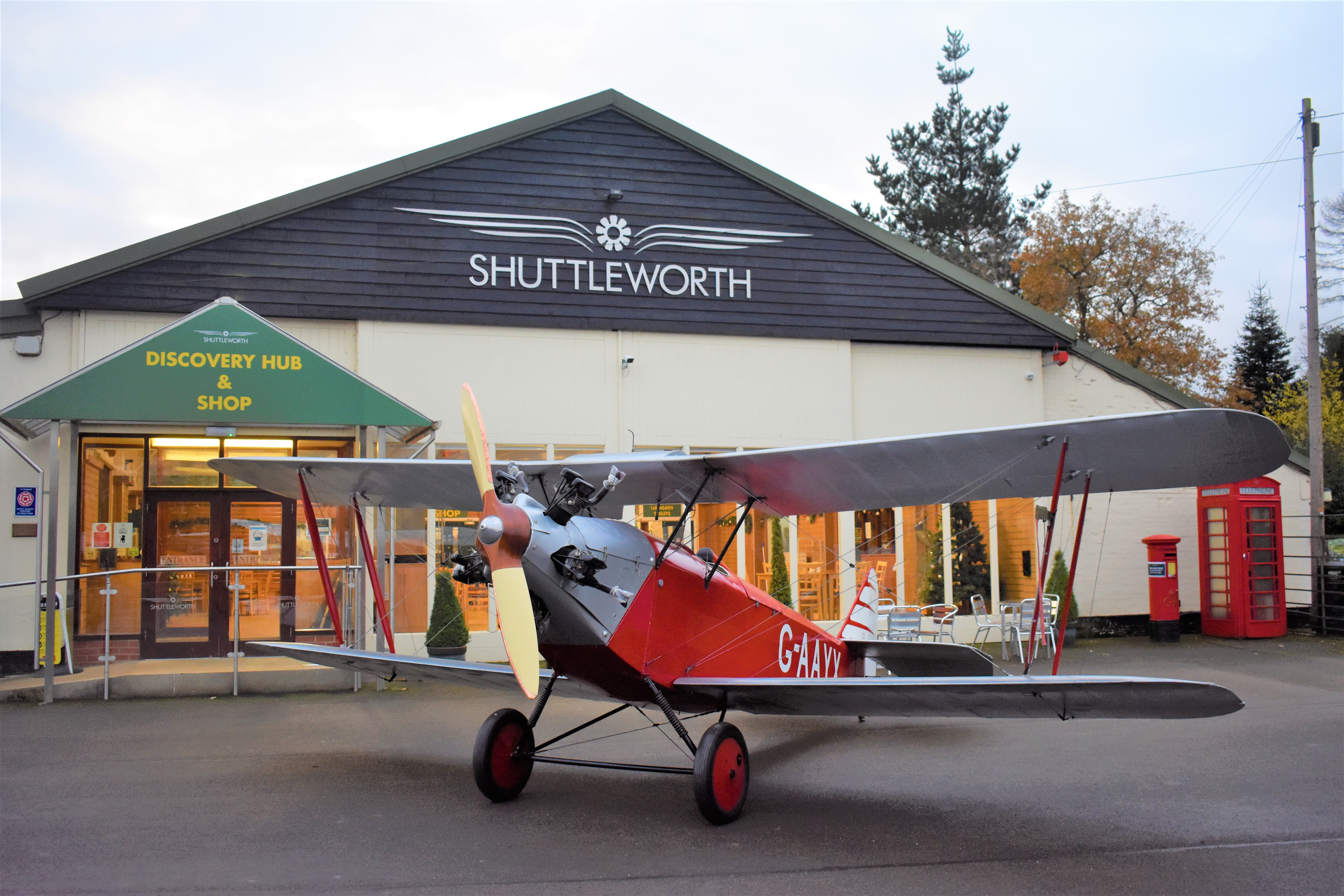
- The Shuttleworth Collection's Discovery Hub in December 2021, with its Southern Martlet outside.

- Location within Bedfordshire
- Established: 1928
- Location: Old Warden, Bedfordshire
- Coordinates: 52°05′22″N 00°19′21″W
- Type: Aviation museum
- Website: www.shuttleworth.org

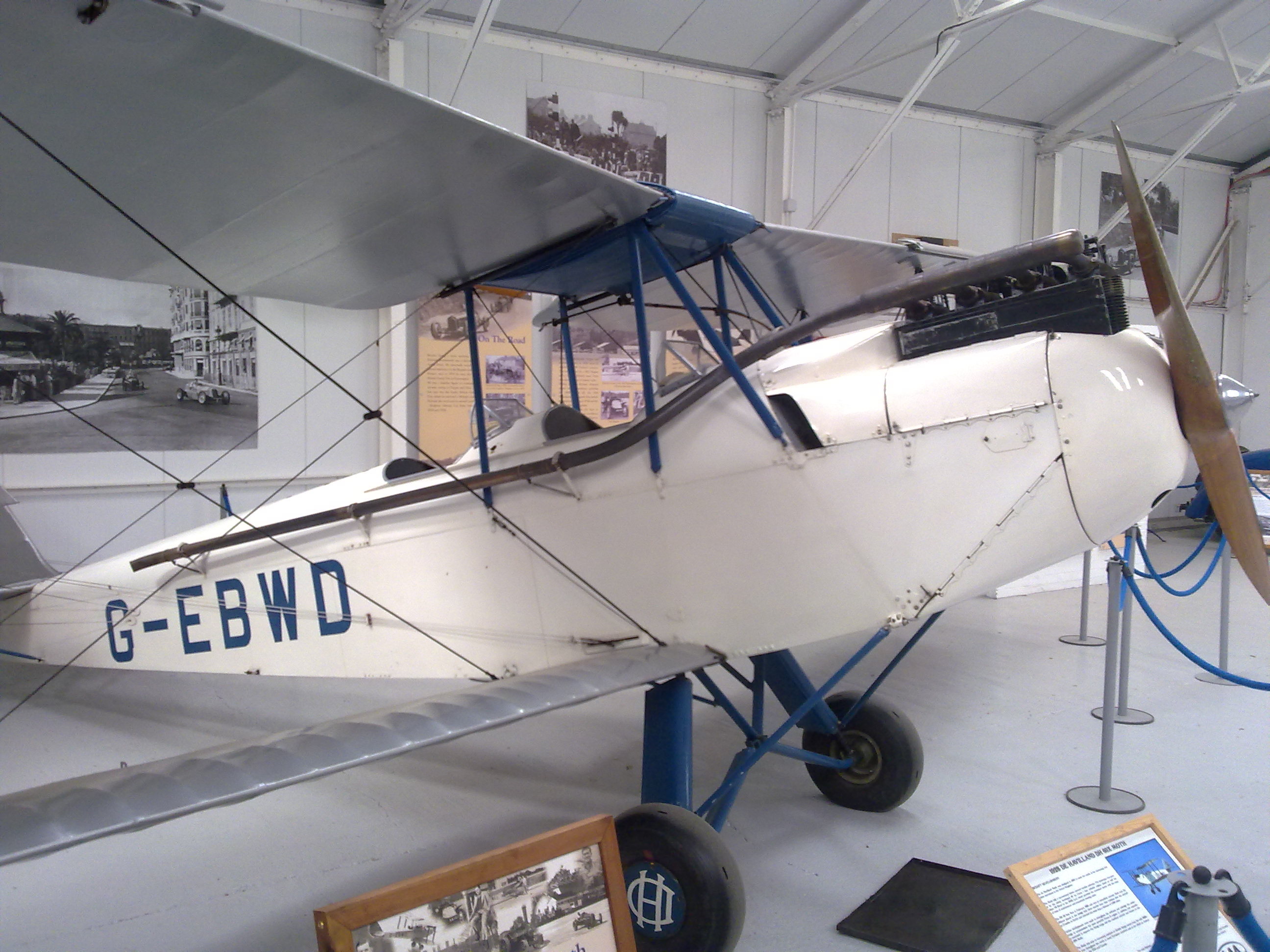
de Havilland DH.60X Hermes Moth, G-EBWD, which flies regularly during displays at the Shuttleworth Collection

The Shuttleworth Collection is a working aviation, automotive and agricultural collection located at Old Warden Aerodrome in Bedfordshire, England.

== History ==
The collection was founded in 1928 by aviator Richard Ormonde Shuttleworth.He died when his Fairey Battle crashed at night on 2 August 1940. In 1944, his mother, started the Richard Ormonde Shuttleworth Remembrance Trust "for the teaching of the science and practice of aviation and of afforestation and agriculture."

== Collection ==
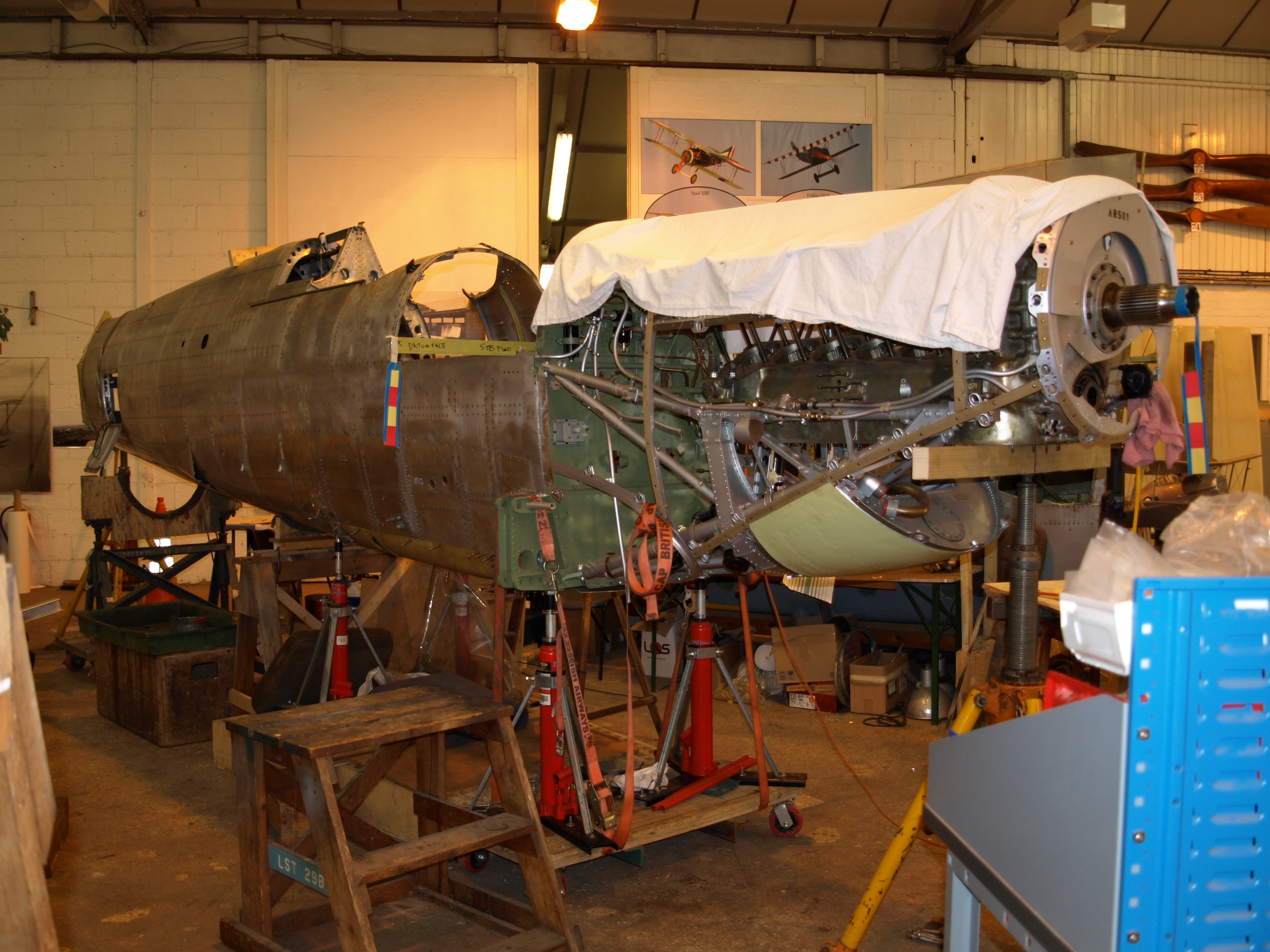
Spitfire Vc, AR501, during extensive renovation by the Collection in September 2008.

Restoration and maintenance work is carried out by a staff of 12 full-time and many volunteer engineers. These volunteers are all members of the 3,000-strong Shuttleworth Veteran Aeroplane Society (SVAS).

In addition to the aircraft, the collection houses a number of vintage and veteran cars. Events include model-flying days, flying proms and events dedicated to British engineering.

The Shuttleworth Collection puts an emphasis on restoring as many aircraft as possible to flying condition, in line with the founder's original intention. There are typically about seven air shows per year, including evening displays and an annual Flying Proms event.

== The Edwardian flying machines ==
Some of the most notable aircraft in the collection are the five Edwardian aeroplanes, of which one is the oldest British aeroplane still in flying condition. The oldest, with British civil registration G-AANG, is the Bleriot XI (still with original engine), which dates back to 1909; six years after the Wright brothers' aircraft and the world's oldest airworthy aeroplane, the next oldest being, at only three weeks newer by date of manufacture, the Old Rhinebeck Aerodrome's restored original Bleriot XI (Bleriot factory serial number 56, with civil registration N60094) in the United States.

== Aircraft in the collection ==
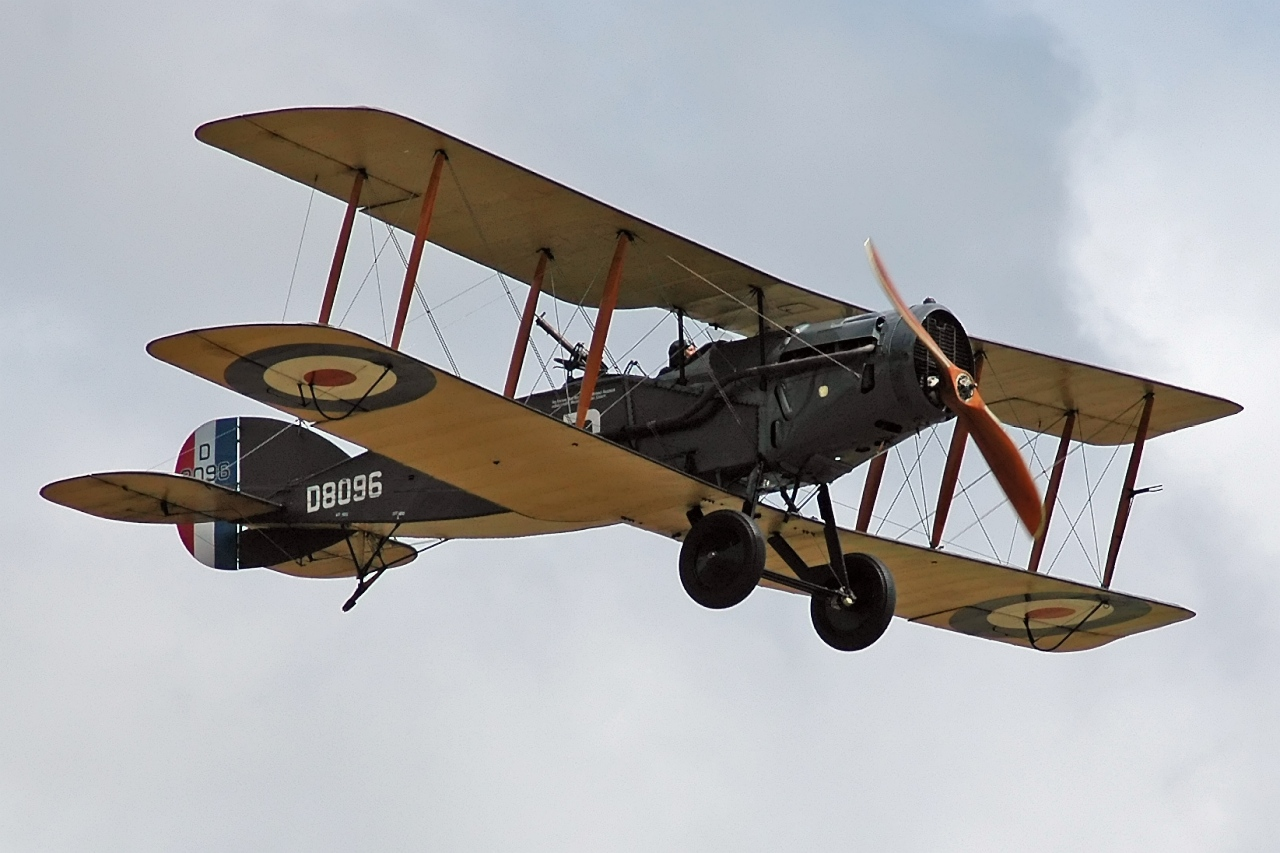
The Shuttleworth Collection's Bristol F.2B Fighter

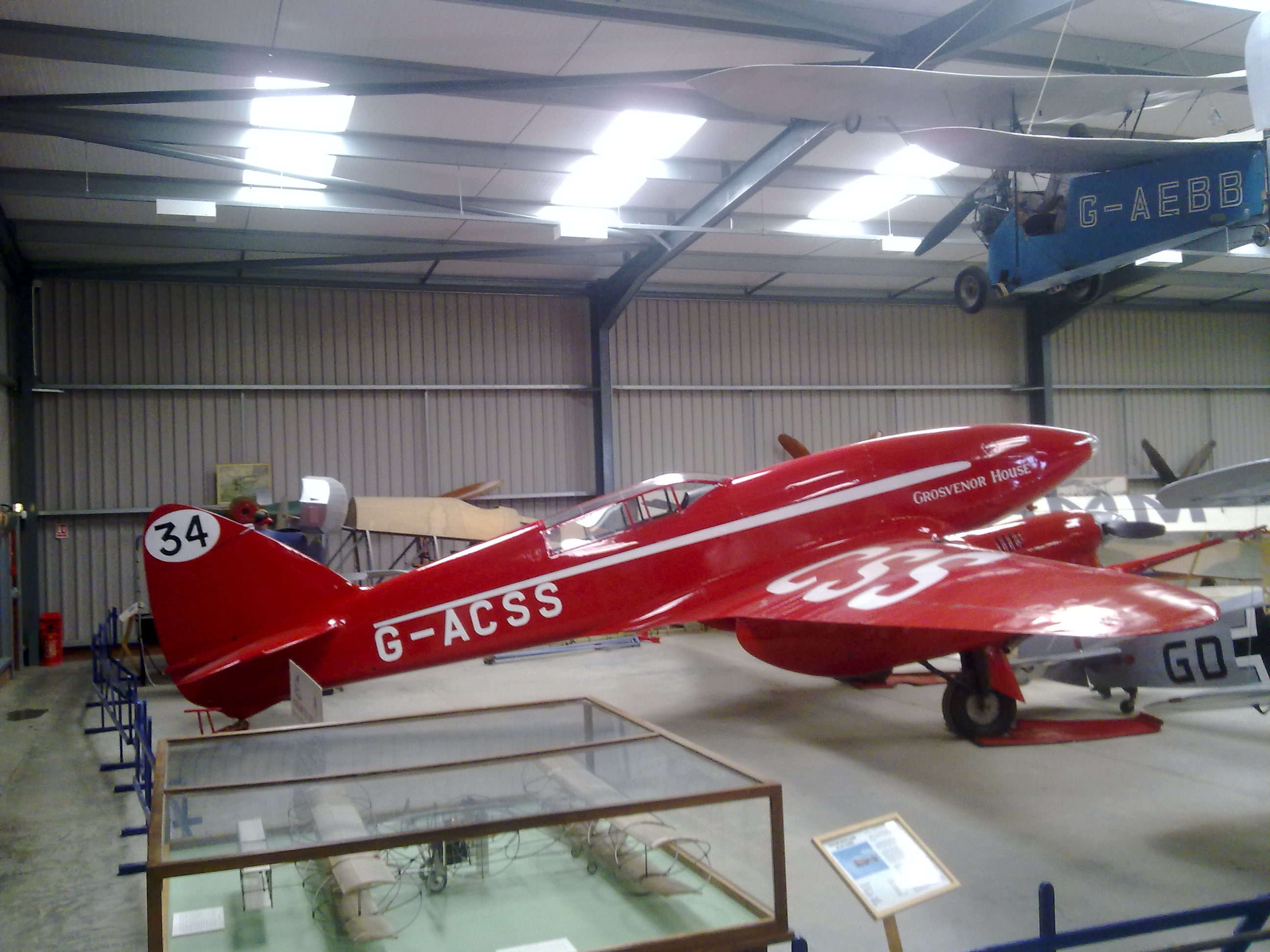
DH88 Comet Racer 'Grosvenor House' at Shuttleworth Collection 2010

Type	Date	Identity	Notes
ANEC II	1924	G-EBJO	Built for 1924 Lympne Trials
Avro 504K	1918	G-ADEV	Converted from Avro 504K painted as 'E3273'
Roe IV Triplane	1964	G-ARSG	Replica for Those Magnificent Men in their Flying Machines
Avro Tutor	1933	G-AHSA	Painted as RAF 'K3241'
Avro Anson 19	1946	G-AHKX	Restored by BAE Systems and donated to the Collection in 2022 after a period of temporary lease.
Blackburn Type D	1912	G-AANI	Oldest airworthy British aeroplane
Blackburn B-2	1936	G-AEBJ	Formerly part of the BAE Systems heritage flight based at Old Warden. Donated to the Collection in 2022.
Blériot XI	1909	G-AANG	World's oldest airworthy aircraft
Bristol Boxkite	1964	G-ASPP	Replica for Those Magnificent Men in their Flying Machines
Bristol F.2b Fighter	1918	G-AEPH	Painted as RAF 'B1162'
Bristol M.1C	2000	G-BWJM	Repro built by Northern Aeroplane Workshops, completed 2000 painted as RFC 'C4918'
Comper Swift	1932	G-ACTF	
de Havilland DH.51	1924	G-EBIR	'Miss Kenya'
de Havilland DH.53 Humming Bird	1923	G-EBHX	Crashed on 1 July 2012 killing pilot. Currently awaiting completion of rebuild.
de Havilland DH.60 Cirrus Moth	1925	G-EBLV	Formerly owned and leased to the Collection by BAE Systems. Donated to the Collection circa 2022.
de Havilland DH.60X Hermes Moth	1928	G-EBWD	This Moth was originally Richard Shuttleworth's own private plane and during its career was extensively modified with an original Cirrus Hermes engine but an x-legged undercarriage and different windshields on the front and rear cockpit.
de Havilland DH.82A Tiger Moth II	1942	G-ANKT	Painted as RAF 'K2585'
de Havilland DH.88 Comet	1934	G-ACSS	'Grosvenor House' Winner of 1934 England-Australia Race
De Havilland Canada DHC-1 Chipmunk 22	1952	G-BNZC	Painted as RCAF 671
Deperdussin Type A monoplane	1910	G-AANH	
Desoutter I	1930	G-AAPZ	
English Electric Wren	1923	G-EBNV	First equal in 1923 Lympne Trials
Fauvel AV.36	1955	BGA1999	By Wassmer in France, languished in a barn for c.40 years before restoration
Gloster Gladiator I	1937	G-AMRK	Painted as RAF 'K7985'
Hawker Cygnet	1992	G-CAMM	Replica built by Don Cashmore
Hawker Hind	1935	G-AENP	Painted as RAF 'K5414', rebuild completion expected in 2026
Hawker Hurricane	1939	G-BKTH	Converted to Sea Hurricane in 1941, painted as RN 'Z7015'
Hawker Tomtit	1931	G-AFTA	Painted as RAF 'K1786'
Messerschmitt Me 163 Komet		'191454'	Fuselage mockup with original engine - not currently on display.
Mignet HM.14 'Flying Flea'	1939	G-AEBB	Unairworthy, suspended from hangar roof
Miles Hawk Speed Six	1935	G-ADGP	A prominent 30s racer
Miles Magister	1939	G-AJRS	Painted as RAF 'P6382'
Parnall Elf	1932	G-AAIN	Sole survivor of three built
Percival Mew Gull	1934	G-AEXF	Alex Henshaw's England - Cape Town racer
Percival Provost T1	1955	G-KAPW	Painted as RAF 'XF603'
Polikarpov Po-2	1924	G-BSSY	Painted as Soviet Air Force '28'
Royal Aircraft Factory S.E.5a	1918	G-EBIA	Serial 'F904' now in its original 84 Squadron colours
Elliotts Primary EoN	1938	BGA580	Primary glider by Elliots of Newbury, based on German SG38
Slingsby Kirby Kite	1937	BGA310	Sport and training glider
Sopwith Camel	2017	G-BZSC	Repro by Northern Aeroplane Workshops completed in 2017
Sopwith Pup	1920	G-EBKY	Converted from Dove by Richard Shuttleworth, Painted as RFC '9917'
Sopwith Triplane	1990	G-BOCK	Repro by Northern Aero Workshops, completed 1990 painted as RNAS 'N6290'
Southern Martlet	1930	G-AAYX	
Supermarine Spitfire LF.Mk.Vc	1942	G-AWII	Serial 'AR501'
Westland Lysander Mk.IIIa	1942	G-AZWT	Painted as RAF 'V9367'

- Data from

Also resident at Old Warden, but privately owned:

- Miles M14a Hawk Trainer N3788 G-AKPF
- Westland Wallace replica fuselage
- De Havilland DH89A Rapide G-AGSH painted in British European Airways livery
- Sopwith Dove G-EAGA

Aircraft of the BAE Systems heritage collection were formerly resident at Old Warden, however the last three aircraft were donated to Shuttleworth in March 2022, becoming part of the collection proper.

== Vehicles in the collection ==
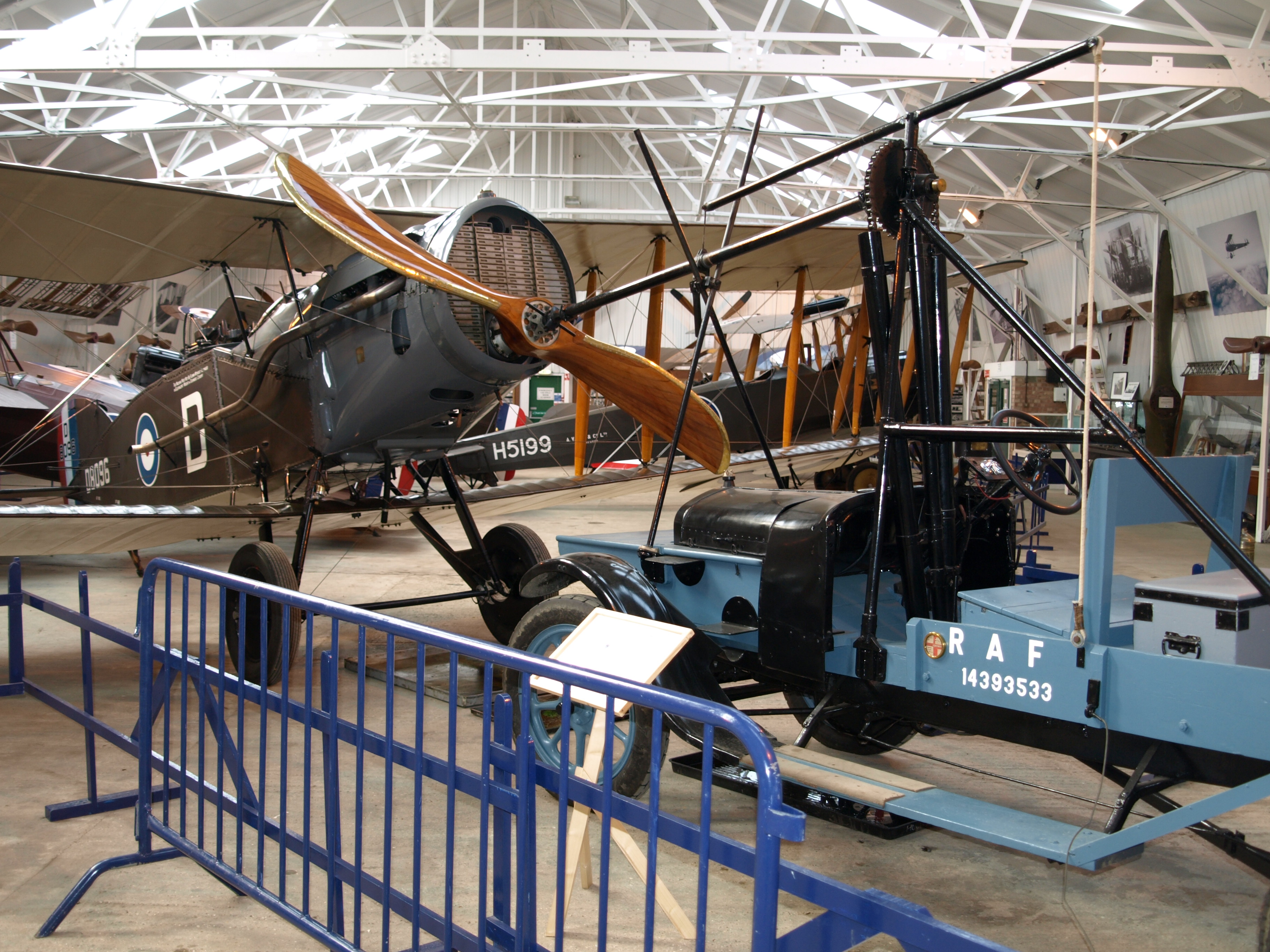
The Hucks starter of 1920.

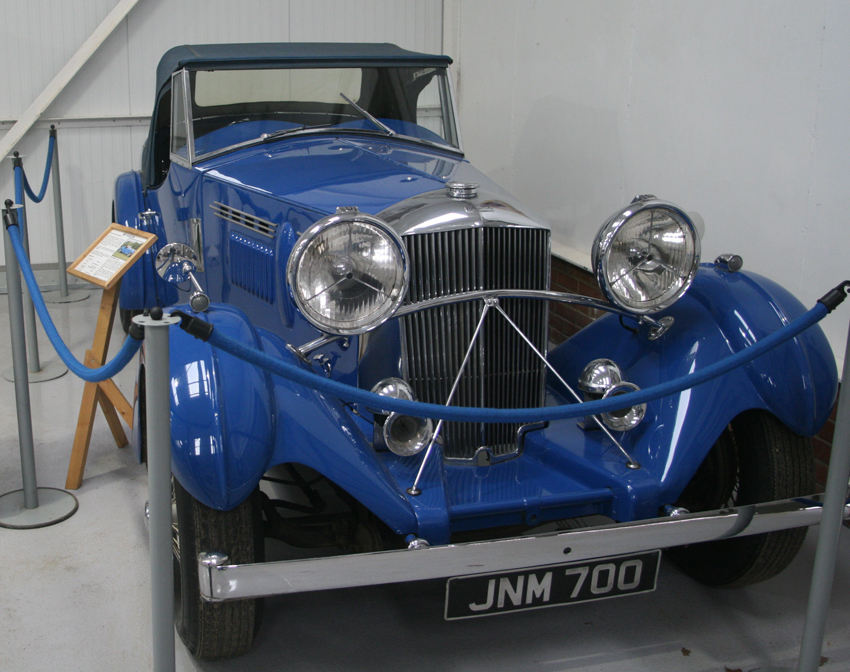
Richard Shuttleworth's 1937 Railton

- 1898 Panhard et Levassor
- 1899 Mors Petit Duc
- 1899 Benz International dogcart
- 1900 Marot-Gardon
- 1901 Locomobile Steam Car
- 1901 Arrol-Johnston
- 1902 Baby Peugeot
- 1903 Richard-Brasier
- 1903 De Dietrich
- 1912 Crossley 15
- 1912 Wolseley M5
- 1913 Morris Oxford
- 1920 Hucks starter
- 1923 Leyland SG7 bus
- 1926 Jowett Short-chassis tourer
- 1931 Austin 16 hp "Burnham"
- 1935 Austin Seven
- 1937 Railton
- 1937 Fiat Topolino
- 1937 MG TA
- 1939 Hillman Minx RAF Staff Car
- 1943 Fordson WOT 2H
- 1900 Singer Motor Wheel Motorcycle
- 1904 Aurora Motorcycle
- 1921 Scott Squirrel Combination
- 1923 Triumph SD Motorcycle
- 1927 Raleigh 14 Motorcycle
- 1929 Ariel Motorcycle
- 1938 Rudge Motorcycle
- 1940 BSA M20 Motorcycle
- 1950 Philips Cyclemaster
- 1952 Brockhouse Corgi Scooter
- 1955 BSA A7 Motorcycle
- 1955 New Hudson Motorcycle
- 1960 Norton ES2 Motorcycle

There is also a collection of tractors.

== See also ==
- Shuttleworth College (Bedfordshire)

Other large collections of flying historic aircraft

- Battle of Britain Memorial Flight, at RAF Coningsby, United Kingdom
- Cole Palen's Old Rhinebeck Aerodrome, directly inspired by the Shuttleworth collection, located in Red Hook and Rhinebeck, New York, United States
- Royal Navy Historic Flight, at RNAS Yeovilton, United Kingdom
- The Fighter Collection, at Duxford Aerodrome, United Kingdom
- Historic Aircraft Restoration Museum, in St Louis, Missouri, United States
