= Miles Hawk =

Type of aircraft

M.2 Hawk
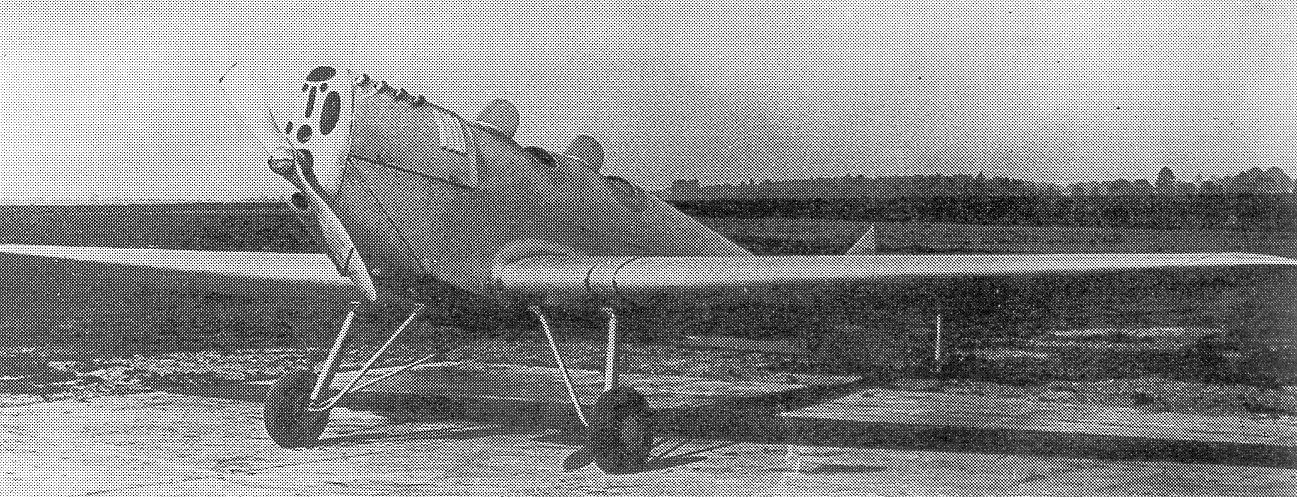

General information
- Type: Two-seat light monoplane
- Manufacturer: Miles Aircraft Limited
- Designer: Frederick George Miles
- Status: Out of production, out of service
- Number built: 55

History
- Manufactured: March 1933-July 1934
- First flight: 29 March 1933
- Variant: Miles Hawk Major

The Miles M.2 Hawk was a twin-seat light monoplane designed and produced by the British aircraft manufacturer Miles Aircraft Limited during the 1930s. It is the first of the company's aircraft to attain quantity production.

The Hawk's development started in 1932 following a conversation between designer F.G. Miles and Charles Powis, the latter offering Miles hangar space at Woodley Aerodrome to build his proposed affordable twin-seat monoplane. The aircraft was designed by Miles and his wife, while construction of the prototype was mostly performed by the carpenter Harry Hull. On 29 March 1933, the prototype performed its maiden flight.

The aircraft quickly proved its performance to be roughly 50 per cent greater than biplane contemporaries. Within 15 months, 47 Hawks had been sold to various domestic customers. An advanced derivative, the Miles Hawk Major, was also quickly developed, alongside several specialised versions of the original aircraft. Amongst other uses, the Hawk was entered into numerous air races. Production of the original Hawk series came to an end during July 1934.

== Development ==
=== Origins ===
The origins of the Hawk can be traced back to late 1932 and a discussion between F. G. Miles and Charles Powis in which the former expressed a desire to produce an affordable twin-seat low-wing monoplane. Powis, recognising the potential value of such a venture, opted to provide hangar space at Woodley Aerodrome for Miles to construct such an aircraft. Coincidentally, a batch of ADC Cirrus IIIA were also available at a discounted price, substantially reducing the cost of the overall aircraft. In light of these suitable conditions, construction of the first prototype commenced immediately following Powis' offer.

The design of the aircraft was produced by Miles and his wife, while much of the construction was performed by the carpenter Harry Hull, with some work undertaken by the Miles themselves. The design employed high-stress factors throughout, the calculations and blueprints all being produced by the Miles. Originally known as the Ibex, it was decided to change the name to Hawk to avoid possible confusion with the Hinkler Ibis.

The prototype Hawk performed the type's maiden flight on 29 March 1933. As a consequence of its relatively clean design, it was quickly proven that its performance was about 50 per cent greater than that of its typical biplane contemporaries. Despite its performance, the control surfaces exhibited no tenancy to flutter even when intentionally flown to induce the phenomenon. Within a week, 53 different pilots had flown the aircraft.

=== Production ===
Orders for the Hawk quickly followed the early test flights; within 15 months, 47 aircraft had been sold domestically. Its owners were typically keen to enter them in various air races; the first production aircraft, G-ACHJ, was promptly flown in the King's Cup air race of 1933, while the second, G-ACHK, was a contender for the Wakefield Cup.

The aircraft sold relatively well for the time, partially as a consequence of its relatively low base purchase price of only £395. On the back of this success, Miles endeavoured to expand the production range in pursuit of further sales. In response to individual customer requirements, the company constructed a number of special one-off models, which included a cabin monoplane (M.2A), a long-range single-seater (M.2B) and three-seat versions for joy riding (M.2D).

During 1934, in reaction to the appearance of the inverted de Havilland Gipsy Major engine, an improved model of the Hawk was quickly introduced, known as the Miles Hawk Major. This was also accompanied by a specialised version intended for air racing, the principal changes of which being the removal of the front seat to permit the installation of a longer and more powerful six-cylinder de Havilland Gipsy Six; it is sometimes referred to the Miles Hawk Speed Six. Production of the original Hawk series came to an end in July 1934.

== Design ==
The Miles Hawk was a two-seat lightweight cantilever monoplane. Somewhat unusually for the era, it featured wings that were designed to be folded. The aircraft had an open cockpit with a tandem seating arrangement for two. The airframe was largely composed of spruce, with the exterior being covered by a combination of birch and ply; even elements such as the engine mounts were made of wood to reduce costs. The undercarriage was supplied by Dowty Group, which were furnished with low-pressure tyres. Some Hawks, but not all, were furnished with wheel brakes.

== Variants ==
M.2
Standard production two-seat version, powered by a single 95 hp A.D.C. Cirrus IIIA engine.
M.2A
Cabin version powered by a de Havilland Gipsy III engine, one built.
M.2B
Long-range single-seater powered by an A.D.C Cirrus Hermes IV, one-built.
M.2C
Re-engined with one 120 hp de Havilland Gipsy III engine, one built.
M.2D
Three-seat version with one 95 hp A.D.C. Cirrus IIIA engine, six built.

=== Hawk Major ===
The Hawk Major was developed to take advantage of the inverted design of the new de Havilland Gipsy Major engine. Lowering the cylinders below the propeller shaft axis greatly improved pilot visibility and allowed a shorter, lighter undercarriage.

The Hawk Speed Six was a single-seat racing variant of the Hawk Major, with a larger Gipsy Six engine.

== Operators ==
=== Military operators ===
Australia

- Royal Australian Air Force - Two aircraft

New Zealand

- Royal New Zealand Air Force

South Africa

- South African Air Force

== Specifications (M.2) ==
Data from British Civil Aircraft 1919–1972: Volume III, Miles Aircraft Since 1925, Volume 1

General characteristics

- Capacity: Two
- Length: 24 ft 0 in (7.32 m)
- Wingspan: 33 ft 0 in (10.06 m)
- Height: 6 ft 8 in (2.03 m)
- Wing area: 169 sq ft (15.7 m^{2})
- Empty weight: 1,014 lb (460 kg)
- Gross weight: 1,800 lb (816 kg)
- Powerplant: 1 × ADC Cirrus IIIA piston engine , 95 hp (71 kW)

Performance

- Maximum speed: 115 mph (185 km/h, 100 kn)
- Cruise speed: 100 mph (160 km/h, 87 kn)
- Range: 450 mi (720 km, 390 nmi)
- Service ceiling: 16,000 ft (4,900 m)
- Rate of climb: 860 ft/min (4.4 m/s)

== See also ==
Related development

- Miles Hawk Major

Aircraft of comparable role, configuration, and era

- González Gil-Pazó GP-1
