= Alphonse Legros =

French-British painter and sculptor (1837–1911)

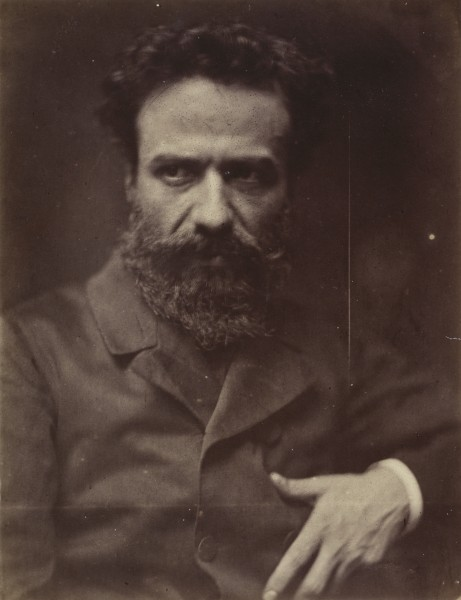
- Photograph of Legros by David Wilkie Wynfield
- Born: 8 May 1837; Dijon, France
- Died: 11 December 1911 (aged 74); Watford, Hertfordshire, England
- Education: Maître Nicolardo, Cambon, Lecoq de Boisbaudran

Alphonse Legros (French pronunciation: [alfɔ̃s ləɡʁo]; 8 May 1837 – 8 December 1911) was a French, later British, painter, etcher, sculptor, and medallist. He moved to London in 1863 and later was naturalized as British. He was important as a teacher in the British etching revival.

== Life ==
Legros was born in Dijon; his father was an accountant, and came from the neighbouring village of Véronnes. While young, Legros visited the farms of his relatives, and the peasants and landscapes of that part of France are the subjects of many of his works. He was sent to the art school at Dijon with a view to qualifying for a trade, and was apprenticed to Maître Nicolardo, house decorator and painter of images. In 1851, Legros left for Paris to take another situation; but passing through Lyon he worked for six months as journeyman wall-painter under the decorator Beuchot, who was painting the chapel of Cardinal Bonald in the cathedral.

In Paris, Legros studied with Charles-Antoine Cambon, scene-painter and decorator of theatres. He also attended the drawing-school of Lecoq de Boisbaudran (the "Petite école") where he found himself in sympathy with Jules Dalou and Auguste Rodin. In 1855, he attended the evening classes of the École des Beaux Arts. Legros learned the art of etching around 1857, and taught himself the making of medals.

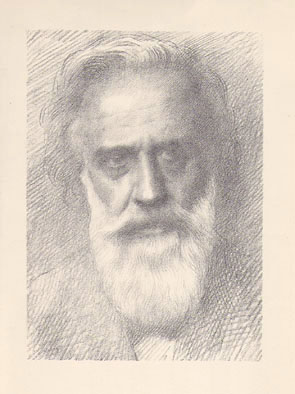
Self-portrait etching by Alphonse Legros

Legros sent two portraits to the Paris Salon of 1857: one was rejected, and formed part of the exhibition of protest organized by François Bonvin in his studio; the other, which was accepted, was a profile portrait of his father. This work was presented to the museum at Tours by the artist when his friend Jean-Charles Cazin was curator. Champfleury saw the work in the Salon, and sought out the artist to enlist him in the "Realists," a group round Gustave Courbet.

In 1859, Legros's L'Angelus was exhibited, the first of the church interiors for which he was best known. Two years later Ex Voto (1861; Musée des Beaux-Arts de Dijon) was exhibited, but only obtained a mention at the Salon. He moved to England in 1863 having been encouraged by his friend, James Abbot McNeil Whistler, and in 1864 married Frances Rosetta Hodgson. At first he lived by his etching and teaching. He then became teacher of etching at the South Kensington School of Art, and in 1876 Slade Professor at University College London in succession to Edward Poynter. Legros was never a fluent English speaker. Therefore his teaching was more through demonstration than verbal instruction. His students at the Slade included Charles Holroyd, who later became Director of the National Gallery and William Stang. As gifted artists they flourished under this approach, however, not all of his pupils flourished and some found his non-verbal approach to be frustrating. Although now based in London, he continued to exhibit at the Paris Salon. He also had works included in the second Impressionist group exhibition in 1876. His work was much admired by his friend Edgar Degas and a study of hands by him was displayed between two drawings by Ingres in his bedroom.

Whilst teaching at the Slade School Legros taught a large contingent of women, who came to be known as the Slade Girls. Through his field of sculpture he encouraged the design of medals based upon the Italian renaissance style of portrait, illustrating the character, profession or life of the individual portrayed.

The Slade Girls attracted commissions from a range of societies and organisations due to the beauty and skill of their work. Pupils of note include the Casella sisters (Ella and Nelia), Jessie Mothersole, Fedora Gleichen, Lilian Swainson (later Hamilton) and Elinor Hallé.

In his Etchings by French and English Artists (1874) Philip Gilbert Hamerton included work by Legros and Léon Gaucherel.

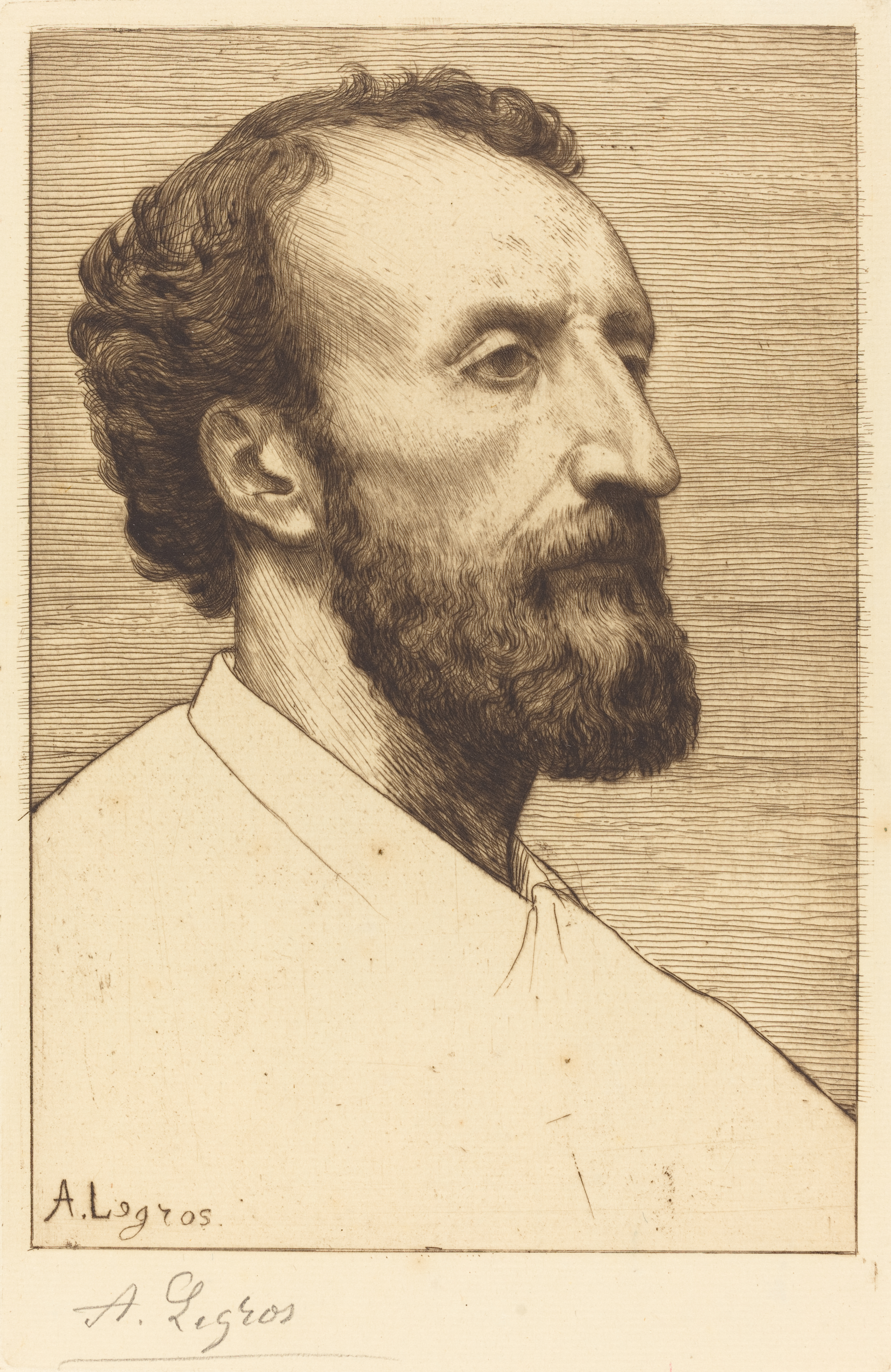
Portrait etching of Dalou by Legros

Legros was naturalized as a British subject in 1881, and remained at University College for 17 years. He would draw or paint a torso or a head for the students in an hour or less; in the painting school he insisted on a good outline, preserved by a thin rub in of umber, and then the work was to be finished in a single painting. He considered the traditional journey to Italy an important part of artistic training, and gave part of his salary to augment the income available for a travelling studentship.

== Personal life ==
At the time of his naturalization as in 1881, Legros was described as a married French artist aged 43, living at Brook Green, Hammersmith, with four of his children, Lucien Alphonse, aged 15, Marie Florence, 13, Alfred Victor, 11, and Aimee Clotilde, 3. His eldest son, Lucien, became an engineer and president of the Institution of Automobile Engineers, he started a motor vehicle company with Guy Knowles (Legros & Knowles Ltd in Cumberland Park, Willesden Junction, Willesden) and they later established the Iris Car Company.

Legros died on 8 December 1911 in Watford.

== Works ==
Later works, after Legros resigned his professorship in 1892, returned to the manner of his early days—imaginative landscapes, castles in Spain, and farms in Burgundy, etchings such the series of The Triumph of Death, and the sculptured fountains for the gardens of the Duke of Portland at Welbeck Abbey. Pictures, drawings and etchings by Legros, went to the following galleries and museums:

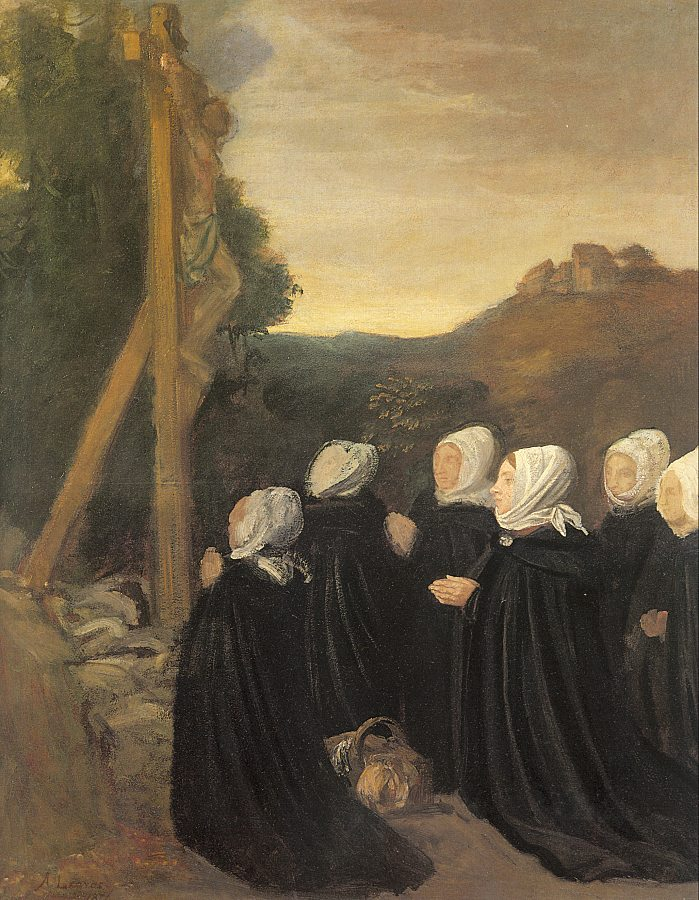
The Calvary (1874), Musée d'Orsay

- "Amende Honorable", "Dead Christ", bronzes, medals and twenty-two drawings, in the Luxembourg, Paris
- "Landscape," "Study of a Head," and portraits of Browning, Burne-Jones, Cassel, Huxley and Marshall, at the Victoria and Albert Museum, Kensington
- "Femmes en prière" (Tate, London)
- "The Tinker" and six other works from the lonides Collection, bequeathed to South Kensington
- "Christening", "Barricade", "The Poor at Meat", two portraits and several drawings and etchings, collection of Lord Carlisle
- "Two Priests at the Organ", "Landscape" and etchings, collection of Rev. Stopford Brooke
- "Head of a Priest", collection of Mr Vereker Hamilton
- "The Weed-burner", some sculpture and a large collection of etchings and drawings, Mr Guy Knowles
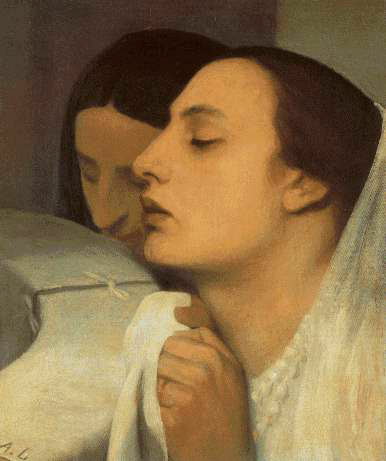
  Communion
- "Psyche," collection of Mr L W Hudson
- "Snow Scene," collection of George Frederic Watts RA
- Thirty-five drawings and etchings, the Print Room, British Museum
- "Jacob's Dream" and twelve drawings of the antique, Cambridge
- "St Jerome", two studies of heads and some drawings, Manchester
- "The Pilgrimage" and "Study made before the Class" (Walker Art Gallery, Liverpool)
- "Study of Heads," Peel Pan Museum, Salford.
- "Portrait of Cardinal With Patron Saint" (oil painting), Raclin Murphy Museum of Art, Notre Dame University
- "Communion" (around 1876)
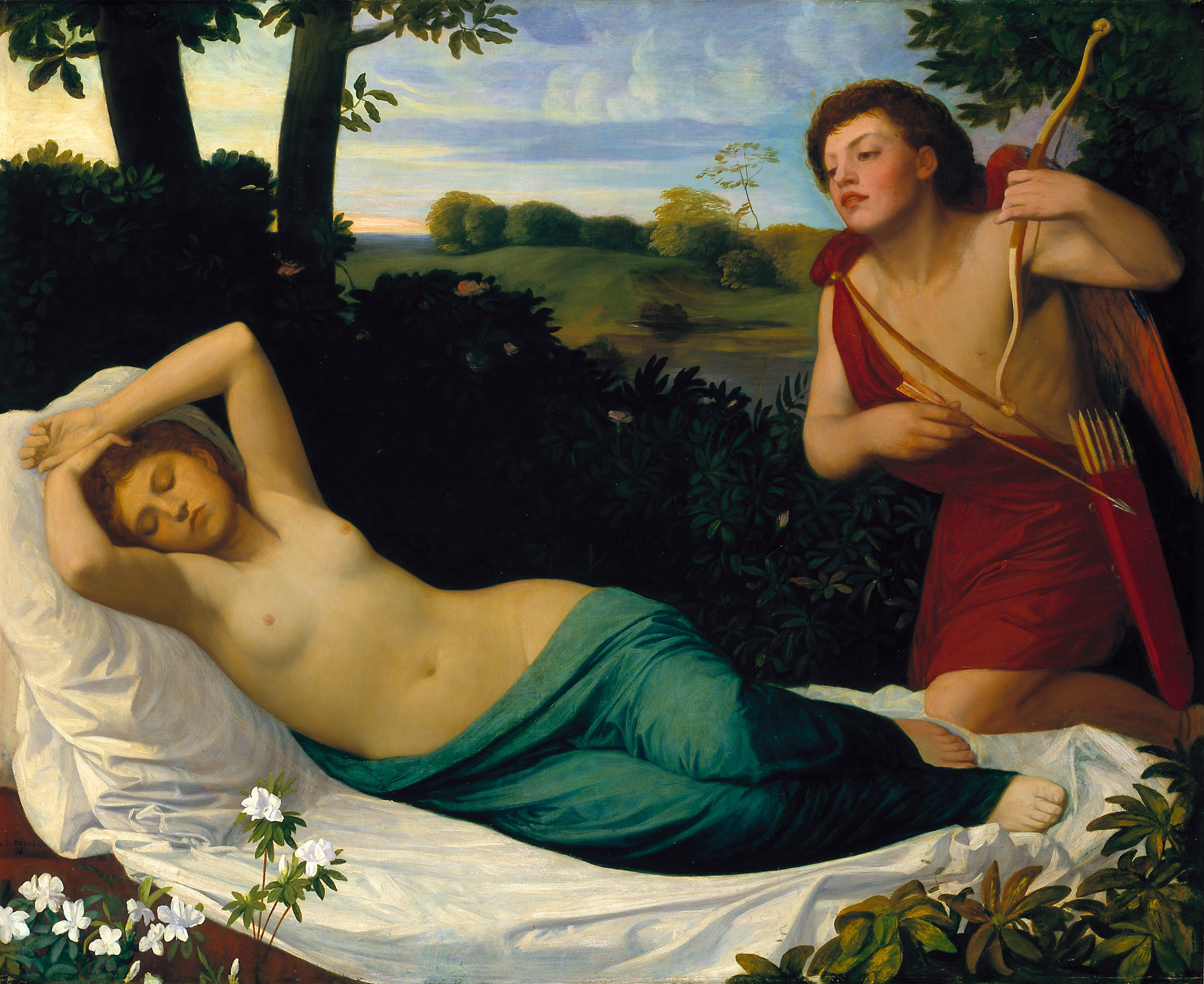
Cupid and Psyche, 1867

The Tinker, 1874

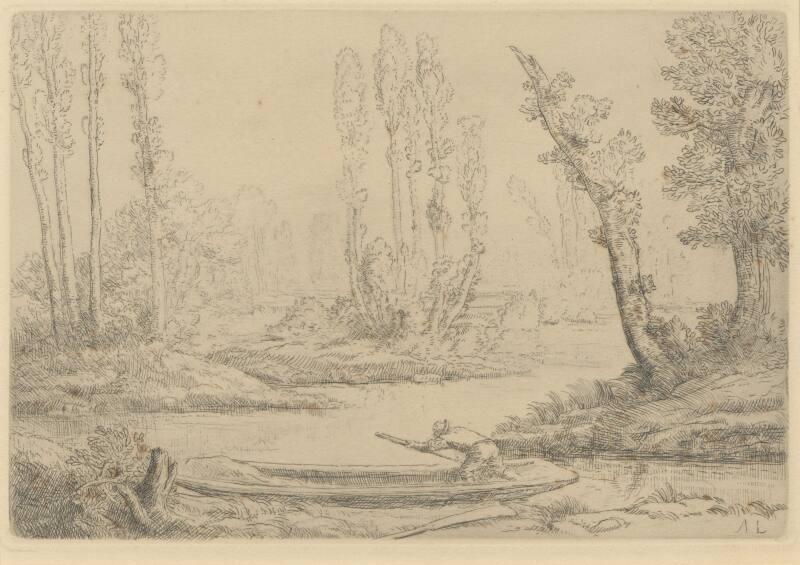
River Scene With Trees - ABDAG006425

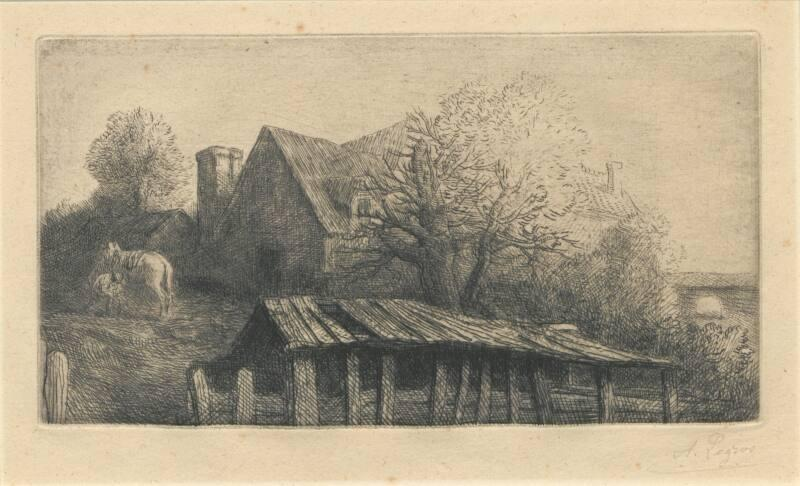
Une Ancienne Auberge - ABDAG006424

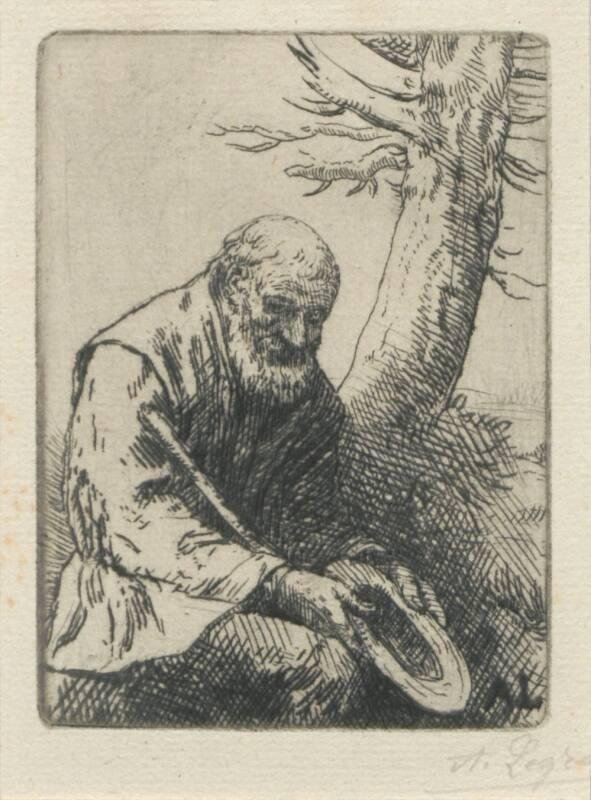
Beggar With Hat - ABDAG006423

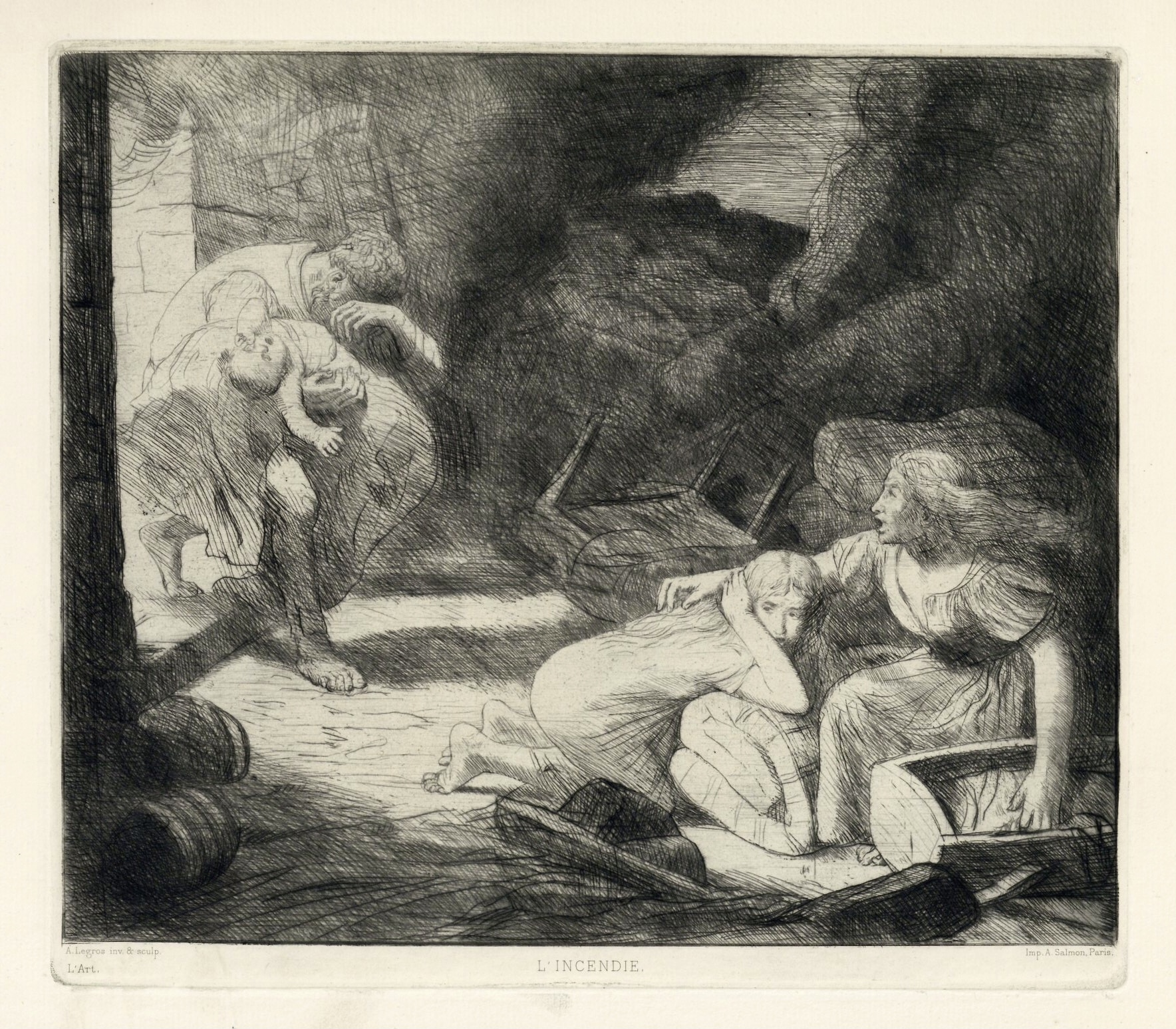
L’incendie (1876)

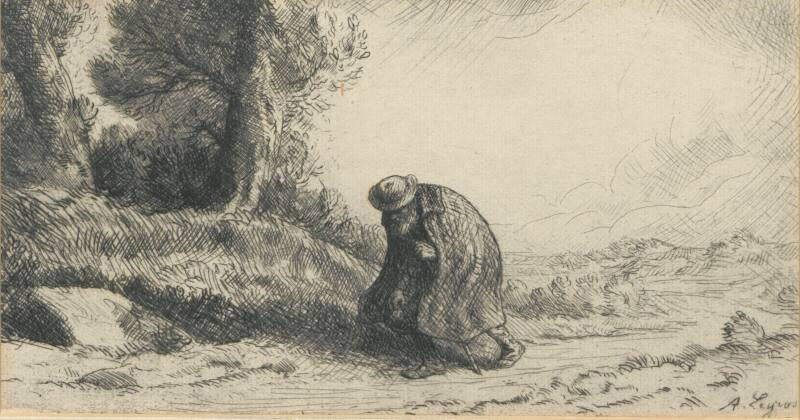
Vagabond passant dans une Ruelle - ABDAG006422

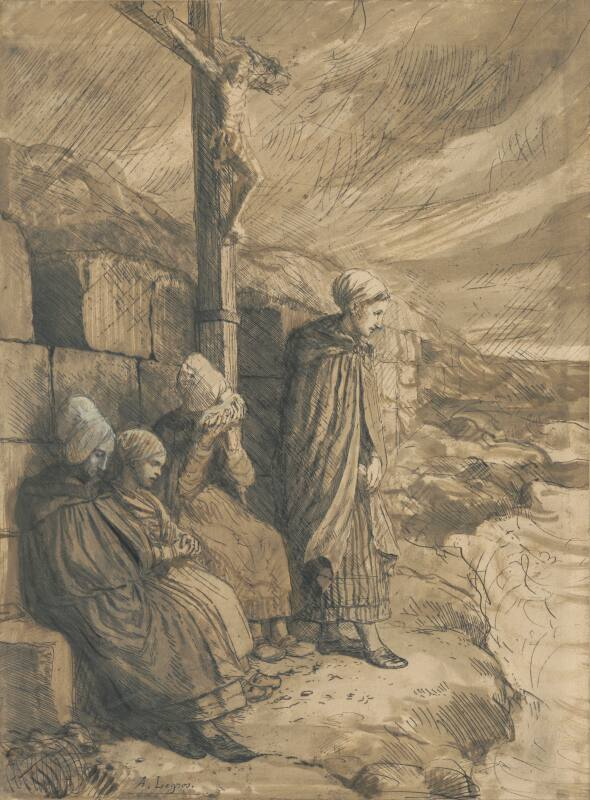
Les Femmes au "Crucifixion" - ABDAG011896

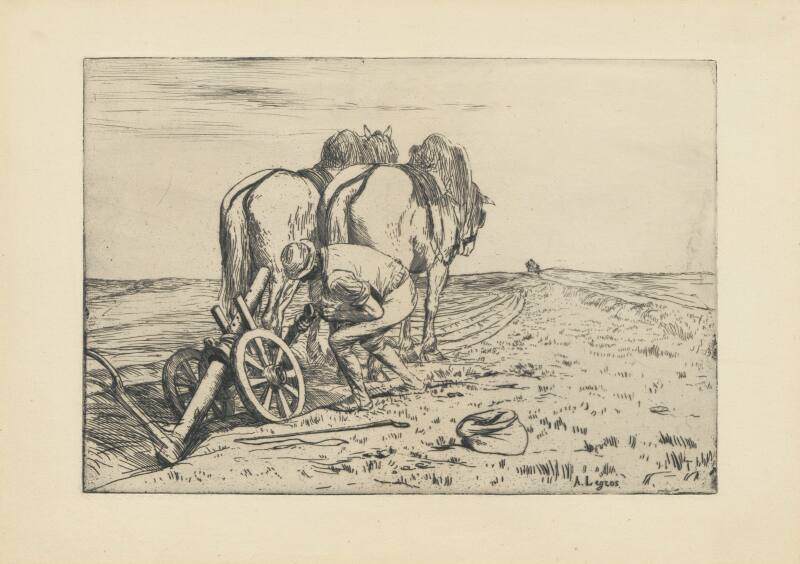
La Charrue - ABDAG011892

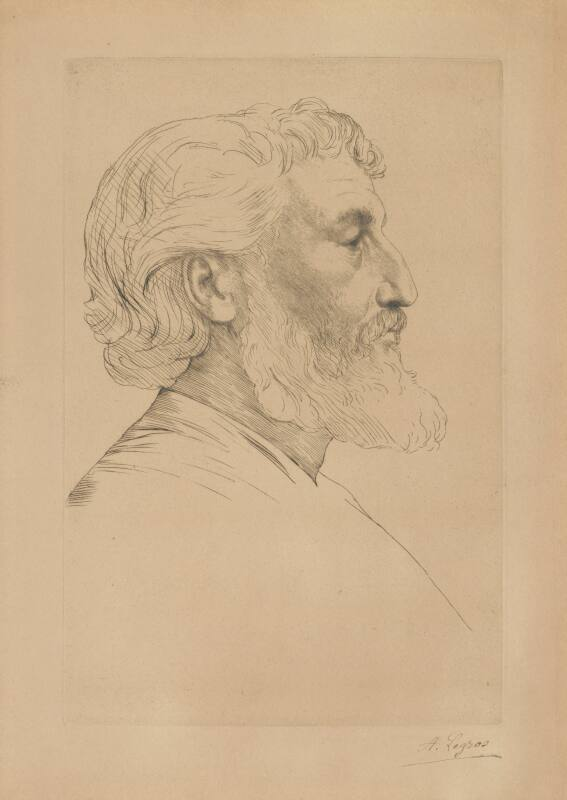
Portrait de Sir Frederic Leighton PRA - ABDAG011890

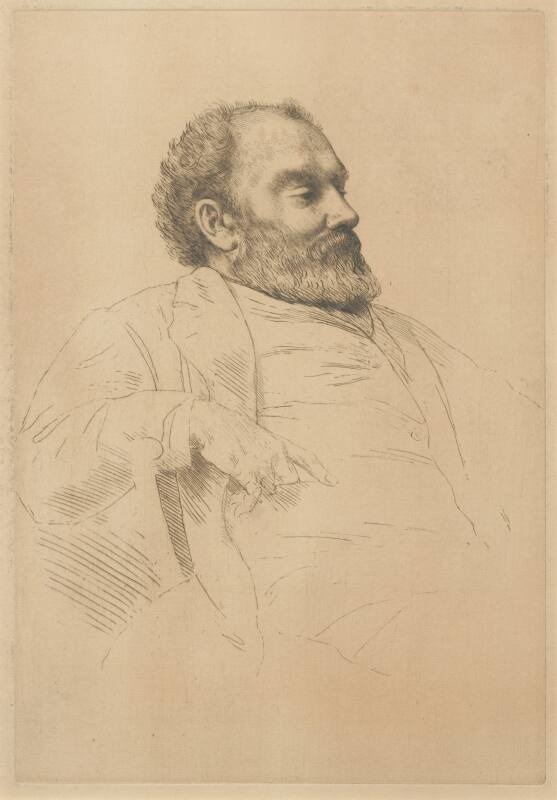
Portrait de Val Prinsep RA - ABDAG011879

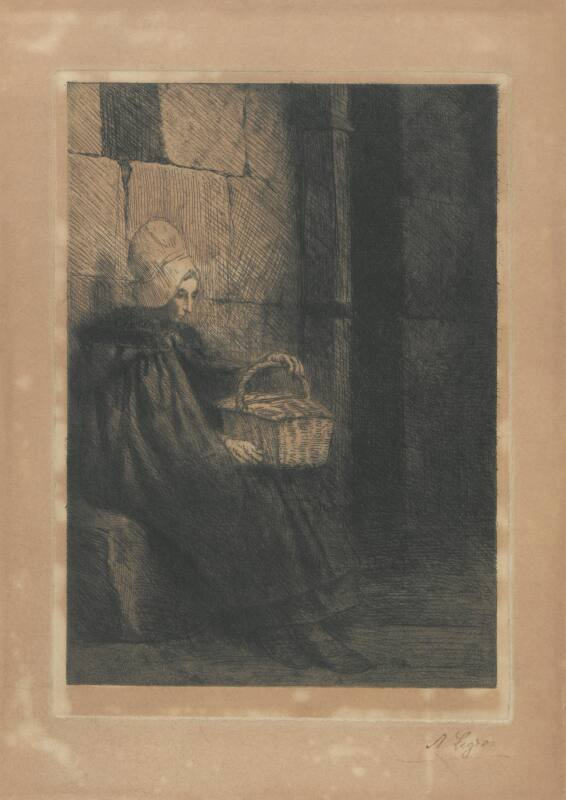
Paysanne Des Environs De Boulogne - ABDAG011871

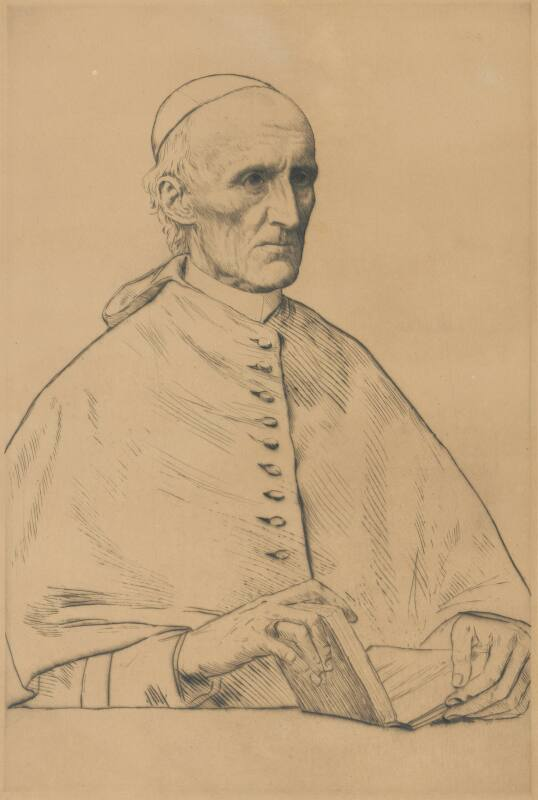
S.E. Cardinal Manning - ABDAG011865

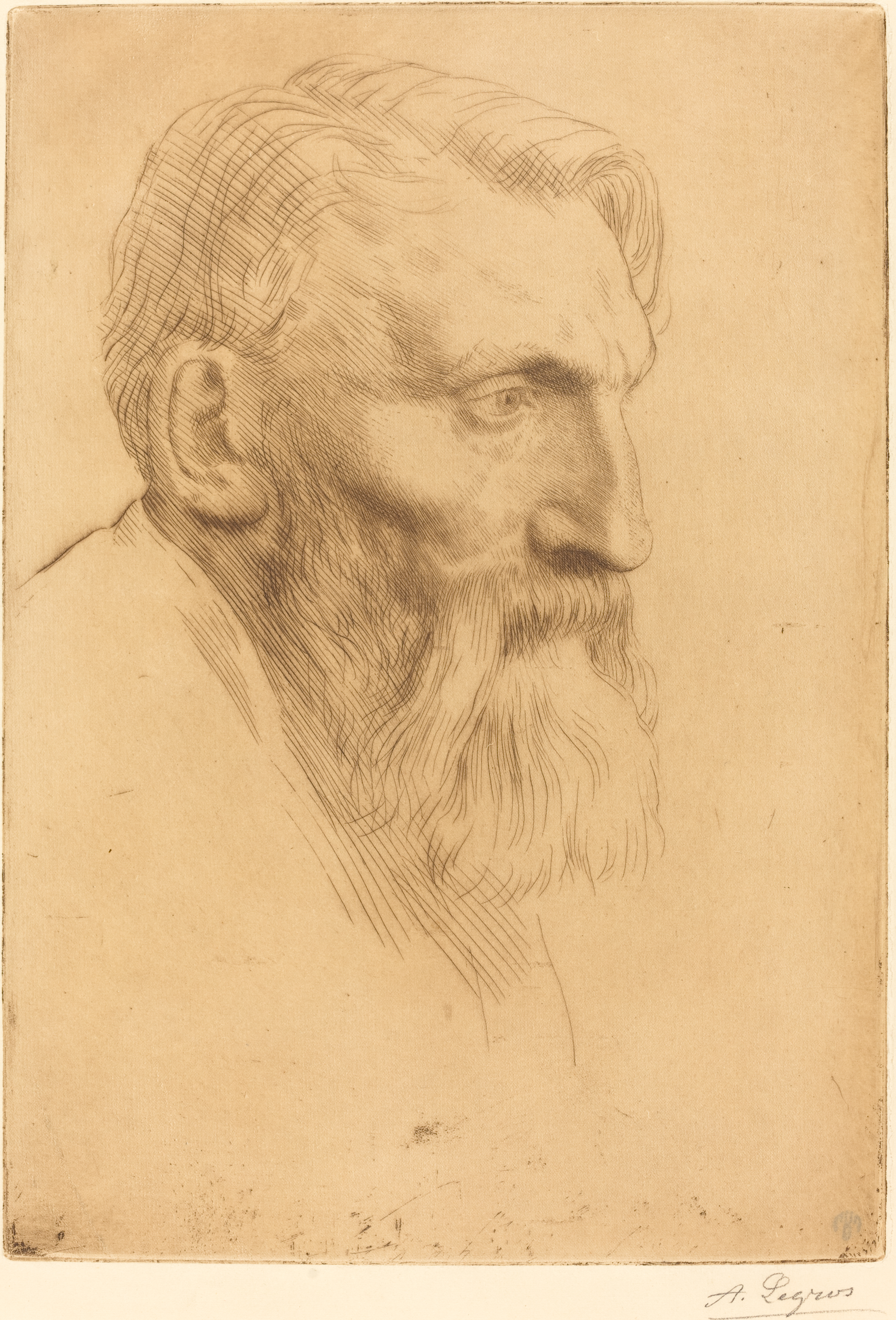
Portrait etching of Rodin by Legros
