= De Havilland Biplane No. 1 =

Biplane No. 1

General information
- Type: Experimental aircraft
- Manufacturer: Geoffrey de Havilland
- Status: Destroyed
- Number built: 1

History
- First flight: December 1909

De Havilland Biplane No. 1 is a name applied retrospectively to the first aircraft constructed by Geoffrey de Havilland, who built and flew it once in December 1909. De Havilland undertook the project with the assistance of his friend, and soon to be brother-in-law, Frank Hearle, and financed the project with £1,000 borrowed from his maternal grandfather as an advance on his inheritance.

The resulting design was a three-bay biplane with an open-truss fuselage, equal-span unstaggered wings, and a four-wheeled undercarriage. Power was provided by a 45 hp (30 kW) de Havilland Iris flat-four engine (custom-built by the Iris Car Company for £220) driving two pusher propellers mounted behind the wings. A fin and stabiliser were carried to the rear, with a large elevator at the front of the aircraft. Lateral control was provided by ailerons attached to the upper wing, de Havilland's wife, Louise, sewed the linen surfaces of the wings.

With construction continuing at Fulham, de Havilland and Hearle looked for a site to test the aircraft. During a visit to Crux Easton in the summer, they discovered unused sheds that had been built on Lord Carnarvon's estate at Seven Barrows by John Moore-Brabazon. De Havilland purchased them in August for £150 and secured Lord Carnarvon's permission to fly from his land.

By December, de Havilland and Hearle relocated the aircraft to the sheds and took rooms at a nearby inn. After ground tests, they sent the aircraft rolling down Beacon Hill with de Havilland at the controls. It became airborne briefly, covering some 100 ft (35 m) before the left wing failed, and the aircraft crashed. De Havilland's most serious injury was a blow to the wrist from one of the still-spinning propellers, received after extricating himself from the wreckage. The engine was salvaged and powered the team's next aircraft, the de Havilland Biplane No. 2, which first flew in September 1910, also at Beacon Hill.

== Specifications ==
Data from

General characteristics

- Crew: 1
- Length: 29 ft 0 in (8.84 m)
- Wingspan: 36 ft 0 in (10.97 m)
- Wing area: 408 sq ft (37.9 m^{2})
- Gross weight: 850 lb (386 kg)
- Powerplant: 1 × de Havilland Iris water-cooled flat-4, 45 hp (34 kW)
