= De Havilland Iris =

1900s British piston aircraft engine

Iris
- de Havilland Iris
- Type: Piston aero engine
- Manufacturer: Iris Cars Ltd, Willesden
- First run: 1909
- Major applications: de Havilland Biplane No. 1; de Havilland Biplane No. 2
- Number built: 6

The de Havilland Iris was a British four-cylinder, liquid-cooled, horizontally opposed aero engine. Notable as the first aero engine to be designed by Geoffrey de Havilland it was produced in small numbers between 1909 and 1910 by Iris Cars Ltd of Willesden from which it took its name.

== Design and development ==
By 1908 Geoffrey de Havilland had designed and built two motorcycle engines and was planning his first aircraft, the de Havilland Biplane No. 1. He had studied the engine used by the Wright brothers and believed that he could design a similar unit with an improved power-to-weight ratio. Whilst working as a designer for the Motor Omnibus Construction Company in London he produced drawings for his new engine over a period of three to four months and commissioned the Iris Cars Ltd, where his brother Ivon de Havilland had been the Chief Designer, to build it at a cost of £250.

The design featured a horizontally opposed, four-cylinder layout with a single camshaft operating poppet valves through pushrods that were hollowed to save weight. The crankshaft was supported on ball bearings which allowed a simple 'splash' lubrication system to be used. Cooling was by water with the cylinders being encased in copper jackets. The engine ran adequately but was not placed into series production. A small order was received from the British Government for use in airships.

== 1957 replica ==
In 1957 instructors and apprentices from the de Havilland Aircraft Company Technical School decided to construct a replica engine, almost 50 years after the original Iris was built. The Iris Motor Company had long since closed and its records, along with the original engine drawings, were destroyed by German bombing during World War II. Flight magazine had featured an article on the engine in May 1910 with a detailed technical description and line drawings. This information along with the original designer's memory were used to produce a new set of drawings and components. Several companies involved with the original engine assisted with new parts, Claudel-Hobson supplied the carburettor, Lodge Plugs Ltd the spark plugs and Simms Motor Units assisted with re-conditioning a magneto that had been borrowed from the London Science Museum.

Connected to a lathe via a belt drive, the engine started at the first attempt in May 1961 and idled steadily at 2-300 rpm. It is reported that the engine was then displayed in the showroom of the de Havilland Engine Company at Leavesden.

== Applications ==
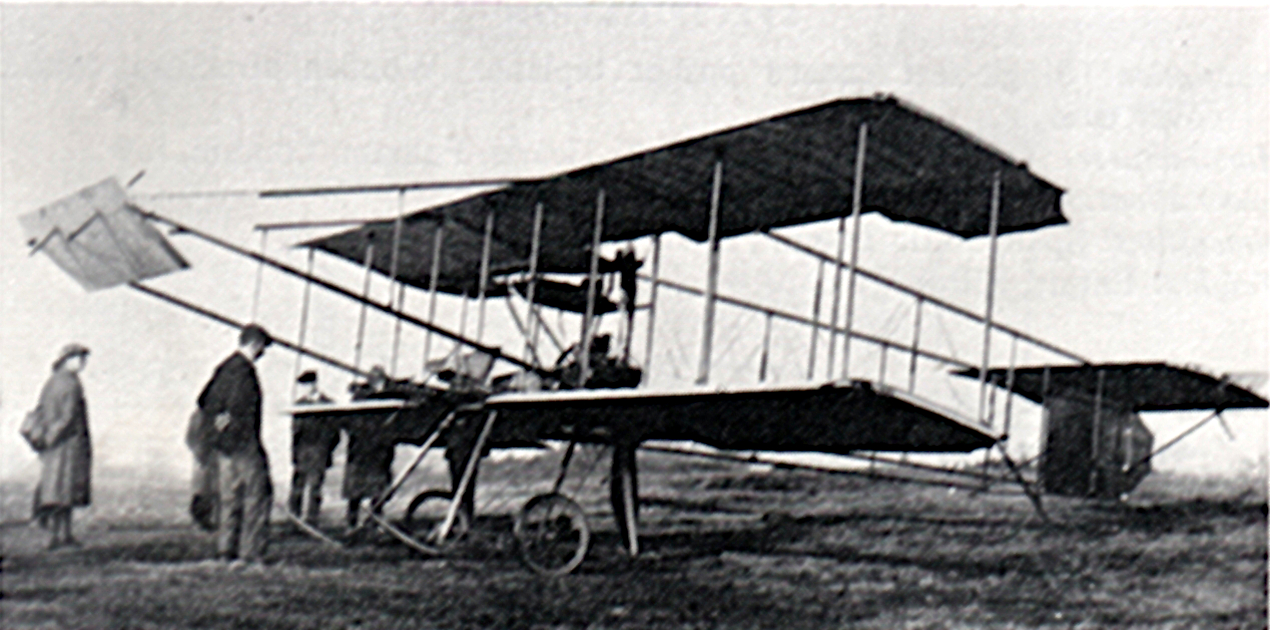
Iris-powered de Havilland Biplane No. 2 or RAF F.E.1

- de Havilland Biplane No. 1
- de Havilland Biplane No. 2
- Government Balloon Factory Gamma

== Specifications (Iris) ==
Data from Lumsden and Flight

=== General characteristics ===
- Type: 4-cylinder liquid-cooled horizontally opposed piston aircraft engine
- Bore: 4.5 in (114 mm)
- Stroke: 4.75 in (120 mm)
- Displacement: 301.46 cu in (4.94 L)
- Dry weight: 250 lb (113 kg)

=== Components ===
- Valvetrain: Overhead valve
- Fuel system: Carburettor
- Fuel type: Petrol
- Cooling system: Water-cooled, thermo-siphon system

=== Performance ===
- Power output: 45 hp (33.5 kW) at 1,500 rpm
- Specific power: 0.15 hp/cu in (6.8 kW/L)
- Power-to-weight ratio: 0.18 hp/lb (0.3 kW/kg)

== See also ==
- de Havilland Aircraft Heritage Centre

Comparable engines

- Green C.4

Related lists

- List of aircraft engines
