= Guy Knowles =

British engineer, art collector and mountaineer (1879–1959)

Guy John Fenton Knowles
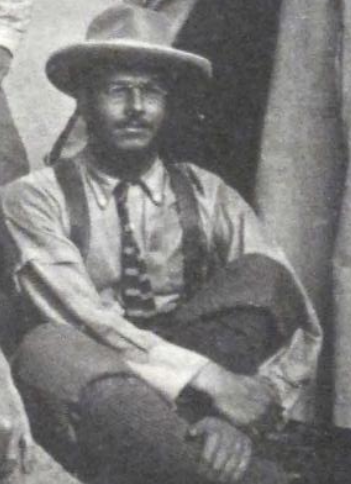
- Guy John Fenton Knowles in the Kararkoram 1902 (from Guillarmod 1904)
- Born: 1 July 1879
- Died: 8 April 1959 (aged 79); Dorking, Surrey, England
- Education: Trinity College, Cambridge
- Occupations: Engineer, mountaineer
- Parent(s): Charles Julius Kino, Louisa Essinger

Guy John Fenton Knowles (1879–1959) was an engineer, an art collector and a benefactor of several museum collections. He was also a member of the expedition which made the first serious attempt to climb K2, the second-highest mountain in the World.

Guy Knowles was the son of Charles Julius Kino, a wealthy Russian-born wool merchant and hotel proprietor who was a friend and patron of Alphonse Legros and also knew Rodin, Kino changed his name to Knowles in the 1880s. As a boy Guy Knowles was allowed to play with clay in Rodin's studio.

Knowles was educated at Rugby and Trinity College, Cambridge, and took a Second Class in Pt. I of the Mechanical Sciences Tripos in 1901.

Knowles's father died in 1900, whilst Guy was at Cambridge, and left him a considerable inheritance. In 1904, he and Lucien Legros, the son of the artist Alphonse Legros, started a motor vehicle company: Legros & Knowles Ltd in Cumberland Park, Willesden Junction, Willesden. Knowles purportedly provided a considerable portion of the company's finances. The two later established the Iris Car Company.

== Mountaineering ==
For a number of years, Knowles climbed in the Swiss Alps, in 1898 he was climbing there in the company of Oscar Eckenstein. In 1902 Eckenstein led an expedition making the first serious attempt to climb K2. Knowles was a member of that party and reportedly financed most of the expedition's costs. At one point on the expedition Aleister Crowley, another expedition member, threatened Knowles with a revolver and had to be forcibly disarmed, Knowles kept the revolver until the end of his life in 1959. Although he never climbed again in the Greater Ranges he did make further climbing trips to the Swiss Alps and was there with Eckenstein in 1904.

== War service ==
During the First World War, Knowles served in the Royal Garrison Artillery, reaching the rank of Captain. He was twice mentioned in despatches and was awarded the French Croix de Guerre and the Greek Military Cross.

== Art bequests ==
In his later years, Knowles lived in "a house full of treasures", which included a Degas bronze, two Rodins, ten Whistlers, and a magnificent Guardi sketch — apparently his father had bought the Guardi and a Titian sketch for 12s 6d each in the 1880s. In his will he left to the Fitzwilliam Museum what was described as "a remarkable collection of paintings, drawings, bronzes and miscellaneous works of art", and he is regarded as a major donor of the Fitzwilliam's Whistler collection.
