= Cupid and Psyche (Legros) =

Painting by Alphonse Legros

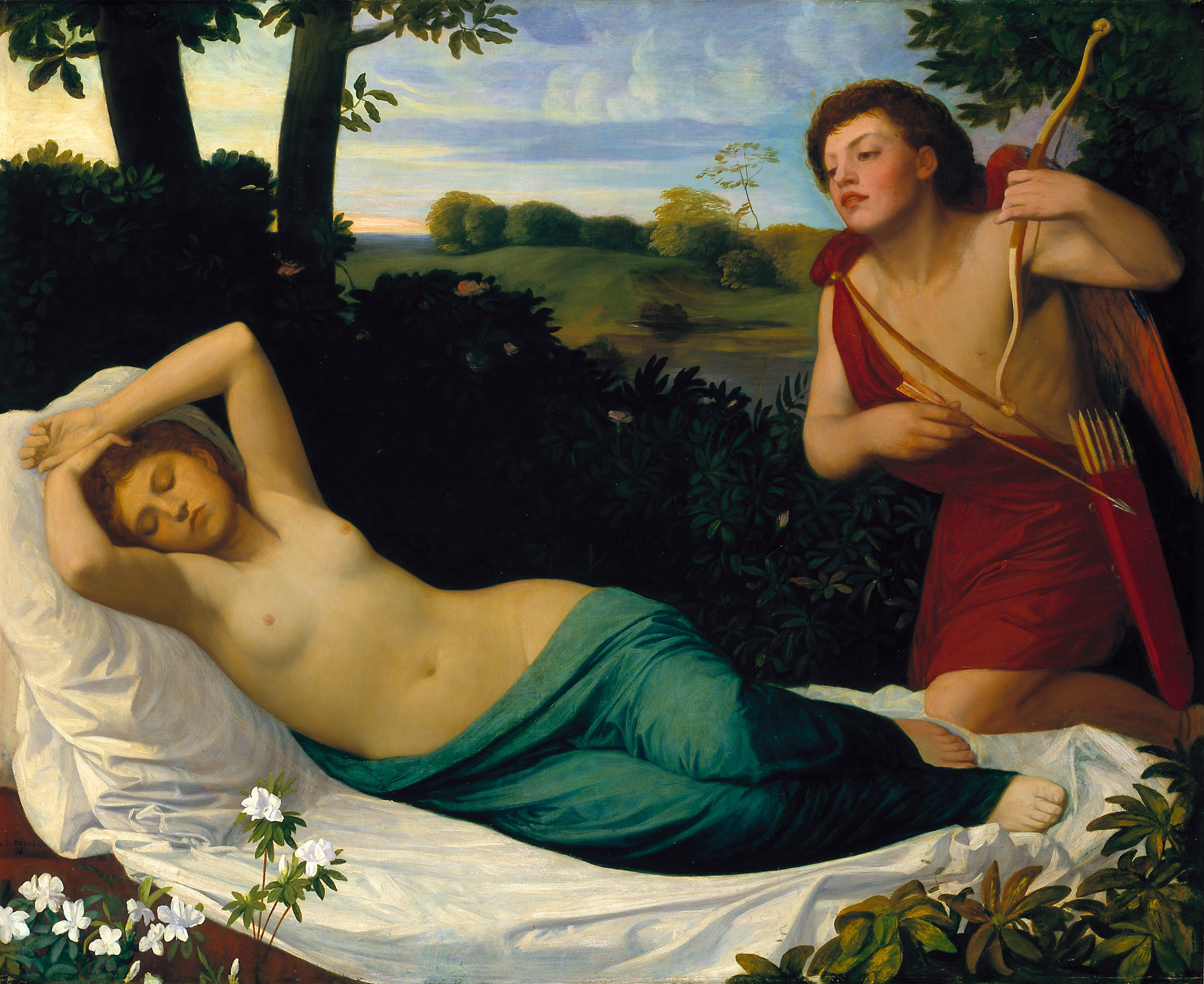
- Artist: Alphonse Legros
- Year: 1867
- Type: Oil on canvas, history painting
- Dimensions: 116.8 cm × 141.4 cm (46.0 in × 55.7 in)
- Location: Tate Britain; London

Cupid and Psyche is an 1867 history painting by the French-British artist Alphonse Legros. It depicts a scene from Greek Mythology and Ancient Roman literature based on the story of Cupid and Psyche. The composition of the reclining nude pays tribute to works by the Old Masters Giorgione and Titian.

The painting was displayed at the Royal Academy Exhibition of 1867 at the National Gallery in London, where the art critic Frederic George Stephens dismissed it as "a commonplace naked young woman". It received a much more positive appreciation from William Michael Rossetti. The painting is in the Tate Britain, having been bequeathed by Charles Holroyd, who has been a pupil of Legros, in 1918.

== Bibliography ==
- L'Enfant, Julie. Truth in Art; William Michael Rossetti and Nineteenth-century Realist Criticism. University of Minnesota, 1996.
- Smith, Alison. The Victorian Nude: Sexuality, Morality and Art. Manchester University Press, 1996
