= The Casella Sisters =

Artists and medallists

Ella Casella
- Born: Bertha Gabriella Casella; 3 January 1858; London
- Died: 3 September 1946 (aged 88); London

Academic background
- Education: Slade School of Art

Nelia Casella
- Born: Louisa Cornelia Casella; 23 July 1859; London
- Died: 29 April 1950 (aged 90); London

Academic background
- Education: Slade School of Art

Ella and Nelia Casella (1858-1946 and 1859-1950) were British artists, sculptors, and medalists, known for their collaborative work. Both sisters worked frequently in wax, creating portraits which are now held by the Victoria and Albert Museum. They worked together on a variety of illustrations and medal commissions.

== Career ==
Ella (3 January 1858 – 3 September 1946) and Nelia Casella (23 July 1859 – 29 April 1950) studied at the Slade School of Art under the tutelage of Alphonse Legros.

Commissions to the sisters were usually answered in correspondence by 'Miss Casella' and so it is difficult to know which sister was the correspondent.

=== Jackson-Gwilt Medal ===
In 1895, the Casella sisters were commissioned by the Royal Astronomical Society to create the medal for the Jackson-Gwilt Prize in Astronomy.

== Artwork ==
=== Ella Casella ===
- Relief of St. George and the Dragon, 1897, Victoria and Albert Museum
- Woman in Renaissance Costume, 1890-1900, Victoria and Albert Museum
- Stained holly wood box, 1900, Victoria and Albert Museum
- Euterpe, 1901

=== Nelia Casella ===
- Gilt and enamel bottle, 1892, Victoria and Albert Museum
- Man in Renaissance Costume, 1899, Victoria and Albert Museum
- Illustrations to Percy Pitt's score for Cinderella, 1900
- Boy Holding a Rose, 1903, Victoria and Albert Museum
- Carnations, 1907, Victoria and Albert Museum
- Silvia Bella, 1908, Victoria and Albert Museum
- Dante

=== Joint work by the Casella sisters ===
- Illustrations for 'Dreams, Dances and Disappointments' (1881) and 'The Maypole' (1882) by Gertrude A. Konstam
- The Charcot Medal, late 19th Century, examples in: Victoria and Albert Museum, British Museum
- The Jackson-Gwilt Medal, 1897
- Italian Renaissance Lady and Gentleman
