= Iris (car) =

British car company

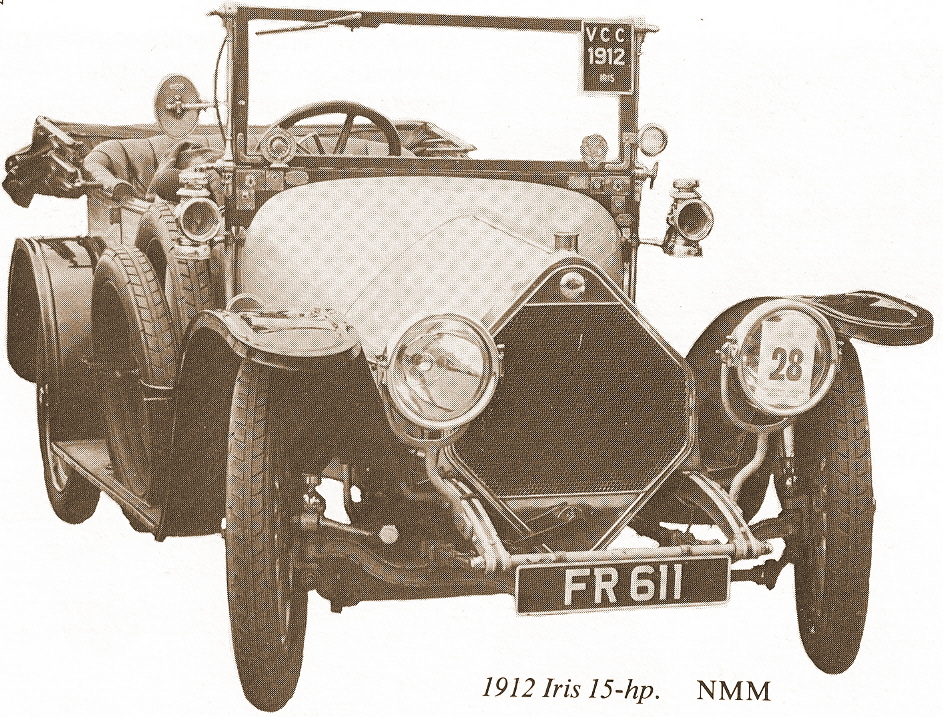
Iris 15 HP (1912)

Iris was a British car brand that was manufactured from 1906 to 1925 by Legros & Knowles Ltd in Willesden, London and Aylesbury, Buckinghamshire.

== History ==
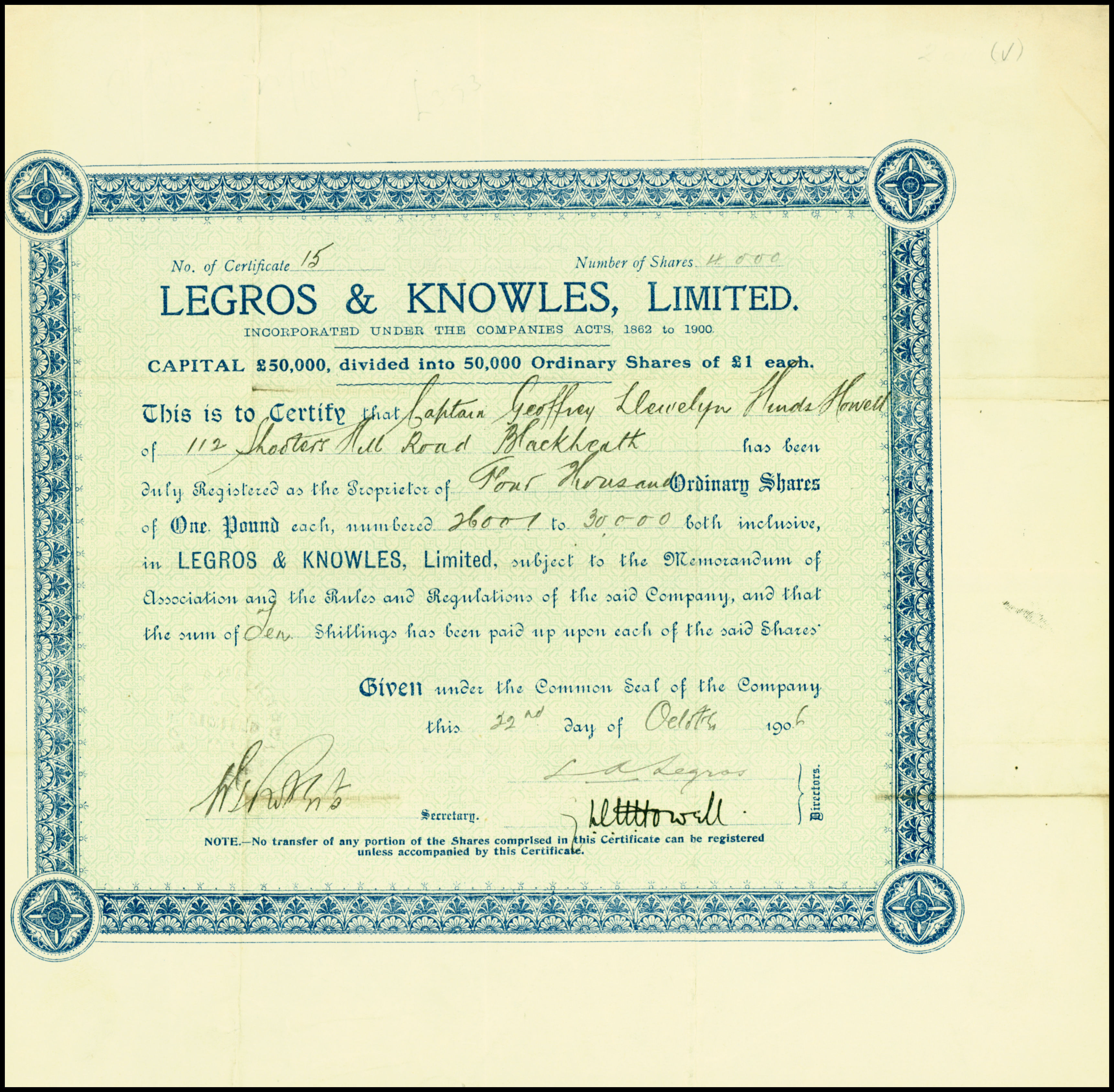
4,000 shares of Legros & Knowles Ltd, issued 22. October 1906

The Iris Motor Co, was established at Holland St, Brixton, London, in 1902. It made motorcycles until 1904 and later the Iris car.

=== Legros & Knowles ===
Lucien Alphonse Legros (1866–1933), O.B.E., M.I.Mech.E., M.I.C.E., son of the artist Alphonse Legros, and Guy Knowles, scion of a wealthy and artistic family, founded Legros & Knowles Ltd in Cumberland Park, Willesden Junction, Willesden, London in 1904 to build and repair vehicles. They had met while Knowles was studying art under Alphonze Legros. Knowles provided most of the financial capital while Legros, an older, experienced tramway engineer, was the main designer.

Two Legros & Knowles vehicles were shown at the 1904 Olympia Show, but they were cumbersome, outdated designs with chain drive, slow revving engines and magneto ignition. They were subsequently referred to as the 'Old Buggerinas'.

=== Iris Cars ===
From 1904, Legros & Knowles manufactured Iris cars.

In November 1905, a new Iris model appeared with shaft drive and the diamond shaped radiator. It was designed by Ivon M. de Havilland, elder brother of Sir Geoffrey de Havilland, who had been at Harrow school with Knowles ten years earlier. (Note - de Havilland died approximately a year later.) Also in 1905, some marine units were built, based on the original Legros engine design, one of which was installed in the motor yacht Iris at the Southampton trials.

By 1907, Frank T. Burgess was involved with the design at Iris. He later designed both the 1914 T.T. Humber and the 3 litre Bentley for W. O. Bentley.

In 1907, Iris Cars Ltd was founded as a distribution company for the production models. It collapsed in 1908 (or 1909).

The factory in Willesden was quite small, comprising a machine shop, engine room which drove all the machinery, the erecting shop with space for four chassis, and the blacksmith's shop. Upstairs, there was a light machine shop, fitting shop, parts store and pattern maker's shop. A separate building contained the office, the drawing office, and engine test-shop. There was no foundry. The total workforce was less than 60.

In 1908/9, Iris Cars Ltd opened showrooms in Marshall Street, off Oxford Street, London, which took over the marketing of all the production from Willesden.

In 1909, Legros and Knowles created a new Service department for Iris Cars Ltd, headquartered in Aylesbury and headed by George Augustus Mower. It was associated with Mower's Bifurcated Rivet and Tubular Rivet Company, on the Mandeville Road, Aylesbury.

C.K. Edwards was the Iris designer until 1911. In 1913, construction ceased in Willesden.

Production in Aylesbury stopped in 1915 with the outbreak of the First World War.

In 1919, the last vehicle was created but three models were offered until 1925. There is only a single known surviving vehicle, a British owned 1912 tourer registration FR 611 (pictured above).

=== Aero engine ===
In 1909, Sir Geoffrey de Havilland contracted Iris to build his first aero engine, the de Havilland Iris, a four-cylinder, liquid-cooled, horizontally opposed unit, which was displayed at the Aero Show in Olympia in March 2010.

=== Etymology ===
The car was named after the Greek goddess Iris, The Speedy Messenger of the Gods, who was portrayed on the badge of the early cars. By 1907, the advertising slogan was It Runs in Silence and this was implied as the origin of the name. From 1909, the logo, designed by Clive Harrington, showed green and blue Iris flowers.

== Vehicles ==
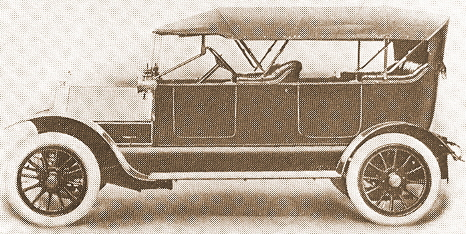
MHV Iris 25 hp Torpedo 1911

The only Legros & Knowles model had a four-cylinder engine with 20 hp power.

The Iris cars were luxury vehicles with large, water-cooled four-cylinder in-line engines. Between 1906 and 1908, a six-cylinder 40 HP was available, but it is probable that only one unit was built. A striking feature of all models was the diamond shaped radiator grille.

=== Models ===
Model	Construction	Cylinders	Capacity	Wheelbase
25/30 HP	1906–1915	Straight 4	4874 cm³	3048 mm
35/40 HP	1906–1915	Straight 4	6735 cm³	3048–3353 mm
40 HP	1906–1908	Straight 6	7311 cm³	3353 mm
New 25 HP	1909–1925	Straight 4	4874 cm³	3124 mm
New 35 HP	1909	Straight 4	6735 cm³	3048–3353 mm
15 HP	1910–1925	Straight 4	2292 cm³	2845 mm
15.9 HP	1914	Straight 4	2610 cm³	2845 mm
25 HP	1914–1925	Straight 4	4874 cm³	3200 mm

== See also ==
- de Havilland Iris - four-cylinder, horizontally opposed aero engine.
