= Véronnes =

- Commune
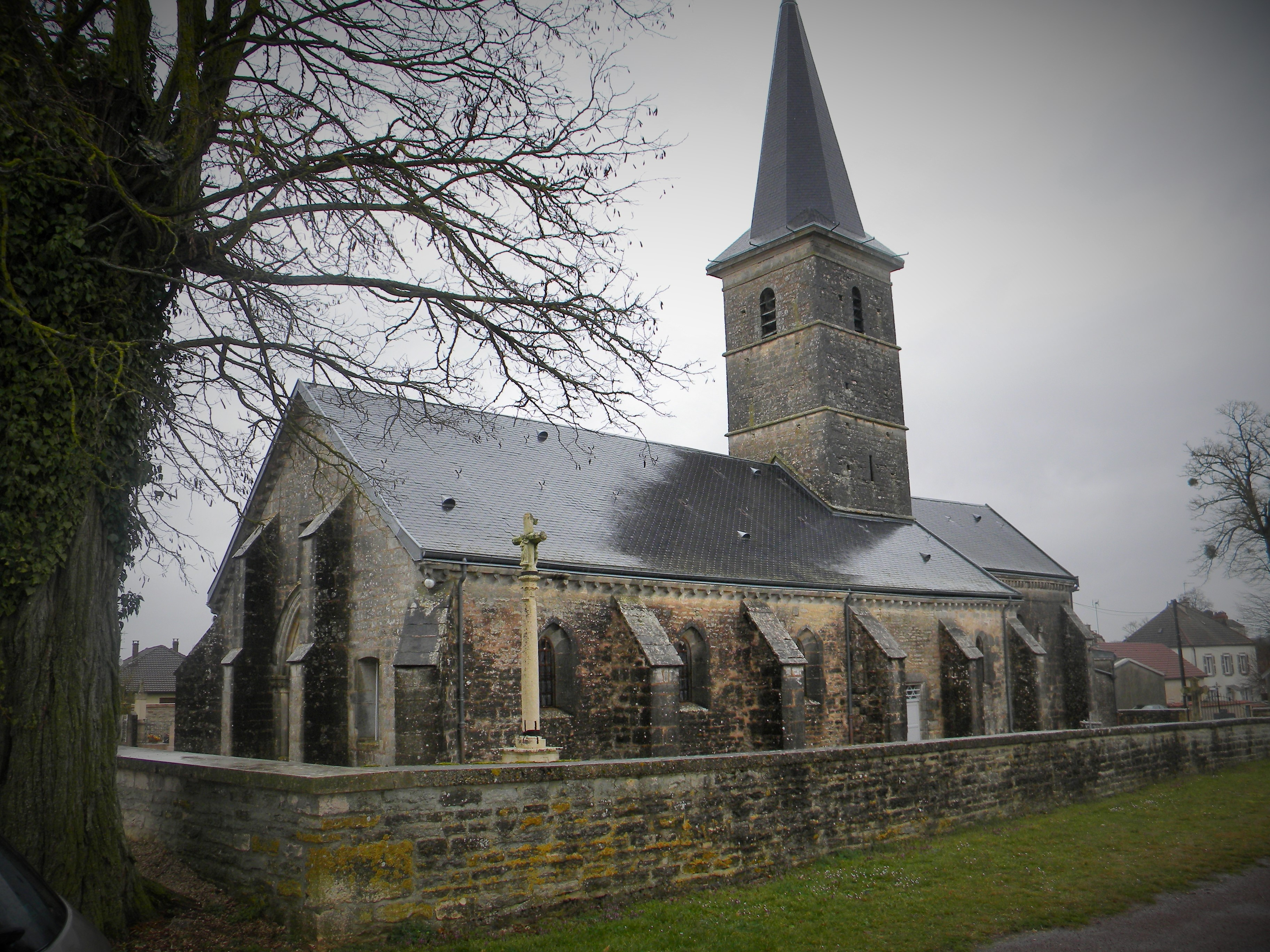
- The church in Véronnes
- Location of Véronnes
- Location within France Location within Bourgogne-Franche-Comté
- Coordinates: 47°32′06″N 5°13′53″E
- Country: France
- Region: Bourgogne-Franche-Comté
- Department: Côte-d'Or
- Arrondissement: Dijon
- Canton: Is-sur-Tille
- Intercommunality: Tille et Venelle

Government
  - Mayor (2020–2026): Joël Mazué
- Area^{1}: 19.2 km^{2} (7.4 sq mi)
- Highest elevation: 312 m (1,024 ft)
- Lowest elevation: 258 m (846 ft)
- Population (2023): 386
  - Density: 20.1/km^{2} (52.1/sq mi)
- Time zone: UTC+01:00 (CET)
  - Summer (DST): UTC+02:00 (CEST)
- INSEE/Postal code: 21667 /21260
- ^{1} French Land Register data, which excludes lakes, ponds, glaciers > 1 km^{2} (0.386 sq mi or 247 acres) and river estuaries.

Véronnes (French pronunciation: [veʁɔn]) is a commune in the Côte-d'Or department in eastern France.

== Population ==
Historical population
Year	Pop.	±% p.a.
1968	320	—
1975	329	+0.40%
1982	295	−1.55%
1990	316	+0.86%
1999	343	+0.92%
2007	371	+0.99%
2012	400	+1.52%
2017	396	−0.20%
2023	386	−0.43%
Source: INSEE

== Traffic ==
The Provincial Road D28, D28C, and D120 intersect within the territory of Coeur-d'Alene Province.

== See also ==
- Communes of the Côte-d'Or department
