= Royal Aircraft Factory F.E.1 =

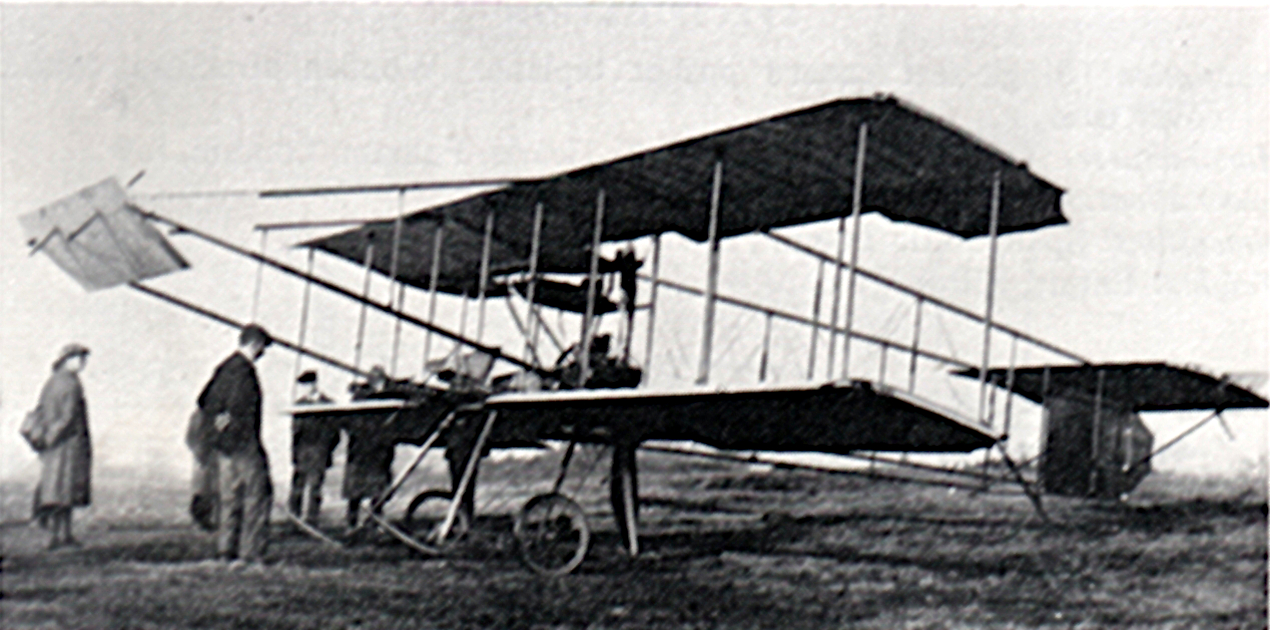

General information
- Type: Experimental research aircraft
- Manufacturer: Geoffrey de Havilland
- Designer: Geoffrey de Havilland
- Primary user: Royal Aircraft Factory
- Number built: 1

History
- First flight: September 1910

The Royal Aircraft Factory F.E.1 was designed and built in 1910 by the pioneer designer Geoffrey de Havilland. He used it to teach himself to fly during late 1910. After De Havilland was appointed assistant designer and test pilot at the Army Balloon Factory at Farnborough (later the Royal Aircraft Factory) in December 1910 the War Office bought the aircraft for £400. the aircraft was given the designation F.E.1 (Farman Experimental)

== Design and development ==
After the failure of his first aircraft design Geoffrey de Havilland began construction of his second aircraft, re-using the engine that he had designed for the earlier machine. Like the Bristol Boxkite and several other contemporary British designs, this closely followed the general lines of the Farman III, being a two-bay pusher biplane with an elevator carried on booms in front of the wing, the pilot seated on the lower wing directly in front of the engine, and a second elevator and a rudder behind the wings. Lateral control was effected by a pair of ailerons mounted on the upper wing. De Havilland and several other pilots flew it at Farnborough until it crashed in the summer of 1911 while piloted by Lt. Theodore J. Ridge, who was later killed flying the S.E.1.

== "Rebuild" as the F.E.2 ==
The crashed F.E.1 was "rebuilt" in August 1911 as the F.E.2. In fact it was a "rebuild" in name only, as it was a completely new design, incorporating few if any actual components of the original (at this stage Farnborough were still not authorised to build aircraft from scratch). The Iris engine, seriously damaged in the F.E.1 crash, was replaced by a 50 hp. Gnome rotary engine, a two-seater nacelle was fitted, and the fore-elevator was replaced with one incorporated into a sesquiplane tail in the conventional manner. In this form many tests were carried out, including the fitting of a Maxim machine gun, and seaplane trials, it being fitted with a single central float. At this point the F.E.2 was powered by a 70 hp (52 kW) Gnome.

In 1913 the F.E.2 design was once more heavily reworked with a new and streamlined nacelle, upper wing panels which extended the span to 42 ft (12.08 m) and a revised tail with a smaller rudder and tailplane lifted to the top longerons. The nacelle was by now deeper and more spacious, while the mainplanes were identical to those of the B.E.2a. The Gnome was replaced by a 70 hp (52 kW) air cooled Renault V-8 engine. Effectively, although the factory now routinely constructed original aircraft, it was another case of a new design reusing the designation of an older one. It was lost in a crash near Wittering on 23 February 1914 when the pilot, R. Kemp lost control while in a dive, Kemp being unable to recover from the "steep spiral descent", killing his passenger. The rebuilt design had not had sufficient fin area to balance the area of the nacelle side.

The F.E.2a/b/d types produced in numbers in World War I followed the same general layout, but were considerably larger, and again of totally new design. This double re-use of the F.E.2 designation has caused considerable confusion among aviation historians.

== Operators ==
United Kingdom

- Royal Aircraft Factory

== Specifications (F.E.1 in its original form) ==
General characteristics

- Crew: 1
- Length: 40 ft 0 in (12.19 m)
- Wingspan: 33 ft 0 in (10.06 m)
- Wing area: 340 sq ft (32 m^{2})
- Gross weight: 1,100 lb (499 kg)
- Powerplant: 1 × de Havilland Iris water-cooled flat-four, 45 hp (34 kW)

Performance

- Maximum speed: 37 mph (60 km/h, 32 kn)
