= Willesden =

Area of north-west London, England

Coordinates: 51.5468°N 0.2295°W

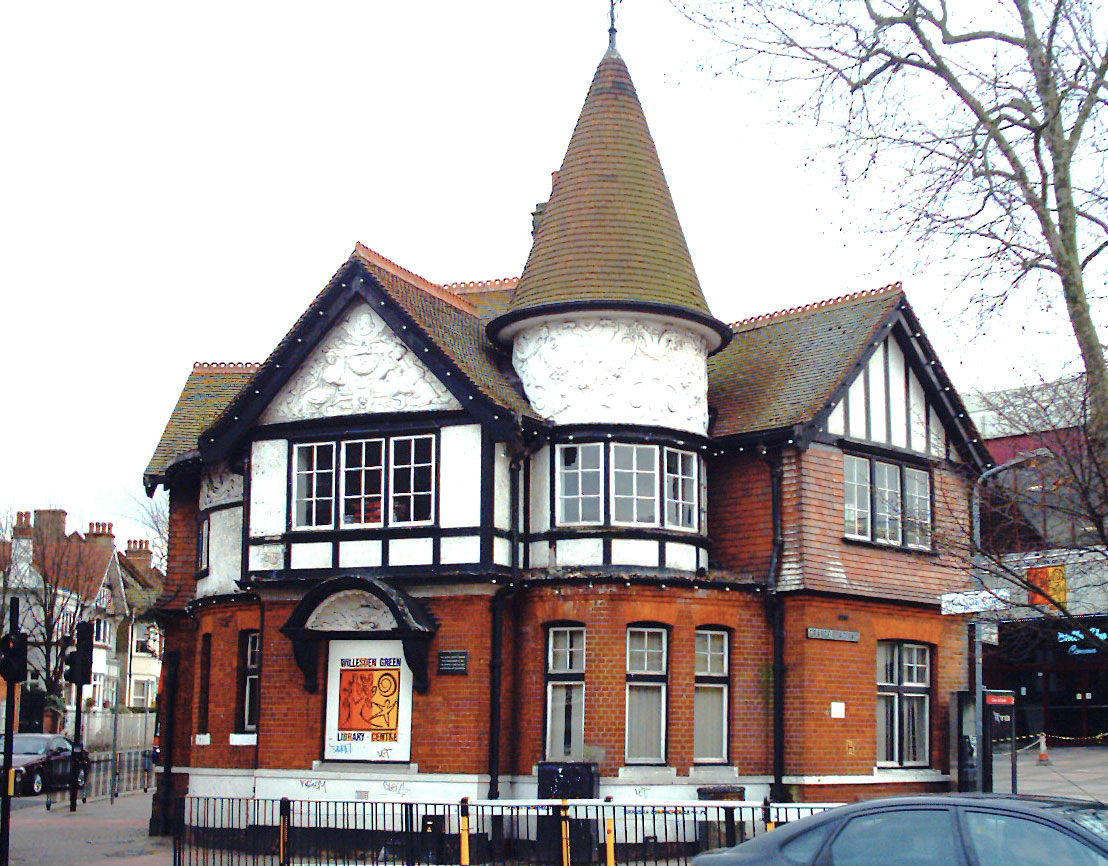
- Willesden Green Old Library Building

- Location within Greater London
- OS grid reference: TQ227846
- London borough: Brent
- Ceremonial county: Greater London
- Region: London
- Country: England
- Sovereign state: United Kingdom
- Post town: LONDON
- Postcode district: NW10, NW2
- Dialling code: 020
- Police: Metropolitan
- Fire: London
- Ambulance: London
- UK Parliament: Brent East
- London Assembly: Brent and Harrow

Willesden (/ˈwɪlzdən/) is an area of north-west London, situated 5 miles (8 km) west north-west of Charing Cross. It is historically a parish in the county of Middlesex that was incorporated as the Municipal Borough of Willesden in 1933; it has formed part of the London Borough of Brent in Greater London since 1965. Dollis Hill is also sometimes referred to as being part of Willesden.

With its close proximity to affluent neighbourhoods Brondesbury Park, Queen's Park and Kensal Rise, the area surrounding Willesden Green station has seen increased gentrification in the past several years, with rapidly rising property prices. The Daily Telegraph described Willesden Green as one of London's "new middle class" areas. The area has a population of 44,295, as of 2021, including the Willesden Green, Dollis Hill and Dudden Hill wards. Willesden Green has one of the city's highest Irish populations, and is also strongly associated with Afro-Caribbeans and Latin Americans.

Willesden is mostly in the NW10 postcode district, but part of it is in the NW2 postcode district.

== History ==
=== Etymology ===
The name derives from the Anglo-Saxon Willesdune, meaning the Hill of the Spring, and a Manor (landholding) bearing this name was recorded in 939 AD. The Domesday Book of 1086 records the manor as Wellesdone. However, on 19th century maps of the town such as those from the 'Ordnance Survey First Series', the town is shown as Wilsdon. The current spelling was adopted by the London and Birmingham Railway in 1844, when they opened a local station.

=== Early history ===
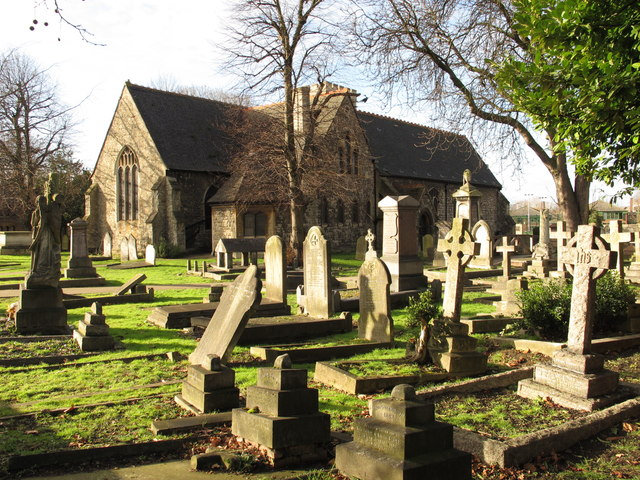
Church of St. Mary on Neasden Lane, Willesden

Willesden became a civil parish in the medieval period. From the 14th to 16th centuries, the town was a place of pilgrimage due to the presence of two ancient statues of the Virgin Mary at the Church of St Mary. One of these statues is thought to have been a Black Madonna, venerated as Our Lady of Willesden, which was insulted by the Lollards, taken to Thomas Cromwell's house and burnt in 1538 on a large bonfire of "notable images" including those of Our Lady of Walsingham, Our Lady of Worcester, and Our Lady of Ipswich. There was also a "holy well" which was thought to possess miraculous qualities, particularly for blindness and other eye disorders. Much of the district supplied apples, pears and vegetables to the city of London for many years from the early years of the industrial revolution.

=== Industrial history ===
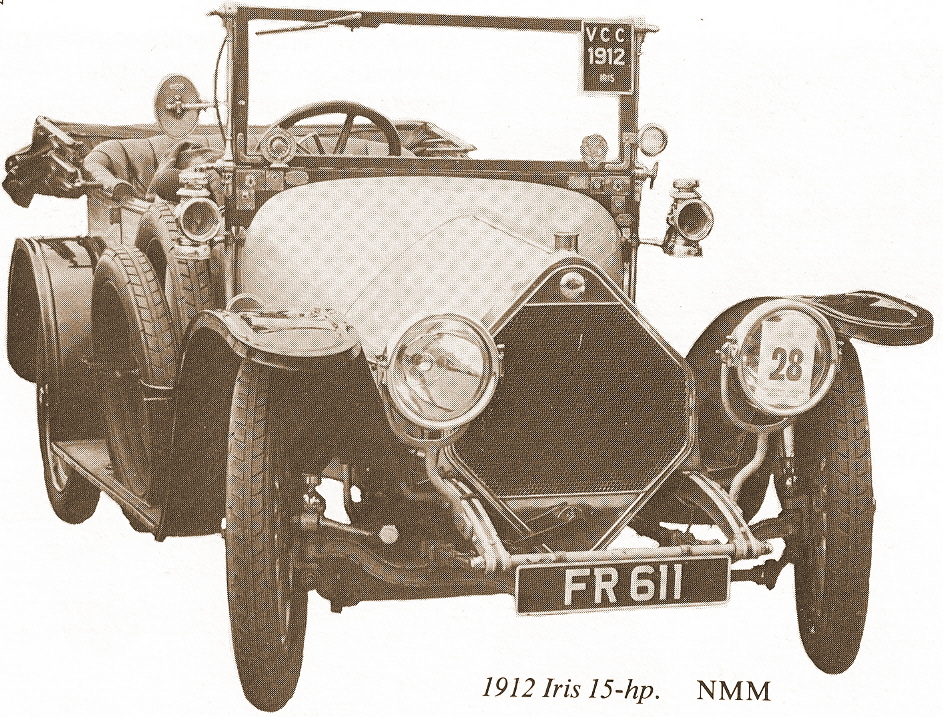
Iris 15 HP (1912)

The Iris was a British car brand that was manufactured from 1906 by Legros & Knowles Ltd in Willesden. Lucien Alphonse Legros (1866–1933), son of the artist Alphonse Legros, and Guy Knowles, scion of a wealthy and artistic family, founded Legros & Knowles Ltd in Cumberland Park, Willesden Junction, in 1904 to build and repair vehicles.

=== Modern history ===
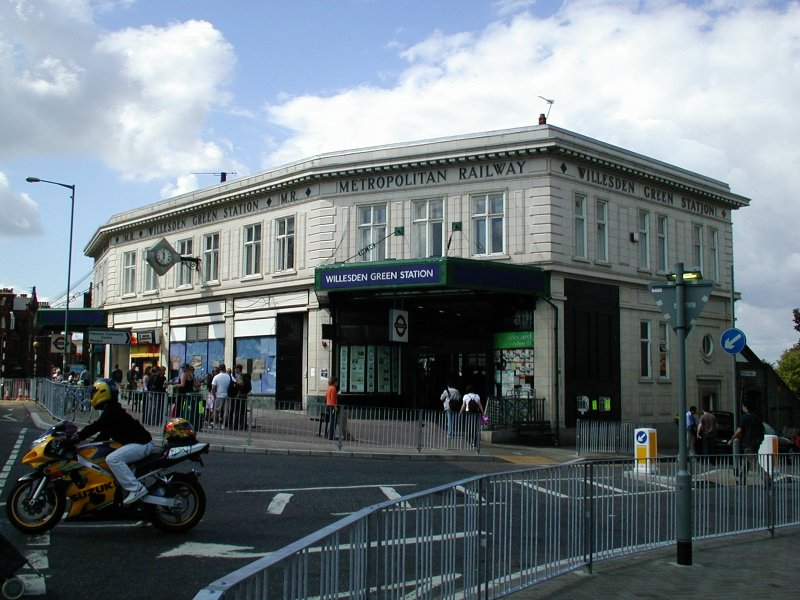
Willesden Green station opened in 1879

The parish of Willesden remained predominantly rural up until 1875, when its population was 18,500. It included the villages and hamlets of Brondesbury, Dollis Hill, Dudden Hill, Harlesden, Kilburn, Mapesbury, Oxgate and Stonebridge. However, this changed with the opening of the Metropolitan Railway (later the Metropolitan line) station of Willesden Green on 24 November 1879. By 1906 the population had grown to 140,000. In the 1920's this growth would be repeated in neighbouring areas such as Harrow. The Metropolitan line service was withdrawn in 1940, when the station was served by the Bakerloo line, and later the Jubilee line.

The First World War caused Willesden to change from a predominantly middle class suburb to a working class part of London. After the war, Willesden grew rapidly as many factories opened up with numerous flats and terraced houses. The local council encouraged building to prevent large unemployment and decline. To the present day, Willesden has been shaped by the patterns of migration which marks it out as one of the most diverse areas in the United Kingdom. City of London Corporation records show that the first black person recorded in Brent was Sarah Eco, who was christened in St. Mary's Church in Willesden on 15 September 1723. The 1901 United Kingdom census recorded that 42% of the population was born in London. In 1923, the specialist coach builder Freestone and Webb established their base in Willesden, producing bespoke cars on Rolls-Royce and Bentley chassis until 1956.

Willesden became a municipal borough in 1933, and it is at this time that the area became predominantly working class. A small Irish community had formed in Willesden by this time, which grew rapidly during the period of the Second World War. A small Jewish community of refugees from Europe also formed during the war, with 3.5% of the population in 1951 born in Germany, Poland, Russia or Austria. During the war, Willesden suffered large bombing damage due to the heavy concentration of manufacturing industry, such as munition factories, the location of 'Smiths Instruments" (Used defensive aircraft instrumentation). Mulliner-Park Ward (Coach builders to Rolls-Royce and Bentley, hand built cars). Power Station location, canal and major railway locomotive overhaul facilities located in the area.

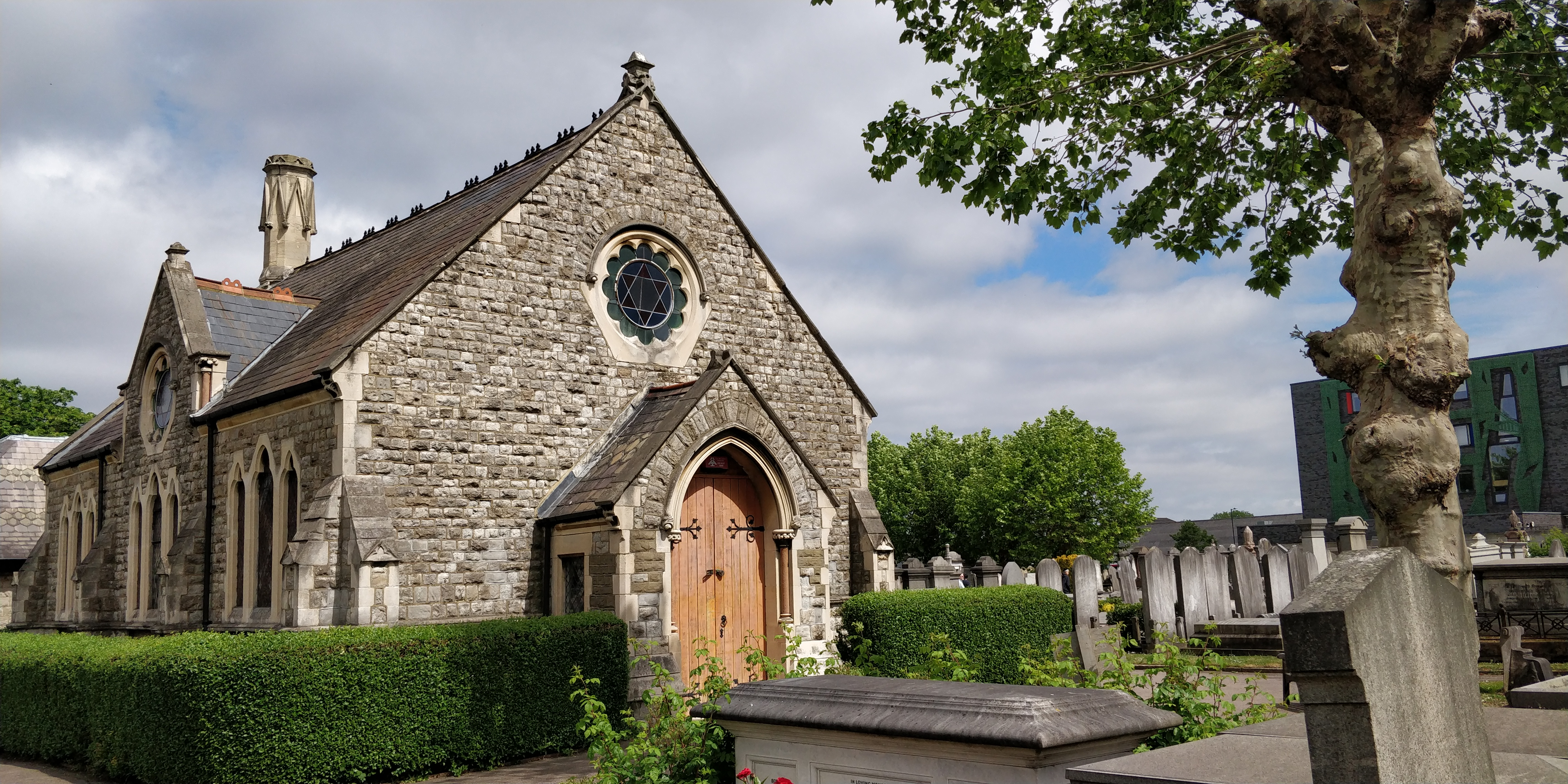
The prayer hall of Willesden Jewish Cemetery

The period from 1960 saw migrants settling from the Caribbean and the Indian subcontinent. Additionally, from 1963 it was the site of the Kuo Yuan, the first Chinese restaurant to serve Pekinese dishes in Britain. Since the 1960s, Willesden has been popular with young working holidaymakers from Canada, Australia and New Zealand, although this popularity has declined somewhat in favour of other areas since about 2003.

Willesden went into a period of decline during the 1970s and 1980s as much of the housing was inadequate due to overcrowding as industry was mixed with housing. The whole of central Willesden (bar the area by the Willesden Green station) was earmarked for redevelopment; however, this did not come to fruition. In the late 1980s, traders were given money to revamp the High Street to prevent shops closing.

The area surrounding Willesden Green station has become more middle-class and gentrified with marked property price rises in 2014 and 2015.

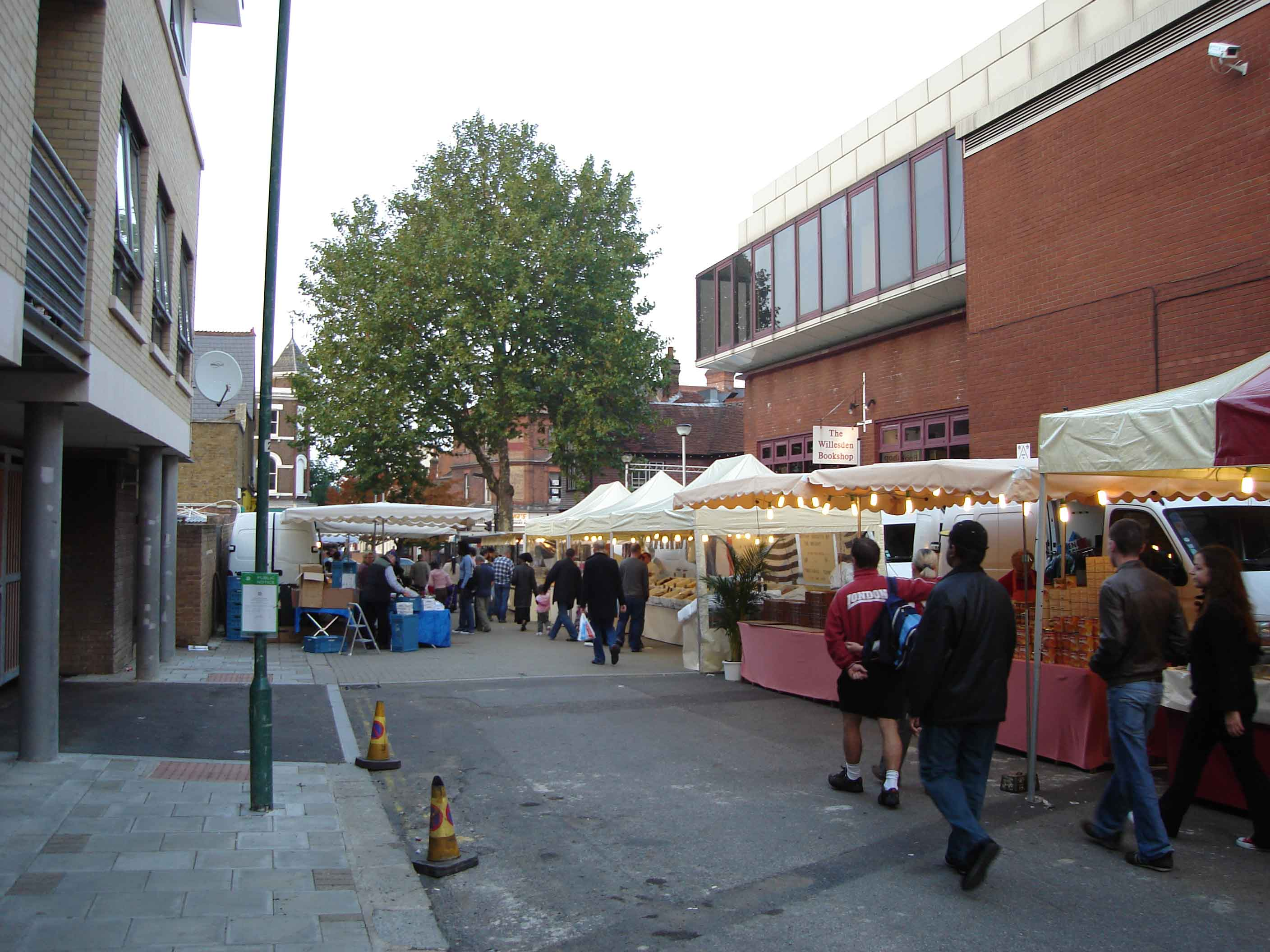
Willesden French Market

== Politics ==
The Willesden Green ward is represented on Brent Council by three Labour councillors, Janice Long, Saqlain Choudry, and Tom Miller.

Willesden forms part of the Brent East parliamentary constituency and is home to the local Labour Party MP Dawn Butler.

== Demographics ==
According to the 2011 census, the Willesden Green ward had a population of 15,587. Ethnically, 22% of the population was Other White, followed by 20% White British, 8.2% Other Asian, 8.1% Black African and 7.1% Black Caribbean. 52.7% were BAME. The most spoken foreign language is Portuguese. 2,621 of the tenure households were privately rented; 1,625 were socially rented; 1,540 were owned.

== Geography ==
Roundwood Park is on the south-western side while Gladstone Park is nearby to the north of Willesden. It lies about 130 feet (40 m) to 200 feet (60 m) above sea level.

== Transport ==
=== Rail and tube ===
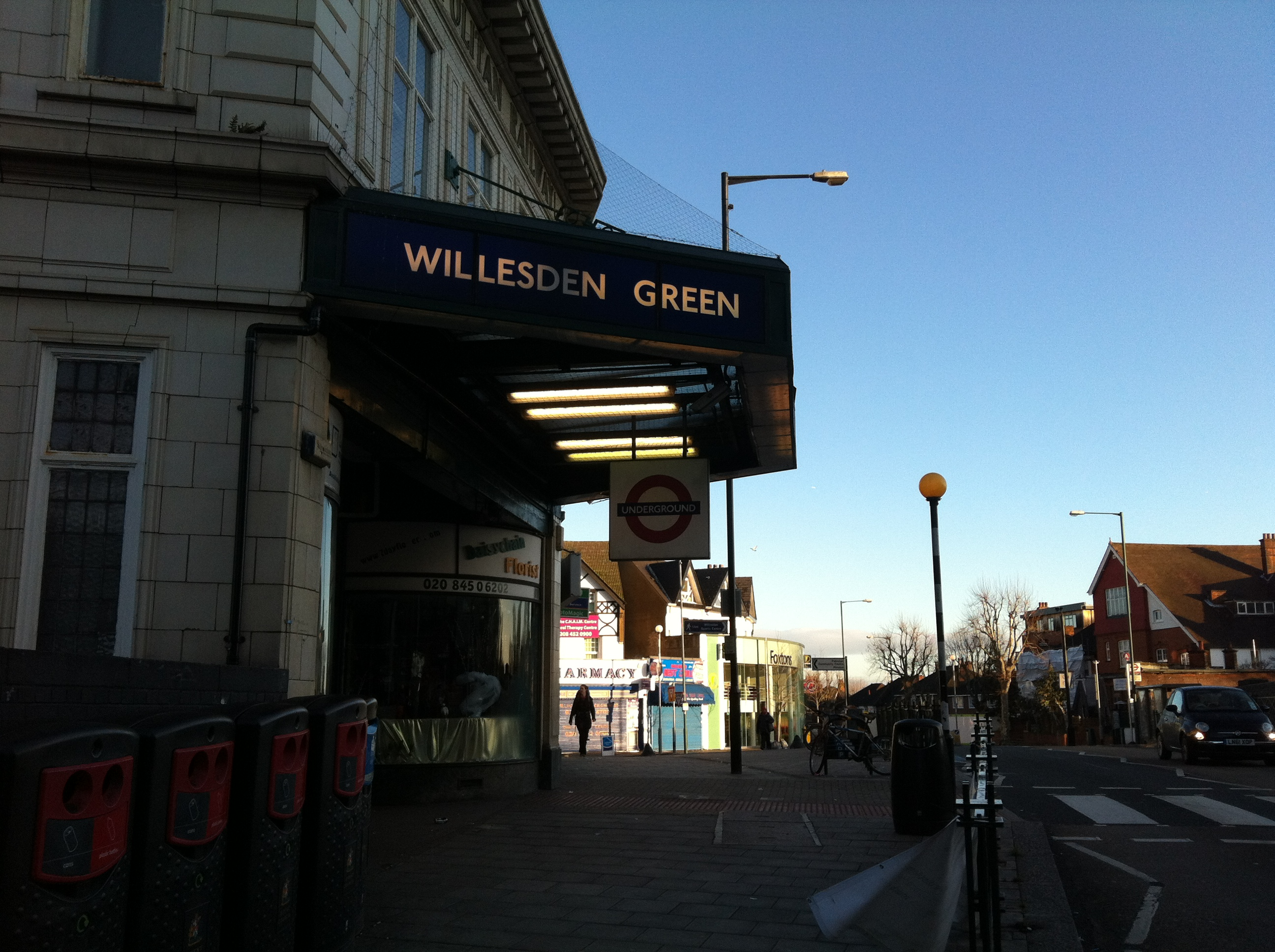
Willesden Green station

The area is served by three stations:

- Dollis Hill tube station (Jubilee line)
- Willesden Green tube station (Jubilee line)
- Willesden Junction station (Bakerloo line and London Overground).

Three London Underground lines pass through Willesden:

- Jubilee line: this connects the area directly to Stanmore via Wembley Park northbound, and to Central London southbound. Key southbound destinations include Baker Street, Bond Street, Westminster, Waterloo and Canary Wharf. Most southbound services terminate at Stratford.
- Bakerloo line: northbound trains from Willesden Junction terminate at nearby Stonebridge Park, with some continuing towards Wembley Central and Harrow & Wealdstone. Southbound services also pass through Central London, with trains to Paddington, Marylebone, Baker Street, Oxford Circus, Waterloo and Elephant & Castle.
- Metropolitan line: trains pass through Willesden Green and Dollis Hill, but do not stop; this has not always been the case. Willesden Green station was opened by the Metropolitan Railway in 1879; the area owes much of its development to it and to Metro-land. Today, passengers from Willesden can access the Metropolitan line by using the Jubilee line and changing at either Wembley Central to the north or Finchley Road to the south.

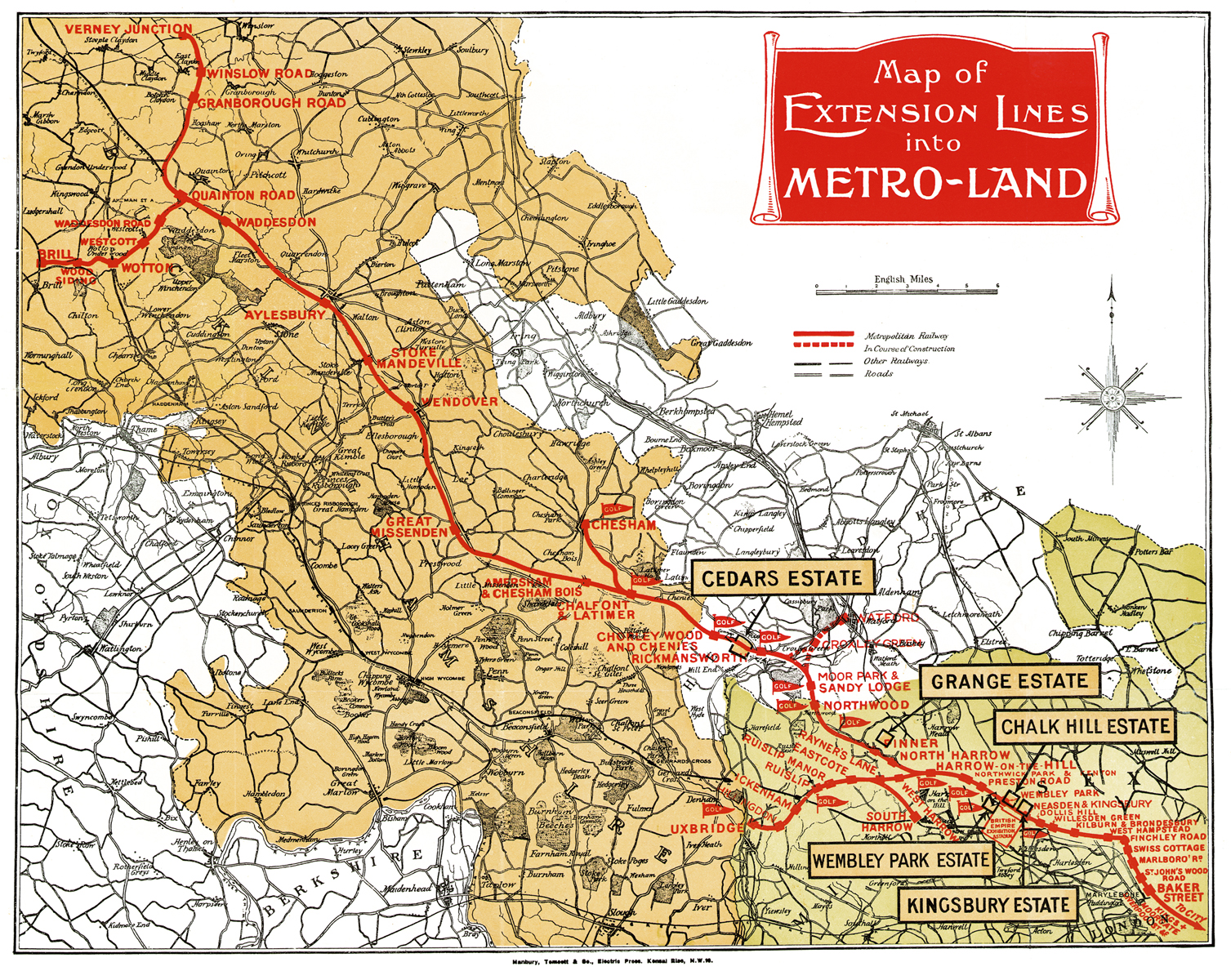
Map of Metro-land, showing the Metropolitan Railway passing through Willesden (1924)

One National Rail station, Willesden Junction, is served by three London Overground routes:

Line	Direction	Terminus	Calling at...
Watford DC line	Northbound	Watford Junction	Harlesden, Stonebridge Park, Wembley Central, North Wembley, South Kenton, Kenton, Harrow & Wealdstone, Headstone Lane, Hatch End, Carpenders Park, Bushey, Watford High Street
Watford DC line	Southbound	Euston	Kensal Green, Queen's Park, Kilburn High Road, South Hampstead
North London line	Eastbound	Stratford	Kensal Rise, Brondesbury Park, Brondesbury, West Hampstead, Finchley Road & Frognal, Hampstead Heath, Gospel Oak, Kentish Town West, Camden Road, Caledonian Road & Barnsbury, Highbury & Islington, Canonbury. Dalston Kingsland, Hackney Central, Homerton, Hackney Wick
North London line	Westbound	Richmond	Acton Central, South Acton, Gunnersbury, Kew Gardens
West London line	Westbound	Clapham Junction	Shepherd's Bush, Kensington Olympia, West Brompton, Imperial Wharf

Stations in Willesden straddle London fare zones 2 and 3.

=== Road ===
Several key routes pass through or around Willesden:

Route	Road	Southbound/Westbound	Northbound/Eastbound
A219	Scrubs Lane	White City Shepherd's Bush Hammersmith	-
A404	Harrow Road/Manor Park Road	Kensal Paddington	Wembley Harrow
A406	North Circular Road	Ealing M4 for Heathrow Chiswick	Brent Cross M1 for Luton Finchley M11 for Stansted
A407	High Road	Willesden Junction	Cricklewood Golders Green
A4000	Old Oak Lane	Acton	-
A4003	Willesden Lane	-	Kilburn
A4088	Dudding Hill Lane	-	Wembley
A5	Shoot Up Hill	Kilburn Maida Vale Paddington Marble Arch	Cricklewood M1 for Luton Brent Cross Edgware

=== Buses ===
A large bus garage was built in 1902 and so many bus routes start or run through the town. Queen Elizabeth II visited it during her Golden Jubilee celebrations.

London Buses routes serving Willesden are: 6, 52, 98, 206, 226, 260, 266, 297, 460 and N98.

=== Cycling ===
To the north of Willesden, Quietway 3 runs unbroken between Gladstone Park and Shoot Up Hill on quiet, residential streets. The route is coordinated by Transport for London (TfL) and is planned to extend eastbound into West Hampstead towards Regent's Park.

A direct, traffic-free cycle route runs to the south of Willesden along the Grand Union Canal towpath. Cyclists share the route with pedestrians, but the towpath provides cyclists with an unbroken, traffic-free connection to Paddington. From Paddington, cyclists can access further Central London destinations using traffic-free Cycle Superhighway 3.

== Notable people from Willesden Green ==
- Ronald Coase (1910–2013), Nobel Prize winner in economics
- Graham Cole, actor
- Ernest Eldridge (1897–1935), racing driver
- E. L. James, author
- Jeanette (Spanish singer) was born in Willesden in 1951
- John Neville (1925–2011), actor
- Ben Smith, an underground British rapper who goes by the name Doc Brown. He is featured on the track "Think Back" from the album The Enthusiast produced by the British DJ Evil Ed. He raps "Born and bred in Kilburn" but also says "Veteran Willesden tenant. Brent the borough of residence."
- J. Keighley Snowden (1860–1947), author and journalist who lived and died here
- Kelvin Krash, trap music producer
- Janet Kay, Reggae singer
- Zadie Smith, novelist

== Popular culture ==
- Emma Thompson's character in Last Chance Harvey mentions she lives in Willesden Green.
- The town was featured in the novels White Teeth and NW by Zadie Smith, published in 2000 and 2012 respectively; the former was also later adapted as a television serial.
- Joe Strummer and the Mescaleros song from "Willesden to Cricklewood" on their album Rock Art and the X-ray Style.
- Willesden is the origin of the formation of the 1980s breakdance group the Willesden Dodgers with Pete Q. Harris, Nigel Green and Richard Jon Smith as the main members.
- "Willesden Green" is the title of a song written by Ray Davies and performed by the Kinks, and is included in the soundtrack of the 1971 film Percy. Lyrics from the song:

Well I tried to settle down Fulham Broadway
And I tried to make my home in Golders Green
But I gotta get that train
And go back home again
Oh how I miss the folks back home in Willesden Green

You know, I tried, I really tried to settle in this big city
And I always thought I could make it all on my very own
But there's one thing that keeps calling me
To that little, that little semi-detached
That's the folks, yeah, the folks back home
In Willesden Green

- Willesden Green is a running reference/joke on the animated TV cartoon series Danger Mouse.
- The Last Detective (2002) was set and filmed in and around Willesden and used the Rising Sun pub as its central location.
- Jonathan Creek is regularly filmed around Willesden.
- The Bonzo Dog Doo-Dah Band make a short reference to Willesden Green on their track "Shirt", the second track of their 1969 album Tadpoles quote: "Now, here in Willesden Green, yes, brrr, it is a bit chilly but no matter. Here comes a gentleman and we're going to talk to him about shirts."
- Lead Balloon, a BBC4 sitcom starring Jack Dee, is filmed principally in Willesden.
- A static inverter plant of HVDC Kingsnorth was located in Willesden.
- In the book The Curious Incident of the Dog in the Night-Time, Christopher's mother lives in Willesden.
- Willesden was the first home of Jive Records. It remained there for many years while growing into an international music company, which released the music of such artists as Whodini, DJ Jazzy Jeff & the Fresh Prince, and Britney Spears. It was eventually acquired by Bertelsmann Music Group and relocated to New York.
- The family who share their house with a ghost in the 1992 BBC Sitcom So Haunt Me lived on Meadow Road, Willesden.
- On the popular 1980s/90s TV show Minder, Arthur Daley had a lock-up full of questionable merchandise located in Willesden. He also orchestrated many of his dodgy deals in the area and other parts of northwest London. In the episode "Willesden Suite", Arthur finds himself caught up in the web of a dishonest manager whilst supplying a hotel with dodgy gear.
- Willesden was once home to Morgan Studios, where many well-known rock albums by artists such as Yes, Led Zeppelin, and Supertramp were produced. Morgan Studios was the first to use 24-track recording.
- In Nines' "Can't Blame Me" music video, the rapper can be seen wheelie-ing on his pedal bike down Willesden Lane outside the launderette where he washes his millions.
- French novelist Louis-Ferdinand Céline's posthumous London Bridge: Guignol's Band II tells the story of Colonel O'Cologhan, whose mansion is situated in Willesden.

== See also ==
- St Matthew's Church, Willesden
- Willesden Jewish Cemetery
- Liberal Jewish Cemetery, Willesden
