= Ralph Marcus Hare =

- Born: Ralph Marcus Hare; 18 August 1914; Radlett, Hertfordshire, England
- Died: 4 May 2009 (aged 94); Hertfordshire, England
- Resting place: Hatfield, Hertfordshire
- Spouse: Margery Hare
- Children: Malcolm Carlton Hare; Marian Nicholls; Juliet Moyce
- Parents: Mr Hare (father); Mrs Hare (mother)

Ralph Marcus Hare (1914–2009) was a British aircraft engineer. He was a longtime engineer at the aviation firm de Havilland and worked on the production and development of the de Havilland Mosquito.

== Early life ==
Hare was born in Radlett, Hertfordshire on 18 August 1914, the oldest of eight children. He was apprenticed (1928) to De Havilland at Stag Lane. He worked in wood and won a scholarship to become a student (1934) in the DH Technical School where he learnt about design. He was transferred to the main Drawing Office at Hatfield where he was given stressing work. He worked completely alone in stressing the wings of the DH Hornet Moth; a job which he finished in 3 1/2 months. He advanced very quickly, lecturing at the Technical School from 1936 to 1952.

His strengths were recognised and he was chosen, in 1939, to join the initial nine-man team working on overall loads and wing strengths calculations in secret at Salisbury Hall, when the Mosquito plans went under way as authorised by Sir Geoffrey De Havilland. It was a team of which he was the youngest member; it included the chief test pilot, John Cunningham (Cat's Eyes). The work involved using wood, especially Canadian balsa wood, which made the Mosquito the lightest and fastest plane of its time.

== De Havilland ==
Ralph was made Chief Stressman of De Havilland in 1955, Deputy Chief Structural Engineer in 1967 and Chief Structural Engineer in 1971, taking charge of all four structural departments, as the company changed from being De Havilland to Hawker Siddeley, then to British Aerospace.

During his half-century of working with DH and its successors at Hatfield, Hare worked on designs for over 40 different aircraft including the Albatross, Flamingo, Vampire, Hornet, Comet, Trident, Airbus wings together with the Consortium in Toulouse and finally the BAe 146. He was an able mathematician, who used a slide rule for calculations.

Hare went to the Comet air disasters. After BOAC Flight 783, Hare was quoted as saying "We have not attempted to form any theories on the disaster." Eventually the crashes were attributed to faults in the fuselage (windows), rather the wings which were his responsibility. He represented British Industry on the Joint Airworthiness Requirements for Europe (J.A.R.) Structures Committee for nine years from its inception in 1970, and served on several Industry Committees.

== Retirement ==
Hare retired in 1980. He died on 4 May 2009 at the age of 94 and was buried in Hatfield Cemetery.
