= De Havilland DH.52 =

DH.52
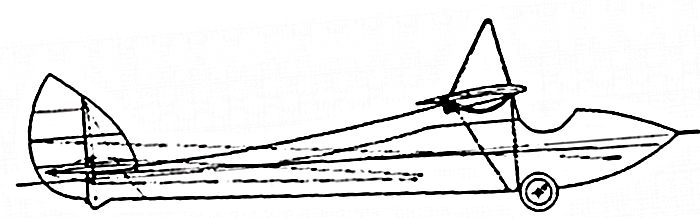

General information
- Type: single seat glider
- National origin: United Kingdom
- Manufacturer: de Havilland Aircraft Co. Ltd
- Number built: 2

History
- First flight: 5 October 1922
- Retired: 19 October 1922

The de Havilland DH.52 was a single-seat, high-winged glider produced as an entrant to a 1922 prize competition. Two were built but insufficient torsional stiffness in the wings led to control problems and the DH.52 was rapidly abandoned.

== Development ==
The DH.52 was de Havilland's only glider, built to compete for the £1,000 (equivalent to £68,974 in 2023) prize in the Daily Mail Gliding Competition, held at Itford, Sussex in 1922. It was a high-wing monoplane with an aspect ratio of 11.4; the wing was wire braced, with pairs of wires from the keel to the front and rear wing spars at about 1/3 and 3/4 span. Similar pairs of wires to a central king post supported the weight of the wings and kept the bracing in tension. The kingpost consisted of two members, one from each wing spar at the centre line, meeting about 2 feet 9 inches (0.84 m) above the wing. The resulting triangular structure appears to have been covered with cambric. Unbalanced ailerons with an unusually large angular travel were fitted, in order to maintain control at low speeds.

The square section fuselage was built from cross braced spruce longerons and covered with 0.04-inch (1.0 mm) plywood. At the nose these longerons curved together, giving the glider a slight boat-like look. The single seat cockpit was just in front and below the wing. There was a cambric fairing round the cockpit and also behind the wing to the tail, the latter made by stretching the material over a wire that ran from the wing mounting to the rear fuselage. The fin and generous rudder were a slightly pointed version of the characteristic de Havilland shape; the elevator area was also large compared with that of the fixed tailplane.

Two DH.52s were built. The first machine (competition no.4) had a single cross axle, strutted undercarriage for its first flight on 5 October 1922, but this was replaced by a pair of smaller wheels mounted close to the fuselage sides on an axle fixed to the lower longerons. The second (no. 33) had this undercarriage from the start.

Both aircraft flew in the competition on 16 October with rubber rope launches. They each flew for about 2 1/2 mins, but both were damaged on landing. Both showed problems with lateral control, the wings twisting under the aileron loads, cancelling their effects. No. 33 was flying again three days later, now with wing warping to try to beat the control problems, but the wing twisted so much after tow release that the centre section failed and the aircraft was lost The pilot was not seriously hurt, but it was clear the torsional stiffness of the wing was insufficient and nothing could be done about within the competition time limits, so no more flights were made and the two DH.52s were scrapped.

== Specifications ==
Data from Jackson 1978, pp. 202

General characteristics

- Crew: 1
- Length: 27 ft 0 in (8.23 m)
- Wingspan: 50 ft 0 in (15.24 m)
- Wing area: 220.0 sq ft (20.44 m^{2})
- Aspect ratio: 11.35
- Airfoil: RAF 15 (modified)
- Empty weight: 250 lb (113.4 kg)
- Gross weight: 400 lb (181.4 kg)

Performance

- Stall speed: 18 mph (29 km/h, 16 kn)
- Wing loading: 2.00 lb/sq ft (9.75 kg/m^{2})
