= De Havilland =

1920–1963 aircraft manufacturer

de Havilland Aircraft Company Limited
- Industry: Aerospace
- Founded: 1920
- Founder: Geoffrey de Havilland
- Defunct: 1963
- Fate: Incorporated into Hawker Siddeley
- Headquarters: Hatfield, Hertfordshire, England
- Key people: Ronald Eric Bishop; Ralph Marcus Hare; Charles Timothy Wilkins
- Products: Civil and military aircraft, aero engines, guided weapons
- Parent: Hawker Siddeley (from 1959)
- Subsidiaries: de Havilland Canada (1928); de Havilland Australia (1927); Airspeed Ltd. (1940–1951); De Havilland Propellers (1935–1961); de Havilland Engine Company (1944–1961)

The de Havilland Aircraft Company Limited (pronounced /də ˈhævɪlənd/, də HAVI-lənd) was a British aviation manufacturer established in late 1920 by Geoffrey de Havilland at Stag Lane Aerodrome Edgware on the outskirts of North London. Operations were later moved to Hatfield in Hertfordshire.

Known for its innovation, de Havilland was responsible for a number of important aircraft, including the Moth biplane which revolutionised aviation in the 1920s; the 1930s Fox Moth, a commercial light passenger aircraft; the wooden World War II Mosquito multirole aircraft; and the pioneering passenger jet airliner Comet.

The de Havilland company became a member of the Hawker Siddeley group in 1960, but lost its separate identity in 1963. Later, Hawker Siddeley merged into what is eventually known today as BAE Systems, the British aerospace and defence business. The de Havilland name lives on in De Havilland Canada, which owns the rights to the name and the aircraft produced by de Havilland's former Canadian subsidiary, including the Dash 8 regional airliner previously produced by Bombardier Aerospace.

== History ==
=== Origins ===
In January 1920, Geoffrey de Havilland was working for Airco as technical director and chief designer. Airco were in poor financial position after the war with a lack of demand for civilian aircraft. BSA bought Airco on 20 January 1920 from George Holt Thomas on the say-so of one BSA director, Percy Martin, in order to acquire their factories and equipment, BSA having no interest in aviation. The resulting losses were so great BSA was unable to pay a dividend for the next three years.

With Thomas's help, de Havilland took modest premises at the nearby Stag Lane Aerodrome and formed a limited liability company, de Havilland Aircraft Company Limited, incorporated 26 September 1920. The directors were de Havilland, Arthur Edwin Turner who had come from the War Office, and chief engineer Charles Clement Walker. Nominal capital was £50,000. Most of the capital came from Geoffrey de Havilland (£3,000) and George Holt Thomas (£10,000), with various others adding a further £1,000. As well as securing release from any contractual obligations to BSA, alongside other Airco assets de Havilland bought the Airco DH.18, two DH.14s and repair work on the DH.9 from BSA. Thomas' contribution was contingent on A E Turner, Airco's financial manager, becoming chairman.

Banking on an order worth about £2,500 originally intended for Airco de Havilland brought his close-knit team in from Airco: friends Charles Clement Walker (aerodynamics and stressing), Wilfred E. Nixon (company secretary), Francis E. N. St. Barbe (business and sales) and from Airco's experimental department, Frank T Hearle (works manager). Hugh Burroughes went to the Gloster Aircraft Company. The fledgling enterprise was lucky to be approached the next year by a man wanting a new aeroplane built for him, Alan Samuel Butler. He invested heavily in the business. The first year's turnover was £32,782 and net profit £2,387 and in early 1922 they bought Stag Lane aerodrome for £20,000. They survived until 1925 when de Havilland's own design, the Moth (first flown 22 February 1925) proved to be just what the flying world was waiting for. In 1928, de Havilland Aircraft Company Limited went public.

Initially de Havilland concentrated on single and two-seat biplanes, continuing the DH line of aircraft built by Airco but adapting them for airline use, but then they introduced a series of smaller aircraft powered by de Havilland's own Gipsy engines. These included the Gipsy Moth and Tiger Moth. These aircraft set many aviation records, many piloted by de Havilland himself. Amy Johnson flew solo from England to Australia in a Gipsy Moth in 1930.

The Moth series of aeroplanes continued with the more refined Hornet Moth, with enclosed accommodation, and the Moth Minor, a low-wing monoplane constructed of wood. One of de Havilland's trademarks was that the name of the aircraft type was painted on using a particularly elegant Roman typeface, all in capital letters. When there was a strike at the plant, the artisans who painted the name on the planes used the same typeface to make the workers' protest signs.

The DH.84 Dragon was the first aeroplane purchased by Aer Lingus in 1936; they later operated the DH.86B Dragon Express and the DH.89 Dragon Rapide. De Havilland continued to produce high-performance aircraft including the twin piston-engined DH.88 Comet racers, one of which became famous as the winner of the MacRobertson Air Race from England to Australia in 1934.

=== Second World War ===
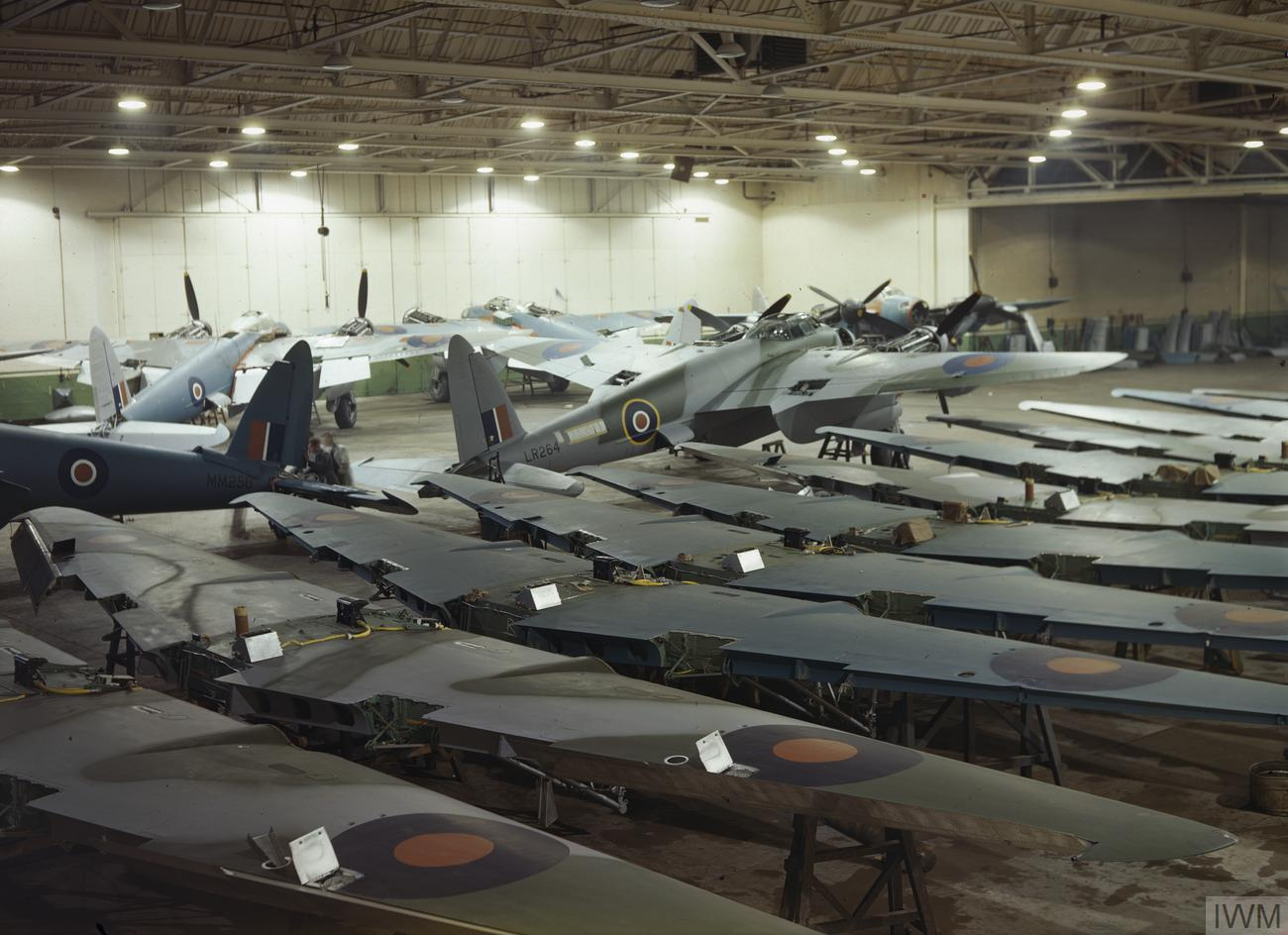
Building Mosquito aircraft at the de Havilland factory in Hatfield, 1943

The high-performance designs and wooden construction methods culminated in the Mosquito, constructed primarily of wood, which avoided use of strategic materials such as aluminium during the Second World War. The company followed this with the even higher-performing Hornet fighter, which was one of the pioneers of the use of metal-wood and metal-metal bonding techniques.

In 1937 de Havilland set up a factory at what is now known as De Havilland Way in Lostock to produce variable pitch propellers for the RAF. The site was of strategic importance and became a German Luftwaffe target. On 3 July 1942 two Ju 88 bombers attempted a low-altitude bombing raid, using the Rivington reservoir chain to navigate but the mission went off course.

=== After the war ===
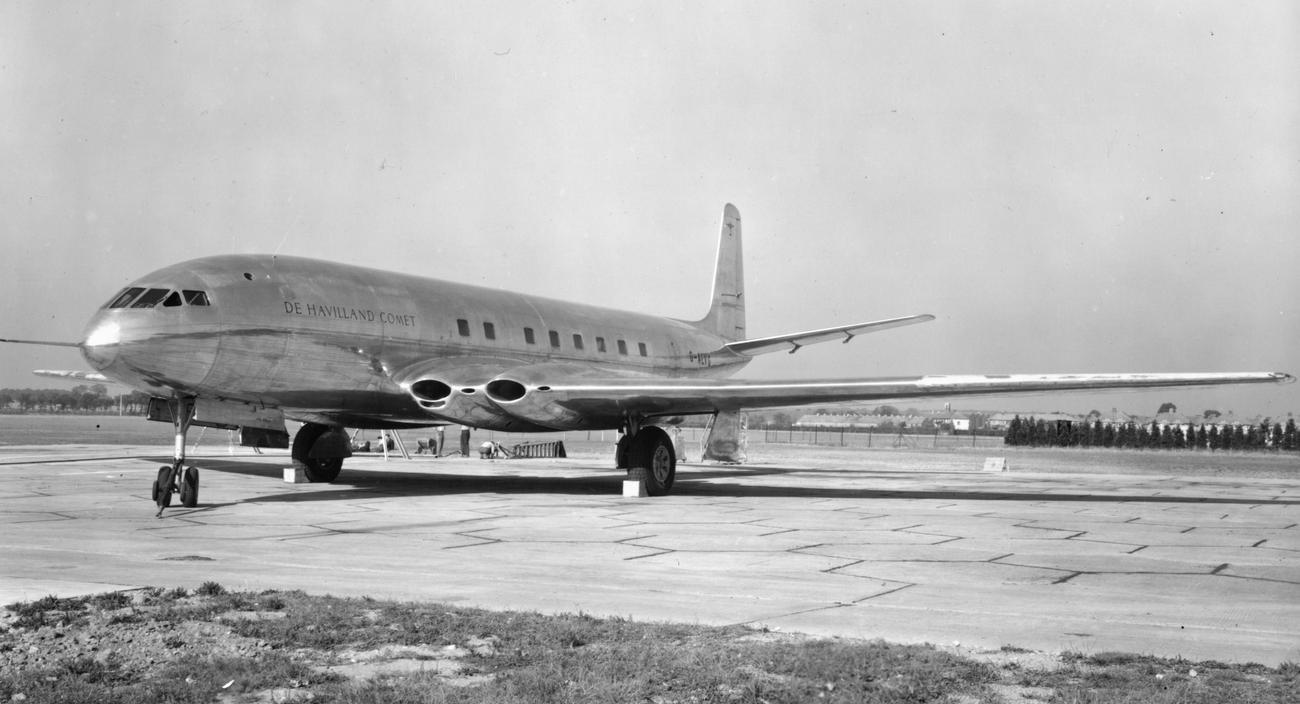
The first de Havilland DH.106 Comet prototype at Hatfield in 1949, a symbol of the new technological age.

After the Second World War de Havilland continued with advanced designs in both the military and civil fields, but several public disasters doomed the company as an independent entity. The experimental tailless jet-powered de Havilland DH.108 Swallow crashed in the Thames Estuary, killing Geoffrey de Havilland Jr., son of the company's founder. A large additional aircraft factory was acquired in 1948 at Hawarden Airport at Broughton near Chester, where production supplemented the Hatfield output. The de Havilland Comet was put into service in 1952 as the eagerly anticipated first commercial jet airliner, twice as fast as previous alternatives and a source of British national pride. Operated by British Overseas Airways Corporation, on 2 May 1952 the flight registered G-ALYP took off with fare-paying passengers and inaugurated scheduled service from London to Johannesburg. Powered by four de Havilland Ghost jet engines, the Comet could reach speeds of 500 miles per hour (halving journey times around the world), and fly at an altitude of 40,000 feet, a performance previously the preserve of military jet fighters. Twenty months after the launch, there were 17 Comets in service. The Comet suffered three high-profile crashes in two years. Two of these were found to be caused by structural failure resulting from metal fatigue in the airframe, a phenomenon not fully understood at the time; the other was due to overstressing of the airframe during flight through severe weather. Sir Arnold Hall led the RAE research team that made the discovery that the rivets punched into the metal caused a minute fatigue crack.

Because of the structural problems of the Comet, in 1954 all remaining examples were withdrawn from service, with de Havilland launching a major effort to build a new version that would be both larger and stronger. As a result, the Comet was extensively redesigned, with oval windows, structural reinforcements and other changes. Rival manufacturers meanwhile heeded the lessons learned from the Comet while developing their own aircraft. The Comet 4 enabled the de Havilland airliner to return to the skies in 1958. By then the United States had its Boeing 707 jet and the Douglas DC-8, both of which were faster and more economical to operate. Orders for the Comet dried up.

Hawker Siddeley bought de Havilland in 1960 but kept it as a separate company until 1963. In that year it became the de Havilland Division of Hawker Siddeley Aviation and all types in production or development changed their designations from "DH" to "HS". De Havilland's final designs became the Hawker Siddeley Trident (originally the DH.121) and the innovative Hawker Siddeley HS.125, originally the DH.125.

The DH.121 design was modified to be smaller to fit the needs of one airline—British European Airways. Other airlines found it unattractive and turned to a rival tri-jet, the Boeing 727 which was much the same size as the initial DH.121 design. De Havilland, as Hawker Siddeley, built only 117 Tridents, while Boeing went on to sell over 1,800 727s.

De Havilland also entered the field of long-range missiles, developing the liquid-fuelled Blue Streak. It did not enter military service, but became the first stage of Europa, a launch vehicle for use in space flight. In flight tests, the Blue Streak performed well but the upper stages, built in France and Germany, repeatedly failed. In 1973, the Europa programme was cancelled, with Blue Streak dying as well. The last of them wound up in the hands of a farmer who used its fuel tanks to house his chickens.

== Products ==
=== Aircraft ===
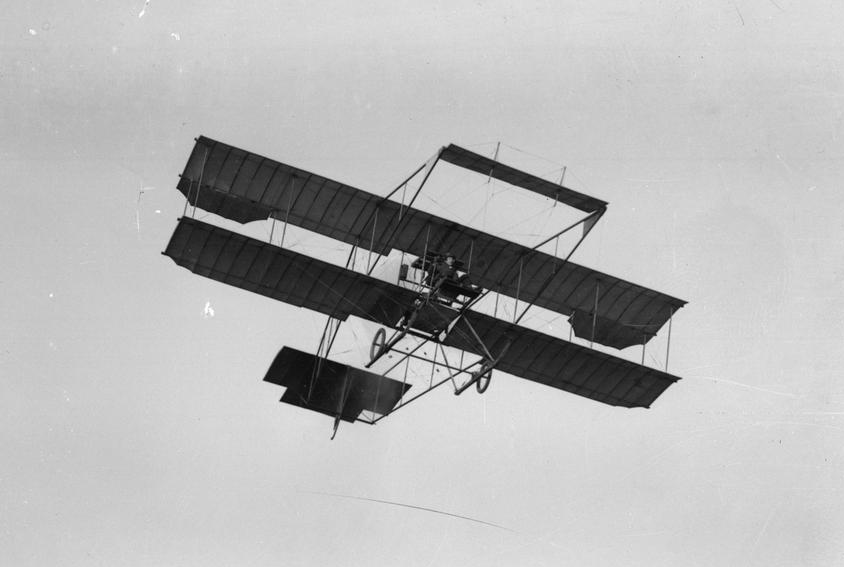
The de Havilland Biplane No. 2 or F.E.1 in flight, circa 1911

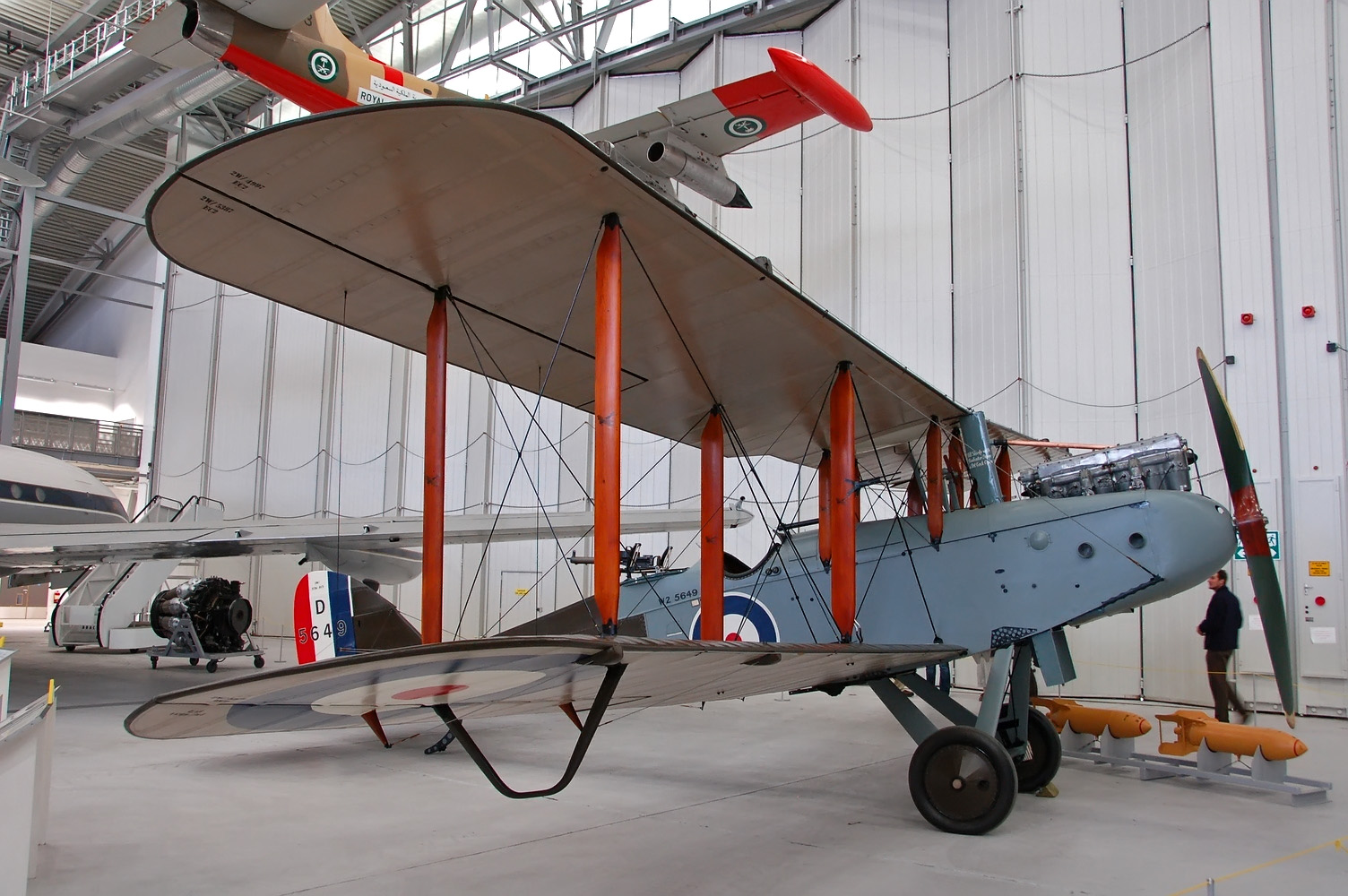
A de Havilland Airco DH.9 on display at the Imperial War Museum Duxford in 2008

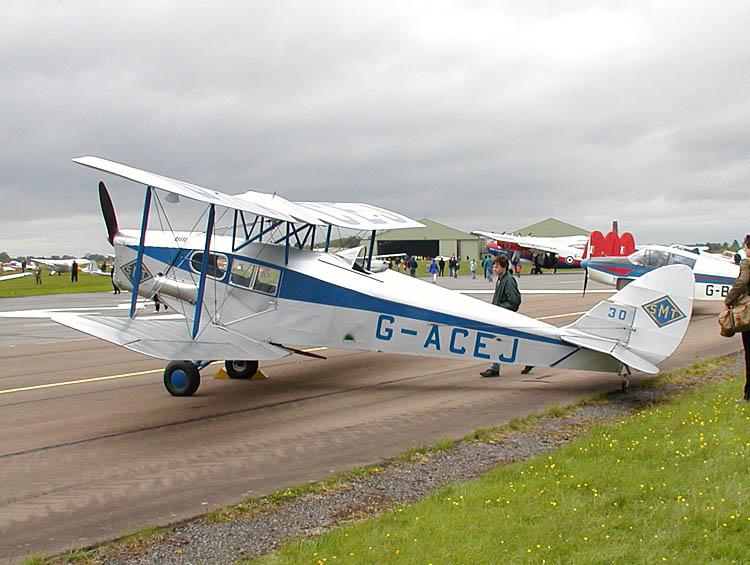
A de Havilland DH.83 Fox Moth at Kemble Airport in 2003

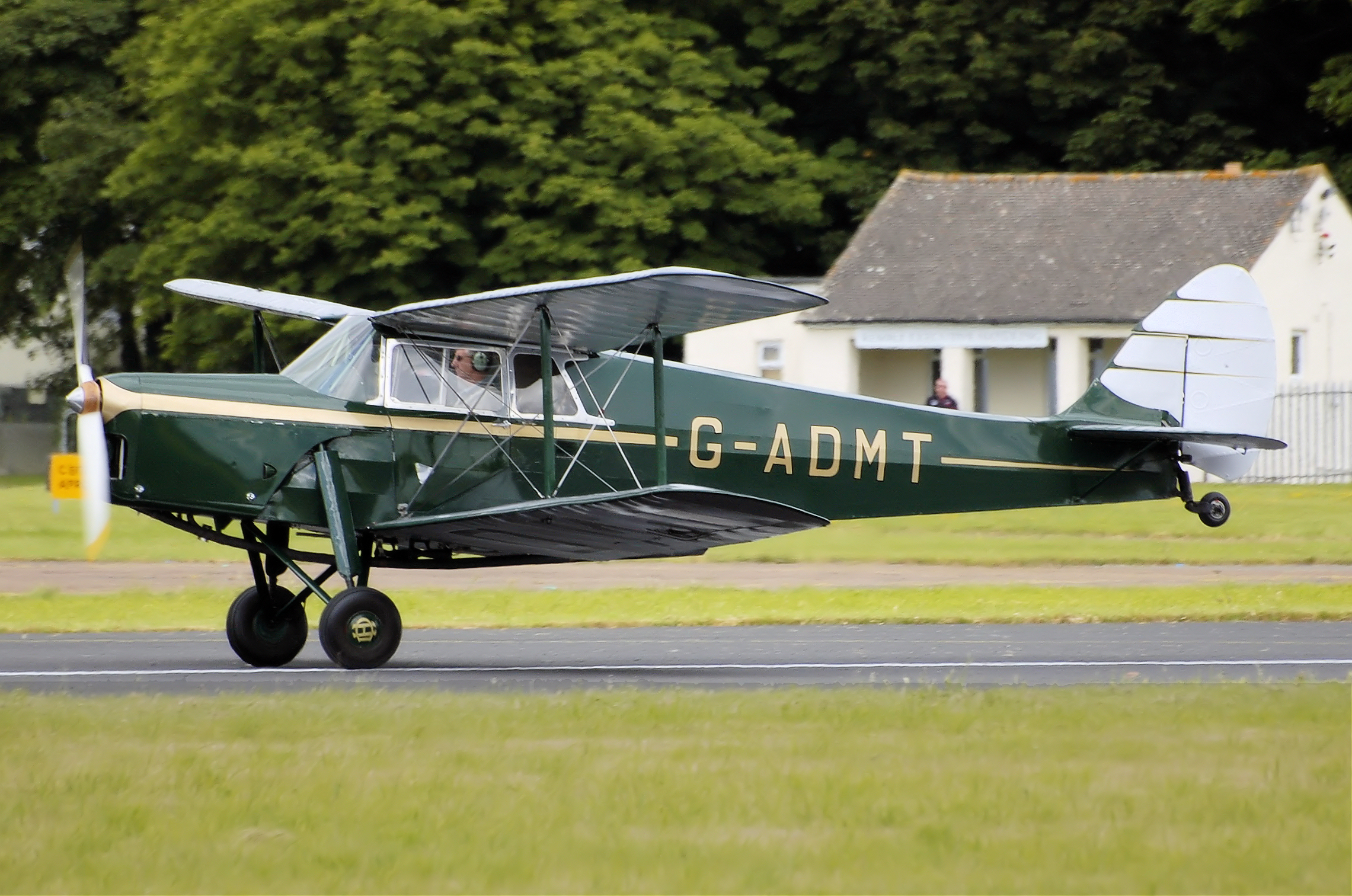
1936 de Havilland DH.87B Hornet Moth taking off at Kemble Air Day, Wiltshire, in 2008

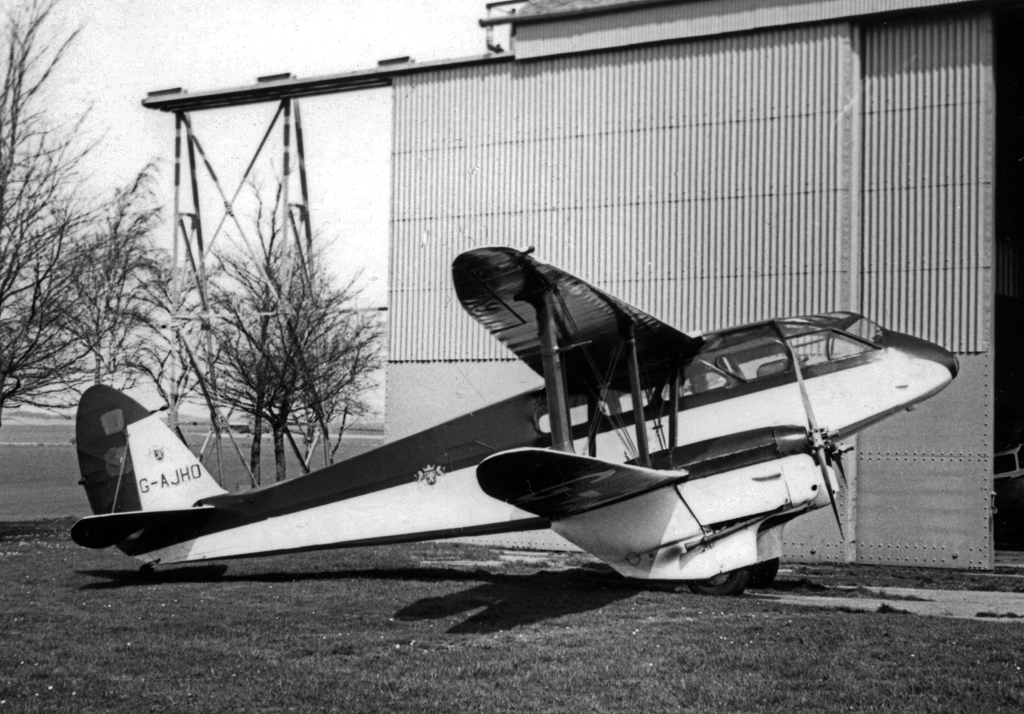
A DH.89 Dragon Rapide of the Army Parachute Association at RAF Netheravon in 1968

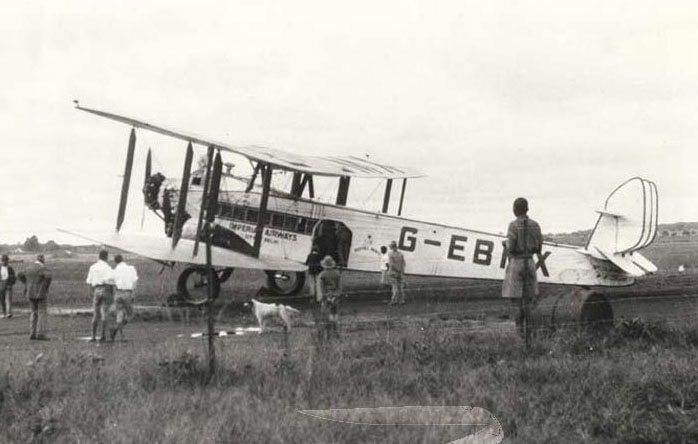
De Havilland Hercules-66 Imperial Airways

- Designed by Geoffrey de Havilland
  - de Havilland Biplane No. 1
  - Royal Aircraft Factory F.E.1 (also known as "de Havilland Biplane No. 2")
- Designed by de Havilland at Airco
  - Airco DH.1 2 seat pusher scout
  - Airco DH.2 pusher scout
  - Airco DH.3 twin engine bomber
  - Airco DH.4 single engine bomber
  - Airco DH.4A transport
  - Airco DH.5 scout
  - Airco DH.6 trainer
  - Airco DH.9 single engine bomber
  - Airco DH.9A – Westland development of the DH.9 with Liberty engine
  - Airco DH.9C – conversion of DH.9 to passenger transport
  - Airco DH.9J – re-engined DH.9 with radial engine
  - Airco DH.10 Amiens twin engine bomber
  - Airco DH.11 Oxford long range twin engine day bomber
  - DH.12 – unbuilt proposed derivative of DH.11
- de Havilland
  - DH.14 Okapi single engine bomber
  - DH.15 Gazelle experimental flying test bed
  - Airco DH.16 4 passenger airliner similar to DH.9C
  - DH.18 8 passenger airliner
- de Havilland company
  - DH.27 Derby single engine long range day bomber
  - DH.34
  - DH.37
  - DH.42 Dormouse
  - DH.42A & B Dingo
  - DH.48 Special re-engined DH.9
  - DH.50
  - DH.51
  - DH.53 Humming Bird
  - DH.54 Highclere
  - DH.56 Hyena
  - DH.60 Moth, Cirrus Moth, Genet Moth, Gypsy Moth
  - DH.60G III Moth Major
  - DH.61 Giant Moth
  - DH.65 Hound
  - DH.66 Hercules 3-engined biplane airliner
  - DH.67
  - DH.72 Canberra
  - DH.82 Tiger Moth biplane trainer
  - DH.83 Fox Moth
  - DH.84 Dragon
  - DH.86 Express
  - DH.87 Hornet Moth
  - DH.89 Dragon Rapide
  - DH.90 Dragonfly
  - DH.92 Dolphin
- Glider
  - DH.52

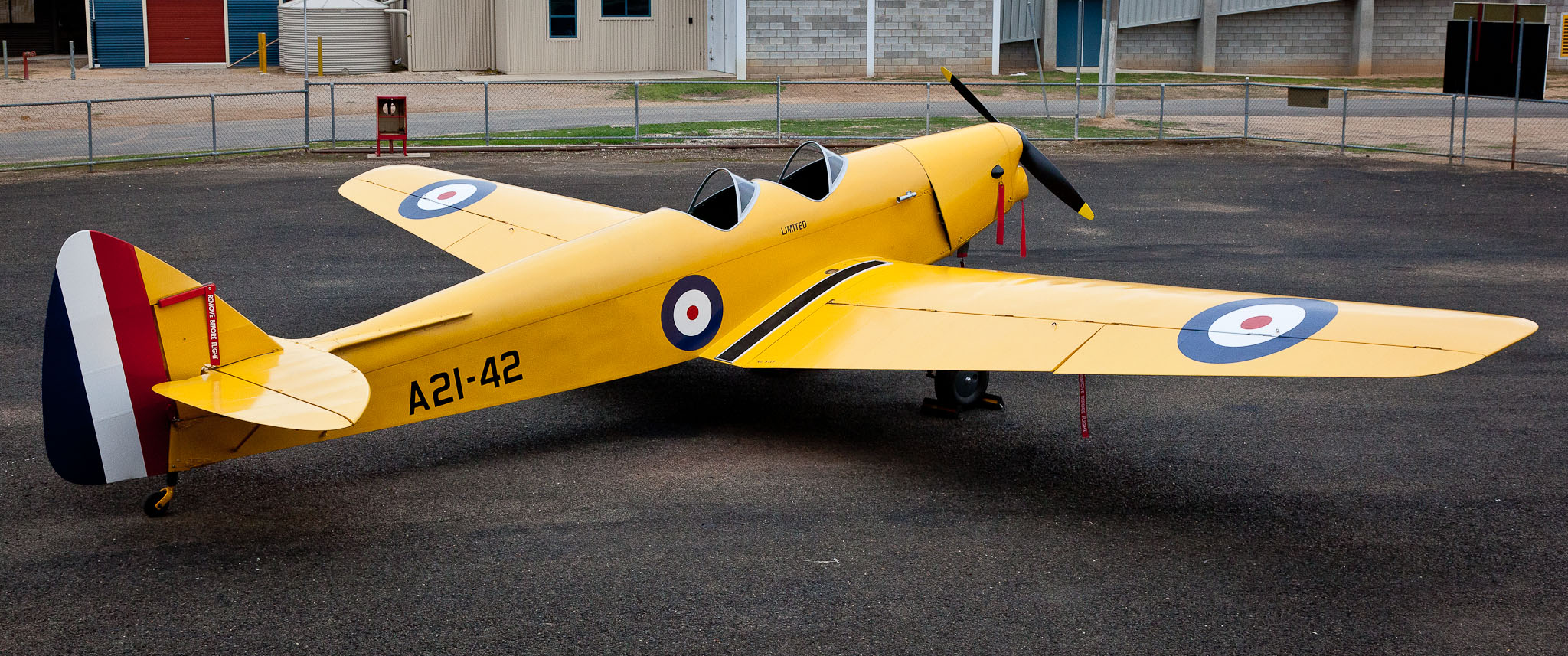
ex RAAF DH.94 Moth Minor at Benalla Aviation Museum in June 2012

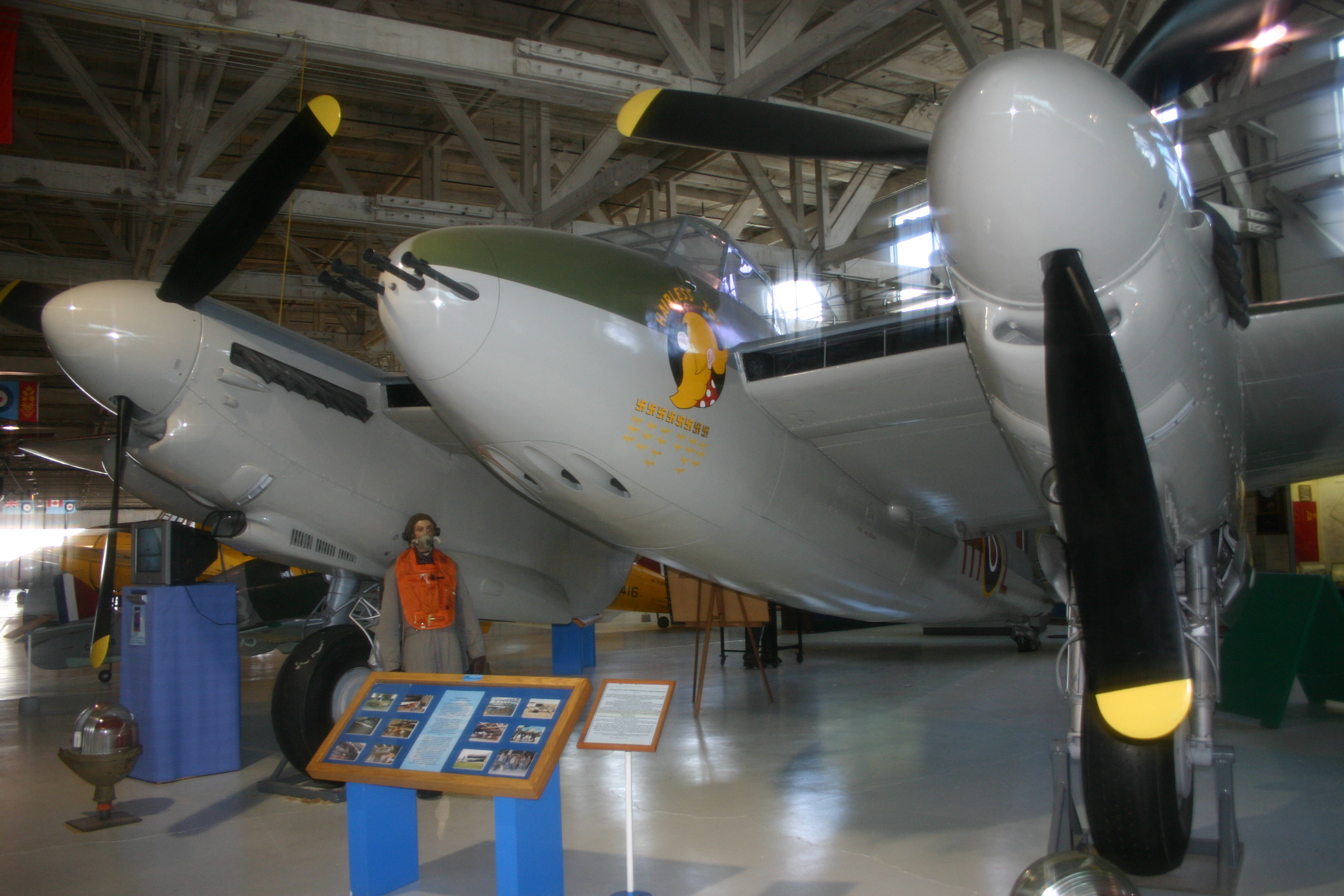
de Havilland Mosquito B 35 (reconfigured to a FB Mk.VI, on display at the Alberta Aviation Museum)

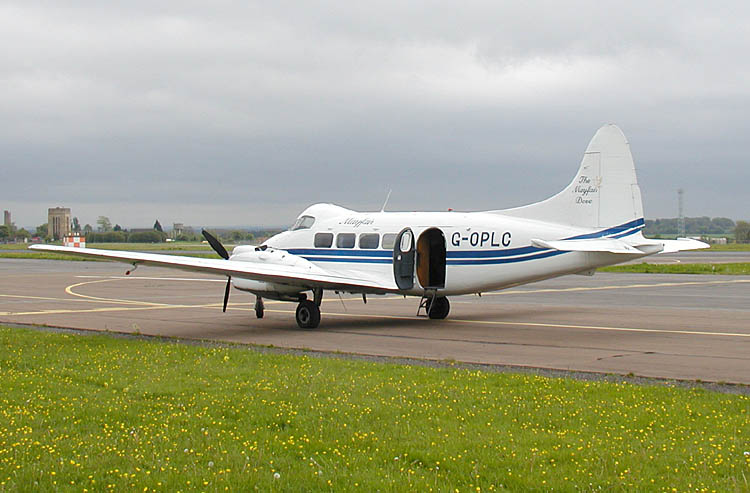
A de Havilland DH.104 Dove at Kemble in 2003

- Piston-engined monoplanes
  - DH.29 Doncaster 10 passenger airliner
  - DH.53 Humming Bird ultralight monoplane
  - DH.71 Tiger Moth racer
  - DH.75 Hawk Moth
  - DH.77 lightweight fighter
  - DH.80 Puss Moth
  - DH.81 Swallow Moth
  - DH.85 Leopard Moth
  - DH.88 Comet racer
  - DH.91 Albatross 4-engined airliner
  - DH.93 Don
  - DH.94 Moth Minor monoplane trainer
  - DH.95 Flamingo twin-engined airliner
  - DH.98 Mosquito & Sea Mosquito A highly successful wooden fighter-bomber of WWII
  - DH.103 Hornet & Sea Hornet twin-engined fighter
  - DH.104 Dove & Devon twin-engined airliner
  - DH.114 Heron 4-engined airliner
- de Havilland Technical School designs
  - de Havilland T.K.1
  - de Havilland T.K.2
  - de Havilland T.K.4
  - de Havilland T.K.5

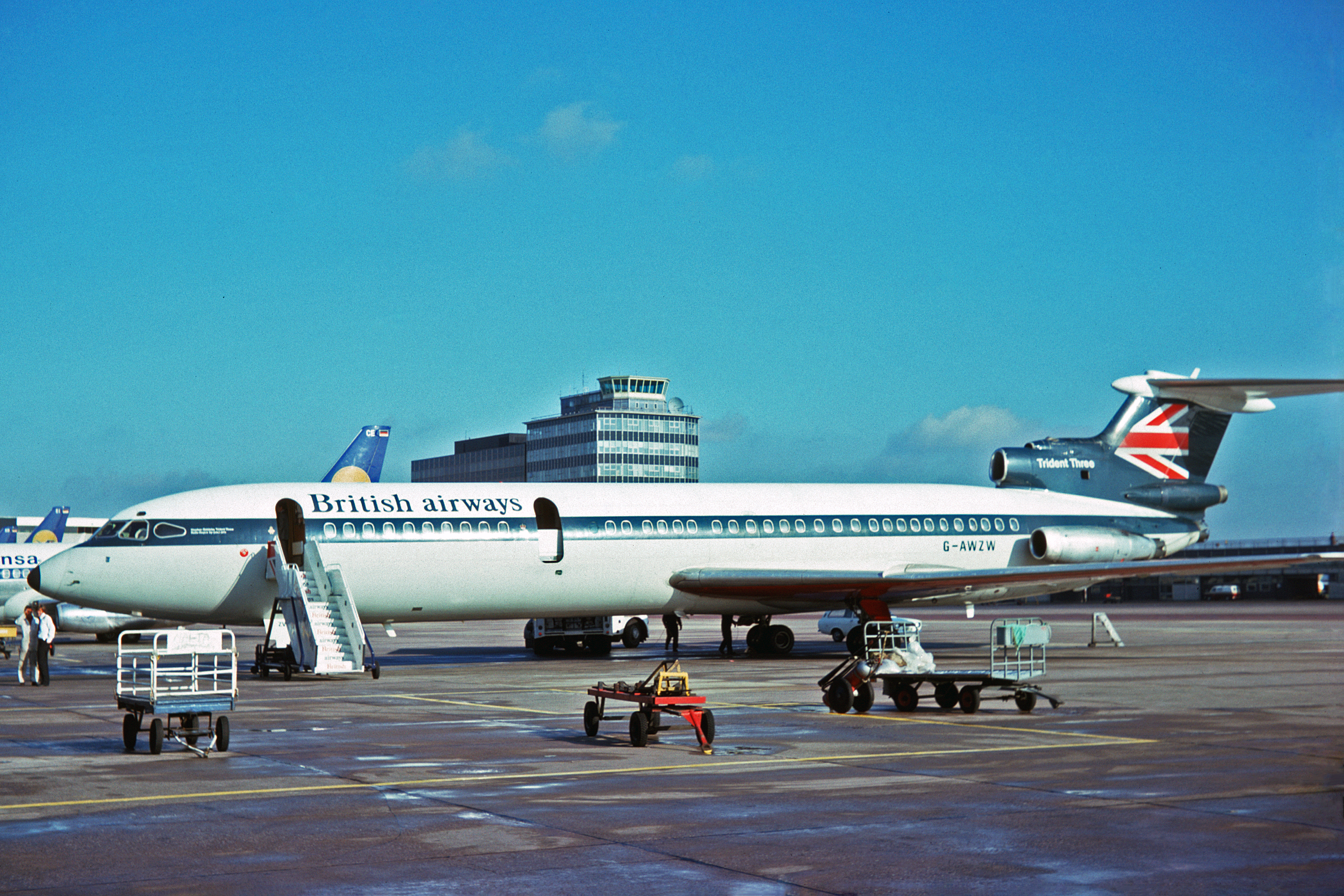
The de Havilland-designed HS.121 Trident 3 of British Airways at Manchester Airport in 1975

- Civil and military jet transports
  - DH.106 Comet
  - DH.121 Trident later the HS.121 Trident
  - DH.125 later the HS.125
  - DH.146 later the BAe.146

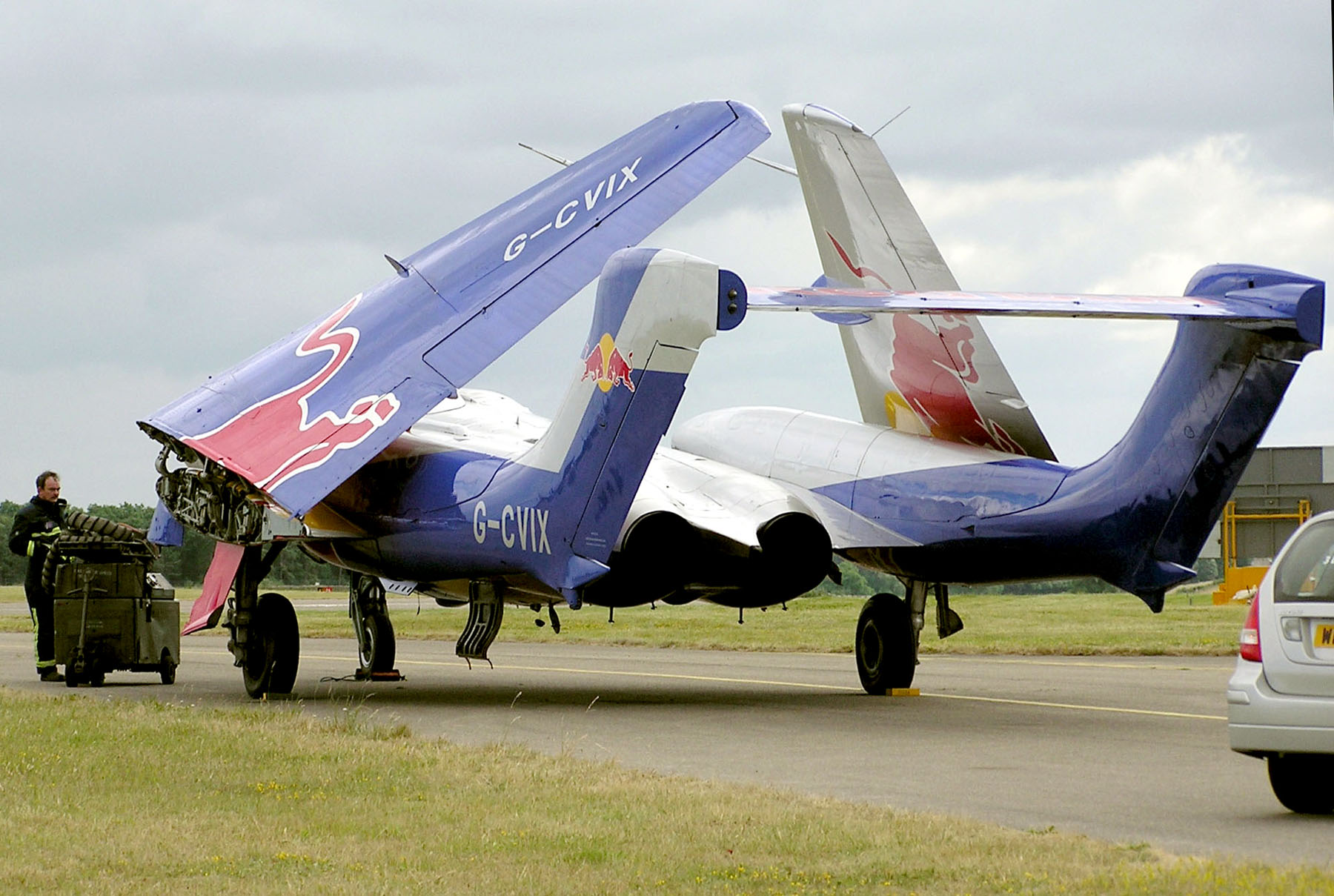
de Havilland DH.110 Sea Vixen (G-CVIX) at an air show at Kemble in 2005

- Military jets
  - DH.100 Vampire & Sea Vampire (1945)
  - DH.110 Sea Vixen (1951)
  - DH.112 Venom (1952)
  - DH.112 Sea Venom
  - DH.113 & DH.115 Vampire two seaters
- Experimental aircraft
  - DH.108 Swallow (1946)
- Autogyro
  - Cierva C.24

=== Engines ===
- Gipsy series of 4-, 6- and 12-cylinder piston engines
- Ghost turbojet
- Goblin turbojet
- Gyron Junior turbojet
- Gnome turboshaft
- Sprite rocket

=== Weapon systems ===
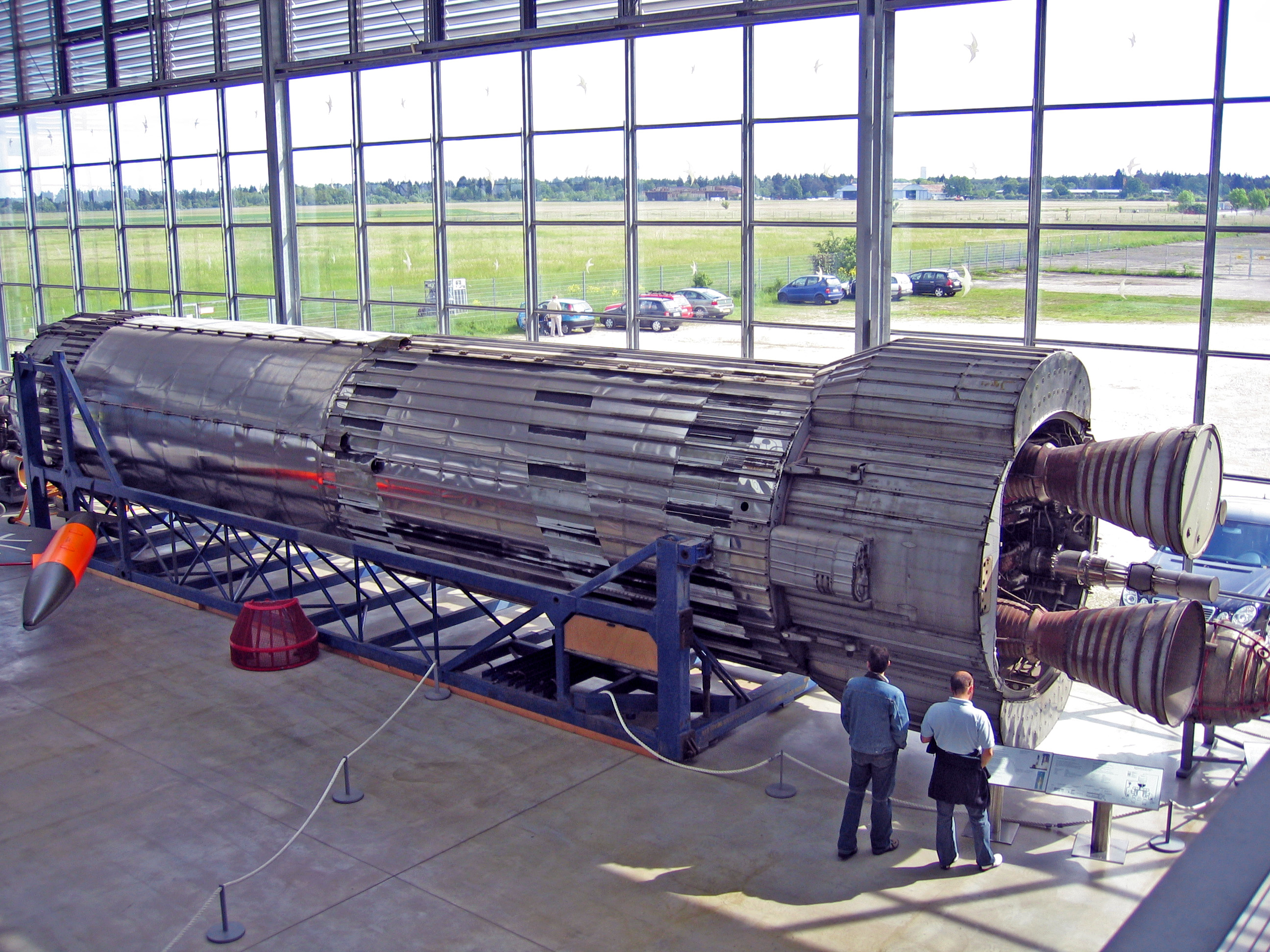
A Blue Streak missile at the Deutsches Museum at Oberschleissheim, Munich

- Missiles
  - Firestreak air-to-air missile
  - Bluestreak ballistic missile
- Spacecraft
  - Blue Streak Satellite Launch Vehicle

== Subsidiaries ==
=== de Havilland Canada ===
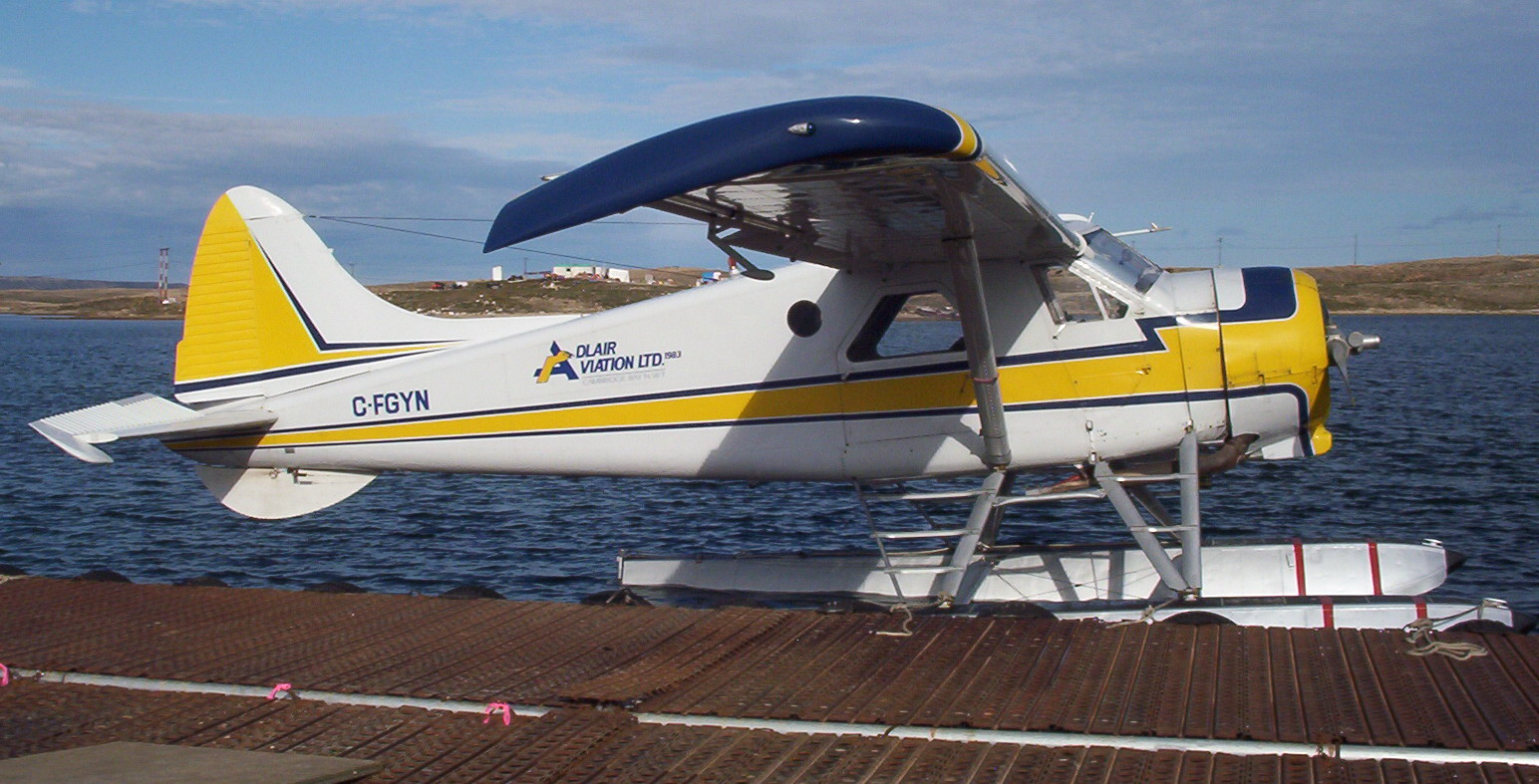
C-FGYN Adlair Aviation Ltd. de Havilland Canada DHC-2 Beaver Mk I on floats

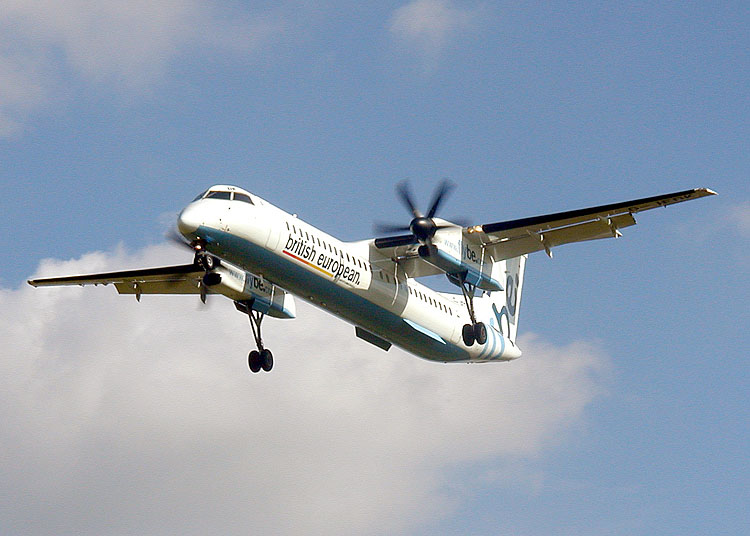
Bombardier (de Havilland Canada) Dash 8 of Flybe

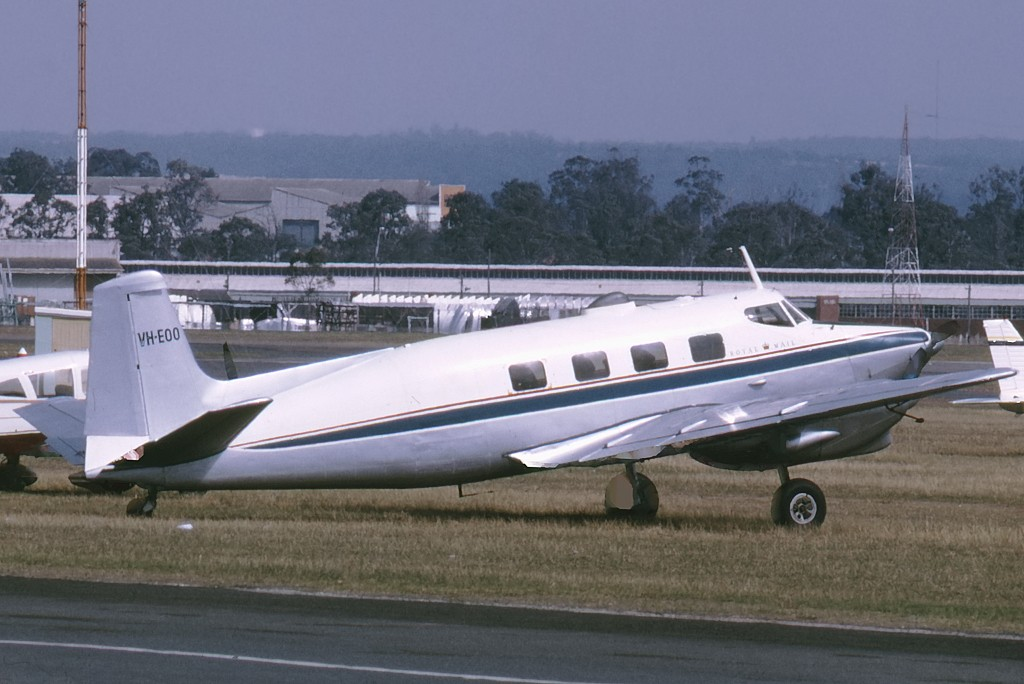
De Havilland Australia DHA-3 Drover 3B at Sydney (Bankstown) in 1970, where it was originally built

de Havilland Aircraft of Canada Ltd. was formed in 1928 to build de Havilland aircraft for the Canadian market, in some cases adapted to suit to the harsh Canadian environment. When World War II arrived, this set-up was ready made to expand production to augment British aircraft factories, without any possible threat from enemy bombers. After the war de Havilland Canada developed its own range of designs, identified as DHC-1 through to DHC-8, which were also often tailor-made for Canadian use, but as rugged and/or STOL designs, also found markets in other environments. DHC became a Canadian Crown Corporation during the war, was sold to Boeing in December 1985, then on to Bombardier Aerospace in 1992.

In November 2018, Longview Aviation Capital Corp. acquired the Dash 8 programme and the de Havilland Canada brand from Bombardier, adding them to the rights and type certificates for all of the out-of-production aircraft (DHC-1 through DHC-7) already sold to its subsidiary Viking Air in 2005. The deal, which closed on 3 June 2019 following regulatory approval, brought the entire de Havilland Canada product line under the same banner for the first time in decades, under a new holding company bearing a name almost identical to the original, De Havilland Aircraft of Canada Limited.

=== de Havilland Australia ===
The first overseas subsidiary was set up in Australia in March 1927 as de Havilland Aircraft Pty. Ltd. The company moved from Melbourne to Sydney during 1930 where it acted as an agency for the parent company, with assembly, repair and spares facilities for the company's popular sporting and airliner types. Aircraft design and full manufacture by de Havilland Australia (DHA) did not take place until the Second World War, when the company began production of the DH.82 Tiger Moth primary trainer at Bankstown, NSW.

During the Second World War, DHA designed a small troop-carrying glider to be used if Australia was invaded by Japan. The DH-G1 emerged in mid-1942 and used the DH.84 Dragon forward fuselage, 87 of which were in production at the same factory as navigational trainers. The two built served as prototypes for the definitive DH-G2 produced the following year but the need had passed by this time and only six DH-G2s were built. The company also began to manufacture the Mosquito, with deliveries to the RAAF being first made in 1944. A total of 212 Mosquitos were built at Bankstown between 1943 and 1948. Some of these aircraft continued in RAAF service until 1953.

Licensed production of the de Havilland Vampire began in 1948, with the first of 190 built flying in 1949.

Another DHA design, the de Havilland Australia DHA-3 Drover, was manufactured between 1948 and 1953. Only 20 were produced, mostly for the Royal Flying Doctor Service (RFDS), Trans Australia Airlines and Qantas. The DHA-3 Drover was a three-engined light transport derived from the DH.104 Dove, capable of carrying six to eight passengers. It was designed as a replacement for the DH.84 Dragon, which was common in Australia due to its wartime production by DHA. The engine chosen for the new design was the de Havilland Gipsy Major Mk-10 4s. Several Drovers were later re-engined with more powerful Lycoming O-360 horizontally-opposed engines to improve performance.

In 1959 a boat building division known as de Havilland Marine was established at the Bankstown factory.

The de Havilland Australia concern was purchased by Boeing Australia and was renamed Hawker de Havilland Aerospace. On 6 February 2009, Boeing announced that Hawker de Havilland Aerospace had changed its name to Boeing Aerostructures Australia.

- DH-G1
- DHA-G2
- DHA-3 Drover

=== de Havilland New Zealand ===
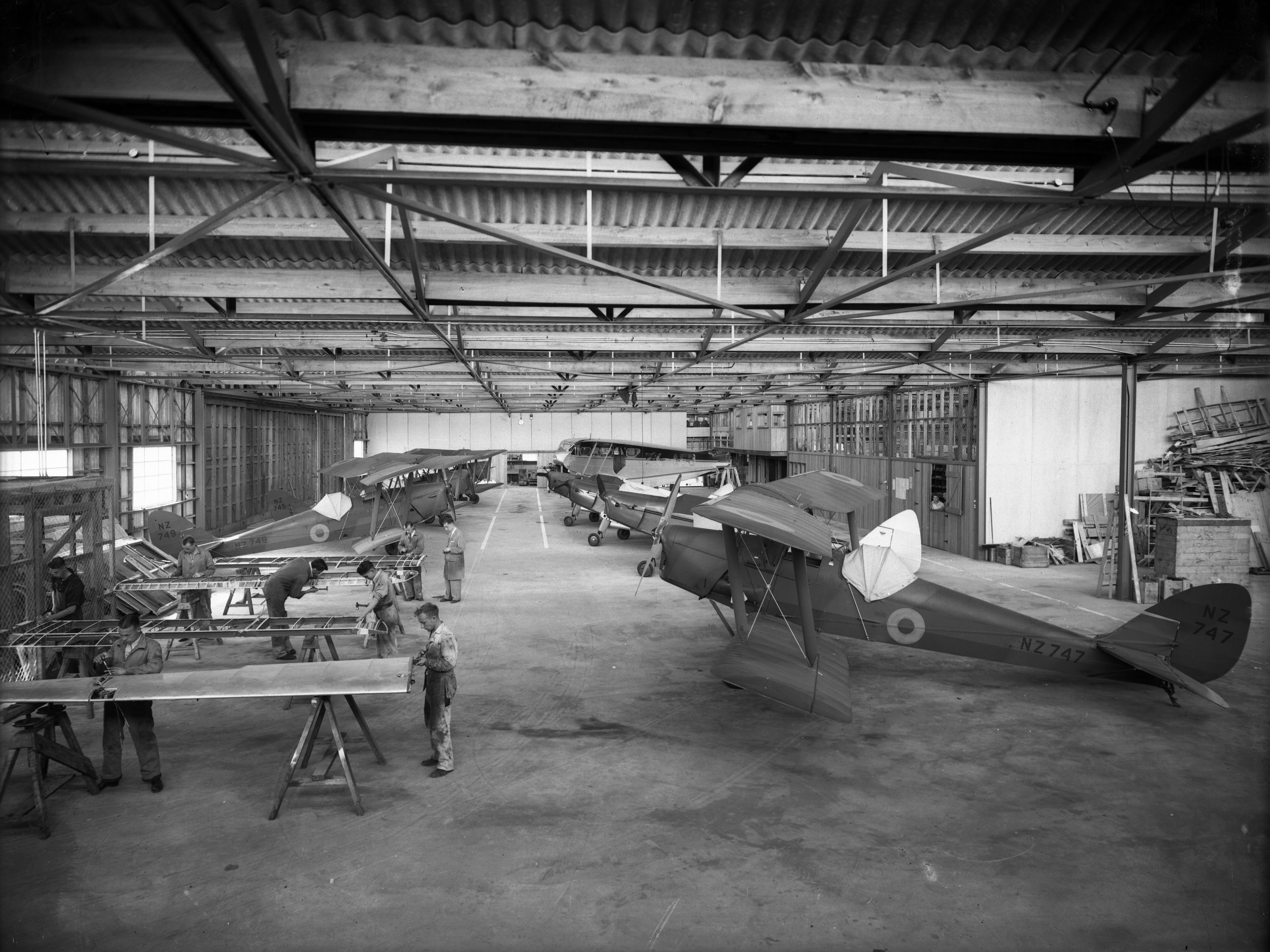
The interior of de Havilland New Zealand's aircraft factory at Rongotai, Wellington, in 1939 or 1940

To meet the demand for Tiger Moth trainers for the Royal New Zealand Air Force and potentially for RAF training to be conducted in New Zealand, the de Havilland (New Zealand) Company Limited was established in March 1939, and work commenced on New Zealand's first aircraft factory at Rongotai. After World War II, the company undertook maintenance and refurbishment work until taken over by Hawker Siddeley International NZ Ltd in 1964. The site of the factory is now part of Wellington International Airport.

=== de Havilland Engines ===
As well as a prolific aircraft builder, de Havilland was also a significant producer of aero engines. This went against usual practice: usually engines are designed and produced by a dedicated company though in the UK the Bristol Aeroplane Company had a substantial engine business and Armstrong Whitworth Aircraft was part of the same business as Armstrong Siddeley The successful "Gipsy" and the later developments such as the Gipsy Major were successful and popular power units, being used in nearly all of de Havilland's light designs and several aircraft from other manufacturers. Gipsy engines were relatively unusual by the 1930s/40s because they were in-line engines, at a time when radial or opposed-action engine layouts were more popular. The de Havilland company was also a competitor to Rolls-Royce and Metrovick in the early years of jet engine development. Employing the services of Frank Halford then buying out his company they produced the de Havilland Goblin and de Havilland Ghost engines for first their jet fighters then the Comet.

=== de Havilland Propellers ===
A company set up in 1935 for the manufacture of Hamilton Standard propellers under licence, and which later produced guided and other missiles such as the Firestreak and Blue Streak.

=== Key technical staff ===
- R. E. Bishop, aircraft designer
- Richard Clarkson, aircraft designer
- Tony Fairbrother, flight engineer
- A. E. Hagg, aircraft designer
- Frank Halford, engine designer

=== Test pilots ===
- Hubert Broad
- John Cunningham (RAF officer)
- Geoffrey de Havilland Jr.
- John de Havilland
- Pat Fillingham
- Bert Hinkler
- Campbell MacKenzie-Richards

== Legacy ==
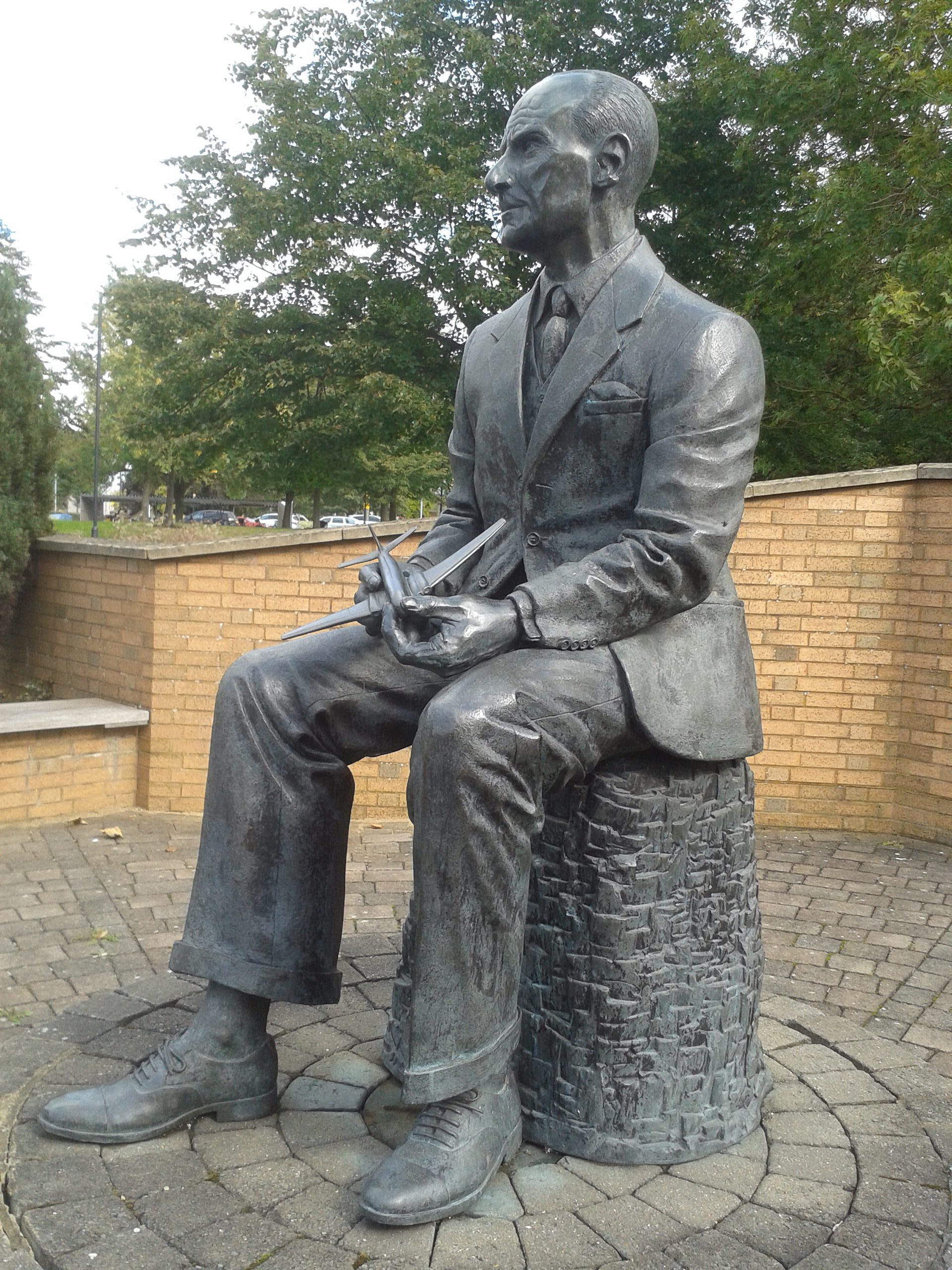
Statue of Geoffrey de Havilland, University of Hertfordshire, Hatfield

The de Havilland company donated a site to Hertfordshire County Council for educational use: the site was then developed as Hatfield Technical College, which is now the College Lane Campus of the University of Hertfordshire. De Havilland was purchased by Hawker Siddeley in 1960 and merged into British Aerospace in 1978. The BAE site then closed in 1993, and the University of Hertfordshire purchased part of the site for the de Havilland Campus. Hatfield's aerospace history is recorded today in the names of local streets, such as Comet Way, Dragon Road and DeHavilland Close.

In September 2003 part of the former British aerospace site became the de Havilland campus of the University of Hertfordshire.

== See also ==
- de Havilland Aircraft Museum
- Aerospace industry in the United Kingdom
