= Cecil Bebb =

British commercial pilot and airline executive

Cecil William Henry Bebb
- Cecil Bebb in 1983
- Born: Cecil William Henry Bebb; 27 September 1905
- Died: 29 March 2002
- Military career
- Allegiance: United Kingdom
- Rank: Captain
- Nickname: Cecil
- Awards: Grand Cross of the Imperial Order of the Yoke and Arrows

Captain Cecil William Henry Bebb (27 September 1905 – 29 March 2002) was a British commercial pilot and later airline executive, notable for flying General Francisco Franco from the Canary Islands to Spanish Morocco in 1936, a journey which was to mark the beginning of the Spanish Civil War.

== Early life ==
Bebb was the son of Robert Eustace Albert and Mary Ann Bebb, of Hornsey. His father was a dentist, and he was baptized as Cecil William Henry into the Church of England on 12 November 1905, when his date of birth was noted as 27 September 1905. His birth was registered as Cecil William H. Bebb in October 1905. Despite this, some sources state his first name as Charles.

By 11 November 1932, when Bebb was aged 26, he had qualified as a pilot. On that date he sailed from England on the RMS Edinburgh Castle, destination Cape Town, and was logged as a pilot, of Heston.

== Events of July 1936 ==
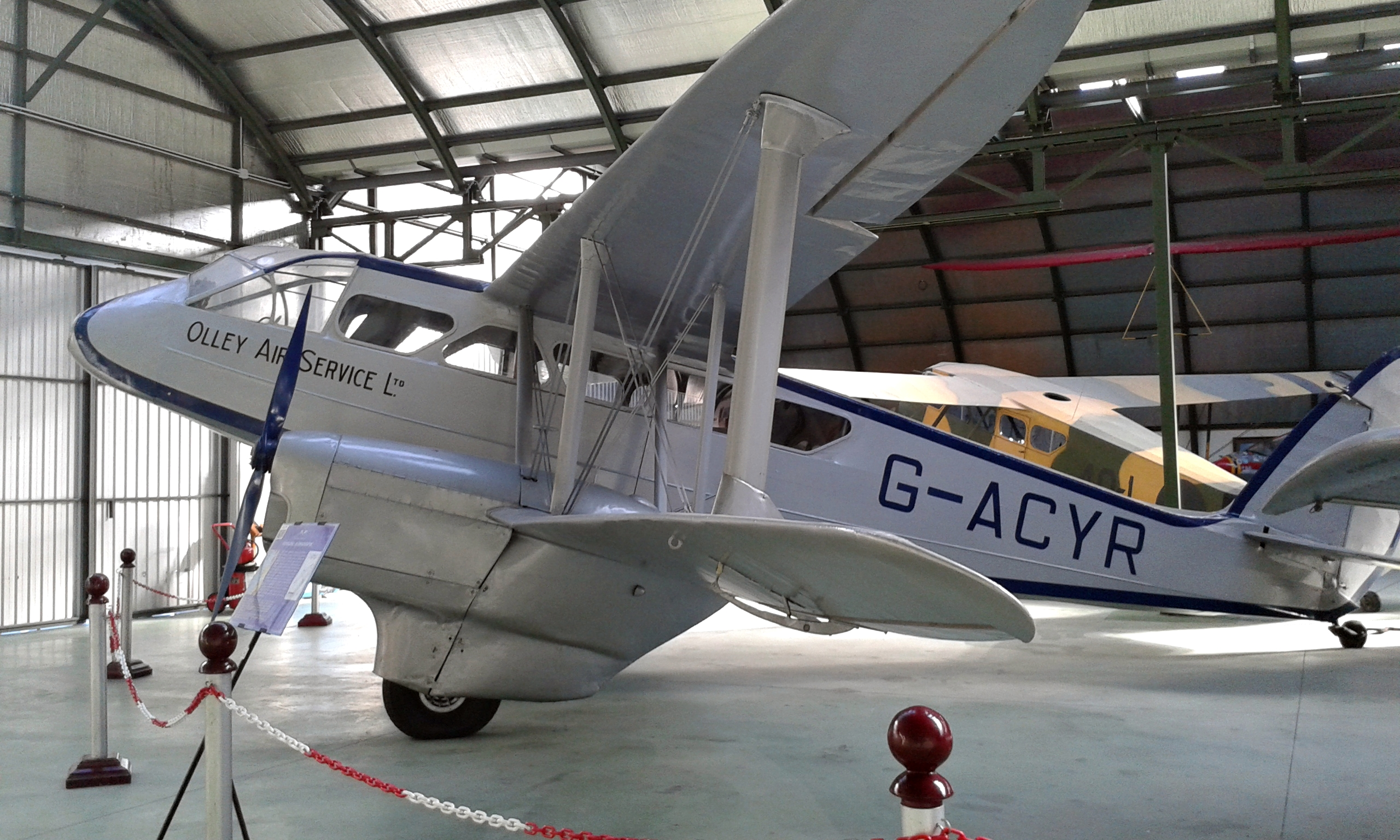
De Havilland Dragon Rapide, G-ACYR, the aircraft flown by Bebb in 1936; photographed in 2014

At 07:15 on the morning of 11 July 1936, Captain Bebb took off from Croydon Airport, London, in a Dragon Rapide aircraft, with a navigator, his friend Major Hugh Pollard, and two female companions.

The flight log records that the aircraft was bound for the Canary Islands. The purpose of Bebb's flight was to collect General Franco from the Canaries and fly him to Tetuán in the Spanish protectorate in Morocco, where the Spanish African Army was garrisoned.

Franco was recognized by the government in Madrid as a danger to the Second Spanish Republic and had been sent to the Canaries in order to keep him away from political intrigue. Had a Spanish plane flown to the islands, the authorities would probably have been alerted, but the British aircraft attracted little or no attention. Bebb and Franco arrived in Tetuán on 19 July and the general assumed command of the army, which had rebelled two days earlier and secured most of Spanish Morocco.

It is possible that British security services may have been complicit in Bebb's flight. Certainly his companion Pollard had previously been an intelligence agent. The flight itself was planned over lunch at Simpson's in the Strand, where Douglas Francis Jerrold, the conservative Roman Catholic editor of the English Review, met with the journalist Luis Bolín, London correspondent of the ABC Newspaper and later Franco's senior press advisor. Jerrold then persuaded Pollard to join the enterprise, who flew with Bebb as pilot, and daughter Diana Pollard and her friend as passengers to pose as tourists.

Bebb and Pollard were decorated by Franco in recognition of their services. In 1939, as the Spanish Civil War ended, both were awarded the Grand Cross of the Imperial Order of the Yoke and Arrows.

== Later career ==
During the Second World War, Bebb became chief test pilot at Cunliffe-Owen Aircraft, a British aircraft manufacturer, primarily a repair and overhaul shop, whose work included the Supermarine Seafire. He was also a test pilot at A W Hawkesley Limited (a Hawker Siddeley subsidiary based at Brockworth, Gloucestershire) In 1946, after the war, he returned to Olley Air Service Ltd. He continued his work in commercial aviation into the 1960s. As an airline executive, he achieved the position of Operations Manager at British United Airways.

In 1970, Franco conferred on Bebb the Order of Civil Merit and the White Cross for Military Merit, in a ceremony in Madrid.

In a 1983 interview for the Granada television documentary The Spanish Civil War, Bebb stated that he had been approached by "a gentleman from Spain, who asked me if I was prepared to go to the Canary islands to get a Rif leader to start an insurrection in Spanish Morocco. I thought 'what a delightful idea, what a great adventure'".

Bebb died on 29 Match 2002, when his death was registered at Sutton, Surrey.

The aircraft that carried Franco to Tetuán in Morocco, a dH89 Dragon Rapide (G-ACYR), was presented to Franco as a gift, after the end of the Second World War, and is now displayed in the Museo del Aire near Madrid.
