= Luis Bolín =

Spanish lawyer, journalist and tour-operating expert

Luis Antonio Bolín Bidwell (1897 Málaga – 3 September 1969) was a Spanish lawyer, journalist and tour-operating expert. That led to his appointment as Head of the National Union of Catering and Allied Attorney in Parliament during the first four legislatures of Francoist Spain. In his memoirs, he simply uses the English spelling, Bolin.

== Early life ==
Bolín was born into a well-to-do family of wine merchants in Málaga, Spain, in 1897. His mother was English. He studied at the Universities of Granada and Madrid, and later in London.

== Career ==
During World War I, Bolín worked in France with the British Army as a war correspondent. In 1920, he was press attaché at the Spanish Embassy in London. He also became a correspondent for the conservative and monarchist Spanish newspaper ABC, and in 1921, he became a member of the information section of the League of Nations. He was an ardent monarchist and opposed the coming of the Spanish Republic in 1931 after the abdication of Alfonso XIII. He was even more alarmed by what he perceived as the revolutionary tendencies that started after the electoral success of the Popular Front in early 1936 and believed that they could not be controlled by the legal government. In 1928, Bolín became the regional delegate of the Spanish National Tourist Board in Andalusia, the Canary Islands and the Spanish protectorate in Morocco by royal appointment.

=== Spanish Civil War ===
In late May 1936 in Reigate, Bolín and his family met with Paco Andes, a former cabinet minister of Miguel Primo de Rivera. Before Bolín left, Andes pulled him aside and said, "something is brewing in Spain. No date has been fixed, but something is bound to happen soon. Are you willing to act?" To this, Bolín replied that he was "more than willing" and "expressed the hope that General Franco would direct the rising", according to his memoir.

In July 1936, Bolín played an important role in the events leading up to the Spanish Civil War by organising the flight of a de Havilland Dragon Rapide aircraft from Croydon to the Canary Islands to transport General Francisco Franco from the Canaries to Spanish Morocco. Franco arrived on July 19 in Tétouan to lead the insurrection and to prepare the transport of the troops to the mainland. That was some days after the murder of José Calvo Sotelo, which triggered the generals to start their rebellion earlier than foreseen, on July 18. Otherwise the rebellion would have come probably a few weeks later. The flight itself was planned over lunch at Simpson's-in-the-Strand, where Bolín met with Douglas Francis Jerrold, the conservative Roman Catholic editor of The English Review, and Major Hugh Pollard. Pollard contracted Captain Cecil Bebb as pilot and took his daughter Diana Pollard and one of her friends to pose as tourists.

Immediately thereafter, Bolín flew to Rome to request in the name of Franco the delivery of twelve bombers with a sufficient number of bombs. At first, Benito Mussolini refused, because he did not have proof that the initiative was backed up by General Emilio Mola to whom he had promised help in 1934. On July 25 Mussolini gave his permission to the delivery after a message from Mola that consented. The bombers were necessary to break the blockade of the Moroccan waters by Loyalist Spanish warships and enable Franco's troops to reach the mainland. Bolín was passenger of one of the nine bombers that reached Spanish Morocco safely. Two planes crashed, and one made a forced landing in French Morocco.

In return for his assistance, Bolin was appointed by Franco honorary captain of the Spanish Foreign Legion. Other Legion officers did not take Bolín seriously since he knew nothing of military matters. He also became Franco's chief press officer and during the Spanish Civil War was responsible for taking journalists on tours of the various battlefields. His fierce advocacy for Franco earned him the dislike of left-wing journalists. According to Noel Monks, whenever correspondents came across a group of newly executed Republicans, typically behind a farmhouse in a recently captured village, Bolín would spit on them and call them "vermin". Bolín ensured that no correspondents were allowed into Toledo for two days following its occupation on 27 September 1936. He harboured a particular hatred for Arthur Koestler and vowed that if he ever laid hands on him, he would "shoot him like a dog". After the fall of Málaga to Italian forces, which had been sent by Mussolini to support Franco's rebellion, Koestler was sheltering with Sir Peter Chalmers Mitchell, a 72 year-old-retired zoologist (and driving force behind Whipsnade Zoo), who had also provided safe haven to Bolín's own uncle and aunt and their five daughters during the early months of the rebellion. Bolín arrested them both.

Mitchell was quickly released thanks to his diplomatic connections, but Koestler languished for several months in a fascist prison under a death sentence. The episode is recorded both in Mitchell's memoirs and in Koestler's Spanish Testament. Bolín's efforts during the Civil War could not outdo the clever propaganda of the Republican government, which he claimed had generally a much better hearing in the western media only because the rebels had no telephone facilities and so messages from journalists working in their territory reached the Western world much later.

== Later life ==
In 1967, Bolin published his memoirs, Spain, the Vital Years. He died in 1969.

== Notes ==
Citations
