= Douglas Francis Jerrold =

British journalist and publisher (1893–1964)

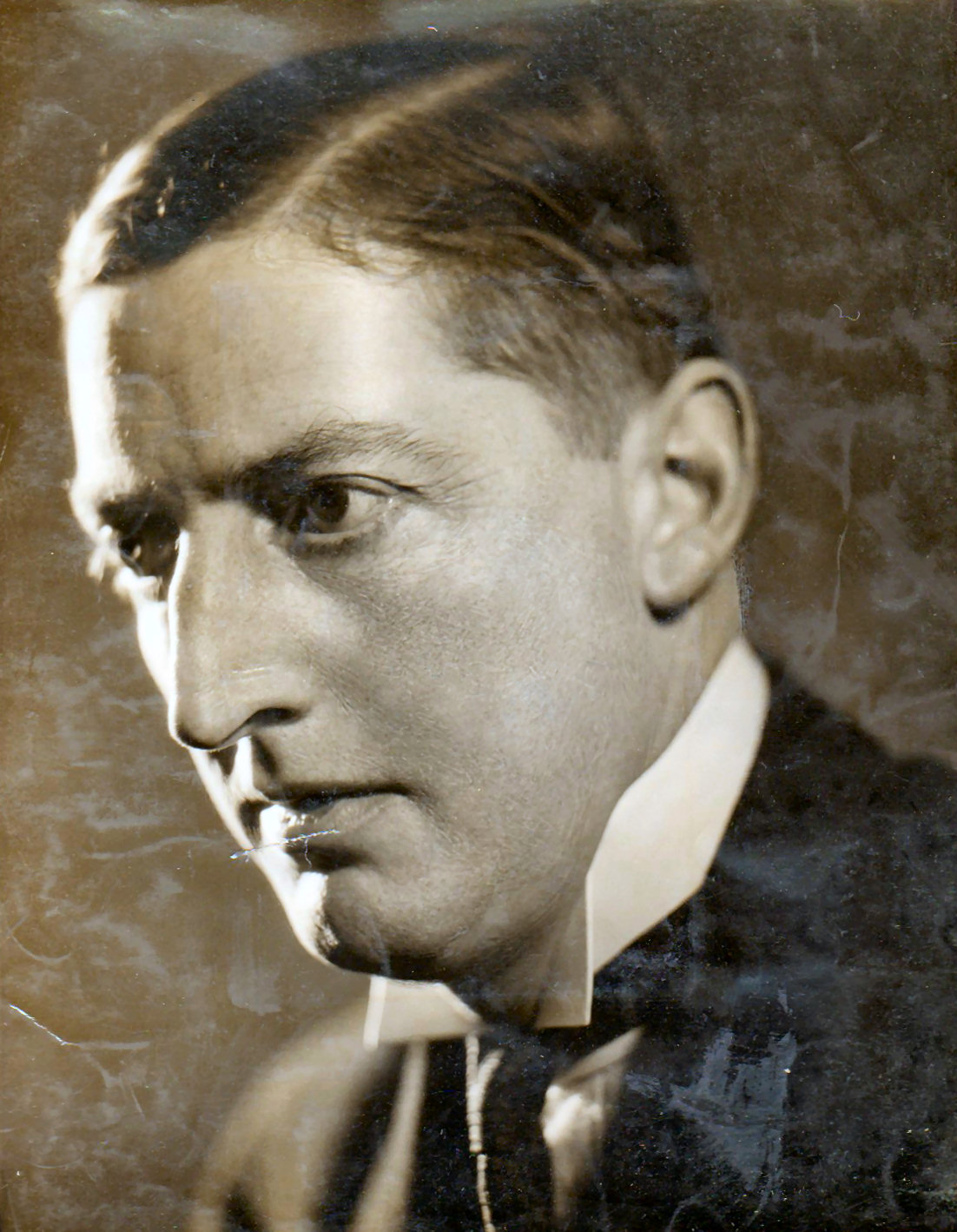
- Born: 3 August 1893; Scarborough, England
- Died: 21 July 1964 (aged 71); London, England
- Education: Middle Temple
- Occupations: Journalist, publisher
- Writing career
- Period: 1893–1964
- Genre: Journalism

Douglas Francis Jerrold (Scarborough 3 August 1893 – 21 July 1964) was a British journalist and publisher. As editor of The English Review from 1931 to 1935, he was a vocal supporter of fascism in Italy and of Francoist Spain. He was personally involved in the events of July 1936 when two British intelligence agents piloted an aircraft from the Canary Islands to Spanish Morocco, taking General Francisco Franco with them and thereby helped to spark the military coup that ignited the Spanish Civil War.

== Early life ==
Jerrold was born in Scarborough in 1893, the son of Sidney Douglas Jerrold and Maud Francis Goodrich. He was a descendant of the Victorian dramatist and writer Douglas William Jerrold, one of the founders of Punch. He served as an officer in the Hawke Battalion of the Royal Naval Division during the First World War, seeing action at Gallipoli and on the Western Front. One of his fellow officers in the Hawke Battalion was the writer and humourist A P Herbert. In the early postwar period, Jerrold wrote histories of both the Battalion and the Division.

Jerrold was admitted to the Middle Temple on 20 November 1918, but was not called to the Bar.

== Career ==
=== Publishing ===
Jerrold became a director of Eyre & Spottiswoode in 1929, chairman in 1945 and retired in 1958. Between 1944 and 1948, Graham Greene was his director, in charge of the fiction list.

=== Politics ===
Jerrold was at his core a Tory and was hopeful of a career in politics, but he was critical of the alliance between the Conservative Party and big business; he felt that the party had become too nakedly capitalist. His views were not popular with the party leadership, and in 1931, Jerrold's hopes of a parliamentary seat were dashed by Central Office.

In 1930 Jerrold published a pamphlet, The Lie about the War. This publication attacked the depiction of the First World War in contemporary literature. Jerrold argued in the pamphlet that the First World War had been both a necessary war and a just war, despite the terrible suffering that it had entailed. Jerrold's pamphlet singled out the work of Ernest Hemingway, Richard Aldington, Robert Graves and Henri Barbusse for censure, claiming such works gave a misleading picture of military life. By contrast, Jerrold praised Undertones of War by Edmund Blunden as a realistic and admirable account of the conflict.

=== The English Review and the New English Review ===
Sidelined in mainstream politics, Jerrold became editor of The English Review, which he ran from 1931 to 1935. He advocated "real Toryism as opposed to the plutocratic Conservatism represented by the official party", under the relatively liberal leadership of Stanley Baldwin. He was a romantic anticapitalist and a devout Roman Catholic who was strongly attracted to the fascism of Mussolini's Italy, the Catholic nationalism of Franco, and the rule of Antonio Salazar in Portugal as well as to that of Engelbert Dollfuss in Austria. In addition, Jerrold, unlike his English Review colleague, the historian Sir Charles Petrie, was an imperialist who was opposed to Britain's policy in India, which had recognised the inevitability of self-rule. Moreover, Jerrold favoured a greatly-strengthened executive government at home, if not an outright dictatorship. If not a fascist, Jerrold was undeniably sympathetic to fascism.

On 21 November 1933, Jerrold's English Review hosted a dinner, presided over by Lord Carson, which was intended to be the climax of Jerrold's campaign for a new corporatist approach to government. However, the dinner was not as successful as Jerrold hoped. The 350 guests were united in their opposition to the National Government but otherwise held divergent views. Soon afterwards, Jerrold gave his views on parliamentary democracy:

There is no folly more fashionable than the saying that the English will never tolerate a dictatorship. Under constitutional forms of a very flimsy character the English have invariably insisted on being governed either by a close oligarchy or a virtual dictatorship.... It is because the party machines have notably failed to govern that they are losing the public confidence, and unless Parliament under universal franchise can fulfil the indispensable task of leadership, a dictatorship is not only inevitable but necessary.

– Douglas Jerrold, Current comments, English Review, December 1933

In 1945, he launched and ran a successor, the New English Review, later known as the English Review Magazine, with Charles Petrie and support from the Conservative Party. In 1950, it merged with the National Review.

=== Fascist sympathies ===
In a July 1933 article in the English Review, Jerrold argued that because of the threat of communism to Britain, "the forcible overthrow of Herr Hitler's administration would be a disaster". Jerrold also joined the January Club, founded by Oswald Mosley in January 1934, to generate sympathy and some element of respectability for fascism and particularly to court conservative opinion. The January Club was not explicitly fascist but was "in sympathy with the fascist movement". Meetings were held over dinners at London hotels, where its leaders advanced a corporatist agenda and insisted that "the present democratic system of government must be changed". However, Jerrold was no Nazi and supported the efforts of Benito Mussolini to avenge the 1934 murder of Engelbert Dollfuss, which had been carried out in Austria by pro-Hitler forces.

=== Spanish Civil War ===
During the Spanish Civil War, Jerrold strongly supported the Nationalist cause of General Francisco Franco and was among those who argued that the destruction of Guernica had been caused not by Nationalist bombers but by retreating Republican forces.

In his 1938 book The Future of Freedom: Notes on Christianity and Politics, Jerrold outlined his support for the pro-Catholic dictatorships of Franco and Mussolini. He wrote, "Christians not only can but must wish and pray for General Franco's success".

Jerrold, in fact, took an active and personal role in Franco's successful coup. He had been involved in the events of July 1936, when Captain Cecil Bebb and Major Hugh Pollard piloted a de Havilland Dragon Rapide aircraft from the Canary Islands to Spanish Morocco, taking Franco with them and thereby igniting the Spanish Civil War. The flight itself was planned over lunch at Simpson's-in-the-Strand, where Jerrold met with the journalist Luis Bolín, London correspondent of the ABC newspaper and later Franco's senior press advisor. Jerrold then recruited Pollard to join the enterprise, along with Pollard's daughter Diana and one of her friends as "cover".

== Publications ==
- The Royal Naval Division, By Douglas Jerrold, With an Introduction by the Right Hon Winston S Churchill. Hutchinson and Co (1923).
- The Hawke Battalion Some Personal Records of Four Years, 1914-18. Ernest Benn Limited, London (1925).
- The War on Land, In the Main Theatres of War, 1914–1918, Comprising the Western Front, the Eastern Front, the Italian Front, the Balkans, and the Campaigns against Turkey . Ernest Benn Limited, London (1928)
- England. (1935). London: Arrowsmith. 240 pages
- Jerrold, Douglas, p.115, The Future of Freedom: Notes on Christianity and Politics Sheed and Ward, New York (1938) Retrieved 10 July 2012
- Britain and Europe from 1900 to 1940 . Collins, London (1941)
- England: Past, Present and Future . Norton, New York (1950)
- An Introduction to the History of England, from the Earliest Times to 1204 . Houghton Mifflin, New York (1952)
- The Lie about the West: A Response to Professor Toynbee's Challenge. Sheed and Ward, New York (1954)

== See also ==
- Charles Petrie (historian)
- Francis Yeats-Brown
