= Hugh Pollard (intelligence officer) =

British intelligence officer and author

Major Hugh Pollard
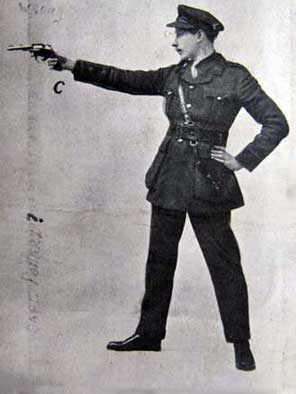
- Hugh Bertie Campbell Pollard. Author, firearms expert and secret service agent
- Born: 6 January 1888; London, England
- Died: March 1966; Midhurst district, Sussex, England
- Citizenship: British
- Occupations: Intelligence agent, Writer
- Notable work: A Busy Time in Mexico: An Unconventional Record Of a Mexican Incident (1913), The Story of Ypres (1917), The Book of the Pistol and Revolver (1917), The Secret Societies of Ireland, Their Rise and Progress (1922), A History of Firearms, Automatic Pistols, Fox Hunting - The Mystery Of Scent, British & American Game-birds, Hard Up on Pegasus, The Keeper's Book; a Guide to the Duties of a Gamekeeper
- Spouse: Ruth M Gibbons
- Awards: Knights Cross of the Imperial Order of the Yoke and Arrows

Major Hugh Bertie Campbell Pollard (6 January 1888 in London – March 1966 in Midhurst district) was an author, journalist, adventurer, firearms expert, and a British SOE officer. He is chiefly known for his intelligence work during the Irish War of Independence and for the events of July 1936, when he and Cecil Bebb flew General Francisco Franco from the Canary Islands to Morocco, thereby helping to trigger the outbreak of the Spanish Civil War. He served his country in both World Wars and was the author of many published works on weaponry, in particular on sporting firearms.

== Early life ==
Hugh Bertie Campbell Pollard was born in London on 6 January 1888, the son of the physician Joseph Pollard. At nine years of age he was sent to Westminster School as a day boy, but spent much of his time on his grandfather's estate in Hertfordshire, where he became an expert shot and first developed what became a lifelong interest in hunting and firearms. At fifteen years of age he left Westminster and joined the engineering firm Armstrong Whitworth. Until 1908 he attended the Crystal Palace School of Practical Engineering.

== Career ==
=== Activities in Morocco and Mexico ===
In 1908 Pollard joined the Redmond-Hardwick exploration syndicate in Morocco, where he participated in the revolution in Morocco which deposed the Sultan Abdelaziz and replaced him with his brother Abd al-Hafid. He returned to England in 1909, where he took a Royal Geographical Society course.

In 1911 he travelled to Tapachula, a remote corner of Mexico in the state of Chiapas, where he engaged in a number of adventures (as narrated by himself), including a risky mission to collect rent from a remote coffee plantation, and the shooting of much wild game. Along the way he became fluent in Spanish. He also became involved in the escape of Porfirio Diaz from Mexico. His recollections of these adventures were published in 1913 in his memoir (the first of many books) titled "A Busy Time in Mexico - An Unconventional Record of a Mexican Incident". Pollard wrote that, in Mexico, "the people in the next village, or over the next mountain, or in the next state, are inevitably evildoers, murderers, and bandits."

Returning to London, Pollard was commissioned as an officer into the Territorial Army in May 1912. At the same time he began his career as a journalist, serving as assistant editor of The Cinema, editor of The Territorial Monthly and technical editor of The Autocycle. He also became a correspondent for the Daily Express.

=== World War I ===
When World War I broke out Pollard was mobilised as officer of despatch riders in London, and in November 1914 he was seconded to the Intelligence Corps as a staff lieutenant. Pollard served during both the First Battle of Ypres and Second Battle of Ypres, both bloody and strategically inconclusive. Blown off his motorcycle and wounded, he was invalided home, and granted five months home leave to recuperate. During this time he worked for his new father-in-law, James Gibbons, at his engineering factory in Wolverhampton managing the production of hand grenades. He continued to write, producing The Story of Ypres, a well-received account of the battles.

At around this time Pollard began his propaganda-writing career for Wellington House, by inventing a "Phantom Russian Army" which was allegedly travelling by train from Scotland to support the British Expeditionary Force; a story which was even given credence by The New York Times. Pollard also invented an anti-German atrocity propaganda story about "corpse factories", in which the German government was said to be melting down corpses to make margarine. As a result of his creativity, Pollard found himself recruited by MI7.

By this time Pollard had become a noted firearms expert, and in 1917 he published another book: The Book of the Pistol and Revolver.

=== Ireland (1919–1921) ===
After the War, Pollard was sent to Dublin Castle in Ireland as an Intelligence officer. During the Irish War of Independence (1919–1921), Pollard was Press Officer of the Information Section of the Royal Irish Constabulary (RIC). Together with the Section secretary, Captain William Darling, he produced the Weekly Summary, a weekly newspaper distributed to the police forces in Ireland.

He was also directly involved in two particularly bungled attempts at 'black propaganda'. One was the attempt to produce and distribute a fake version of the Irish Bulletin, the gazette of the Irish Republicans. The fraud was quickly exposed and the reliability of information emanating from Crown sources in Ireland severely damaged. A second incident involved the bizarre attempt to fake a military engagement in County Kerry (reported as the 'Battle of Tralee'). The press-release included photographs of the purported scene of the battle. These were republished in a number of Irish and English papers before the actual location was identified as Vico Road in Dalkey, a quiet seaside Dublin suburb. The entire event had been staged by Pollard and Captain Garro-Jones, a colleague of Major Cecil Street, and was without foundation. In December 1920 in the House of Commons, the British government denied any knowledge of these pictures or the circumstances in which they were produced.

Following the Anglo-Irish Treaty, Pollard recorded his interpretation of the history of Irish nationalist organisations in Secret Societies of Ireland, Their Rise and Progress. He alleged that the Lord Mayor of Cork, Tomás Mac Curtain, had been assassinated by the Irish Republican Brotherhood (IRB), rather than by forces acting for the British Crown.

=== Spanish Civil War ===
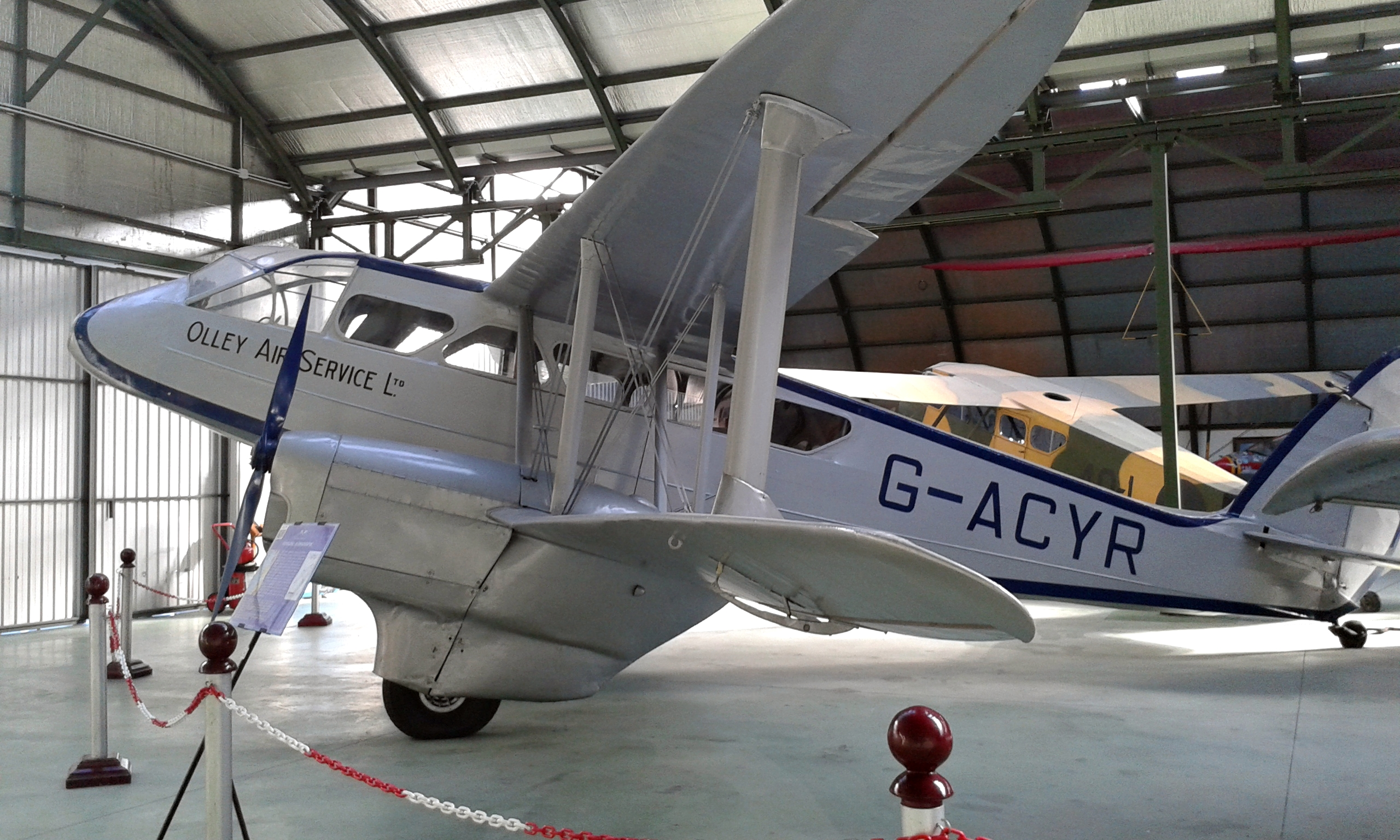
De Havilland Dragon Rapide, G-ACYR, the aircraft that carried Franco to Morocco 1936. Photographed at the Museo del Aire. Madrid (2014)

Pollard was a devout Roman Catholic and a supporter of the conservative side in Spain in the years leading up to the Spanish Civil War. He and Cecil Bebb played an important role in the events leading up to the outbreak of hostilities. Pollard was described by the Nationalist volunteer Peter Kemp as being "one of those romantic Englishmen who specialise in other countries' revolutions".

During lunch at Simpson's-in-the-Strand, Douglas Francis Jerrold, the conservative Roman Catholic editor of the English Review (and also a British intelligence officer), met with the journalist Luis Bolín, London correspondent of the monarchist and right wing newspaper ABC and later Franco's senior press advisor. They conceived a plan to move General Franco from the Canary Islands to Spanish Morocco, where the Army of Africa was stationed. The Madrid government recognised that Franco was a danger to the Spanish Republic, and had sent him to the Canaries to keep him away from political intrigue. If a Spanish plane flew to the islands, the authorities would most likely be alerted, but a British aircraft would attract little or no attention. Bolin asked Jerrold to find "two blondes and a trustworthy fellow" to carry out the mission, to make the group look like tourists. Jerrold rang Pollard from the restaurant (Pollard was fluent in Spanish) and asked him if he could be ready to fly to Africa the following day, with two women as "cover"; Pollard, an anti-Communist who regarded it as "the duty of a good Catholic to help fellow Catholics in trouble", replied: "depends on the girls". Pollard was persuaded by Jerrold and Bolin to join the enterprise and he recruited his daughter Diana and her friend Dorothy Watson to accompany him. The group charted a de Havilland Dragon Rapide aircraft, piloted by Cecil Bebb, which flew out of Croydon airport, London, at 07.15 on the morning of July 11, 1936, bound for the Canaries. Pollard and Bebb delivered Franco to Tetuán on July 19. The general assumed command of the Army of Africa, which had rebelled two days earlier and already secured most of Spanish Morocco.

It is possible that British intelligence services may have been complicit in the flight. However it is not clear yet how much the British government knew or was involved in these activities, or if the Britons involved were in fact acting on their own. Britain remained officially neutral during the Spanish Civil War.

The adventure earned Pollard the sobriquet The Spanish Pimpernel from Life Magazine. After the war, in 1958, Pollard and his companions were personally decorated by General Francisco Franco, who awarded all four the Knights Cross of the Imperial Order of the Yoke and Arrows.

Pollard continued to support the Nationalist cause. In 1937, after the bombing of Guernica, Pollard wrote a letter to The Times stating that Guernica was a "perfectly legitimate" target, being a centre of small arms manufacture, one which supplied weapons to terrorists:

The bombing of Guernica is not an attack on an unimportant civilian centre. Guernica is almost as much a centre for the manufacture of small arms at Eibar. [...] Arms of Spanish make have reached terrorists in India and Egypt and are also widely distributed in France. [...] No one who knows the industries of this region can believe that Eibar and Guernica are not perfectly legitimate objectives for attack.

Pollard argued later in his letter that the Basques who supported the Spanish Republic were "simply reaping what they have sown":

There need be little sentiment for [the Viscayans], for no community has ever tried to make more trouble in the world by the unrestricted sale of arms than these Basque industrialists. Autonomy for the Basque simply means sales of arms without control—and the world in general has had about enough of this. They are simply reaping what they have sown.

=== World War II ===
When war broke out in 1939, Pollard briefly fell under suspicion for fascist sympathies. In December 1939 West Sussex police raided the Kent flat of Nora Dacre-Fox, whom MI5 suspected of being a fascist sympathiser. During the search, police discovered Pollard's name in her address book. Pollard was to be arrested, but MI5 instructed their regional liaison officer in Kent to "lay off" Pollard.

On 31 January 1940 MI6 appointed Pollard head of the semi-autonomous "Section D" in Madrid. Section D was officially a sub-division of MI6, tasked with engaging in clandestine sabotage in Europe. In May 1940 Pollard was involved in a short-lived and unsuccessful plot to restore King Alfonso XIII to the Spanish throne, in order to reduce German and Italian influence over the Franco regime. Pollard traveled to Estoril, Portugal in 1940 where he was involved in smuggling around three hundred Republican Vickers machine guns, still in their packing crates, back to England. Of this adventure, Pollard wrote that he was “rather a good pirate in the best English tradition”.

However, by this time confidence in Pollard was waning; he had acquired a reputation for being "most indiscreet", and he left Section D later that year. Pollard spent much of the rest of the war at the Inspectorate of Armaments at the Woolwich Arsenal. In Pollard's file, a letter from one Colonel Jeffries, the Commandant of the Intelligence Corps, wrote: “Certain jobs Pollard apparently could do well, but he was definitely unreliable where money and drink was concerned.”

As the Allied armies advanced into Germany, Pollard was sent to Thuringia with the forces of General Patton, in technical intelligence on small arms. Here, Pollard removed many weapons before the Russians occupied the area. Later on, he became o.c. Intelligence, Technical, in Vienna where, he had to deal with many looters. Pollard wrote, “in three weeks I stopped all the nonsense...with sawn-off shotguns.”

Pollard's personal SOE file was released after the war, revealing him to have been an experienced British intelligence officer.

== After the war ==
After the war Pollard retired to the country, leading a quiet life in Clover Cottage in Midhurst, West Sussex. Pollard listed his hobbies in Who's Who as "hunting and shooting", and was a member of Lord Leconfield's hunt. He died in 1966, firmly anti-Communist to the end. In the same year he was interviewed by The Guardian, the month before his death, in which he was quoted as saying that Communists "are better put down than anything".

== Reputation ==
Douglas Jerrold of The English Review said of Pollard that he "looked and behaved like a German Crown Prince and had a habit of letting off revolvers in any office he happened to visit". Jerrold once asked Pollard if he had ever killed anybody; Pollard replied: "never accidentally". The journalist Macdonald Hastings wrote of Pollard that he was "a fascinating person, who probably had a greater impact on events than he cared anybody should know. If you can unravel him you need to know all the tricks of Mr. Smiley and James Bond. I confess that all I know about him is mischief. He was a remarkable man".

== Author and firearms expert ==
Pollard was a much-published expert on firearms, having written the 'small arms' section in the official War Office textbook. His history of the Second Battle of Ypres is still in print today.

- The Book of the Pistol and Revolver, London, McBride, Nast & Co., 1917. (Available for web viewing here).
- Automatic Pistols, London, Sir Isaac Pitman and Sons, 1920.
- Shot-Guns; Their History and Development, London, Sir Isaac Pitman and Sons, 1923.
- A History of Firearms, London, Geoffrey Bles, 1926.
- The Sportsman's Cookery Book, London, Country Life, 1926.
- The Gun Room Guide, London, Eyre & Spottiswoode, 1930.
- Game Birds and Game Bird Shooting, Boston, Houghton Mifflin, 1936.
- The Story of Ypres, at Internet Archive also ISBN 978-1-103-81240-0
- A Busy Time in Mexico: An Unconventional Record Of a Mexican Incident, Internet Archive also ISBN 978-0-217-66092-1
- Fox Hunting - The Mystery Of Scent
- British & American Game-birds, London, Eyre & Spottiswoode, 1939
- The Secret Societies of Ireland, Their Rise and Progress Internet Archive (1922)
- Hard Up on Pegasus, by Hugh B C Pollard, London, Eyre & Spottiswoode, 1931. ASIN: B0006ALQ7A
- The keeper's book; a guide to the duties of a gamekeeper (1910) with Sir Peter Jeffrey Mackie

== See also ==
- Cairo Gang
