= Classic Air Force =

- Formation: 2012
- Founder: Mike Collett
- Dissolved: 2016
- Type: Non-Profit Organisation
- Location: Coventry Airport
- Key people: Tim Skeet - Chairman; Mike Collett - Trustee; David Blackburn - Trustee; Alan Walker - Trustee
- Website: www.classicairforce.com
- Formerly called: Air Atlantique Classic Flight

Classic Air Force was a charitably-based aircraft preservation organisation sited in Coventry, West Midlands. Specialising in classic aircraft from the period between the end of the Second World War and the close of the Cold War, it preserved – in flying condition where possible - notable and rare aircraft from the period. CAF was the public face of The Classic Aircraft Trust, which was set up in 2012 specifically to manage the preservation and museum activities. Classic Air Force closed down in early 2016.

The organisation's main site between March 2015 and February 2016 was Coventry Airport (Baginton) which hosted the organisation's main maintenance and restoration facilities as well as the majority of the airworthy fleet. Previously (between 2013 and March 2015) the main site was at Newquay.

Classic Air Force closed its Coventry museum in October 2015.

== History ==
The Classic Air Force was a charitably-based continuation of Classic Flight, which in itself was a development of Air Atlantique. Originally set up as an air taxi operation in 1969, the company adopted the Air Atlantique brand in 1977 when it began charter operations with the Douglas DC-3s that were to become its signature. In 2006 the classic aircraft operation was turned into an entity in itself with the creation of the Air Atlantique Classic Flight.

In 2012 it was decided to apply for charitable status to allow the preservation of historic and rare aircraft beyond the lifetimes of its founders. The Classic Aircraft Trust was established, and it is this body that managed the operation. The Trust secured a lease on a large curtilage of land within Newquay Airport's growing Aerohub. Most of the aircraft of the Classic Flight were donated to the charity, and several additional machines were obtained.

The Newquay site opened as an aviation museum on 31 March 2013 and closed during March 2015.

== Operations ==
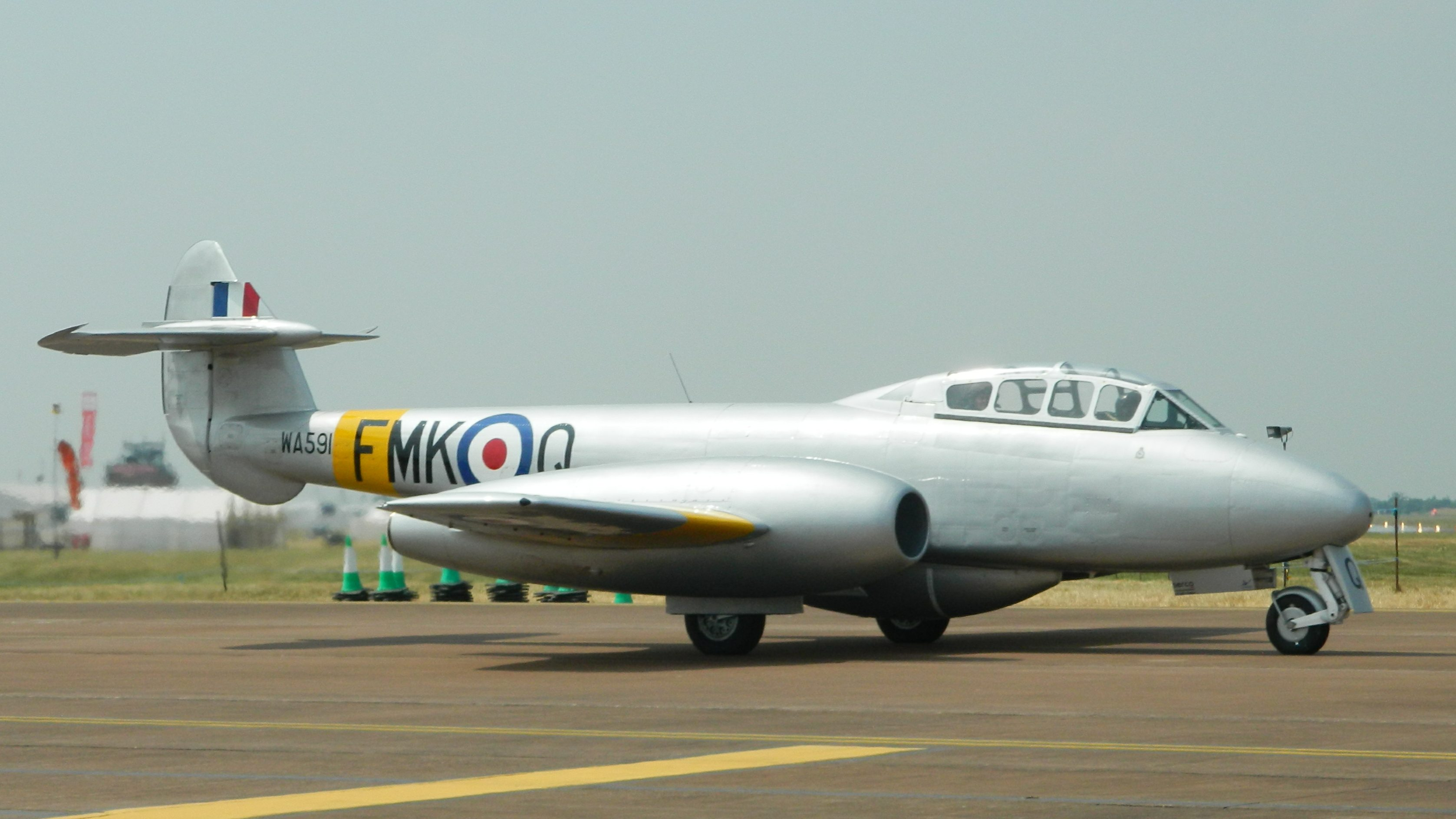
Gloster Meteor T.7 G-BWMF at the Royal International Air Tattoo in 2013

Most of the former Classic Air Force aircraft are still flying but have now been sold or awaiting sale. Until the end of the 2015 season, the aircraft participated regularly in flying displays and airshows around the UK.

The trust also operated pleasure flights for members of the public, in the de Havilland Dragon Rapide and Percival Proctor, and also aerobatic flights in the de Havilland Canada DHC-1 Chipmunk. A new type was added to the pleasure-flying fleet in May 2015, the de Havilland Dove, more commonly known as the Devon in Royal Air Force (RAF) service.

Between 2012 and 2013 the main base was at Coventry Airport which was primarily the organisation's maintenance and restoration location, but since April 2014 it was also open to the public at weekends, with free admission. While this site was in principle a working area, two static display aircraft were open for public tours. These were the Avro Shackleton and Hawker Siddeley Nimrod. Coventry had been the only base used by Air Atlantique and Classic Flight - operations only moved to Newquay upon the birth of the Classic Air Force in 2012.

Between 2013 and March 2015 the main base was transferred to Newquay Airport, in the 70,000 square foot Hangar 404 capable of housing 25 of the trust's aircraft. The hangar was previously used to house three RAF Hawker Siddeley Nimrods. The museum opened on 31 March 2013, and was open to the public between April and October. Smaller buildings housed a large model display, bookshop, cafe, gift shop and other aviation-related displays and activities.

However, during early March 2015 it announced it was moving to a landside portion of Newquay Airport so the airworthy aircraft were moved back to Coventry. During the latter part of March it was announced that the Newquay section was to be closed down during 2015 and the designation of main base was moved back to Coventry. Classic Air Force began operations at the original Coventry base on 2 May 2015, when they had a specially-organized airshow, called "Airbase gets Airborne".

In the summer of 2015 it was announced that the founder Mike Collett was to retire and that Classic Air Force would be closed down with the sale of all of the trust's aircraft and facilities by the early months of 2016.

As a charity, the trust raised most of its money from the visitors to the museum, as well as through fees for membership of the Classic Air Force. There was a team of volunteers, whose roles included engineers and pilots.

== Fleet ==
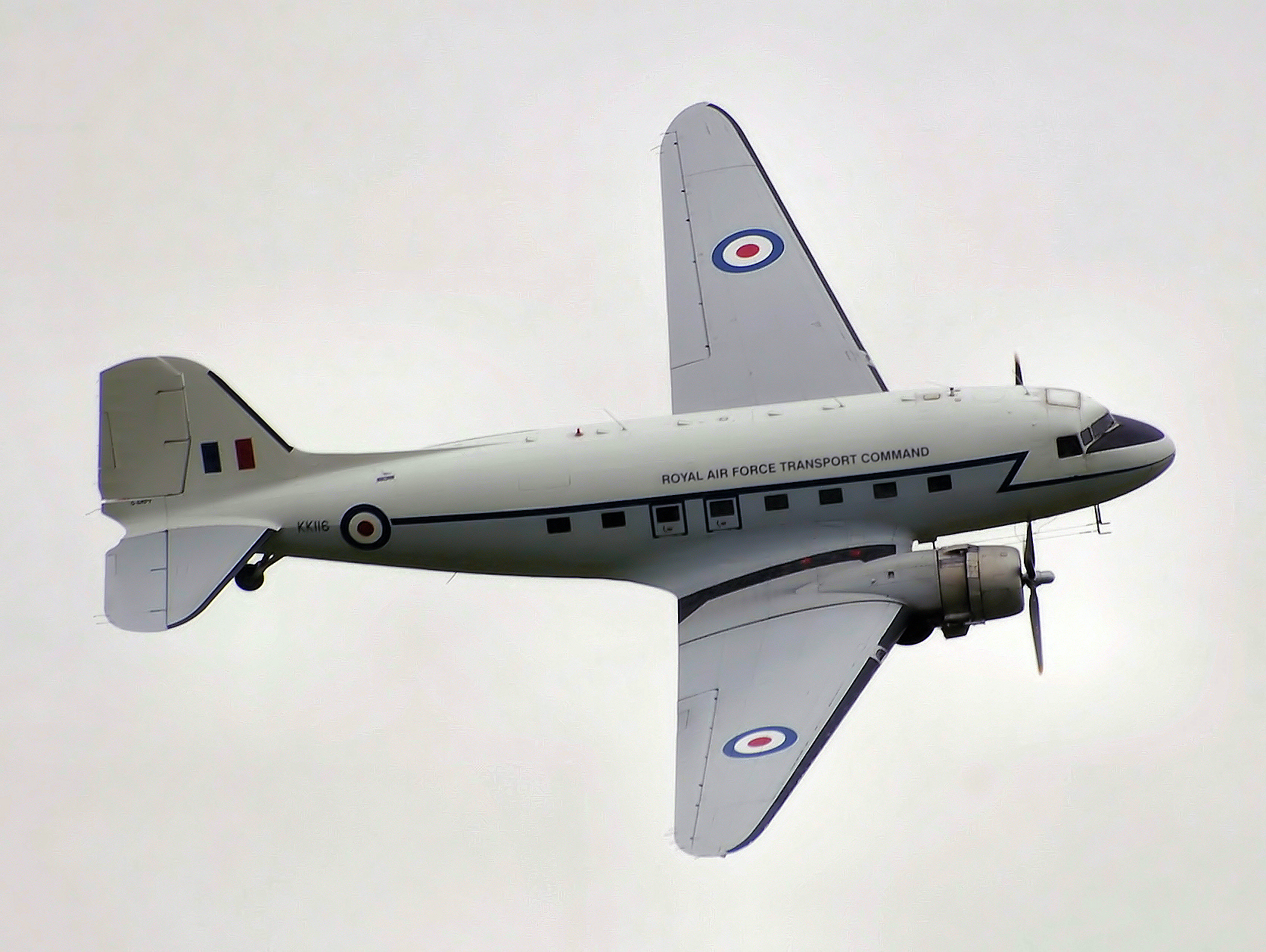
Douglas C-47 Dakota G-AMPY

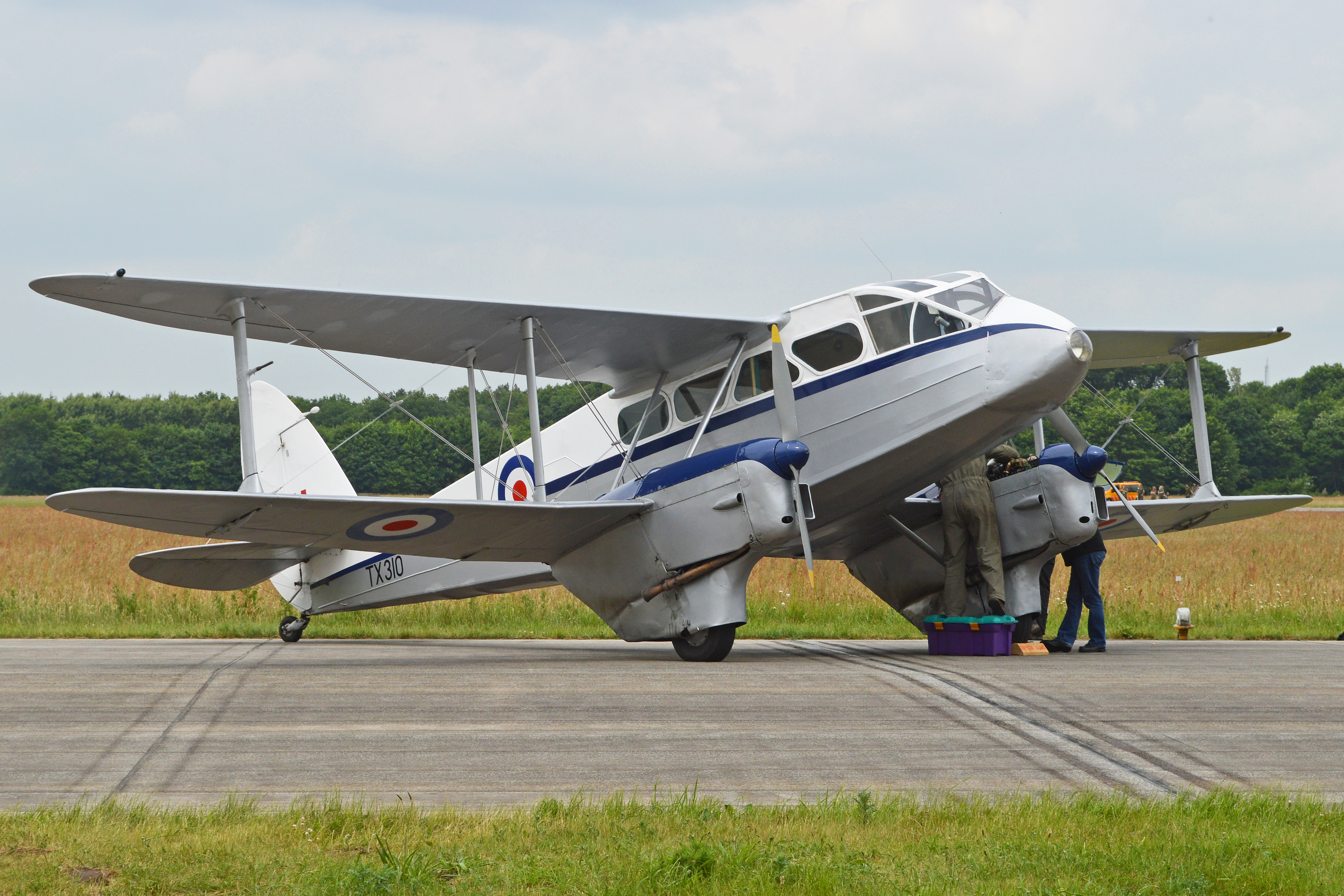
DH Dragon Rapide G-AIDL

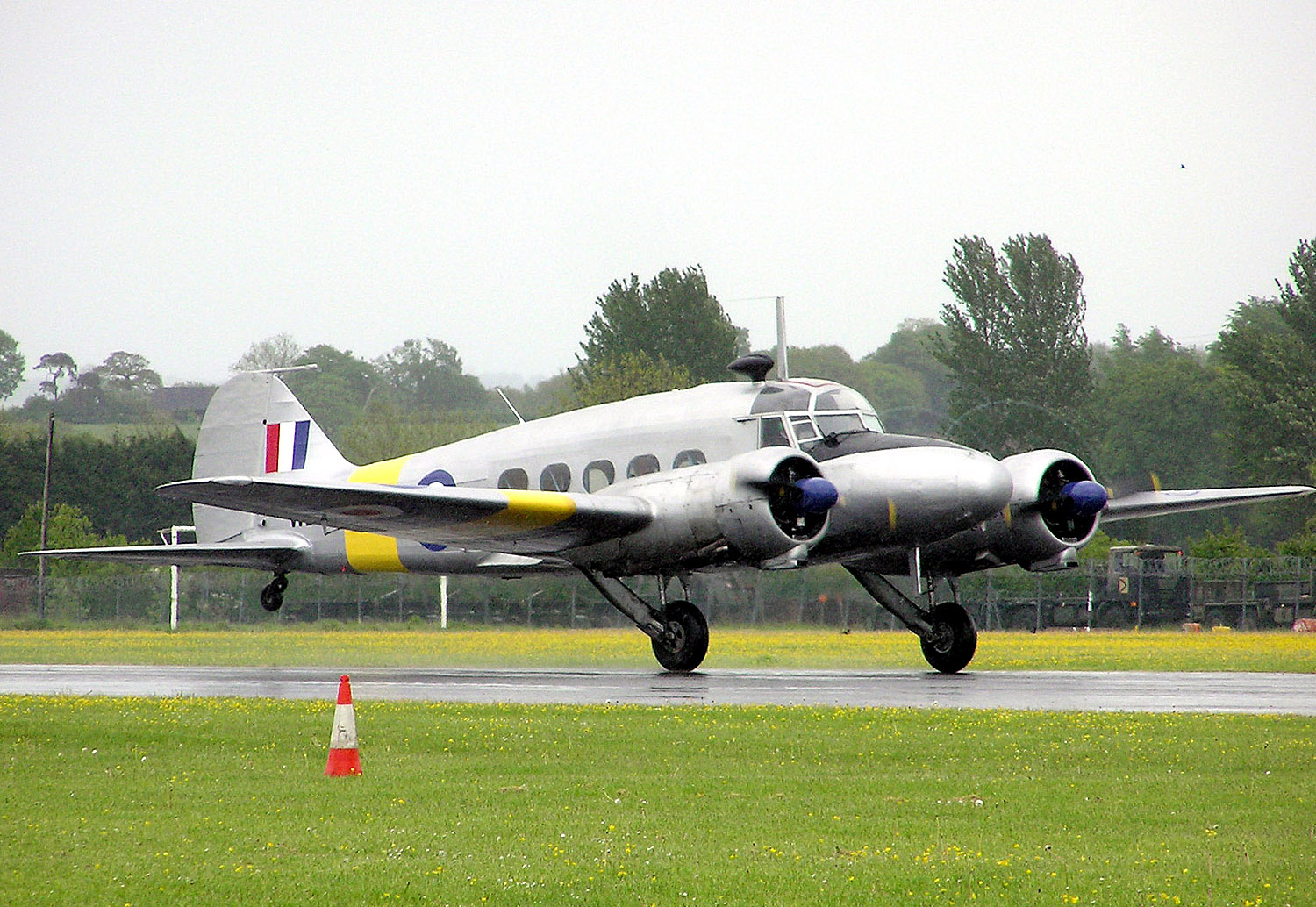
Avro Anson G-VROE taking off from Hullavington Airport in 2005

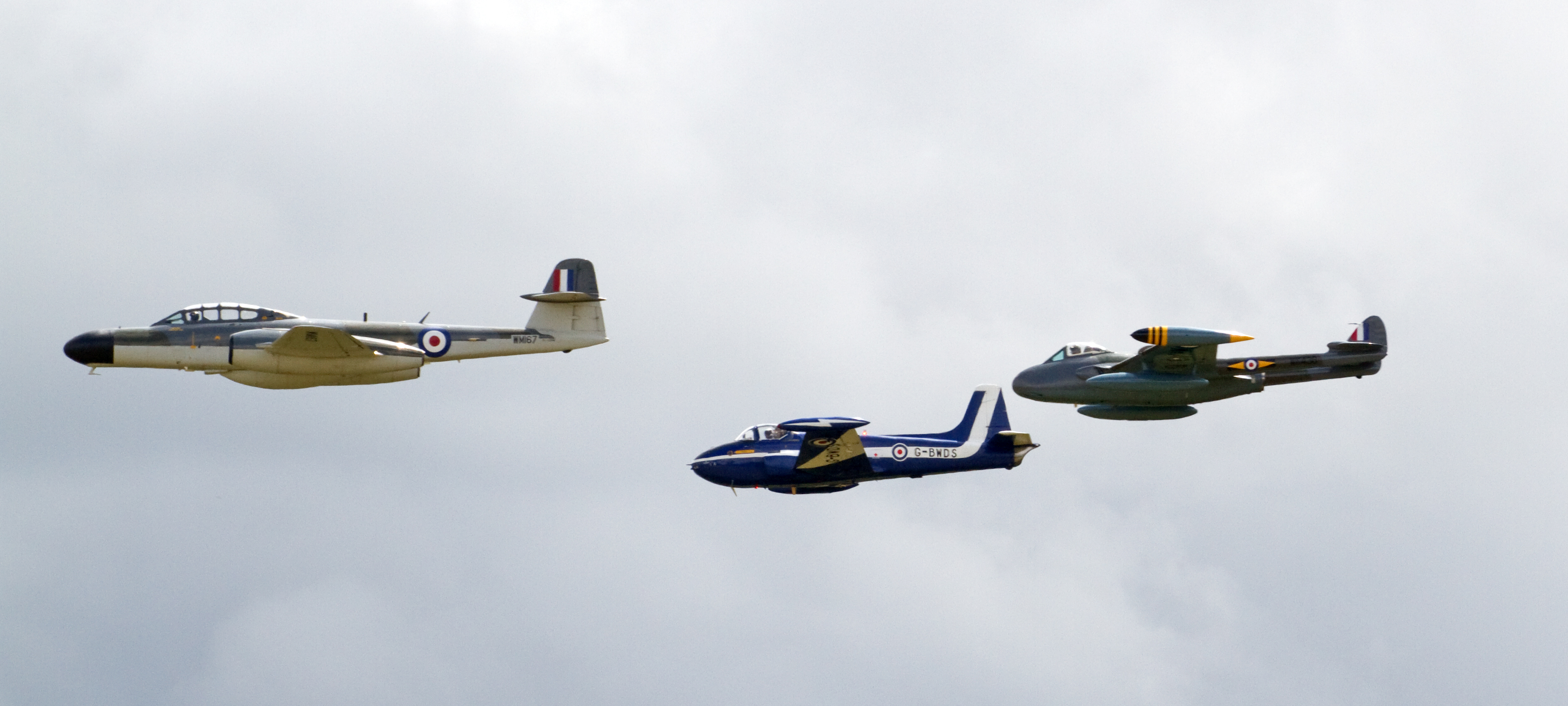
Meteor, Venom and Jet Provost at RAF Cosford in 2011

The trust operated a fleet of over 30 post-war aircraft some of which are up for sale:

=== Flyable ===
The flyable aircraft which were based at Coventry.

- 1 × Auster Autocrat – G-JAYI
- 1 × Avro Anson – G-VROE
- 1 × Chrislea Super Ace – G-AKVF
- 1 × de Havilland Chipmunk – G-APLO
- 1 × de Havilland Dove – G-DHDV
- 3 × de Havilland Dragon Rapide – G-AGTM, G-AIDL and G-AKRP
- 1 × de Havilland Vampire – G-HELV
- 2 × de Havilland Venom – G-DHVM and G-VENM
- 2 × Douglas Dakota – G-AMPY and G-ANAF
- 2 × English Electric Canberra – G-BVWC
- 2 × Gloster Meteor – G-LOSM and G-BWMF
- 1 × Percival Pembroke – G-BXES
- 1 × Percival Prentice – G-APJB
- 1 × Percival Proctor – G-AKIU

=== Formerly under maintenance at Coventry ===
- 1 × Scottish Aviation Twin Pioneer – G-APRS

=== Static Display at Coventry ===
- Hawker Siddeley Nimrod – XV232

=== Former Static Display at Newquay ===
- Note: All aircraft currently on loan to the Cornwall Aviation Heritage Centre.
- 1 × BAC One-Eleven – G-BGKE
- 1 × English Electric Canberra – G-CDSX
- 2 × Hawker Hunter – WT722 and WB188
- 1 × Hawker Sea Hawk – WV798
- 1 × Hawker Siddeley Harrier – XV753
- 1 × Vickers Varsity – WL679
- 1 × Vickers VC10 – ZA148
- 1 × de Havilland Sea Devon – G-SDEV / XK895

=== Stored ===
- 3 × de Havilland Dove – (G-BWWC, G-BWFB, G-ARHW)
