= Imperial Order of the Yoke and Arrows =

Title of honor of Spain under Francisco Franco

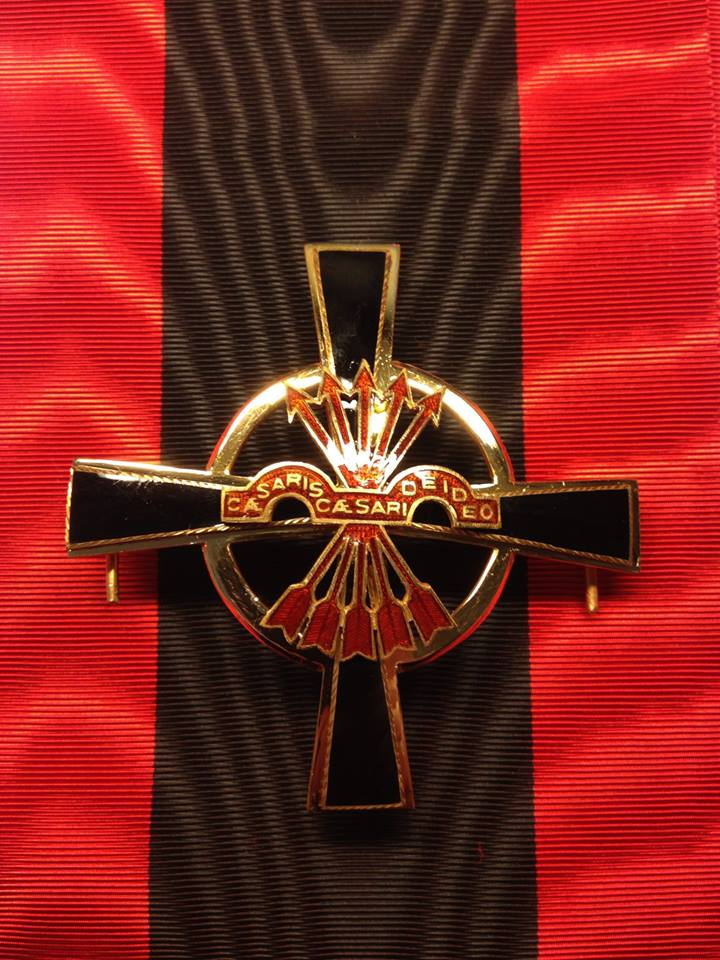
- Grand cross of the order.

Awarded by the (Spain) Spanish State
- Type: State/military order
- Established: 1 October 1937
- Motto: To Caesar what is Caesar's and to God what is God's (Al César lo que es del César y a Dios lo que es de Dios)
- Status: Abolished in 2022
- Founder: Francisco Franco
- Grades: Grand Collar; Grand Cross; Commendation with Plaque; Commendation; Medal

Statistics
- First induction: 1937
- Last induction: 1976

Precedence
- Next (higher): None, highest
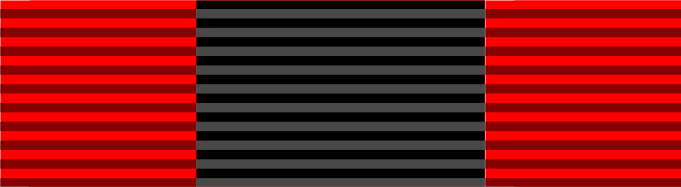
- Ribbon of the order

The Imperial Order of the Yoke and Arrows (Spanish: Orden Imperial del Yugo y las Flechas) was a Spanish state and military order. It was established in 1937 under the dictatorship of Caudillo Francisco Franco and discontinued in 1976 following Franco's death and during the Spanish transition to democracy. The order was formally abolished in October 2022 under the Democratic Memory Law. The order came in five grades.

== Names ==
- 1 October 1937: Grand Imperial Order of the Red Arrows (Spanish: Gran Orden Imperial de las Flechas Rojas)
- 1940: Imperial Order of the Yoke and Arrows (Spanish: Orden Imperial del Yugo y las Flechas)

== History ==
The Imperial Order of the Yoke and Arrows was established on 1 October 1937 by Francisco Franco during the second year of the Spanish Civil War. The symbol of the yoke and arrows, known in Spanish as the yugo y flechas, was a symbol of the Catholic Monarchs of Spain during the late 15th and early 16th century, but was also used as a symbol of Falangism. The motto of the order was "To Caesar what is Caesar's and to God what is God's," in reference to Jesus' saying from Chapter 22 in the Gospel of Matthew. On 27 January 1943, a decree established that the award would be one of the leaders of the Falangist movement in Francoist Spain. The award was discontinued in 1976 during the Spanish transition to democracy but was not formally abolished until 2022.

== Notable recipients ==
=== Spanish recipients ===
- (Spain) Juan Cabanas, 19 May 1939 (Commendation)
- (Spain) Francisco Javier Conde, 18 July 1952 (Commendation with Plaque)
- (Spain) Francisco Corbellini Obregón, 18 July 1952 (Commendation)
- (Spain) Manuel Díez-Alegría, 18 July 1969 (Grand Cross)
- (Spain) Francisco Franco, 1 October 1937 (Grand Collar)
- (Spain) Cristóbal González-Aller y Balseyro, 18 July 1952 (Commendation with Plaque)
- (Spain) Leonardo López Fernández, 18 July 1952 (Commendation)
- (Spain) José Martínez Maza, 18 July 1952 (Commendation with Plaque)
- (Spain) Aurelio Morazo Palomino, 18 July 1952 (Commendation)
- (Spain) Francisco Priede González, 18 July 1952 (Medal)
- (Spain) Manuel María Rincón, 19 March 1940 (Commendation)
- (Spain) Adolfo Suárez, 4 July 1975 (Grand Cross)
- (Spain) Theo Roger, 19 March 1940 (Commendation)
- (Spain) Luis Vilches, 18 July 1952 (Medal)

=== Foreign recipients ===
- (Kingdom of Italy) Arturo Bocchini, 19 May 1939 (Grand Cross)
- (Portugal) Óscar Carmona, 19 May 1939 (Grand Collar)
- (Portugal) Francisco Craveiro Lopes, 14 May 1953 (Grand Collar)
- Faisal II of Iraq, 18 May 1956 (Grand Cross)
- (Nazi Germany) Heinrich Himmler, 19 May 1939 (Grand Cross)
- (Nazi Germany) Adolf Hitler, 4 October 1937 (Grand Collar)
- (Nazi Germany) Georg Kolbe, 19 May 1939 (Commendation with Plaque)
- (Nazi Germany) Hans Lammers, 9 February 1941 (Medal)
- (Kingdom of Italy) Giandomenico De Marchis, 19 May 1939 (Commendation)
- Mohammed V of Morocco, 3 April 1956 (Grand Collar)
- (Kingdom of Italy) Eugenio Morelli, 7 May 1940 (Commendation)
- (Kingdom of Italy) Benito Mussolini, 4 October 1937 (Grand Collar)
- (Kingdom of Italy) Ettore Muti, 3 June 1940 (Grand Cross)
- (United Kingdom) Hugh Pollard, 4 October 1937 (Grand Cross)
- (Commonwealth of the Philippines) Claro M. Recto, 19 March 1940 (Commendation)
- (Nazi Germany) Joachim von Ribbentrop, 28 May 1940 (Grand Collar)
- (Peru) José de la Riva-Agüero y Osma, 9 October 1941 (Grand Cross)
- (Iraq) Nuri al-Said, 1 April 1952 (Grand Cross)
- Saud of Saudi Arabia, 1 April 1952 (Grand Cross)
- (Lebanon) Sami Solh, 1 April 1952 (Grand Cross)
- (Kingdom of Italy) Victor Emmanuel III, 4 October 1937 (Grand Collar)

== Gallery ==
Coat of arms of Francisco Franco with the award

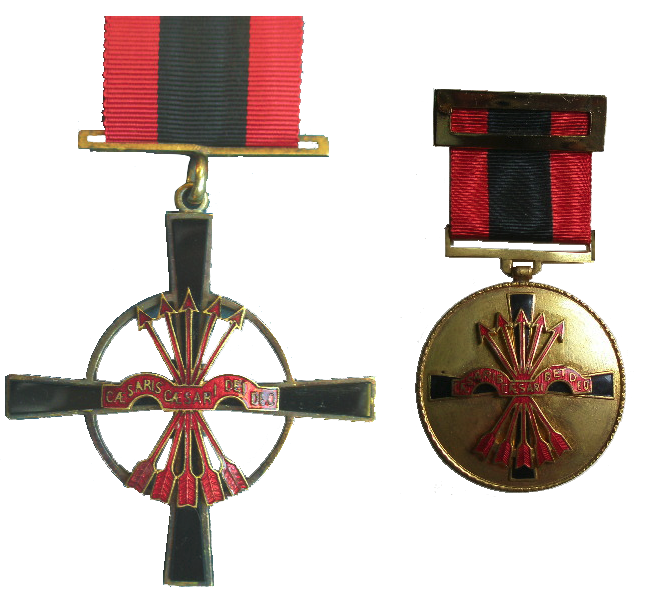
Medal of the award

== Classes ==
Categories
Grand Collar	Grand Cross	Commander with Star	Commander	Medal
	(Sash and Pendant)	(Star)		
(15 Knights Grand Collar maximum)	(250 Knights Grand Cross maximum)	(500 Commanders with Star maximum)	(no limitation of numbers)	(no limitation of numbers)

== See also ==
- Order of Cisneros
