= De Havilland Dragon Rapide =

1934 small airliner family

DH.89 Dragon Rapide/Dominie
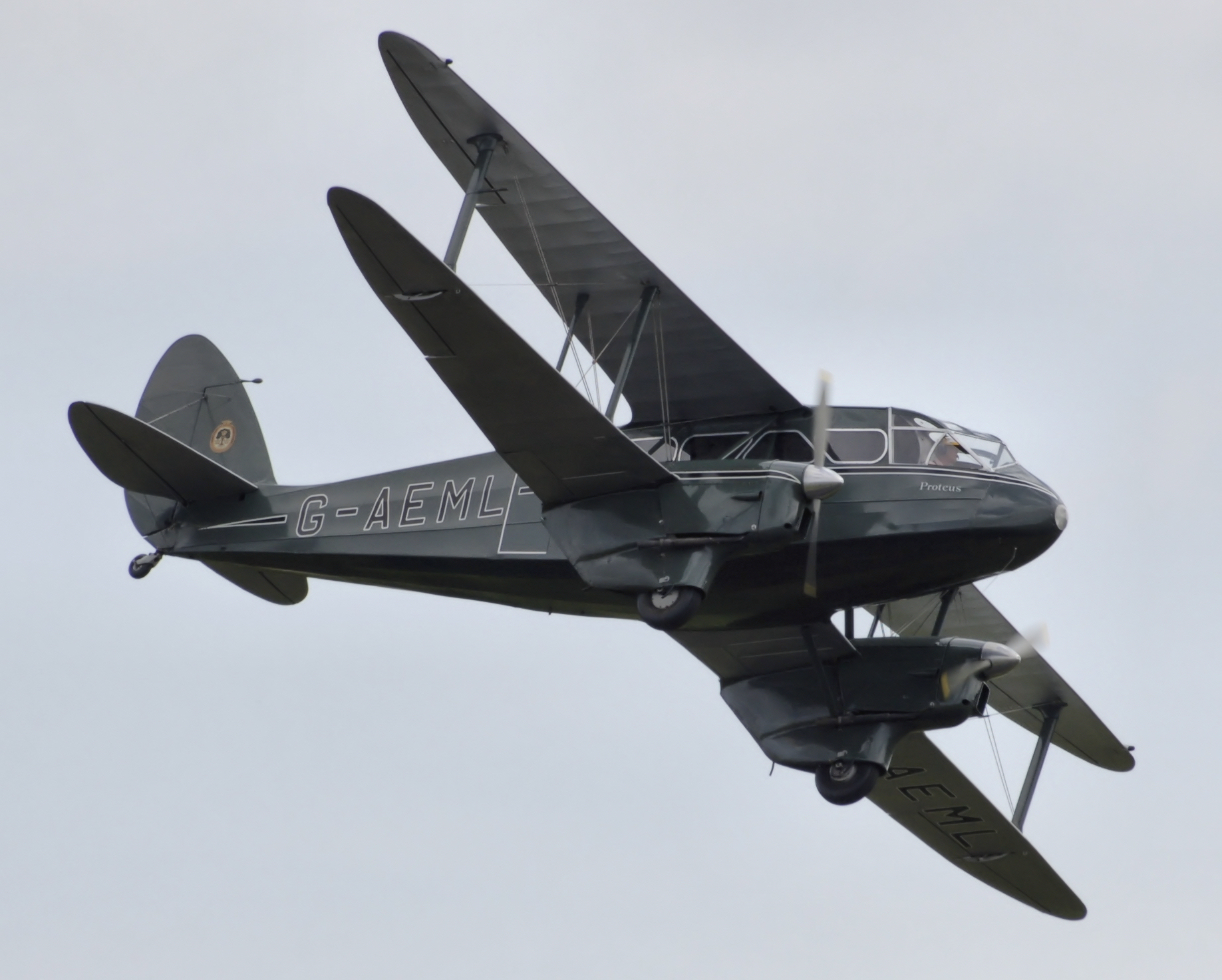
- DH.89 Dragon Rapide, G-AEML taking part in an airshow at Cotswold Airport, 2007

General information
- Type: Short-haul airliner
- Manufacturer: de Havilland
- Primary user: Royal Air Force
- Number built: 727

History
- Manufactured: 1934-1946
- First flight: 17 April 1934

The de Havilland DH.89 Dragon Rapide is a 1930s short-haul biplane airliner developed and produced by British aircraft company de Havilland. Capable of accommodating 6–8 passengers, it proved an economical and durable craft with its strong lightweight plywood construction.

Developed during the early 1930s, the Dragon Rapide was essentially a smaller, twin-engined version of the four-engined DH.86 Express, and shared a number of common features, such as its tapered wings, streamlined fairings and Gipsy Six engines. First named the "Dragon Six", the type was marketed as "Dragon Rapide" and later simply known as the "Rapide". Upon its introduction in summer 1934, it proved to be a popular aircraft with airlines and private civil operators alike, attaining considerable foreign sales in addition to its domestic use.

Upon the outbreak of the Second World War, many of the civil Rapides were pressed into service with the Royal Air Force (RAF) and Royal Navy. Referred to in military service by the name de Havilland Dominie, the type was employed for radio and navigation training, passenger transport and communications missions. British training aircraft had names with educational associations, and dominie is a Scots term for a school teacher.

Hundreds of Dominies were also constructed during the war. Other Rapides continued to be operated by British airlines throughout the war under the auspices of the Associated Airways Joint Committee (AAJC). Postwar, many military aircraft were returned to civilian service. Shortly after the end of the Second World War, de Havilland introduced a Dragon Rapide replacement, the de Havilland Dove.

== Design and development ==
=== Origins ===
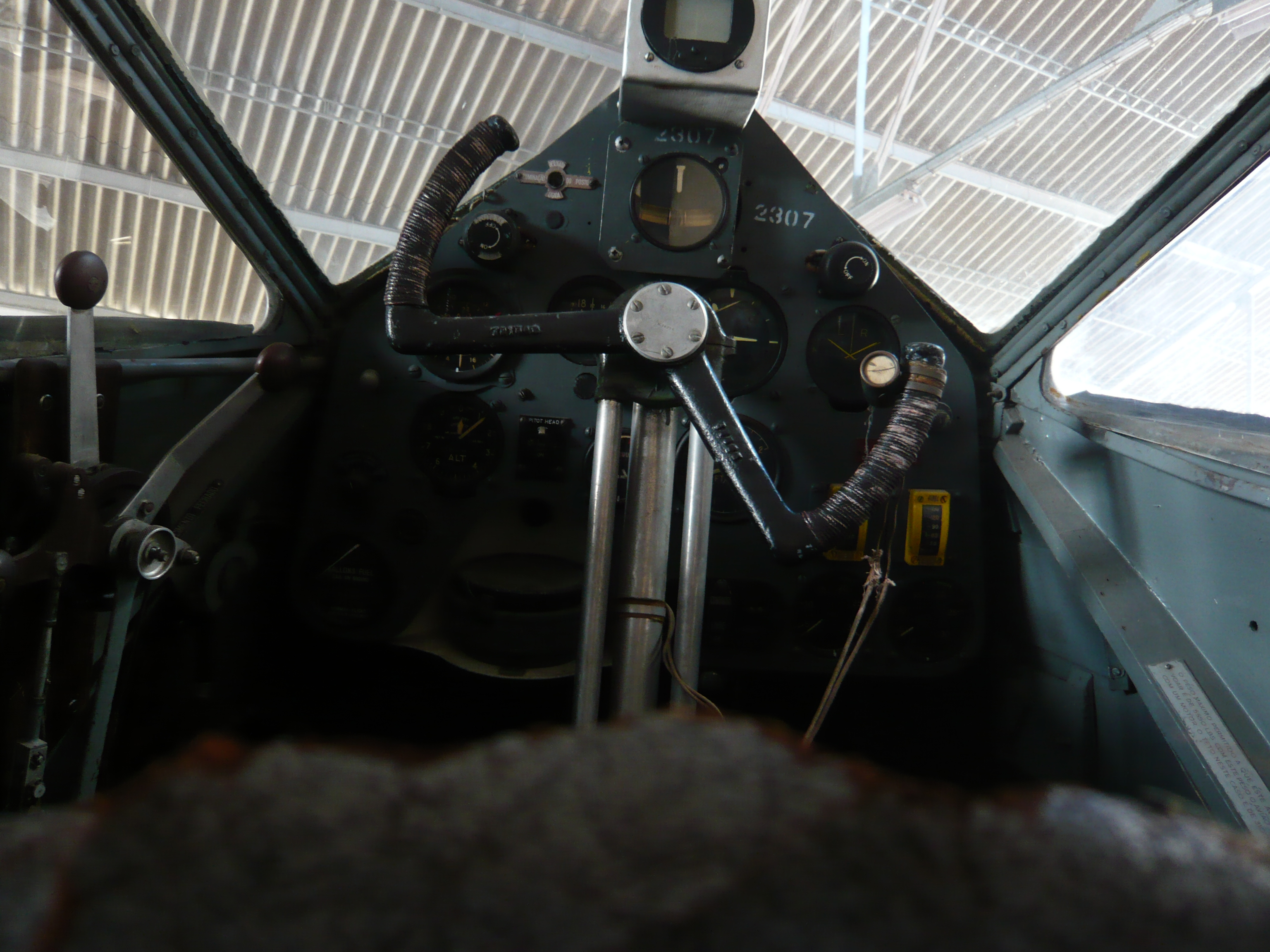
Flight deck

During summer 1933, the de Havilland aircraft company commenced work upon an aircraft to meet an Australian requirement, producing a four-engined faster passenger aircraft capable of seating ten passengers, the DH.86 Dragon Express. An important feature of the DH.86 was the newly developed and powerful Gipsy Six engine, a six-cylinder variant of the four cylinder Gipsy Major engine. The DH.86 would serve as the key starting point for the later DH.89.

During late 1933, a team at de Havilland, led by aircraft designer Arthur Ernest Hagg, began working on a new design, intended to be a faster and more comfortable successor to the earlier DH.84 Dragon. The new aircraft was, in effect, a twin-engined, scaled-down version of the four-engined DH.86 Express. It shared many common features with the earlier DH.86 Express, including its tapered wings, streamlined fairings and fuselage, as well as the same Gipsy Six engines. However, the DH.89 demonstrated none of the operational vices of the Express.

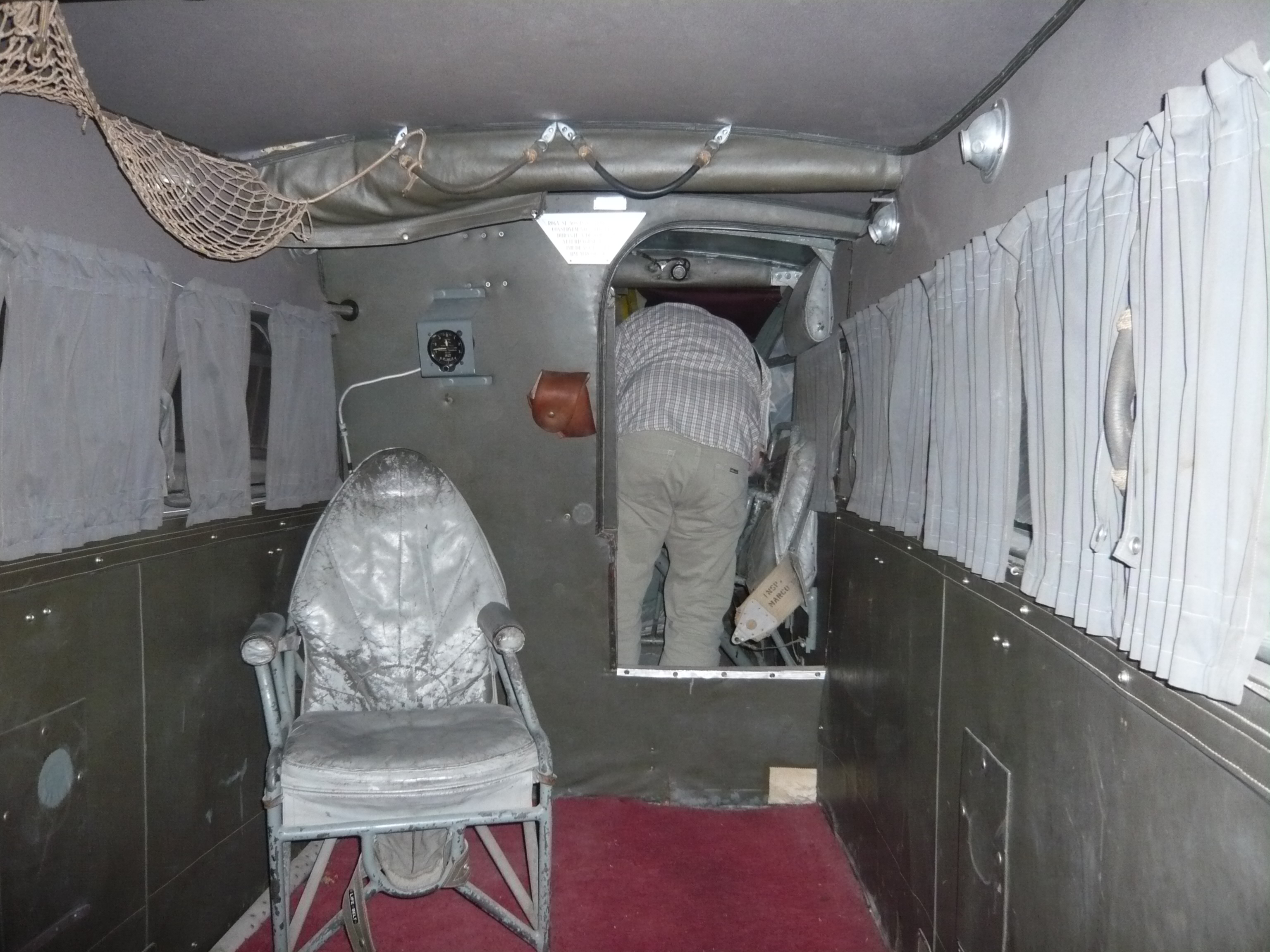
Cabin

On 17 April 1934, the prototype conducted its maiden flight at Hatfield Aerodrome, Hertfordshire. Flown by senior de Havilland test pilot H.S. Broad, it was powered by a pair of 200 horsepower (150 kW) Gypsy Six engines. Even prior to the prototype's first flight, plans to proceed with serial production of DH.89 had already received the go-ahead from management. During May 1934, airworthiness trials commenced at RAF Martlesham Heath using the prototype; during one such flight, upon attaining a speed of roughly 175 mph (282 km/h), the tip of the aircraft's nose buckled. In response to this event, a maximum permissible speed of 160 mph (260 km/h) was implemented for all DH89s. Upon the conclusion of trials, the prototype was sold.

By November 1934, series production of the Rapide had reached full swing. Originally referred to as the "Dragon Six", the aircraft was first marketed as the "Dragon Rapide", although the type later came to be popularly referred to as simply the "Rapide". Prior to the outbreak of the Second World War, 205 aircraft were manufactured for airlines and other private owners all around the world. The Rapide is perhaps the most successful British-built short-haul commercial passenger aircraft to be produced during the 1930s.

=== Further development ===
In response to the issuing of Specification G.18/35 by the British Air Ministry, de Havilland decided to design and produce a single prototype of a modified Rapide for undertaking coastal reconnaissance. Trials using the prototype, K4772, were performed between April and June 1935 at RAF Martlesham Heath and RAF Gosport. However, it ultimately lost out to its rival, the Avro Anson. K4772 was later used by the Royal Aircraft Establishment (RAE) in automatic landing trials before being broken down for spares. Work on a militarised version of the Rapide was not wasted as multiple sales were soon completed with other military customers, the first of which being to the Spanish government in December 1935.

Sensing demand for the type, de Havilland continued to modify the Rapide's design following its entry to service, creating both refinements and entirely new derivatives as a result. Aiming to produce a faster version of the Rapide, a smaller, lighter and externally cleaner version, designated as the DH.90 Dragonfly, emerged; first flying in August 1935, the DH.90 failed to achieve a similar rate of sales to the Rapide and production was terminated in 1938 after 67 aircraft had been completed. In November 1935, the 60th airframe to be produced, G-ADWZ, was modified and used by de Havilland as a trials aircraft. Fitted with elongated rear windows, cabin heating, thickened wing tips, and a strengthened airframe to allow for an elevated gross weight of 5,500 pounds (2,500 kg), G-ADWZ later participated in trials at Martlesham Heath, after which the higher gross weight was cleared for service.

In response to the announcement of an air race between Britain and Johannesburg, South Africa, de Havilland's design team produced a specialised variant of the Rapid, designated as the DH.92 Dolphin. This one-off derivative featured a retractable undercarriage, an expanded wingspan of 53 feet 7 inches (16.33 m), a modified nose section, and an increased all-up weight of 6,600 pounds (3,000 kg); however, flight tests in August 1936 revealed there to be no performance improvement over the standard Rapide, leading to the sole Dolphin being scrapped months later.

In November 1936, in response to suggestions that the addition of flaps would aid in landing, a single Rapide was modified in order to explore their functionality. Based on this performance, in February 1937, de Havilland announced that flaps would be fitted to all production aircraft from that year onwards, while other improvements such as a downwards-facing recognition light and metal propellers could be fitted as options. From 1937, to signify the fitting of improved trailing edge flaps, aircraft thus equipped were accordingly re-designated as DH.89A; earlier-built Rapides were commonly retrofitted to this standard during their service life as well.

== Operational history ==
=== Prewar operations ===
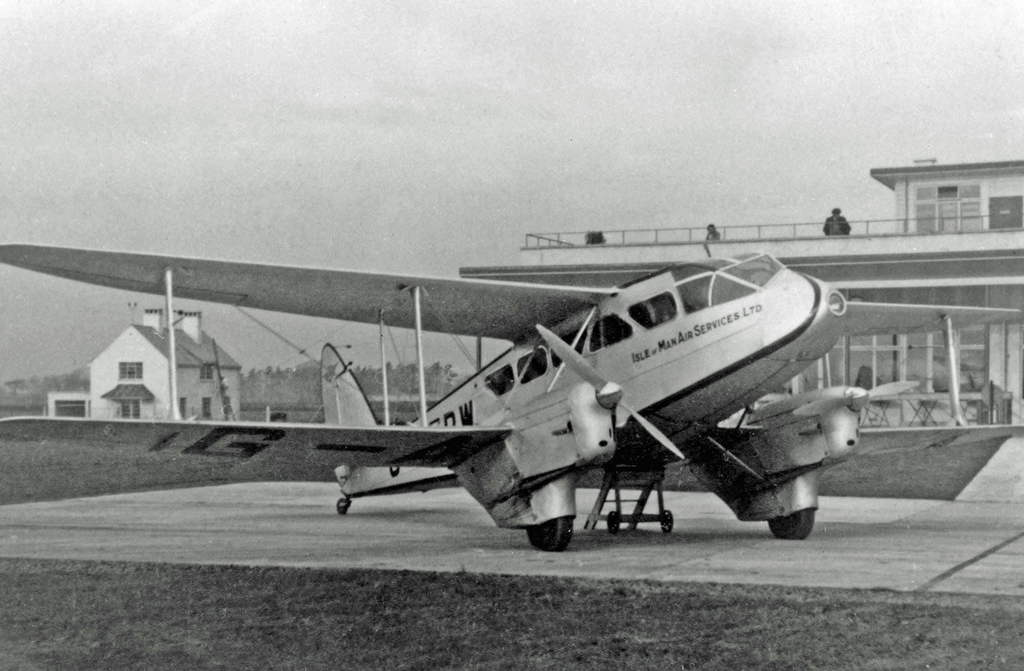
Dragon Rapide of Isle of Man Air Services on a scheduled service at Manchester (Ringway) Airport in 1938

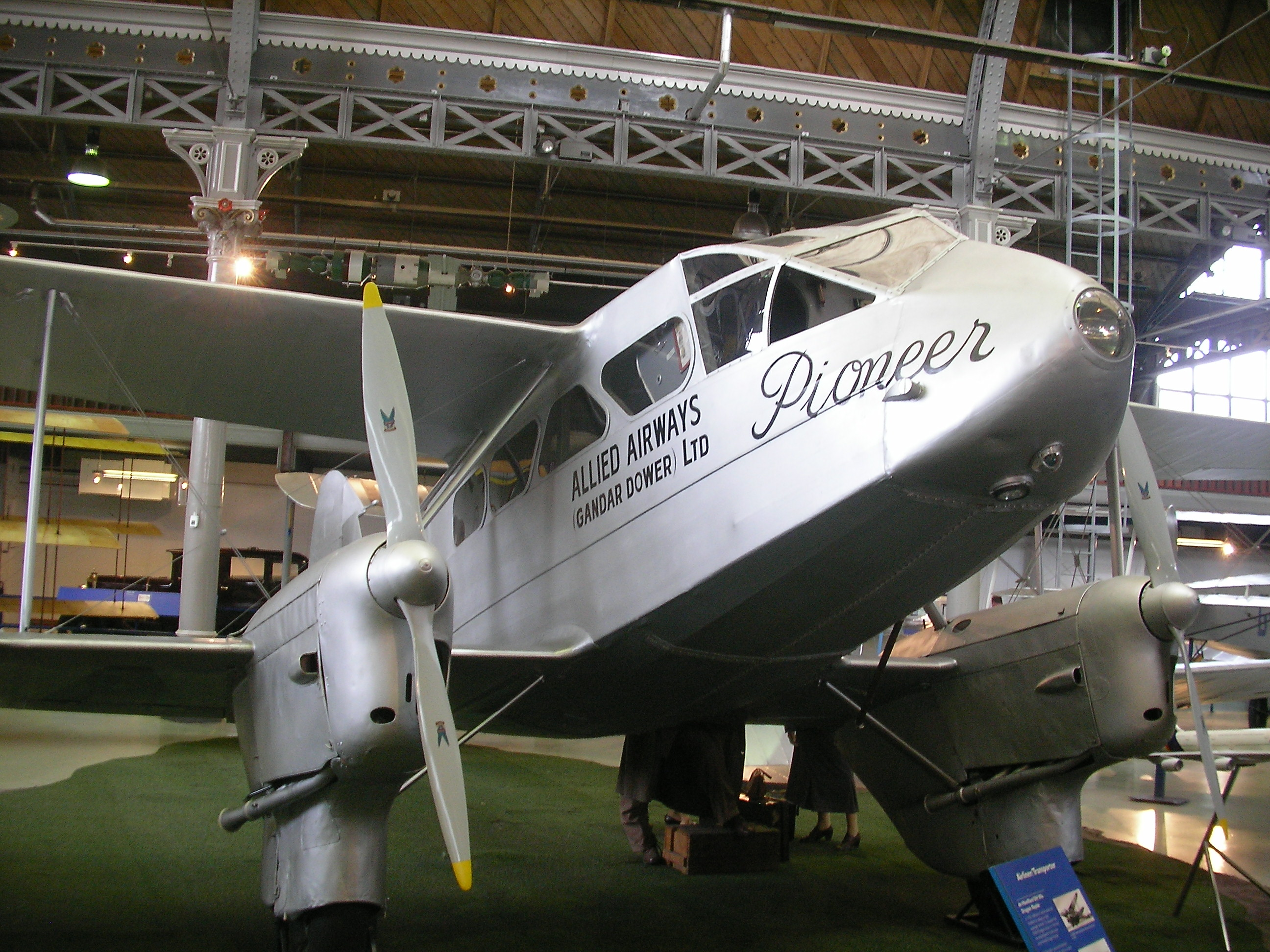
G-ADAH, built in 1935, and used by Hillmans Airways and Allied Airways until 1947. On display at the Science and Industry Museum, Manchester, England.

During July 1934, the first production Rapide, G-ACPM, performed the type's public debut at Hatfield with its entry into the 1934 King's Cup Race. While having achieved an average speed of 158 mph (254 km/h), G-ACPM had to be withdrawn from the race during Heat 9 of Round 2 when the wing sustained damage caused by hail while flying over Waddington, Lincolnshire. Another purpose-built Rapide, ZK'-ACO, was entered into the 1934 MacRobertson Air Race; fitted with three additional fuel tanks within the fuselage to extend the aircraft's range to 1,000 miles, the aircraft, flown by Squadron Leader J.D. Hewett and Mr C.E. Kay, took sixth place in the handicap race and fifth place in the speed race.

In the summer of 1934, the type entered service with UK-based airlines, with Hillman Airways Ltd being first to take delivery in July. The Anglo-Persian Oil Company was another early company to purchase the Rapide; used for quick communications purposes between individual oil fields spread out over vast distances, the aircraft quickly became popular in the oil industry, with the Iraq Petroleum Company and the Asiatic Petroleum Company also procuring their own Rapides.

From August 1934, Railway Air Services (RAS) operated a fleet of Dragon Rapides on routes linking London, the north of England and on to Northern Ireland and Scotland. The RAS DH.89s were named after places on the network, for example "Star of Lancashire". Isle of Man Air Services operated a fleet of Rapides on scheduled services from Ronaldsway Airport near Castletown to airports in north-west England including Blackpool, Liverpool and Manchester. Some of its aircraft had been transferred to it after operation by Railway Air Services.

During late 1935, the first of an initial batch of 16 Rapides were shipped to the manufacturer's Canadian branch, de Havilland Canada, for modification and re-sale purposes. Canadian aircraft received various changes, including an extended dorsal fin and a modified undercarriage arrangement, allowing for either wheels, skis, or floats to be interchangeably installed, dependent upon usage and weather conditions. The sole Canadian prototype, CF-AEO, was sold onto Quebec Airways in June 1935. Further Rapides were delivered to other customers in Canada, such as Canadian Airways, who used it on their West Coast and maritime routes.

On 30 January 1942, the majority of major Canadian operators were amalgamated into Canadian Pacific Air Lines, who continued to use the type. Further Canadian sales of the Rapide would occur both during and after the end of the Second World War.

During 1938, British operator Airwork Limited placed an initial order for nine Rapides to serve as navigation trainers. The order had been motivated by policy changes within the British Air Ministry, which sought to expand this capability. Repeat orders were placed by Airwork in the lead up to the Second World War, upon which point the firm's fleet of Rapides were all taken on by the Royal Air Force (RAF).

Edward, Prince of Wales (later Edward VIII), owned a single Dragon Rapide (G-ADDD), which he frequently used for carrying out his royal duties. He flew this aircraft to London on his accession as king in 1936, making him the first British monarch to fly.

In July 1936 a pair of British SIS agents, Cecil Bebb and Major Hugh Pollard, flew Francisco Franco in Rapide G-ACYR from the Canary Islands to Spanish Morocco, at the start of the military rebellion which began the Spanish Civil War. The aircraft involved has since been placed on public display in the Museo del Aire, Madrid, Spain.

=== Second World War ===
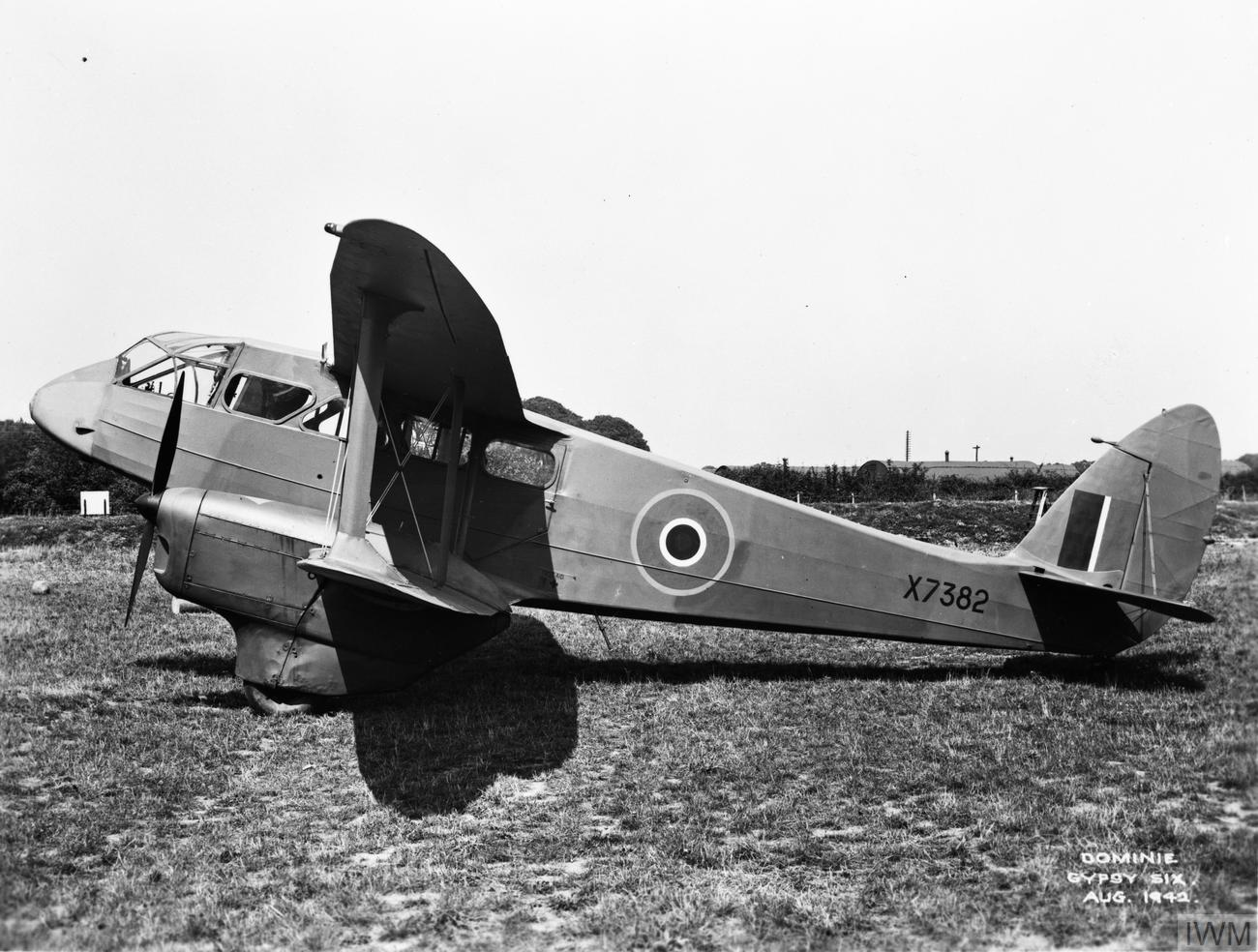
A Dominie of the Air Transport Auxiliary at Hatfield Aerodrome, August 1942

At the start of the Second World War on 3 September 1939, all British civil transport aircraft were requisitioned by the Ministry of Aircraft Production. A number of Dragon Rapides were used to provide internal flights under the control of National Air Communications (NAC). Perhaps one of the most significant early uses of the Rapide during the war occurred during the crucial weeks of May–June 1940 during the Battle of France, Rapides of 24 Squadron acted as aerial couriers between Britain and France; out of 24 aircraft, 10 Rapides were lost.

Following the closure of the NAC network, Dragon Rapides continued to fly for British airlines during the war as part of the Associated Airways Joint Committee (AAJC). Upon the outbreak of war, all civil services had been halted but some routes were returned to operation as and when they were deemed of value to the war effort or found to be in the national interest. The AAJC co-ordinated the majority of UK's wartime scheduled services, which were entirely operated on over-water routes. Other Dragon Rapides were pressed into service with the British armed forces as communications aircraft and training aircraft; Australian Rapides were also requisitioned by the Royal Australian Air Force (RAAF).

The final production Rapide was completed in November 1941, de Havilland instead produced the military Dominie variant. Over 500 Dominies were manufactured for military use, powered by improved Gipsy Queen engines; by the end of production in July 1946, 727 aircraft (Rapides and Dominies) had been manufactured. During the war, Dominie production was performed by de Havilland and Brush Coachworks Ltd, the latter being responsible for the greater proportion of the work. The Dominies were mainly used by the Royal Air Force (RAF) and Royal Navy for radio and navigation training. Other duties they were used for included passenger and communications missions.

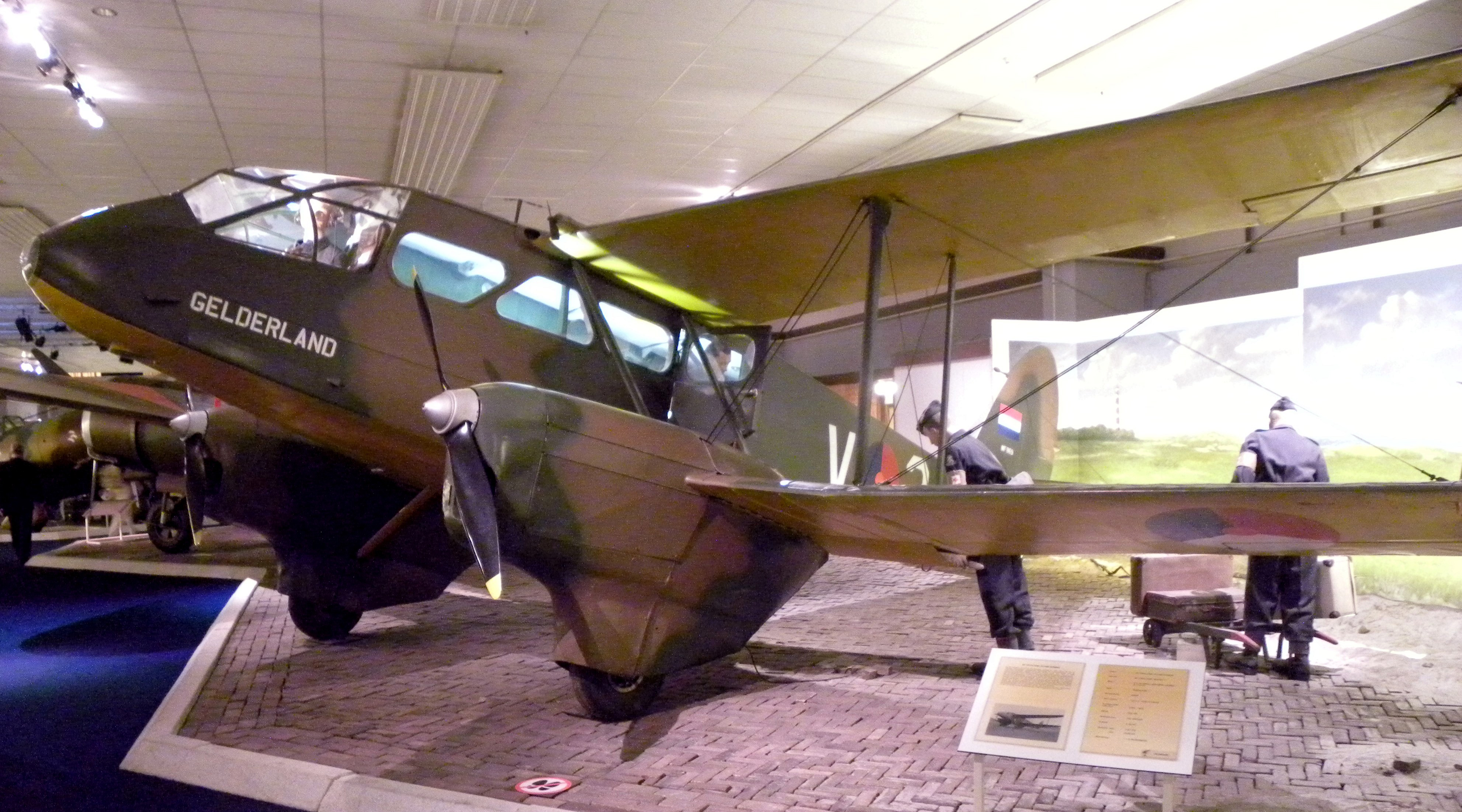
DH.89B Dominie Mark II in Royal Netherlands Air Force livery, Militaire Luchtvaart Museum, the Netherlands (2009)

During the war, civilian Rapides were replaced by Dominies as the type became available in greater quantities. Rapides were either dispatched to perform passenger operations or occasionally converted for other purposes, such as Air Ambulances; by the end of the conflict, only nine requisitioned Rapides were restored to their civilian registrations. These were joined by many Dominies which had been deemed to be surplus to requirements.

=== Postwar operations ===
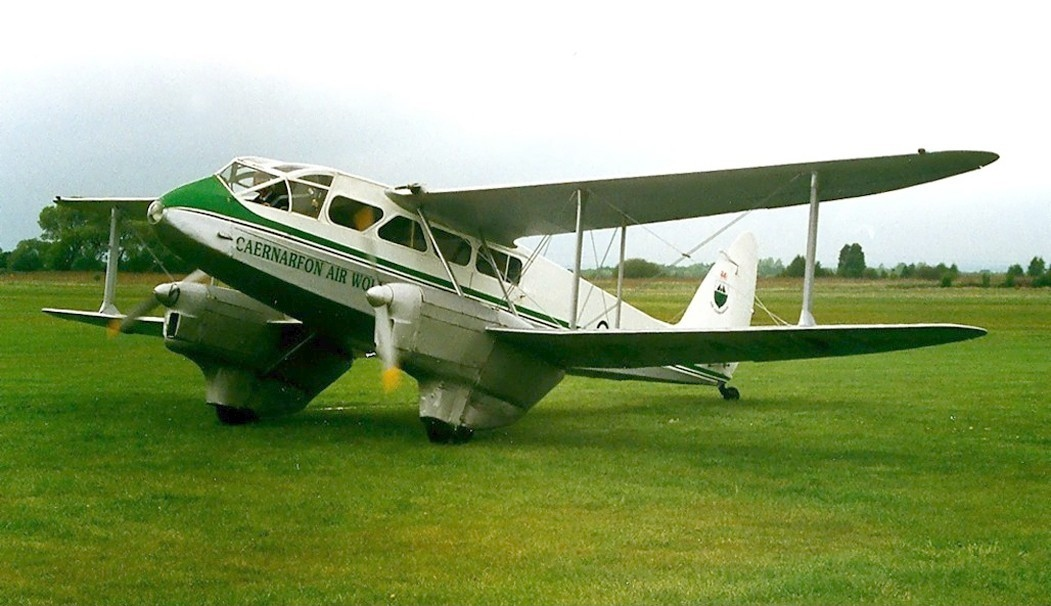
A former RAF Dominie G-AIDL was flown by Allied Airways in the late 1940s, Fox's Confectionery 1950–59, the Army Parachute Association 1967–77 and Air Atlantique Classic Flight 1995–2009.

Postwar, the Dominie continued to be used for some time by Royal Naval air station flights as communications aircraft. By 1960, the Royal Navy still had a fleet of 14 Dominies, although under normal circumstances only three were in use and the others were stored at RAF Lossiemouth, Moray, Scotland. The last of the Navy Dominies had been phased out of service during 1963; thirteen aircraft were subsequently sold on via public tender, a number of which having been converted to civil Rapide configurations.

Many ex-RAF survivors had quickly entered commercial service after the war according to aviation author Peter W. Moss, a typical Dominie-to-Rapide conversion performed by de Havilland involved the repainting of the exterior (replacing the wartime camouflage scheme) and the installation of sound proofing, upholstered seats and a new décor within the cabin area. Third party companies performed conversion schemes, including Field Aircraft Services, Airwork Limited, Air Enterprises, W.A. Rollason Limited and the Lancashire Aircraft Corporation (LAC). By 1958, 81 examples were recorded as still flying on the British register.

In the Netherlands, airline KLM, keen to restart operations, set about procuring a handful of Rapides prior to the end of the war, commencing the first of its re-launched services during September 1945. Various British airlines also became prolific users of the type; British European Airways (BEA), formed on 1 January 1946, took over 39 Rapides during February 1947. BEA used many across its fledgling network, later focusing upon services within the Scottish, Scilly, and Channel Islands while gradually selling on displaced and excess aircraft via Airwork. Small independent British airlines that chose to resist pressure from the British government to merge into BEA also commonly operated the Rapide.

Better to distinguish different standards of Rapides available after the war, de Havilland established a basic mark number system. Mk 1 aircraft were those constructed pre-war, while Mk 2 and Mk 3 Rapides were ex-military conversions to a six-passenger cabin and eight-passenger cabin respectively. Those Rapides that were re-engined with a pair of de Havilland Gipsy Queen engines, were referred to as Mk 4s. These had an improved climb, cruise speed and single engine performance but an increased all-up weight of 6,000 lb (2,700 kg).

By 1966, use of the Rapide had gone into decline and several large operators had stopped using the type. Due to the declining stocks of spares, Rapides were broken up to scavenge parts to maintain other active aircraft. Demand for such an aircraft was still relatively strong, according to Moss.

The DH.89 proved an economical and durable aircraft, despite its relatively primitive plywood construction and many were still flying in the early 2000s. Several Dragon Rapides are operational in the UK, while operators including Classic Wings and Plane Heritage, offer pleasure flights in them to the general public. Shortly after the end of the Second World War, de Havilland introduced a Dragon Rapide replacement, the de Havilland Dove.

== Variants ==
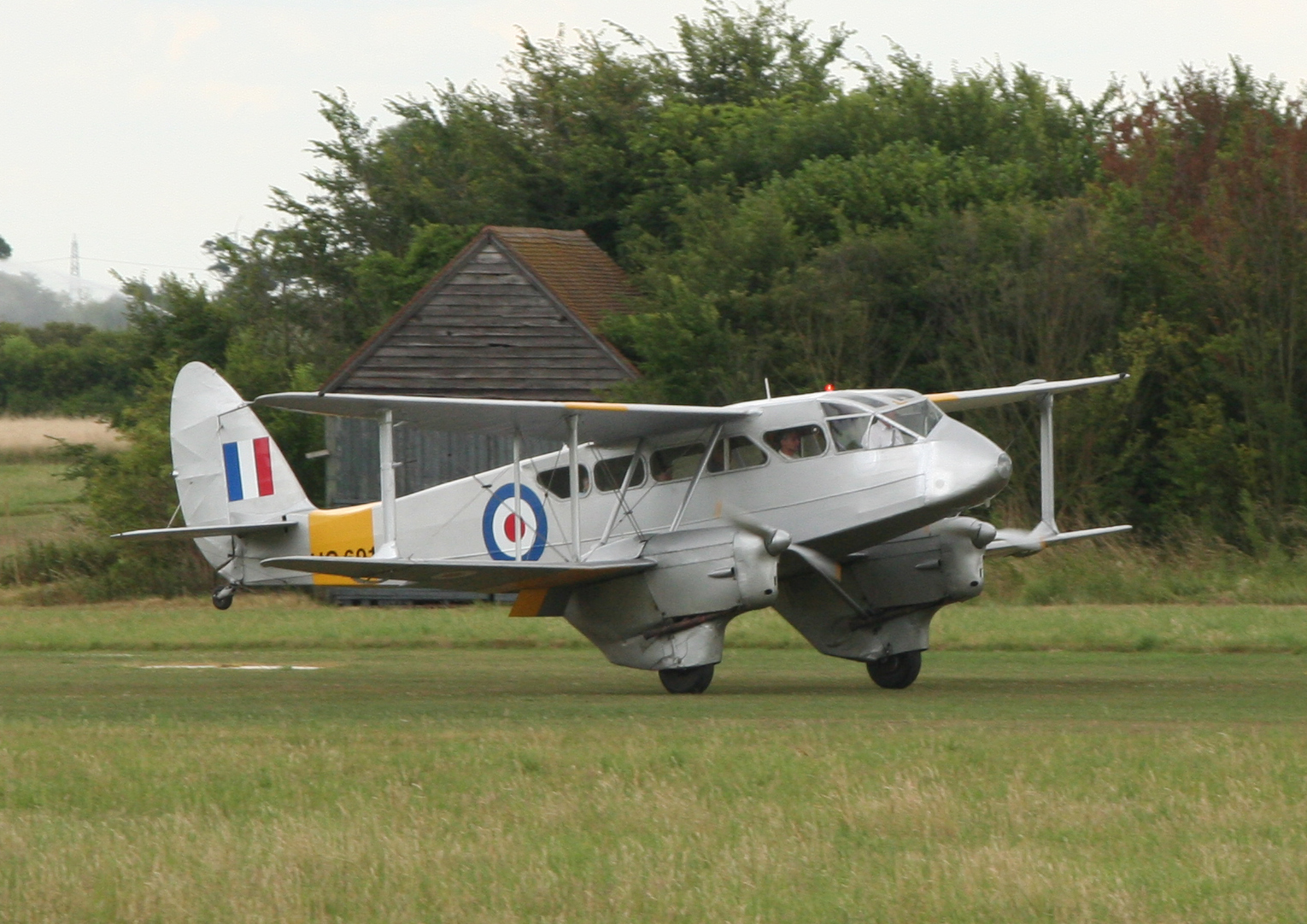
Dragon Rapide G-AIYR at Old Warden airfield

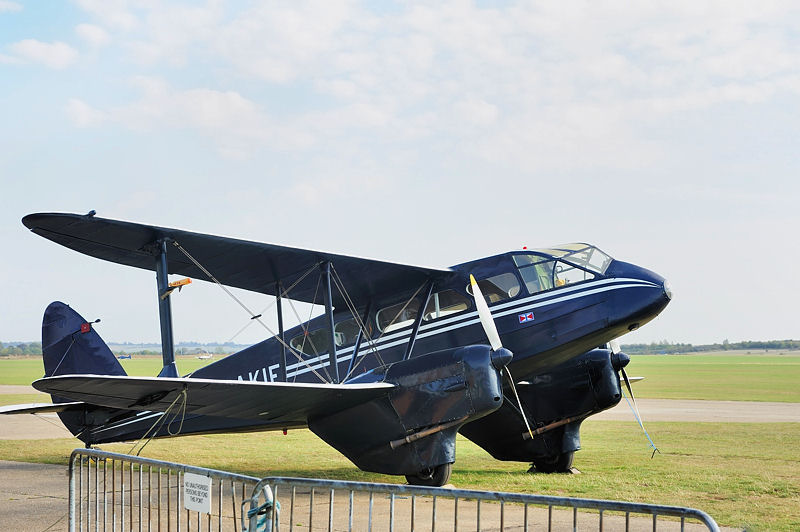
Dragon Rapide in flying condition, at Duxford aerodrome

D.H.89
Twin-engined light transport biplane. First production version.
D.H.89A
Improved version, fitted with a landing light in the nose, modified wing tips and cabin heating.
D.H.89A Series 4
D.H.89A aircraft converted to two de Havilland Gipsy Queen 2 piston engines, fitted with constant speed propellers.
D.H.89A Mk 5
One D.H.89A aircraft, powered by two de Havilland Gipsy Queen 3 piston engines.
D.H.89A Mk 6
One D.H.89A aircraft fitted with Fairey X5 fixed-pitch propellers.
D.H.89M
Military transport version. Exported to Lithuania and Spain.
D.H.89B Dominie Mk I
Radio and navigation training version.
D.H.89B Dominie Mk II
Communications and transport version.

== Operators ==
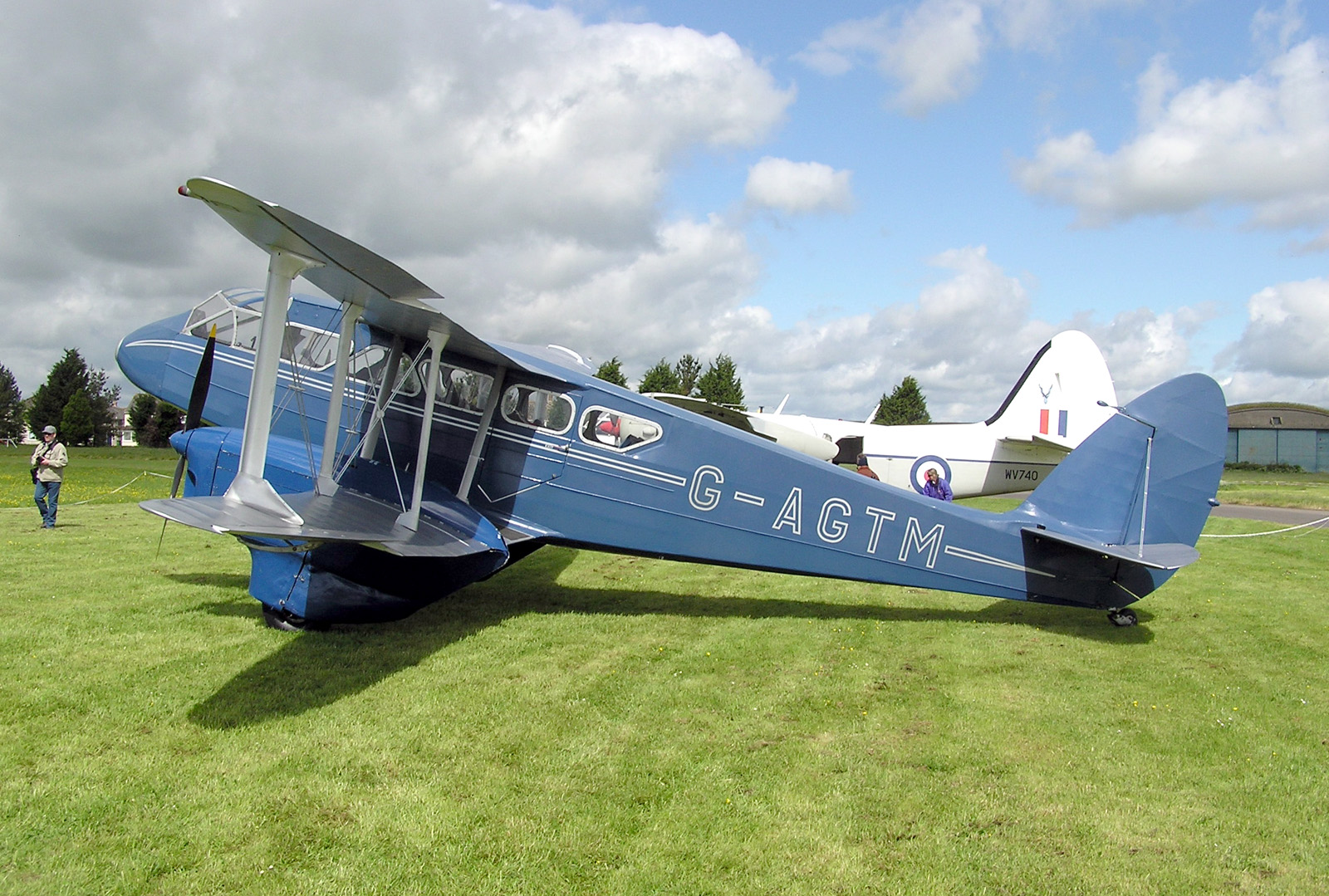
1944 de Havilland DH89a Dragon Rapide 6

=== Civil ===
Argentina

- Zonas Oeste y Norte de Aerolíneas Argentinas (Z.O.N.D.A.)

Australia

- Adelaide Airways
- Australian National Airways
- Royal Flying Doctor Service
- Qantas Empire Airways

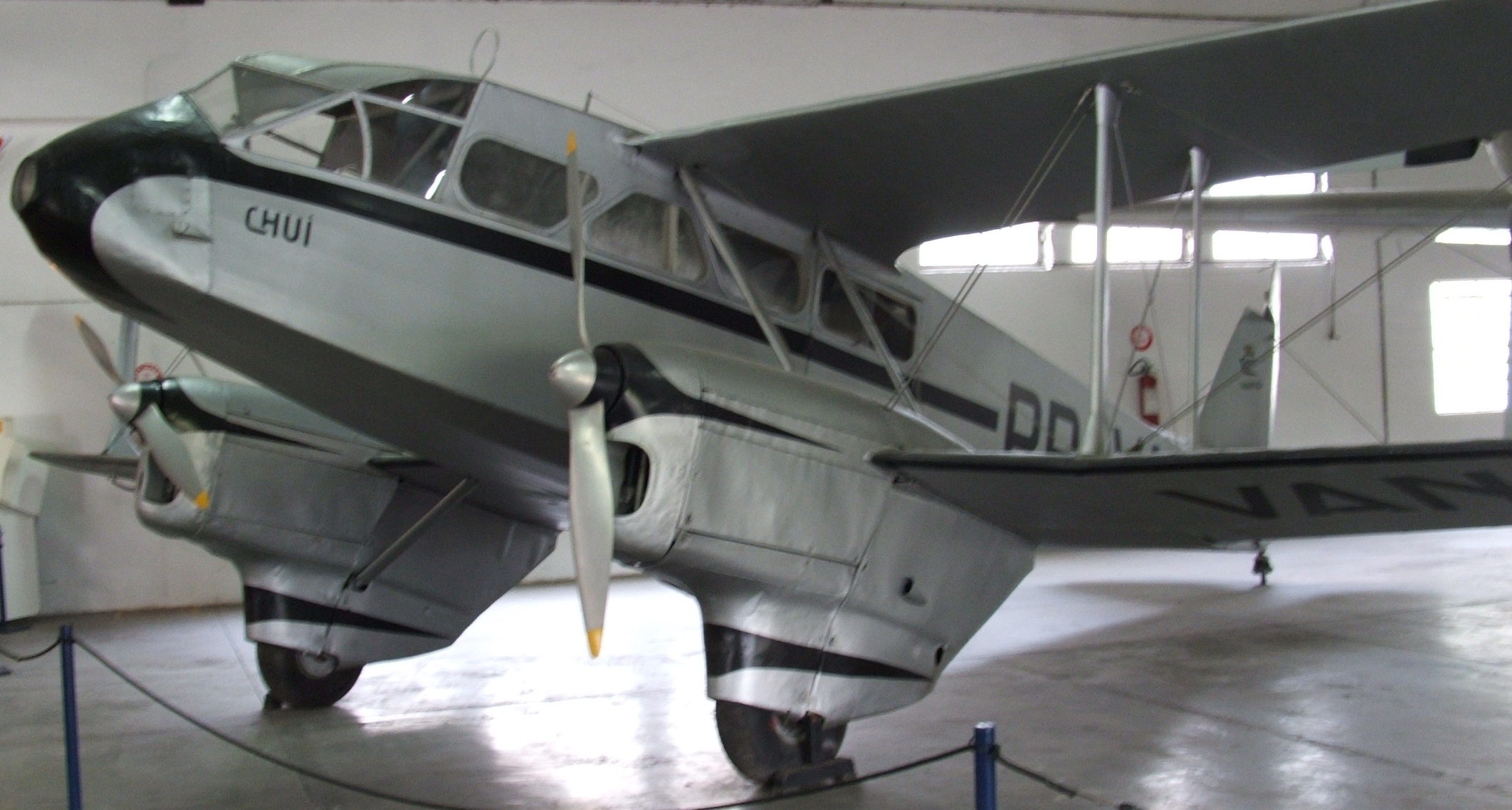
Dragon Rapide of VARIG preserved at Rio de Janeiro

Brazil

- Arco-Íris
- OMTA
- Varig

Crown Colony of North Borneo
Crown Colony of Sarawak
Protectorate of Brunei

- Borneo Airways

Canada

- Canadian Airways
- Canadian Pacific
- Quebec Airways

Republic of China

- China National Aviation Corporation (CNAC)

Dutch East Indies

- KNILM

Egypt

- Misr Airlines

Finland

- Aero Oy operated two aircraft.

France

- Air France

French Indochina

- Société Aigle Azur Indochine
- Cie de Transports Aérien Autrex
- Compagnie Laotienne de Commerce et de Transport

Iceland

- Air Iceland

India

- Air India
- Indian National Airways
- Tata Airlines

Indonesia

- Government of Indonesia

Iran

- Iranian State Airlines

Iraq

- Iraqi Airways

Ireland

- Aer Lingus
- Aer Turas operated one aircraft.

Kenya, Uganda, Tanganyika and Zanzibar

- East African Airways
- Wilson Airways

Latvia

- Valsts Gaisa satiksme - 2

Lebanon

- Middle East Airlines

Netherlands

- KLM

New Zealand

- Air Travel (NZ) Ltd
- Mount Cook Airline
- National Airways Corporation
- Cook Strait Airways Ltd
- Union Airways of New Zealand
- West Coast Airways

Palestine

- Palestine Airways (British Mandate of Palestine)
- Aviron

Paraguay

- Aerocarga Asociados ACA

Portuguese Timor

- Transportes Aéreos de Timor

Romania

- LARES

South Africa

- Comair (South Africa) operated 2 aircraft.

Spanish Republic

- Spanish Republican Air Force

Spanish State

- Iberia

Switzerland

- Swissair

United Kingdom

- Aberdeen Airways
- Air Charter Limited
- Air Atlantique Classic Flight now the Classic Air Force
- Airviews Ltd
- Air Enterprises
- Air Kruise
- Allied Airways
- Automobile Association
- Blackpool and West Coast Air Services
- British Airways Ltd
- British American Air Services
- British Continental Airways
- British European Airways
- British Westpoint
- Classic Wings
- Crilly Airways Ltd
- East Anglian Flying Services
- Gibraltar Airways
- Great Western and Southern Airlines
- Hillmans Airways
- Highland Airways Limited
- Hunting Air Travel
- Island Air Services
- Isle of Man Air Services
- Jersey Airways
- Lancashire Aircraft Corporation
- Mayflower Air Services
- Melba Airways
- Morton Air Services
- North Eastern Airways
- Northern & Scottish Airways
- Northwest Airlines (UK)
- Olley Air Services
- Personal Airways
- Railway Air Services
- Scillonia Airways
- Scottish Airways
- Sivewright Airways
- Southampton Air Services
- Southern Airlines
- Starways
- Trans European Aviation
- United Airways
- Western Airways
- Westward Airways (Lands End)
- Yellow Air Taxis

Soviet Union

- Aeroflot

Yugoslavia

- Aeroput

=== Military operators ===
Australia

- Royal Australian Air Force

Belgium

- Belgian Air Force (Seven operated from 1946)

Canada

- Royal Canadian Air Force
  - No. 418 Squadron RCAF

Egypt

- Royal Egyptian Air Force

Finland

- Finnish Air Force

Nazi Germany

- Luftwaffe operated captured aircraft.

India

- Royal Indian Air Force

Iran

- Imperial Iranian Air Force

Israel

- Israeli Air Force

Jordan

- Royal Jordanian Air Force

Lithuania

- Lithuanian Air Force operated two D.H.89M aircraft.

Netherlands

- Royal Netherlands Air Force – four D.H.89B Mark II (transports)
  - No. 334 Squadron RNLAF (1944–1956)

New Zealand

- Royal New Zealand Air Force
  - No. 4 Squadron RNZAF
  - No. 42 Squadron RNZAF

Peru

- Peruvian Air Force

Portugal

- Portuguese Air Force

Southern Rhodesia

- Southern Rhodesian Air Force – Four aircraft.

South Africa

- South African Air Force

Soviet Union

- Soviet Air Force used at least two DH.89, captured from Lithuanian Air Force during the occupation of the Baltics

Spain

- Spanish Republican Air Force operated three D.H.89M requisitioned from LAPE

Spain

- Spanish Air Force

Turkey

- Turkish Air Force - three DH.89As.

United Kingdom

- Royal Air Force
  - No. 24 Squadron RAF
  - No. 173 Squadron RAF
  - No. 225 Squadron RAF
  - No. 271 Squadron RAF
  - No. 510 Squadron RAF
  - No. 526 Squadron RAF
  - No. 527 Squadron RAF
  - No. 614 Squadron RAF
- Fleet Air Arm
  - 700 Naval Air Squadron
  - 701 Naval Air Squadron
  - 703 Naval Air Squadron
  - 736 Naval Air Squadron
  - 739 Naval Air Squadron
  - 740 Naval Air Squadron
  - 744 Naval Air Squadron
  - 767 Naval Air Squadron
  - 776 Naval Air Squadron
  - 778 Naval Air Squadron
  - 781 Naval Air Squadron
  - 782 Naval Air Squadron
  - 787 Naval Air Squadron
  - 790 Naval Air Squadron
  - 799 Naval Air Squadron
  - 1832 Naval Air Squadron
  - 1844 Naval Air Squadron

United States

- United States Army Air Forces

Uruguay

- Uruguayan Air Force

Kingdom of Yugoslavia

- Royal Yugoslav Air Force – One aircraft pressed into military service in 1940.

== Accidents and incidents ==
- 2 October 1934, G-ACPM of Hillman's Airways crashed into the sea off Folkestone, Kent causing the death of the pilot and the six passengers.
- 30 December 1936, G-AEGS of the Iraqi Petroleum Petrol Transport Company overturned in a forced landing in Palestine, two killed.
- 21 August 1937, CF-BBG Registered 10.6.37 to The Globe and Mail Ltd, Toronto. Named "The Flying Newsroom" and equipped with floats. Destroyed by fire whilst refuelling Toronto Air Harbour, Toronto, Ontario 21.8.37. Registration cancelled 21.8.37 (same day)
- 3 July 1938, G-AEBX Star of Scotia of Railway Air Services crashed at Sydenham, Northern Ireland, two killed.
- 20 June 1939, G-AERE operated by British American Air Services crashed in County Durham, England. John Crouch who was the king's jockey, the pilot and the wireless operator were all killed.
- 27 May 1941, R5929 a Dominie of the Royal Air Force near Devizes, Wiltshire, England, seven killed.
- 7 July 1941, R9563 a Dominie of the Royal Navy crashed in bad weather three miles North of Stonehaven, Aberdeenshire, Scotland, six killed.
- 14 February 1942, R5927 a Dominie of the Royal Air Force hit a balloon cable and crashed near Colnbrook, Wiltshire, England, six killed.
- 29 May 1942, VH-UXZ of Australian National Airways crashed near Flinders Island, Bass Strait, Australia following engine failure (probably through running out of fuel), four killed.
- 20 July 1944, VH-UBN owned by the Australian Department of Civil Aviation, but leased to Guinea Airways, crashed at Mount Kitchener, South Australia, probably as the result of pilot disorientation in cloud, killing all seven on board.
- 6 February 1945, SU-ABP of Misr Airwork crashed in Egypt, seven killed.
- 1 April 1946, G-AERZ of Railway Air Services crashed in County Down, Northern Ireland, six killed.
- 30 August 1946, X7394 a Dominie of the Royal Navy crashed at Scafell Pike, Cumberland, England in bad weather during an ambulance flight, five killed.
- 15 April 1947, G-AHKR of British European Airways crashed into Slieau Ruy whilst operating a scheduled passenger flight from Speke Airport, Liverpool, Lancashire to Ronaldsway Airport, Isle of Man. There were only minor injuries amongst the six people on board.
- 10 June 1948, G-AIUI of Hargreaves Airways crashed at Cronk ny Arrey Laa, Isle of Man. Seven of the nine people on board were killed. The aircraft was operating a scheduled passenger flight from Speke to Ronaldsway.
- 11 November 1948, G-AKOF of Mannin Airways flying from Dublin, Ireland and unable to land at Ronaldsway diverted to Speke but ran out of fuel and crashed in River Mersey off Liverpool, England, eight killed.
- 10 July 1951, G-ALXJ of the Air Navigation and Trading Company crashed into the Irish Sea off Laxey, Isle of Man, killing the pilot. The aircraft was operating a scheduled cargo flight from Squires Gate Airport, Blackpool, Lancashire to RAF Jurby instead of its normal destination of Ronaldsway Airport, which was fogbound.
- 14 September 1952, G-AIZI crashed shortly after takeoff from Croydon Airport at Wallington, Surrey following a loss of power from the starboard engine. The pilot, the only person on board, was killed.
- 30 August 1953, VP-RCP, registered to the Northern Rhodesian Government, Department of Civil Aviation (Lusaka), crash-landed near the Munyamadzi River, at a village named Lambwe in Chief Nawalya’s area, Mpika District (then Northern Rhodesia), close to the Rhodesia/Nyasaland border and roughly 100 miles from Lundazi. Four occupants were injured (including fractures to the pilot); all reached Lundazi Boma by 2 September 1953 after a bush rescue.
- 19 February 1954, G-AFMF crashed at Simonburn Common near Hexham, Northumberland. The pilot and seven passengers escaped with minor injuries.
- 29 June 1957, G-AGUE of Island Air Services crashed on takeoff from Ramsgate Airport, Kent on a local pleasure flight. The aircraft was written off, but all on board escaped uninjured.
- 16 July 1960, OY-DZY of Zonens Redningskorps crashed shortly after takeoff from Copenhagen Airport, Denmark. The aircraft was chartered by the Danish Football Union to transport soccer players to a test match in Jutland. All eight passengers were killed; the pilot survived but had one leg amputated.
- 11 August 2018, N683DH crashed shortly after takeoff from Abbotsford International Airport at the Abbotsford International Airshow.

== Surviving aircraft ==
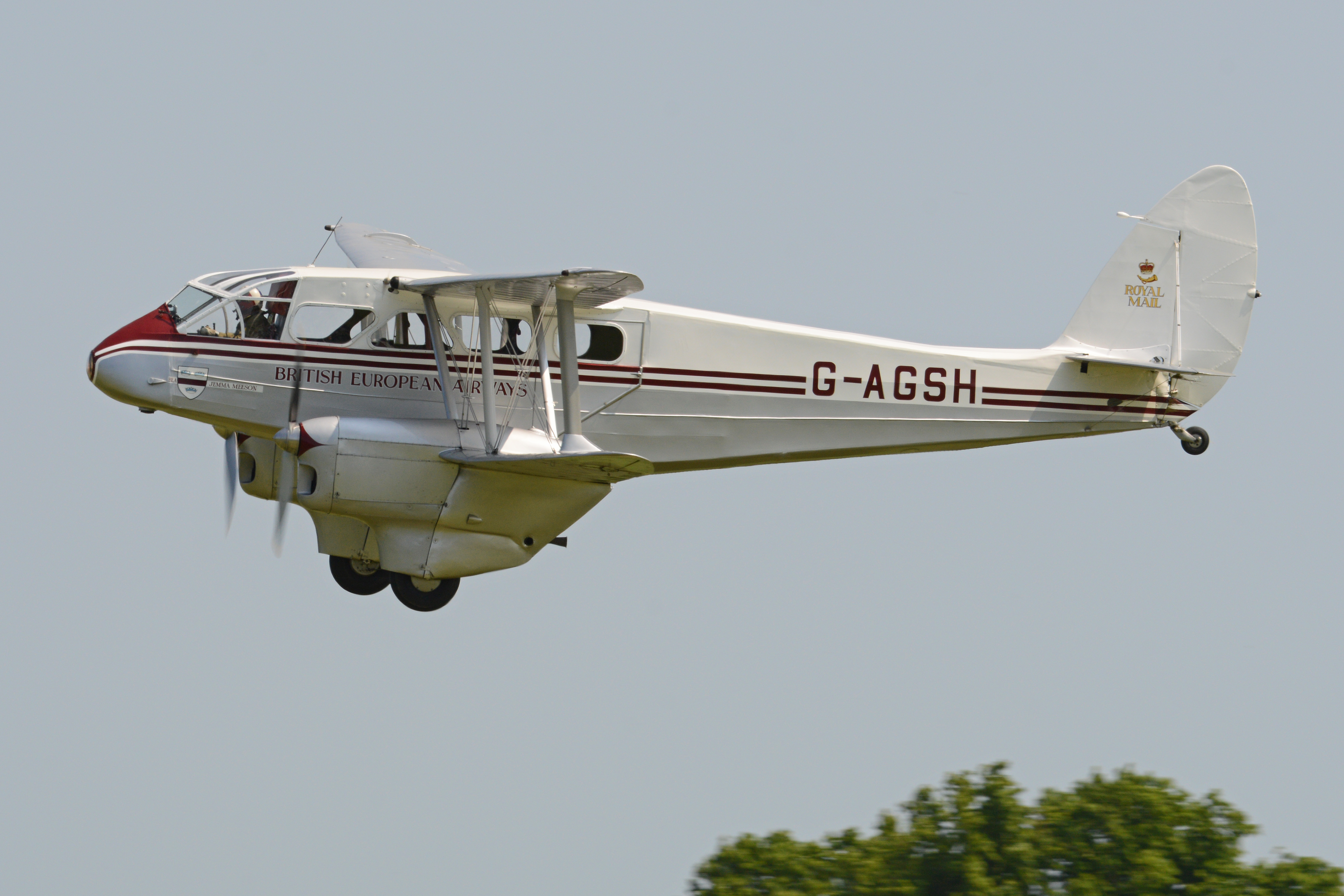
Dragon Rapide G-AGSH at Old Warden airfield

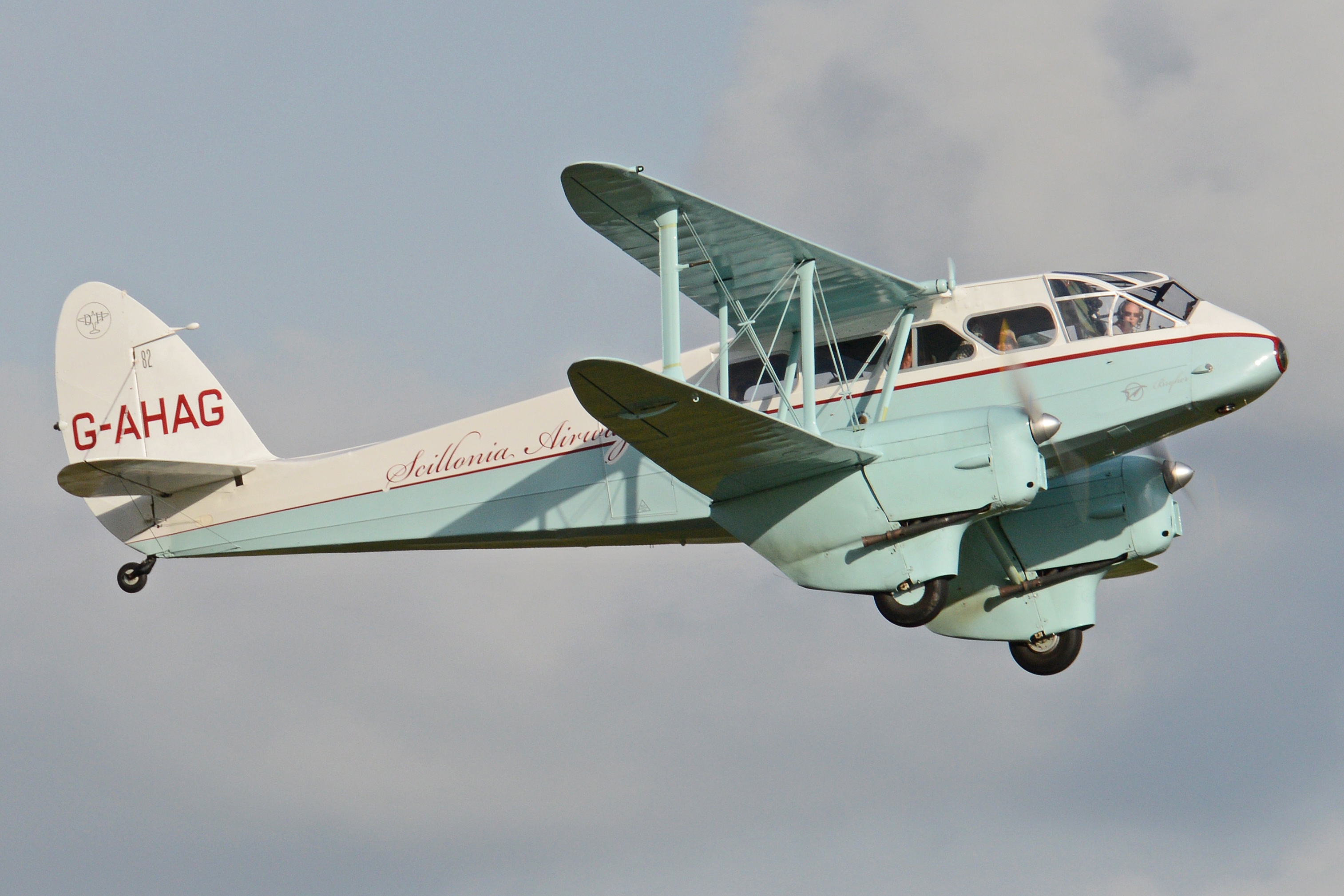
Dragon Rapide G-AHAG at Duxford Aerodrome

- F-AZCA is preserved in France (Amicale Jean Baptiste Salis at La Ferté Alais) Used for a double transatlantic flight in the late 1980s as an advertising vehicle for Blueway cigarettes. It is scheduled for restoration.
- G-ACPP, on display at the Reynolds-Alberta Museum Fame in Wetaskiwin Alberta. The fifth D.H.89 built, and started its career with Railway Air Services Ltd of Croydon, UK on 2 Feb. 1935 with the name 'City of Bristol'. It is the oldest surviving D.H.89.
- G-ACYR, in Olley Air Service Livery, used to fly Franco from the Canary Islands in the first days of the Spanish Civil War, based at Museo del Aire (Madrid).
- G-ADAH, a DH89A in the livery of Allied Airways, is on display at the Museum of Science and Industry in Manchester, England.
- G-ADDD (was G-ACZE, N1934D), a DH89A currently undergoing restoration to flying condition at the Military Aviation Museum in Virginia Beach, Virginia.
- G-AEML / EC-AAY, a DH89A in the livery of Iberia, is airworthy and operated by the Fundación Infante de Orleans in Spain.
- G-AGJG, a DH89A, in the colours of Scottish Airways, is airworthy and in the hands of private owners at Duxford Airfield, Cambridge, England.
- G-AGSH, a DH89A, is airworthy with the Shuttleworth Collection in Old Warden, Bedfordshire. Was rebuilt and restored to her BEA colours by Cliff Lovell at Hants Light Plane Services.
- G-AGTM, a DH89A, is airworthy and was operated by the Classic Air Force before it closed in 2016.
- G-AHAG, a DH89A in the livery of Scillonia Airways, is airworthy and based at Membury airfield, Berkshire.
- G-AHXW, is under repair following its 2018 crash. Upon completion of will rejoin the Historic Flight Foundation Spokane, Washington.
- G-AIDL, a Mk 6, is airworthy and owned by Cirrus Aviation, painted as a Royal Air Force Dominie TX310, its former identity.
- G-AKIF and G-AIYR, a pair of DH89A Dragon Rapides, are airworthy and based at Duxford, England airfield for tourist flights.
- G-AKNV (last registration was OO-CNP), on display at the Royal Museum of the Armed Forces and Military History in Brussels.
- 6662 / N663HG, a DH89B, is airworthy and based at Hillsboro, Oregon.
- NR695 / N2290F, a DH89A, is on display at the National Museum of the United States Air Force, Dayton, Ohio.
- TC-ERK, a DH89A, is on display at the Istanbul Aviation Museum.
- TF-ISM, a D.H.89A that was one of 3 in service in Iceland. 2 of which were in service with Icelandair
- ZS-JGV NR743(CN6831), a DH89A is airworthy and is based in Queenstown in the Eastern Cape, South Africa.
- C-FAYE, known as Lady Faye, is on display at the Canadian Bushplane Heritage Centre in Sault Ste. Marie, Ontario.
- V-3, DH89B (CN6740), on display at the Nationaal Militair Museum, The Netherlands
- 2304, DH89A (CN6430), operated by Força Aérea Portuguesa on display at the Museu do Ar, Sintra Portugal
- VQ-PAR / 002 / CN6952, a DH89A on display at the Israeli Air Force Museum, Israel, Hatzerim Airbase
- PP-VAN, an ex-Varig DH89A on display at the Museu Aeroespacial in Rio de Janeiro, Brazil

== Specifications (Dragon Rapide) ==

Data from Jane's All the World's Aircraft 1938

General characteristics

- Crew: 1
- Capacity: 8 passengers
- Length: 34 ft 6 in (10.52 m)
- Wingspan: 48 ft 0 in (14.63 m)
- Height: 10 ft 3 in (3.12 m)
- Wing area: 336 sq ft (31.2 m^{2})
- Aspect ratio: 11.7
- Airfoil: RAF 34 modified
- Empty weight: 3,230 lb (1,465 kg)
- Gross weight: 5,500 lb (2,495 kg)
- Fuel capacity: 76 imp gal (91 US gal; 346 L) fuel in two wing tanks behind each engine; 3.5 imp gal (4 US gal; 16 L) air-cooled oil tank
- Cabin dimensions (average):

- Cabin length: 13 ft 6 in (4.1 m)
- Cabin height: 4 ft 6 in (1.4 m)
- Cabin width: 4 ft 0 in (1.2 m)

- Powerplant: 2 × de Havilland Gipsy Six 6-cylinder air-cooled inverted in-line piston engines, 200 hp (150 kW) each
- Propellers: 2-bladed fixed-pitch propellers

Performance

- Maximum speed: 157 mph (253 km/h, 136 kn) at 1,000 ft (305 m)

155 mph (135 kn; 249 km/h) at sea level

- Cruise speed: 132 mph (212 km/h, 115 kn)
- Range: 556 mi (895 km, 483 nmi) in still-air at cruising speed
- Service ceiling: 16,700 ft (5,100 m)

3,100 ft (945 m) on one engine with full payload

- Rate of climb: 867 ft/min (4.40 m/s)
- Time to altitude: 5,000 ft (1,524 m) in 6 minutes 45 seconds
- Wing loading: 16 lb/sq ft (78 kg/m^{2})
- Power/mass: 0.073 hp/lb (0.120 kW/kg)
- Take-off run: 870 ft (265 m)
- Landing run: 510 ft (155 m)

== Notable appearances in media ==
A 1986 Spanish film, Dragon Rapide, covers its historical use by Generalissimo Francisco Franco during the preparation for the Spanish Civil War.

In a film adaptation of Agatha Christie's Peril at End House (1990), the film starts with a De Havilland DH.89A Dragon Rapide, (registration G-ACZE).

== See also ==
Related development

- de Havilland Dragon
- de Havilland Express
- Breda Ba.44

Related lists

- List of aircraft of the Royal Air Force
- List of aircraft of the Spanish Republican Air Force
