= The English Review =

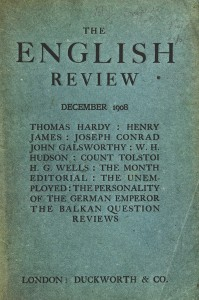
- The English Review
- Categories: Literary magazine
- Frequency: Monthly
- First issue: 1908
- Final issue: 1937
- Country: Great Britain
- Based in: London
- Language: English

The English Review was an English-language literary magazine published in London from 1908 to 1937. At its peak, the journal published some of the leading writers of its day.

== History ==
The magazine was started by 1908 by Ford Madox Hueffer (later Ford Madox Ford) "in a rage that there was no place in England to print a poem by Thomas Hardy" and as a venue for some of the best writers available. Published in December 1908, the first issue contained original work by Thomas Hardy, Henry James, Joseph Conrad, John Galsworthy, W. H. Hudson, R. B. Cunninghame Graham and H. G. Wells. Hueffer maintained this level of quality in subsequent issues he edited, publishing the early work of Ezra Pound, D. H. Lawrence and Wyndham Lewis. Yet despite its literary excellence, the new venture was not a financial success. Issued as a monthly magazine of approximately 175 pages and sold for half a crown, The English Review did not exceed a circulation of 1,000 during Hueffer's editorship.

With the magazine struggling, Hueffer sold the magazine after publishing twelve issues to Alfred Mond. With Hueffer departing as editor, Mond brought in Austin Harrison as Hueffer's successor. Harrison maintained the high quality of contributors, and broadened the scope of the review to include women writers and writers from abroad. In addition to continuing to print works by Conrad, Lawrence, Graham and Wells, authors such as Sherwood Anderson, Anton Chekhov, Hermann Hesse, Aldous Huxley, Katherine Mansfield, Bertrand Russell, G. B. Shaw, Ivan Turgenev and William Butler Yeats now appeared in the magazine's pages. Coverage of politics also increased substantially, reflecting Harrison's background as a journalist.

Harrison courted controversy by challenging attitudes towards sexuality when he published works by authors such as Frank Harris, leading to condemnation in the pages of other journals. Such notoriety boosted circulation, however, as did a subsequent reduction in the magazine's cover price to a shilling. By 1915, the magazine was profitable to the point when Harrison bought out Mond, becoming the owner as well as the editor.

After the First World War, however, the journal began to decline. Harrison sold The English Review to Ernest Remnant in 1923 and the journal took an increasingly conservative and less literary direction. In 1937, the magazine was absorbed by The National Review.

== Editors ==
- Ford Madox Hueffer (1908–1909)
- Austin Harrison (1909–1923)
- Ernest Remnant (1923–1931)
- Douglas Jerrold (1931–1935)
- Wilfrid Hindle (1936)
- Derek Walker-Smith (1936–1937)
