= History of Air New Zealand =

The history of Air New Zealand, the national carrier of New Zealand, began when the amalgamated East Coast Airways and Cook Strait Airways began operations in January 1936 as Union Airways of New Zealand, the country's first major airline. Union Airways was the sole New Zealand aviation partner in Tasman Empire Airways Limited (TEAL), which made its inaugural flight in 1940. The New Zealand Government bought full ownership of TEAL in 1961 and the airline was renamed Air New Zealand in 1965. New Zealand's domestic airline, National Airways Corporation (NAC), was merged with Air New Zealand in 1978. Air New Zealand was privatised in 1989 but in 2001 the New Zealand Government took up 80% ownership in return for injecting $885 million after the airline ran into financial difficulty. In November 2013, the National government sold down its share in Air New Zealand from 73% to 53% as part of its controversial asset sales programme.

== Tasman Empire Airways Limited ==
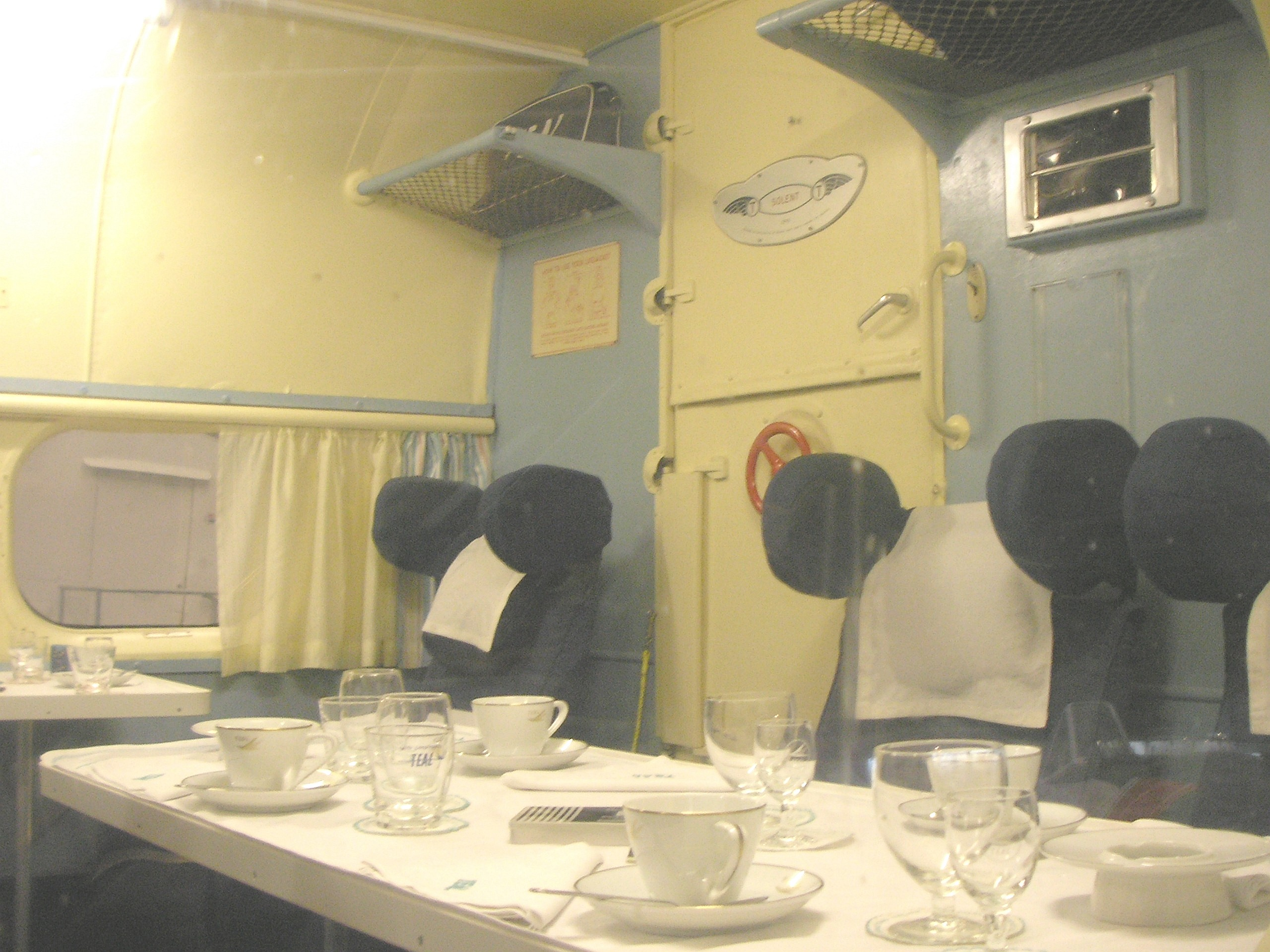
Interior of a preserved TEAL Short Solent flying boat

The airline was established as Tasman Empire Airways Limited (TEAL) on 26 April 1940. Its first flight was on 30 April 1940, with Short Empire flying boat ZK-AMA Aotearoa carrying ten passengers from Auckland to Sydney. It took around 7 hours 30 minutes to travel the 1,345 miles. TEAL's first annual report, dated 31 March 1941, revealed that 130 trans-Tasman flights had been completed, 174,200 miles flown and 1,461 passengers carried, with a profit of £31,479. During World War II TEAL undertook several special charter and reconnaissance flights to New Caledonia, Fiji, Tonga, Samoa and Hawaii to assist the war effort. In June 1944 TEAL crossed the Tasman Sea for the 1,000th time.

After World War II TEAL re-equipped, initially with Short Sandringham and later with Short Solent flying boats, and a former Royal New Zealand Air Force PBY Catalina also being used for survey flights. TEAL's initial schedule of two weekly flights from Auckland to Sydney was soon expanded with departures from Wellington, and flights to Fiji were also added during the early years. TEAL also supported the 3rd New Zealand expeditionary force to Korea (a.k.a., "Kayforce") between 1953 and 1957 by transporting soldiers and engineers from New Zealand to Iwakuni in Japan.

In 1953 the Australian Government bought 50% of TEAL, with the New Zealand Government buying the rest. In 1954 TEAL added Douglas DC-6s from the defunct British Commonwealth Pacific Airlines (BCPA) to its fleet, and these replaced the outdated flying boats on most international services. The flying boat services ended in 1960 when Tahiti's airport opened. TEAL operated services between Auckland and Fiji to replace BCPA's service. In 1955 TEAL made its 10,000th trans-Tasman crossing. In 1959 TEAL again changed its fleet, replacing the DC-6s with Lockheed L-188 Electra IIs. The turboprop aircraft was capable of carrying 71 passengers at nearly 400 miles per hour, and reduced the Auckland to Sydney flying time to 3 hours 50 minutes.

In 1961 the New Zealand Government bought the Australian Government's half share, and on 1 April 1965 the airline was renamed Air New Zealand.

== First jets ==
Revenue Passenger-Kilometres, scheduled flights only, in millions
| Year | Traffic |
|---|---|
| 1950 | 65 |
| 1955 | 102 |
| 1960 | 211 |
| 1965 | 399 |
| 1969 | 788 |
| 1971 | 1211 |
| 1975 | 2984 |
| 1980 | 5664 |
| 1989 | 10097 |
| 2000 | 22232 |

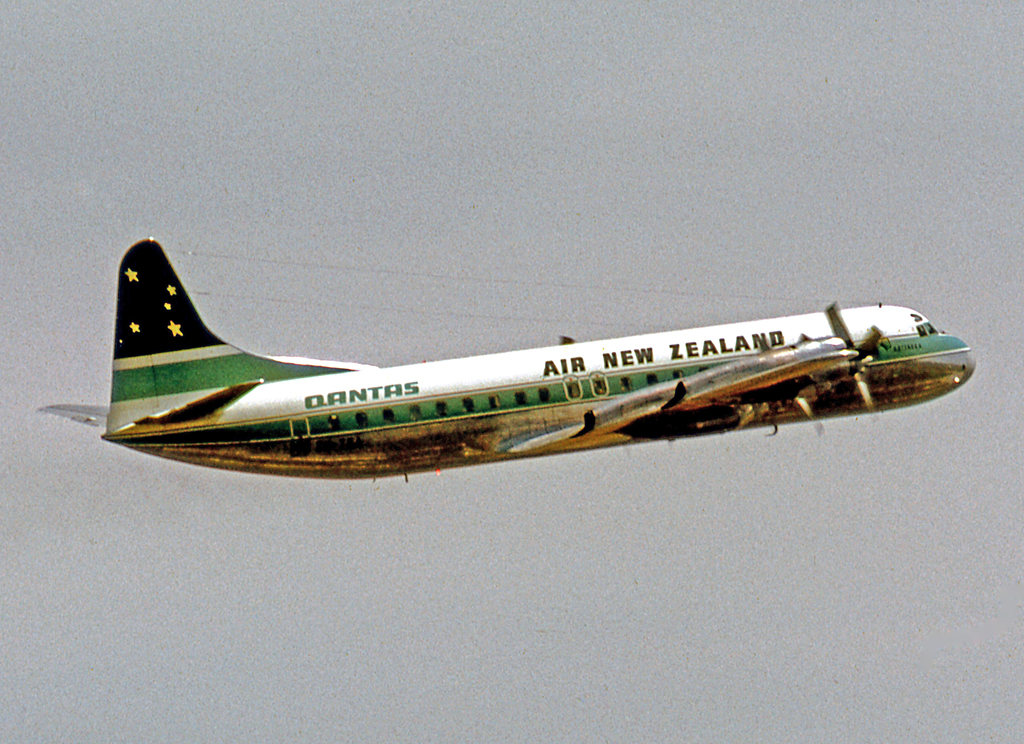
Air New Zealand Lockheed L-188 Electra departing Sydney for Wellington in 1970.

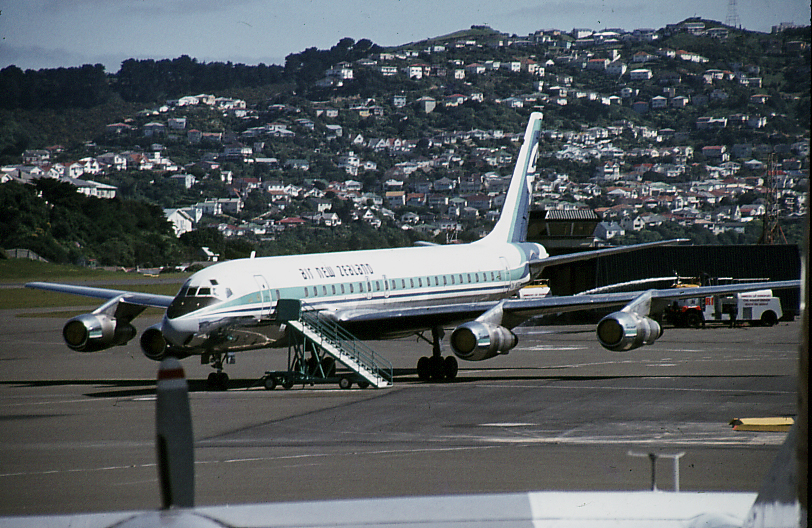
Air New Zealand Douglas DC-8 at Wellington Airport in 1980

=== DC-8 ===
On 23 September 1963 Air New Zealand signed a contract with Douglas Aircraft Company to purchase three DC-8-52 jet airliners. The first DC-8 arrived at Auckland on 20 July 1965, coinciding with the opening of Air New Zealand's jet base at the airport. The remaining two DC-8s arrived on 12 August and 22 September of that year and the inaugural jet service was a flight from Christchurch to Sydney on 3 October. The range of the jets enabled Air New Zealand to commence services to the United States and Asia for the first time – on 14 December the first Auckland to Los Angeles service took off, via Nadi and Honolulu. Services from Auckland to Hong Kong via Manila and Singapore followed in early 1966. A service to Tokyo via Nadi started in 1980.

On 4 July 1966, one of the DC-8s was written off when it crashed during a routine training flight at Auckland Airport. While the aircraft was accelerating for takeoff, the number four (outer starboard) engine was throttled back to simulate an engine failure. However, the rapid movement of the throttle level needed to achieve this caused an inertia which resulted in the lever entering the reverse thrust setting. This meant that the airspeed necessary to gain control of the aircraft was never reached, and the starboard wing tip impacted the ground causing the DC-8 to cartwheel along the runway for several hundred yards. Two of the five crew died.

Early in 1968 two more DC-8-52s were ordered, the first arriving on 29 January and the second on 28 February; these had the same seating layout as the earlier planes but had slightly more powerful engines. A sixth DC-8 was leased from United Airlines in November 1970 and purchased in July 1971. A seventh and final DC-8 was purchased from United Airlines, this one in October 1971.

=== DC-10 ===
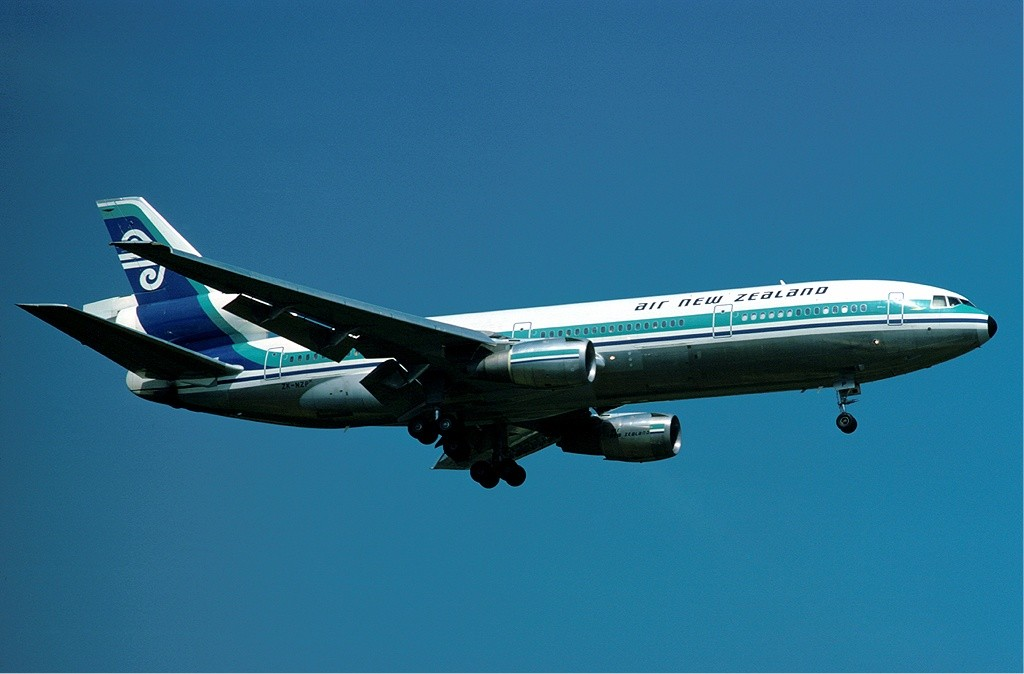
Douglas DC-10 at London Heathrow in 1977 while on hire to British Airways. This particular aircraft, ZK-NZP, crashed into Mount Erebus.

Having considered the DC-8 Super Sixties and the Lockheed L-1011, Air New Zealand ordered eight Douglas DC-10-30s, the first of which arrived on 27 January 1973. The DC-10s introduced a new paint scheme, with a koru featuring on the tail in the style of a Maori waka (canoe) stern post instead of the previously displayed Southern Cross; this scheme spread to the DC-8s during 1973. The longer range of the DC-10 opened up routes to Asia and eliminated the stop at Manila on the Auckland to Hong Kong route in 1975. It also allowed for expanding trans-Pacific services. The first service to Perth was started in 1980.

In 1979 the crash of American Airlines Flight 191 led to a global grounding of all DC-10s, stranding hundreds of passengers on both sides of Air New Zealand's Los Angeles–Auckland route. The airline chartered a Pan Am Boeing 747 to transport stranded passengers and to keep a shuttle service open. The airline's two remaining DC-8s maintained a trans-Tasman shuttle service along with its single international standard equipped Boeing 737-200, ZK-NAR. The decision not to take up NAC's purchase rights of the trans-Tasman capable Boeing 727-200 had come back to haunt the airline. With no DC-8 replacement in sight Air New Zealand began looking for a mid-sized wide bodied jet and ordered the Boeing 767-200ER in 1983.

== Merger with NAC ==
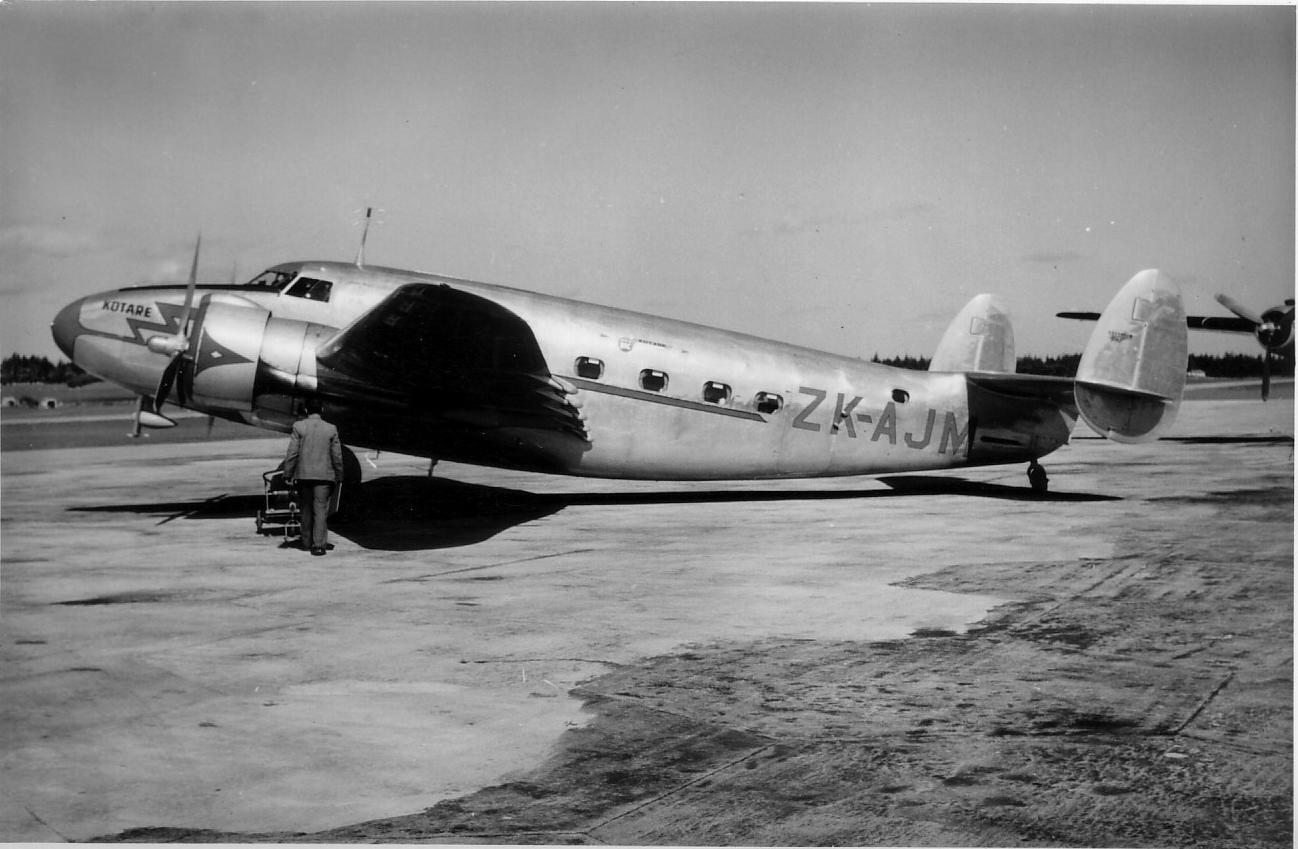
National Airways Corporation Lockheed Lodestar "Kotare", inherited from Union Airways

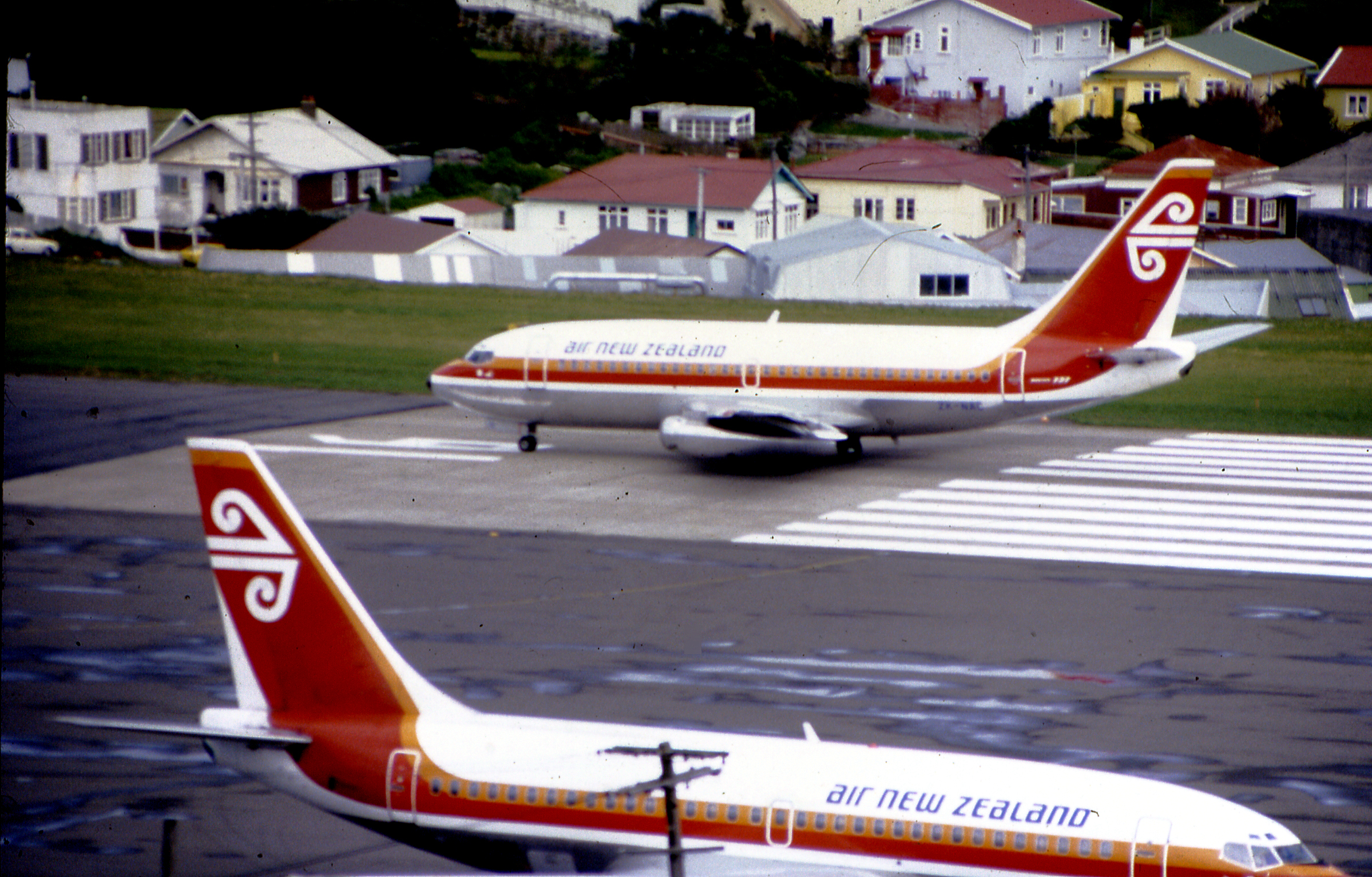
Boeing 737s in hybrid Air New Zealand and National Airways Corporation livery at Wellington Airport in 1980

In 1947 a domestic competitor appeared in the form of the Government-owned National Airways Corporation (NAC), formed when the New Zealand government nationalised Union Airways and a number of other smaller operators. NAC was initially equipped with de Havilland Dragon Rapides, de Havilland Fox Moths, Douglas DC-3s, Lockheed Electras and Lockheed Super Electras. In the late 1940s NAC also provided international services to nearby South Pacific countries using converted ex Royal New Zealand Air Force Short Sunderlands. These were later supplemented by de Havilland Herons, Vickers Viscounts, Fokker Friendships and ultimately Boeing 737s. In 1972 NAC purchased a freight subsidiary, Straits Air Freight Express, which operated Bristol Freighters and Armstrong Whitworth AW.660 Argosy freighters.

On 1 April 1978 the domestic airline NAC was absorbed into Air New Zealand. Although both airlines had worked closely together during the 1970s, sharing aircraft etc., it was felt that NAC was threatening the airline. Qantas was feeling out a domestic partner in New Zealand and had NAC in its sights. When NAC announced plans to purchase the Boeing 727-200 to increase capacity, and wanted to reapply for some of its Pacific Island routes, Air New Zealand objected and applied pressure to the New Zealand Government that one airline would best serve the nation's interest. The relaunched Air New Zealand used the NAC NZ prefix for domestic flight numbers and the Air New Zealand TEAL TE prefix for international flights until October 1990, when NZ became universal. The order for the Boeing 727-200s was cancelled, and Air New Zealand decided to instead purchase more Boeing 737-200s. It was a decision that would come back to haunt the airline as it would not have a mid-sized aircraft to support the DC-10s when the last DC-8s were due to retire in 1981.

== Mount Erebus disaster ==
On 28 November 1979 Air New Zealand flight 901, a scheduled sightseeing flight over Antarctica, crashed into Mount Erebus. The Douglas DC-10-30 disintegrated on impact killing all 237 passengers aboard as well as the 20 crewmembers. This remains New Zealand's deadliest disaster.

== 1980s ==
In 1981 Air New Zealand ordered its first wide-bodied Boeing type; the Boeing 747-219 was delivered, starting the replacement of the DC-10s. The DC-10s were leased out, the last service being in 1983, and all were sold by the end of 1986.

In 1982 the first Air New Zealand flight to London in its own right (via Papeete and Los Angeles) took place. Air New Zealand was now a global airline. By 1988, the airline was operating weekly roundtrip Boeing 747 service between Auckland and London via Dallas/Fort Worth.

In 1985 the first Boeing 767-200s were delivered. This type filled the medium range and payload gap vacated by the DC-8 and DC-10s. This allowed the airline to service the trans-Tasman route with a more intensive frequency to the major capitals not allowed by the larger Boeing 747s. Flights to Perth also used the aircraft. The Boeing 767 was also used for main trunk domestic services.

Female cabin crew won an important victory in 1988 when the Equal Opportunities Tribunal declared that the airline was blatantly discriminating against them by denying them equal promotion and pay raise opportunities with their male counterparts. The airline and the union representing the airline employees had been unsympathetic to the females plight – one complaining female steward had her house shot at by an unidentified gunman – but the ruling ensured that the discrminatory practices against the female cabin crew were ended.

Air New Zealand, along with Qantas helped to pioneer Extended range, Twin engine, Operations ETOPS. This allowed use of the efficient Boeing 767 over long range water routes. Originally the 767s were to stay within two hours flying time of an acceptable airport but this extended to three and even four hours. (The ETOPS rating is applied to individual aircraft, not the type in general. Today all twin engine commercial types can be rated to ETOPS standard, usually as part of a 'new aircraft' programme such as the Embraer E-190.)

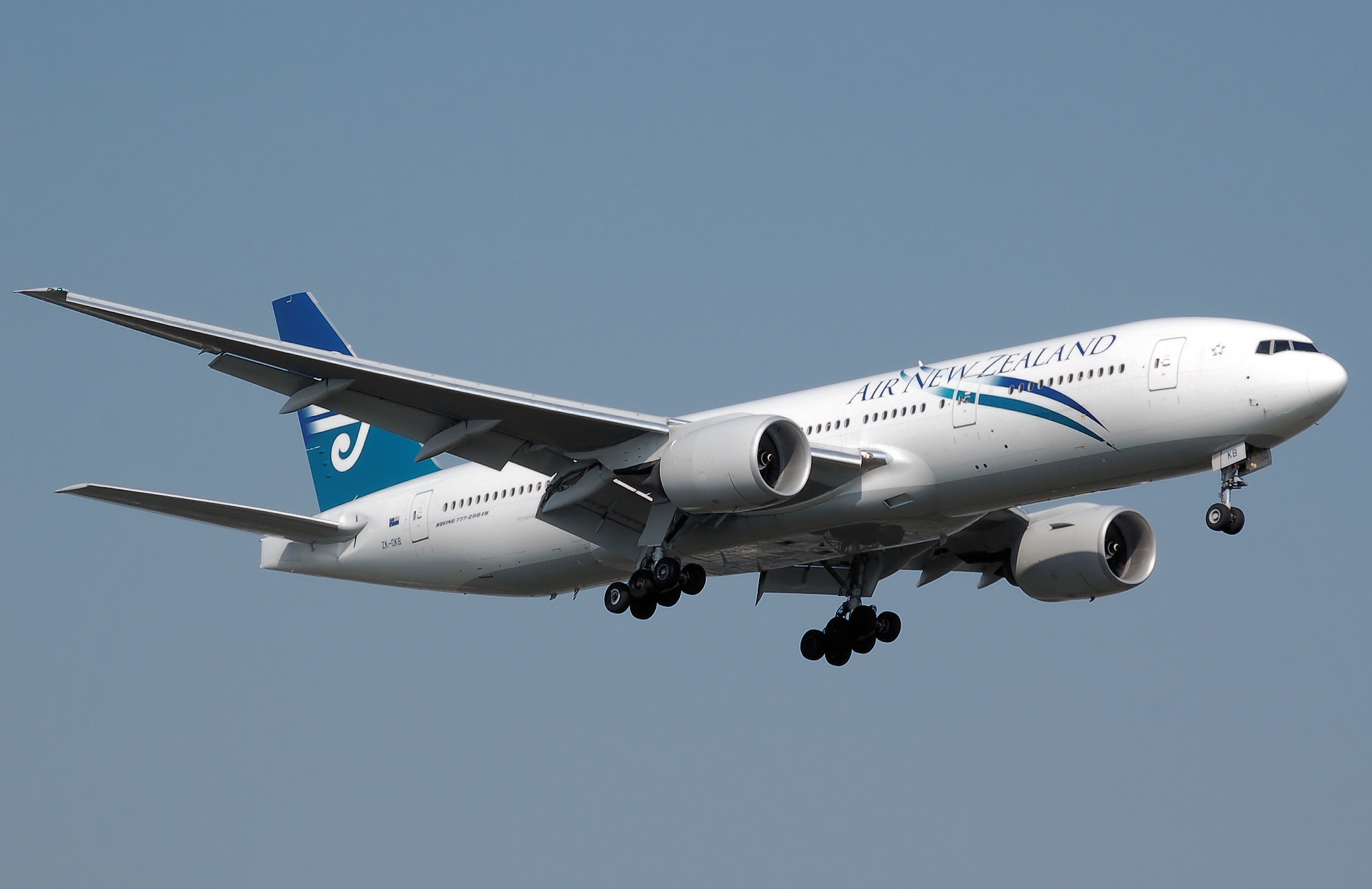
Air New Zealand Boeing 777-200ER lands at London Heathrow

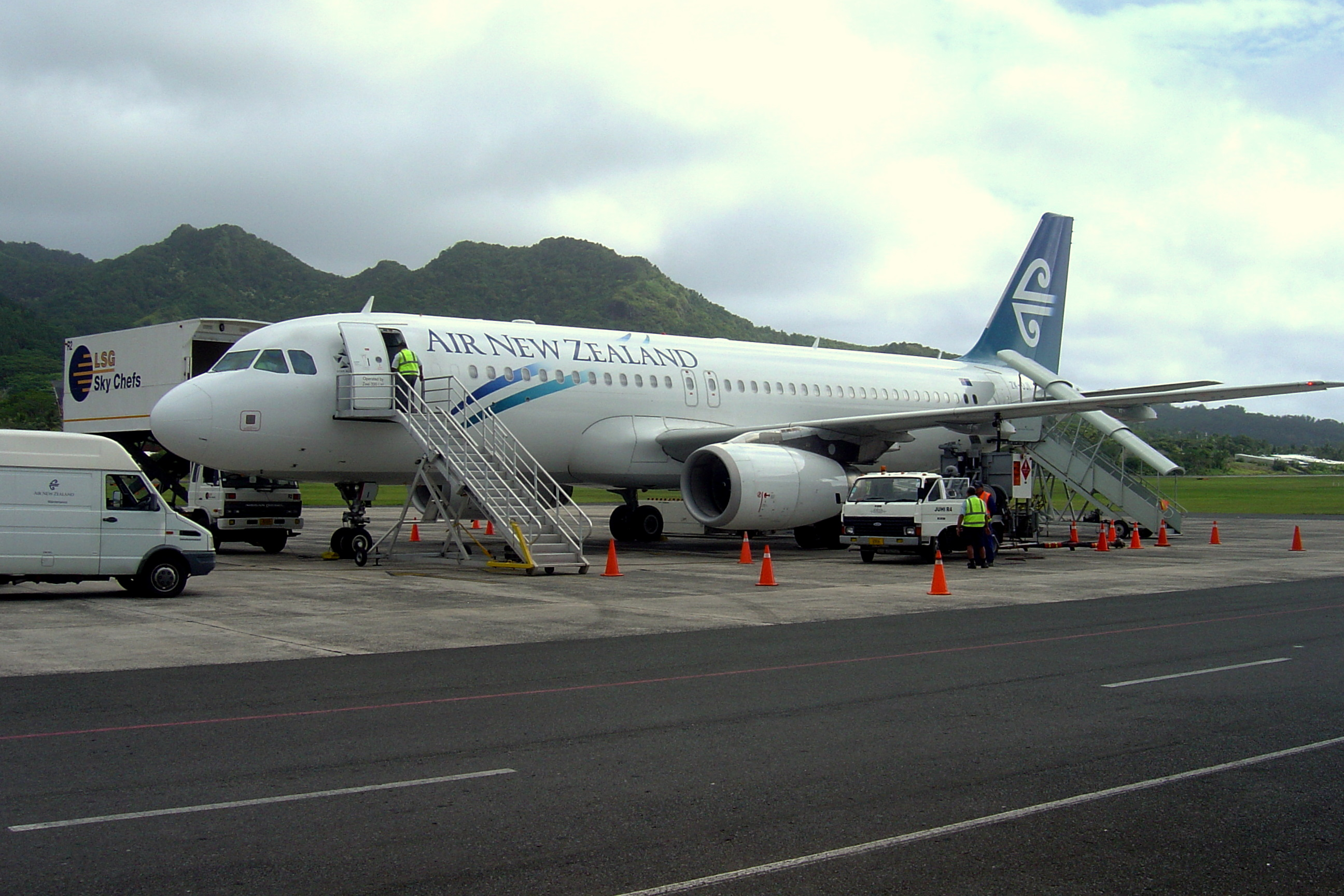
Air New Zealand Airbus A320 at Rarotonga Airport

== 1989 onwards ==
=== New ownership and stock-exchange listing ===
In October 1989 the Government of New Zealand privatised Air New Zealand, selling to a consortium headed by Brierley Investments. Brierley retained 65%, with 30% to be sold to the New Zealand public, staff, and institutional investors — Qantas with 19.9%, Japan Airlines 7.5%, American Airlines 7.5%, and a New Zealand Government "Kiwi share" made up the balance. The Kiwi share has special powers to ensure that New Zealanders retain the majority shareholding. In the same year Air New Zealand listed on the New Zealand Exchange.

=== Newer aircraft ===
In early 1990 Air New Zealand took delivery of its first Boeing 747-400, but industrial action by pilots and cabin crew forced the first aircraft to be leased to Cathay Pacific. The company and its staff had to re-negotiate rates of pay and long hours in the air due to the model's then excellent range before the airliner entered mainline service. The first 747-400 flight finally took place in late 1990.

In 1991 Air New Zealand received its first Boeing 767-300, a major improvement and supplement to the seven Boeing 767-200ERs then in service. The 767-300ER variant provided the option of increased range and capacity; it allowed Air New Zealand to open new routes into Asia and to increase frequency on the trans-Pacific service with the introduction of a second daily flight to Los Angeles via Honolulu and later a third via Rarotonga and Apia on alternating days. The Boeing 767-300ERs are retrofitted with winglets to improve on more efficiencies this airliner has to offer. Although the Boeing 767 fleet has reduced due to the arrival of the Boeing 777-200ER, plans envisaged the Boeing 787-9 replacing the last of the type from 2014.

The early 1990s saw new routes added:

- 1990: Kuala Lumpur, Denpasar, Bangkok
- 1991: Nagoya, Taipei
- 1993: Seoul
- 1994: Sydney – Los Angeles, Osaka
- 1995: Fukuoka

=== Australia ===
After the success of the deregulation of the Australian domestic air market in 1990, the Keating government in Australia announced that it would allow New Zealand carriers unlimited access to the Australian market. Air New Zealand immediately planned to operate frequent services between the major Australian cities. However, at the last minute the Australian Transport Minister Laurie Brereton backed out of the deal, and although Air New Zealand was allocated an increased number of international departure slots from Australian cities, it was not permitted to operate domestically within Australia. This had far-reaching implications, as Air New Zealand was forced to look at other ways of increasing its market in Australia, which resulted in the acquisition of Ansett Australia.

== Expansion ==
Air New Zealand's "Pacific Wave", introduced in 1996

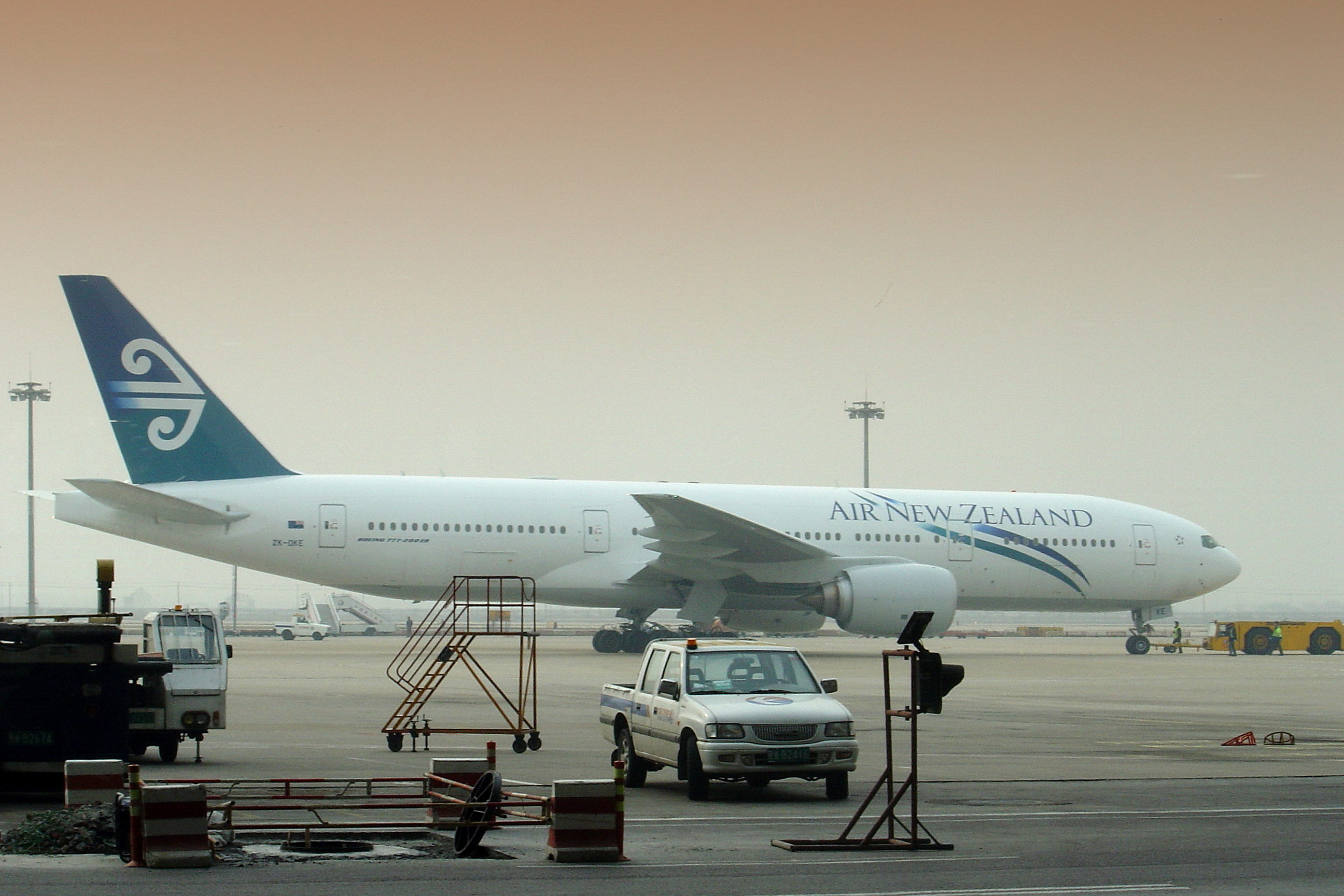
Air New Zealand Boeing 777 at Shanghai Pudong Airport in January 2007

In 1995 Air New Zealand added Fukuoka to its Japanese destinations, and announced its long-standing plan to buy 50% of Ansett Transport Industries, a significantly larger company than Air New Zealand itself. News Limited and TNT each owned 50%. Ansett held close to half of the large Australian domestic market, but had been declining for some years. Market analysts reported that Ansett had under-performing major assets and an ageing fleet, and needed a capital injection of at least A$300 million to shore up its weak balance sheet.

For Air New Zealand, purchasing TNT's half of Ansett represented a way to buy into the rich Australian domestic market. The deal had been under discussion with both of Ansett's owners since October 1994, and required some complex manoeuvring to meet regulatory requirements on both sides of the Tasman, including the sale of Ansett New Zealand, Air New Zealand's only significant home market competitor (to News Limited) to satisfy Commerce Commission requirements, and the sale of 51% of Ansett International (to a consortium of Australian institutional investors) to satisfy Australian Foreign Investment Review Board requirements that, if not met, would have meant the loss of Ansett International's bilateral air service agreement rights. The terms of the agreement saw Air New Zealand pay A$475 million for half of Ansett, including an A$150 million capital injection, and the transaction was completed on 1 October 1996.

A low-cost subsidiary, Freedom Air, began operations in 1996. In 1997 South Korean flights were suspended because of the Asian financial crisis, and a small partnership was formed with United Airlines. In 1998 EVA Air and Air New Zealand jointly started operating Boeing 767 services between Taipei and Auckland. In addition, Air New Zealand received three new Boeing Boeing 737-300s to operate on flights between New Zealand and Australia.

During 1998 the company started selling all five of its Boeing 747-200 aircraft to Virgin Atlantic, with these being disposed of during 1999 and 2000. Selwyn Cushing became the company's chairman after Bob Matthew stepped down, and also in 1998 Air New Zealand announced alliances with various airlines and the intent to become a member of the Star Alliance in 1999.

1999 saw all five weekly services to Tokyo operated by Boeing 747-400s and an additional 747 arrived in Auckland. At the end of the year, Air New Zealand and United Airlines filed for anti-trust immunity with the United States Department of Transportation because of the two companies' alliance agreements.

== Over-expansion ==
In March 1999 Ansett and Air New Zealand became full Star Alliance members. 1999 also saw the start of a long and confusing battle over ownership of Ansett. Ansett remained profitable but was having increasing difficulty in finding a way to rationalise its cost structure, and badly needed a capital injection to replace its elderly fleet. Of the two half owners, News Limited was more interested in selling out and investing the proceeds in other industries, while Air New Zealand did not have the funds to spare: with 102 aircraft, nearly 15,000 staff and a turnover of US$2.3 billion (compared with Air New Zealand's 72 aircraft, 9,200 staff and US$1.8 billion turnover) Ansett's need for capital was greater than Air New Zealand's ability to provide it—particularly given the age of Air New Zealand's own fleet.

Singapore Airlines (SIA) and Qantas expressed an interest in buying Air New Zealand, Ansett employees planned a staff buy-out, and both SIA and Air New Zealand looked at buying News Limited's 50% share of Ansett. In March 1999 SIA made a formal offer of A$500 million for a half share. Given SIA's industry-leading status, ability to fund Ansett's re-equipment and expansion and global marketing network, industry observers were enthusiastic about the move. However, as part of its original deal to buy TNT's half of Ansett, Air New Zealand had a pre-emptive right to News Limited's half, provided only that it matched or bettered other offers.

The Air New Zealand board eventually approved the sale to SIA, but negotiations stalled when major Air New Zealand shareholder Brierley Investments began buying more Air New Zealand shares and attempting to get SIA to buy Ansett through either Air New Zealand or Brierley, rather than from News Limited. In June, News Limited withdrew the offer to sell, citing "not yet resolved issues" between SIA and Air New Zealand.

At this stage, Ansett announced an unexpectedly high profit for the year—A$149 million—and News Limited took advantage of that to raise the asking price to A$1 billion. Industry analysts regarded this as far too optimistic in the notoriously boom and bust airline business, and put the true value of a half share at no more than A$700 million.

In February 2000 Air New Zealand announced its decision: it would buy the remaining half of Ansett for A$680 million. Industry observers were united in the belief that it was a bad decision: the price was probably too high, and Air New Zealand would not be able to fund the badly needed re-equipment. Monash University aviation economics academic Keith Trace commented "... by taking it on, they ensured that their own airline was in terrible danger. That was a dreadful mistake. They were taken for a ride."

Former Qantas chief financial officer Australian Gary Toomey was appointed Chief Executive Officer of both Air New Zealand and Ansett Holdings in December 2000. Services to Frankfurt, Sydney and Honolulu from Los Angeles were dropped, and were taken on by Star Alliance partners Lufthansa and United.

In 2001 Air New Zealand announced plans to buy 16 new Beechcraft 1900 aircraft to replace its Bandeirantes and Metroliners, which for 20 years had served airports that did not have jet capability.

== Ansett collapse ==
Ansett was in poor shape. Lack of proper maintenance to its 767 fleet—some of which were almost 20 years old—had seen the Australian Civil Aviation Safety Authority (CASA) ground seven aircraft two days before Christmas 2000 while inspections were carried out. In April 2001, one day before the busy Easter holiday period, all 10 Ansett 767s were grounded again when a series of other safety problems came to light, and Ansett was threatened with withdrawal of its Air Operator's Certificate.

To cover the loss of one third of Ansett's capacity, Air New Zealand chartered Ansett a Boeing 767 and a Boeing 747 from its own fleet, and additional aircraft were chartered from SIA, Air Canada and Emirates. SIA—25% owner of Air New Zealand and thus indirectly of Ansett—agreed to provide technical assistance to get the Boeing 767s back into the air.

Despite the great loss of public confidence in the airline, the news was not all bad. Chief executive Gary Toomey announced that the total cost of the groundings was only $5.2 million, and that the seven oldest Ansett Boeing 767s would be sold, along with three of Air New Zealand's 767s, and newer aircraft leased in their place. Toomey said:

What it really highlights though is that nothing has really changed in our strategy, and that is that we need to re-equip, we need to grow our capacity, we need to have new products, so I think it just brings these objectives into focus more and more by having a high profile about what's happened.

The reality was rather different. In revenue terms, Air New Zealand was the 39th largest airline in the world, Ansett 32nd. However, both airlines were only marginally profitable and needed a substantial capital injection that neither was able to provide. The larger and very successful Qantas and SIA both made offers to buy the Air New Zealand group but needed regulatory approval to lift the 25% foreign ownership rule. The Clark government refused to make a decision. Deputy Prime Minister Jim Anderton said "the idea of selling our national airline to anyone would be an anathema", even though Air New Zealand was at that time already 49.9% foreign-owned: 25% by Singapore Airlines, and 24.9% by Brierley Investments, which was originally a New Zealand-based concern but had relocated to Singapore in 2000, and circumvented the foreign ownership restrictions by using a New Zealand-based trust to hold its Air New Zealand shares.

The inconsistencies of national pride were not confined to the eastern side of the Tasman: public opinion polls showed that while New Zealanders were strongly opposed to Qantas buying into Air New Zealand, and moderately opposed to SIA increasing its stake, Australians were in favour of a Qantas buy-out of Air New Zealand but objected to any further SIA ownership of Air New Zealand (and thus Ansett).

Meanwhile, Air New Zealand's financial position was deteriorating, and Ansett was losing market share to both Qantas and a new entrant on the Australian domestic market, Virgin Blue. The Air New Zealand board decided that the answer was to still spend more money, and buy Virgin Blue as well as Ansett. On condition that that deal went through, SIA was prepared to fund the purchase of 32 new aircraft for the Air New Zealand group. Virgin Blue, however, was growing fast, largely at the expense of Ansett; the initial A$120 million offer was deemed insufficient and in August Virgin Blue owner Richard Branson, with his customary gift for publicity, put an end to negotiations when he tore up on television what he claimed was an A$250 million Air New Zealand cheque. Although the offer may have been genuine the cheque was not – it was actually a cheque from a book of one of the airport managers drawn on a Qantas' staff credit union account.

On 10 September 2001, in desperation Air New Zealand offered to sell Ansett to Qantas for $1. After two days' consideration Qantas declined, and Air New Zealand suspended trading in its shares (which had already dropped enormously) and placed Ansett in voluntary administration. Ansett was bankrupt, and Air New Zealand was in barely better shape. The following day Air New Zealand announced a staggering $1.43 billion loss: a $1.32 billion write-off of Ansett, and another $104 million lost by Air New Zealand itself.

Ansett's trading loss for the year had been $165 million (plus another $23 million for Ansett International), or about $8 million a month for most of the year, but with a sudden blow-out to around $40 million a month for the last two months.

A storm of public criticism on both sides of the Tasman erupted, and bitter accusations were levelled. In particular, it was asked how such massive losses were possible when Ansett had a healthy 74% average load factor.

In an angry statement, Air New Zealand denied that there had been a programme of last-minute asset-stripping, that it had put A$200 million of Air New Zealand fuel bills through Ansett, cleaned out Ansett's bank accounts, or taken Ansett engines and spare parts to New Zealand. Ansett's administrators subsequently verified there had been no last-minute asset-stripping, but many refused to let facts get in the way, as Air New Zealand workers in Australia were abused and spat on.

The trans-Tasman anger was enormous. At one stage, Helen Clark, then-Prime Minister of New Zealand, was on her way back to New Zealand from the Middle East when her aircraft was blockaded at the Melbourne Airport tarmac by laid-off Ansett workers, who refused to allow the jet to take off. Eventually, an RNZAF Orion maritime reconnaissance aircraft had to be sent to fetch her.

The Australian Securities & Investments Commission (ASIC) began an investigation of whether Ansett had gone on trading while insolvent, and eventually determined in July 2002 that it would be too expensive and difficult to proceed with an action which would, in any case, need to be many separate actions on behalf of individual creditors rather than just one.

It later became clear from the release of documents under the New Zealand Official Information Act that the New Zealand Government had pressured the Australian Government not to support legal action against Air New Zealand, saying that this would "prejudice rather than progress the interests of those with financial claims against the company". The Australian government stated that the pressure had no effect on its decisions.

New Zealand media criticised Australian media for "Kiwi bashing", contrasting poor coverage of instances of Australian protectionism and criticising pressure for New Zealand taxpayers to prop up the uncompetitive Australian business.

Laid-off Ansett workers were eventually paid most of their entitlements, partly from an A$150 million compensation package offered by Air New Zealand in return for having the ASIC enquiry dropped, but mostly by an A$10-per-seat levy imposed by John Howard's government on Australian airline passengers.

== Rebirth and re-nationalisation ==
In October 2001 the New Zealand Government announced that it would provide Air New Zealand with an $885 million rescue package, and in return would take up 80% ownership. Gary Toomey resigned as CEO the same month.

In early 2002 Ralph Norris, formerly head of ASB Bank, one of New Zealand's main banks, was announced as the new CEO of Air New Zealand, and commenced the difficult task of pulling the airline back from near-death.

In mid-2002 Air New Zealand announced it would reconfigure its domestic operations as a lower-cost airline, doing away with business class and meals on most domestic flights, the longest of which was 1 hour 50 minutes. The airline justified this new style of service (known as Express Class) on the basis that few people traveled business class and that travellers would rather save the money on airline ticket costs than pay extra for a meal. Although the company had online bookings for several years, it made internet sales its primary sales medium, abolished travel agents' commissions and added fees for agent, telephone and counter sales. The approach was an outstanding success, with a huge increase in internet bookings being recorded once the new fare structure was introduced, and domestic bookings eventually increasing by 23% on average. During July 2002, the airline announced an order for 15 Airbus A320-200 aircraft, to replace Boeing 737-300 and Boeing 767-200 aircraft then in use on the Tasman. Five of these would be purchased by the airline, whilst the other ten were to be leased.

In late 2002 the New Zealand Government agreed in principle to allow Qantas to purchase a 22.5% shareholding at a cost of $550 million; the purchase being subject to regulatory approval in both Australia and New Zealand. However, this proposal was met with resistance from the regulatory bodies in both countries – despite industry experts such as International Air Transport Association head Giovanni Bisignani calling their opposition "misguided" and suggesting that the proposed alliance was a model example of the only possible method of survival for smaller airlines. In late 2003 the Australian and New Zealand regulatory bodies both rejected the alliance as being anti-competitive, despite a worldwide trend for airlines to consolidate (such as the 2003 acquisition of KLM by Air France). Air New Zealand and Qantas both announced they would appeal the decisions.

In November 2003 Air New Zealand extended the successful low-cost domestic Express concept to trans-Tasman routes. Early indications are that this move has also proved successful, with an estimated 10% increase of bookings in the first few months of operation. On 30 June 2004 the airline commenced non-stop services from Auckland to San Francisco, the first new international destination for eight years. In September 2004 Air New Zealand was named Best Long Haul Airline in the seventh annual Condé Nast Traveler UK Readers' Awards.

On 20 September 2004 the New Zealand High Court blocked Qantas' plan to buy 22% of Air New Zealand. Qantas and Air New Zealand decided not to lodge an appeal. However, both Ralph Norris and his counterpart at Qantas, Geoff Dixon, stated that the airlines would continue to assess other forms of cooperation that would not conflict with competition regulations. In October 2004 SIA sold its remaining stake in Air New Zealand.

Air New Zealand started its first service to the mainland of China with the launch of Auckland to Shanghai in November 2006. Following that success Beijing was added on 18 July 2008. This route has since been terminated in July 2012. Flights to Bali resumed on 20 June 2012. Seasonal flights to Sunshine Coast a first for the Australian city began on 1 July 2012. This route made Air New Zealand the first overseas airline to fly into four cities of the Australian state of Queensland.

Air New Zealand ended flights to Oamaru when it stopped its twice daily service from Christchurch on 1 January 2010. Wānaka lost its only air service when Air New Zealand ended its link from Christchurch on 31 January 2013. However Perth to Christchurch seasonal non-stop flights will resume on 4 December 2013. Air New Zealand has begun another expansion of its international services with flights to Singapore resuming and the opening up of Houston and Buenos Aires. Flights to Houston and Buenos Aires began in December 2015. Air New Zealand ended all Beech 1900D 19 seat flights in 2014/15 and ended air services to Kaitaia, Whakatane and Whanganui.

In 2005, Rob Fyfe COO took over as CEO.

== 2010s ==
On 21 December 2010, the New Zealand government approved an alliance between Air New Zealand and Australian airline Virgin Blue (now named Virgin Australia), which allowed both airlines to expand operations between Australia and New Zealand with codeshares for trans-Tasman and connecting domestic flights; and reciprocal access to frequent flyer programmes and airport lounges. Air New Zealand subsequently purchased a 26% shareholding in Virgin Australia Holdings (Virgin Australia's parent company) to cement the relationship. By October 2016 Air New Zealand had sold its remaining stake in Virgin Australia Holdings. Air New Zealand ended its partnership with Virgin Australia on 28 October 2018.

In 2011, Air New Zealand introduced the Boeing 777-300ER airliner, as well as the Economy Skycouch, a set of three economy class seats that could be converted into a flat multi-purpose surface by raising the leg rests. After a four-year delay, Air New Zealand took delivery of its first Boeing 787-9 on 9 July 2014. The airline retired its last Boeing 747-400 in September 2014, the last Boeing 737 in September 2015, and the last Boeing 767 in March 2017, leaving it with a simplified fleet of Airbus A320 aircraft for short-haul and Boeing 777 and Boeing 787 aircraft for long-haul.

In November 2013 the New Zealand Government reduced its share in Air New Zealand from 73% to 53% as part of its controversial asset sales programme, realising $365 million.

In June 2012, Christopher Luxon was appointed as CEO of Air New Zealand. In mid June 2019, Luxon announced that he was resigning as CEO in order to pursue a career with the New Zealand National Party. In mid October 2019, Air New Zealand named Greg Foran, the former present and chief executive officer of Walmart US, as its new CEO.

On 23 October 2019, Air New Zealand announced it would terminate flights between Los Angeles and London, after 38 years. Air New Zealand started a three-weekly service to Chicago using 787s on 30 November 2018. On 17 September 2022 Air NZ started a three-weekly service to New York JFK Airport using their Boeing 787s.

=== Earthquake emergency airlift operations ===
On 22 February 2011 at 12:51 pm local time, New Zealand's second-largest city, Christchurch, was devastated by a 6.3 magnitude earthquake, causing loss of life and extensive damage to the city. Christchurch International Airport was immediately closed for 18 hours to allow airport management to assess the runway, allowing only the most urgent medical and rescue flights. After the "all clear" was given the airport was opened to international emergency aid flights. The airline drafted in all its available spare aircraft to airlift stranded tourists and refugees out of the shattered city. The airline also provided $50 airfares to allow everyone to leave on flights served directly by the city. Some Auckland-bound domestic services were flown by Boeing 747-400, Boeing 777-200ER and the airline's new Boeing 777-300ER types. Wellington had Boeing 777-200ER and Boeing 767-300s serving, aircraft that are seldom seen at that airport. Provincial destinations such as Hamilton, Palmerston North, and Invercargill also received narrow bodied jet fleet aircraft equipment not usually seen at those airports.

== 2020s ==
=== COVID-19 pandemic ===
As part of the evacuations related to the COVID-19 pandemic, an Air New Zealand Boeing 777-200ER was chartered by the New Zealand government to evacuate citizens and residents from Wuhan. The aircraft arrived back in Auckland on the evening of 5 February 2020 with 193 passengers on board: 98 New Zealand citizens and residents, 23 Australian citizens, and the remainder from various Pacific islands.

On 16 March 2020, Air New Zealand announced that it would be reducing its long-haul capacity by 85% and slashing 30% of its staff members in response to the COVID-19 pandemic in New Zealand. While the airlines has suspended several international and domestic services, it would maintain enough overseas flights for returning New Zealanders and evacuees.

On 17 March, the New Zealand Government provided the airline industry with a $600 million support package as part of its $12.1 billion COVID-19 coronavirus business package; however, this did not include any provision for Air New Zealand. In mid-March 2020 it was confirmed that due to the company's high debt levels and the impact of Coronavirus, the government of New Zealand was in negotiations with Air New Zealand for a bailout package estimated to be between $2 billion and $3 billion NZD.

On 19 March, Air New Zealand shut down its London cabin crew base in response to the coronavirus, affecting 130 flight attendants.

On 20 March, the government agreed to a $900 million loan facility with Air New Zealand to protect essential air routes and to keep the company operating. The loan will be provided in two lots: a tranche of $600 million with interest rate expected to be between 7 per cent and 8 per cent per annum and a second tranche of $300m at an expected 9 per cent per annum. As at 11 June 2020 the loan was yet to be drawn.

On 7 April, it was reported that Air New Zealand was negotiating with the New Zealand Air Line Pilots' Association (NZALPA) over plans to lay off 387 pilots as part of cutback measures.

On 20 May, Air New Zealand announced that it would be laying off 3,500 personnel including 1,300 cabin crew. In addition, it was reported that 950 long and mid-haul crew will lose their jobs while 300 workers will be made redundant in Auckland, Wellington, and Christchurch. 97 jobs were also lost at Air NZ's regional airlines Air Nelson and Mount Cook Airline.

On 16 June, it was reported that Air New Zealand would be resuming flights between Auckland and Shanghai from 22 June.

On 16 September, it was reported that Air New Zealand had proposed laying off a further 385 cabin crew by the end of the year. In response, the trade union E Tū called on the national carrier to stop outsourcing work overseas.

On 3 October 2021, Air New Zealand CEO Greg Foran confirmed that the airline would be requiring all passengers on its international flights to be fully vaccinated against COVID-19 from 1 February 2022.

On 22 November 2021, Air New Zealand announced that it would be cancelling over a thousand flights between Australia and New Zealand in response to the Government's indication that it would not lift border restrictions in late 2021. This cancellation was estimated to affect about 20,000 trans-Tasman travellers during the 2021–2022 summer break.

On 12 September 2022, Air New Zealand dropped its facemask requirement in response to the Government's decision to end the COVID-19 Protection Framework including facemask requirements for most public settings.

=== 2021 Yemen Civil War controversy ===
On 8 February 2021, 1News reported that Air New Zealand's business subsidiary Gas Turbines had been servicing two marine engines and one turbine for the Royal Saudi Navy through a third party contract until eight weeks ago. This contract drew controversy due to the Royal Saudi Navy's blockade of Yemen in the ongoing Yemeni Civil War. The national carrier's chief executive Greg Foran apologised to the Finance Minister Grant Robertson and promised that the airline would no longer undertake any work with the Saudi military. The Green Party's human rights spokesperson Golriz Ghahraman condemned the airline's decision to enter into a contract with the Saudis and expressed solidarity with the Yemeni community. In addition, Prime Minister Jacinda Ardern criticised the contract as not passing New Zealand's "sniff test" and stated that she had asked the Ministry of Foreign Affairs and Trade to investigate the revelation Air New Zealand helped the Royal Saudi Navy.

=== 2024 Tokyo flight diversion ===
In mid June 2024, Air New Zealand diverted a plane bound for Tokyo in order to ferry a business and media delegation accompanying Prime Minister Christopher Luxon on a state visit to Japan. On 16 June, an RNZAF Boeing 757 carrying Luxon and the trade delegation had broken down while refuelling in Port Moresby, Papua New Guinea. While the Boeing 757 jet was being repaired, Luxon took a commercial flight to Japan. Over 30 companies were represented in the delegation including Air New Zealand, ANZ Bank, Fonterra, Silver Fern Farms, Zespri and Rocket Lab. Luxon took a commercial flight to Tokyo while Air New Zealand diverted a plane to carry the rest of the delegation to Japan. Air NZ CEO Greg Foran subsequently flew to Japan to apologise to passengers affected by the flight diversion.

== See also ==
- Air New Zealand fleet
- History of New Zealand
- List of airlines of New Zealand
