= Air New Zealand fleet =

List of aircraft operated by Air New Zealand

The Air New Zealand fleet consists of Boeing jet aircraft for long-haul international flights, Airbus jet aircraft for domestic and short-haul international flights, and ATR 72 and Bombardier Q300 turboprop aircraft on regional domestic services.

== Current fleet ==
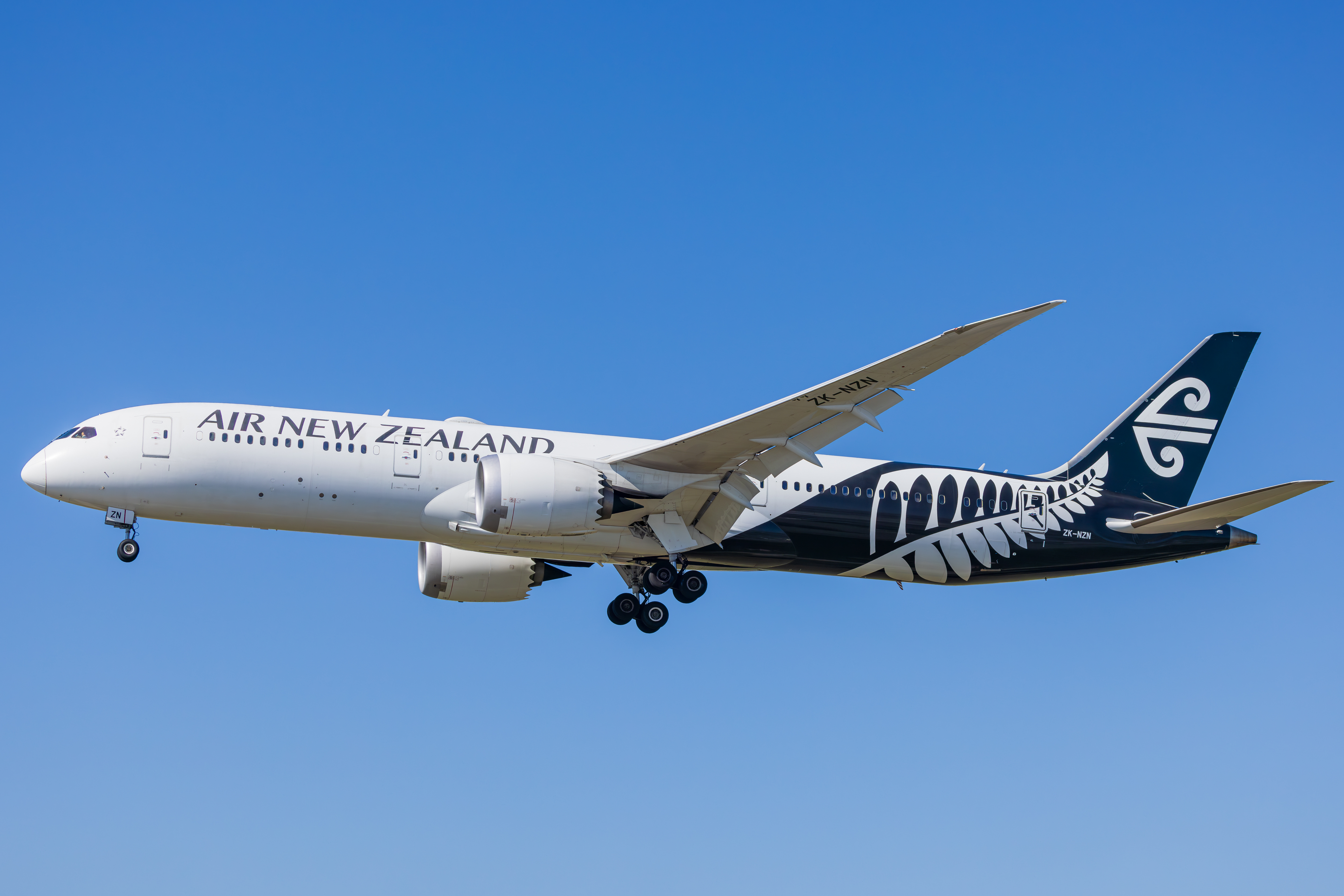
Air New Zealand Boeing 787-9

As of August 2025, Air New Zealand operates the following aircraft.

Air New Zealand fleet
Aircraft	In service	Orders	Passengers					Notes
Aircraft	In service	Orders	C+	C	W	Y	Total	Notes
Airbus A320-200	17	—	—	—	—	171	171	Domestic configuration
Airbus A320neo	6	—	—	—	—	165	165	International configuration
Airbus A321neo	9	2	—	—	—	214	214	International configuration
Airbus A321neo	5	2	—	—	—	217	217	Domestic configuration
ATR 72-600	31	—	—	—	—	68	68	
Boeing 777-300ER	7	—	—	44	54	244	342	To be retired during the 2030s and replaced by the Boeing 787-10 Dreamliner
Boeing 777-300ER	2	—	6	53	34	201	294	Ex-Cathay Pacific aircraft on dry-lease
Boeing 777-300ER	1	—	—	40	32	296	368	Ex-Cathay Pacific aircraft on dry-lease
Boeing 787-9	4	—	—	27	33	215	275	Launch customer
Boeing 787-9	4	—	—	18	21	263	302	Launch customer
Boeing 787-9	6	—	4	22	33	213	272	Cabin Retrofit Program beginning in 2025
Boeing 787-9	2	3	8	42	52	125	227	To be equipped with General Electric GEnx engines.
Boeing 787-10	—	5	TBA					To replace Boeing 777-300ER. To be equipped with General Electric GEnx engine.
De Havilland Canada Dash 8-300	23	—	—	—	—	50	50	World's largest fleet of this variant
Cargo fleet
Beta Alia eCTOL	—	1	Cargo					To be New Zealand's first electric aircraft, operating cargo services. Order with 2 options and 20 purchase rights.
Total	115	15						

The Boeing customer code for Air New Zealand was 19, which was inherited from the National Airways Corporation on its merger with Air New Zealand in 1978 (Air New Zealand itself did not own any Boeing aircraft before 1978). This means a Boeing 777-300ER built for Air New Zealand was designated a 777-319ER. Since the introduction of the Boeing 787, Boeing no longer uses customer codes.

== Fleet development ==
Current fleet of Air New Zealand

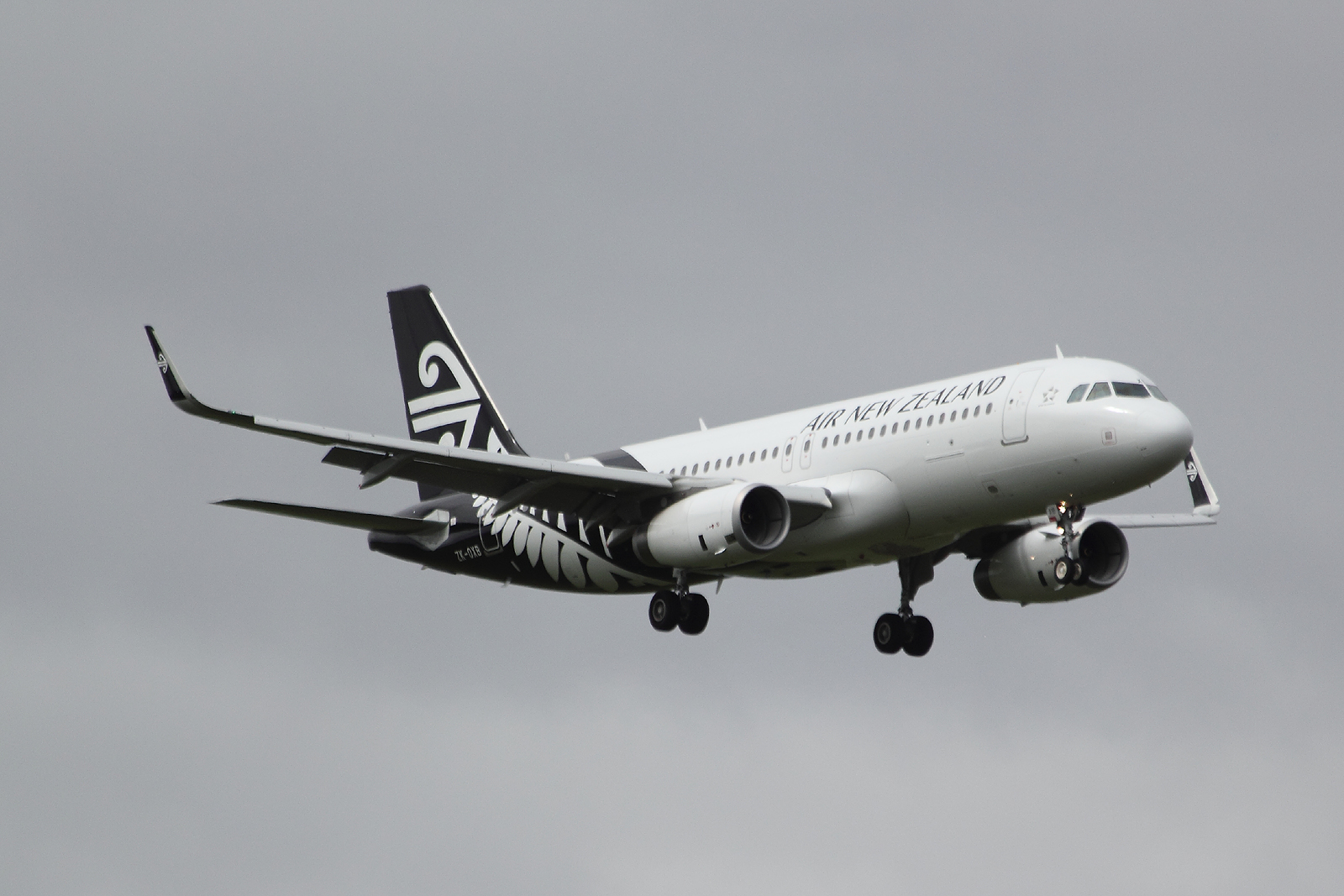
Airbus A320-200

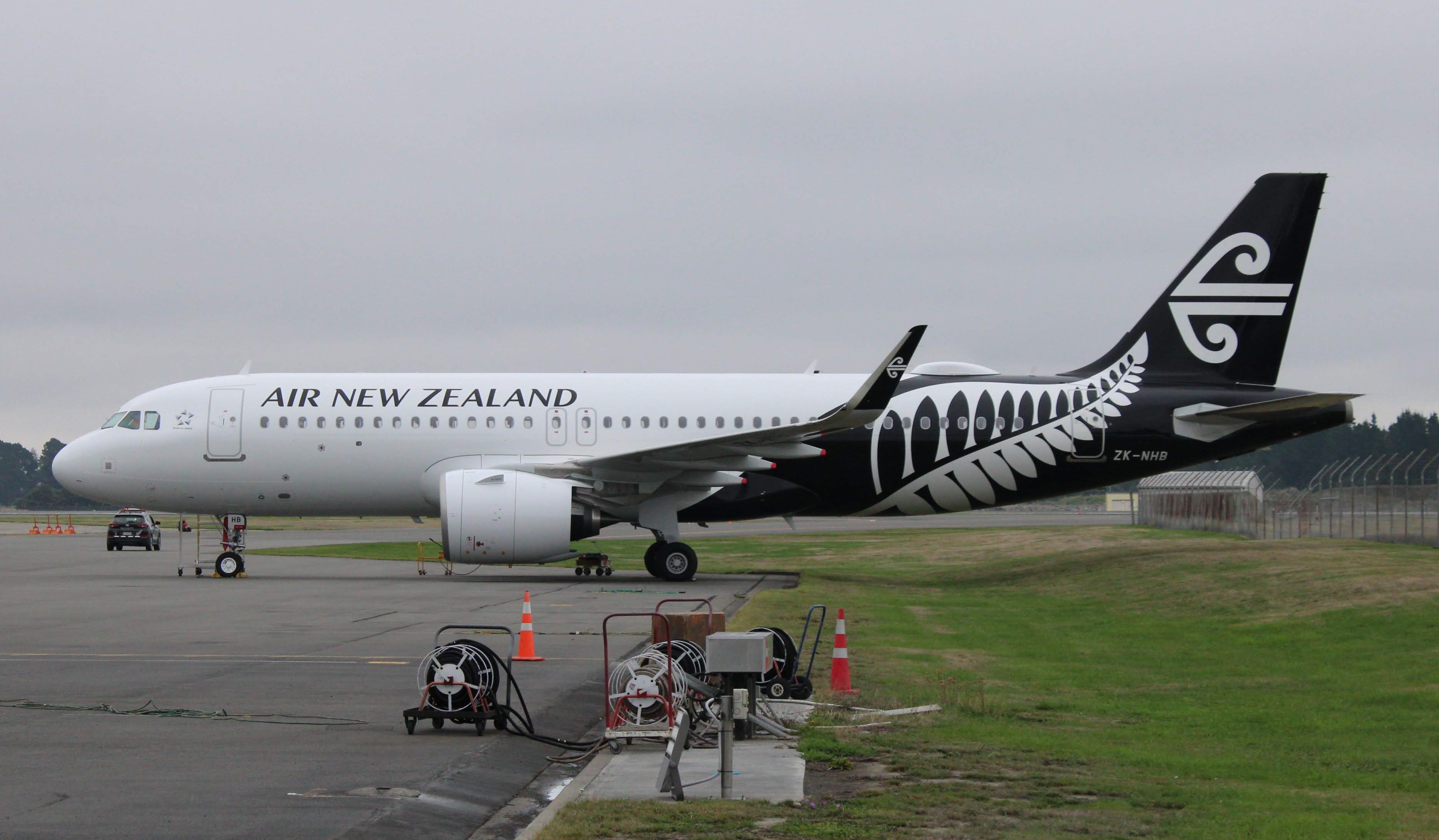
Airbus A320neo

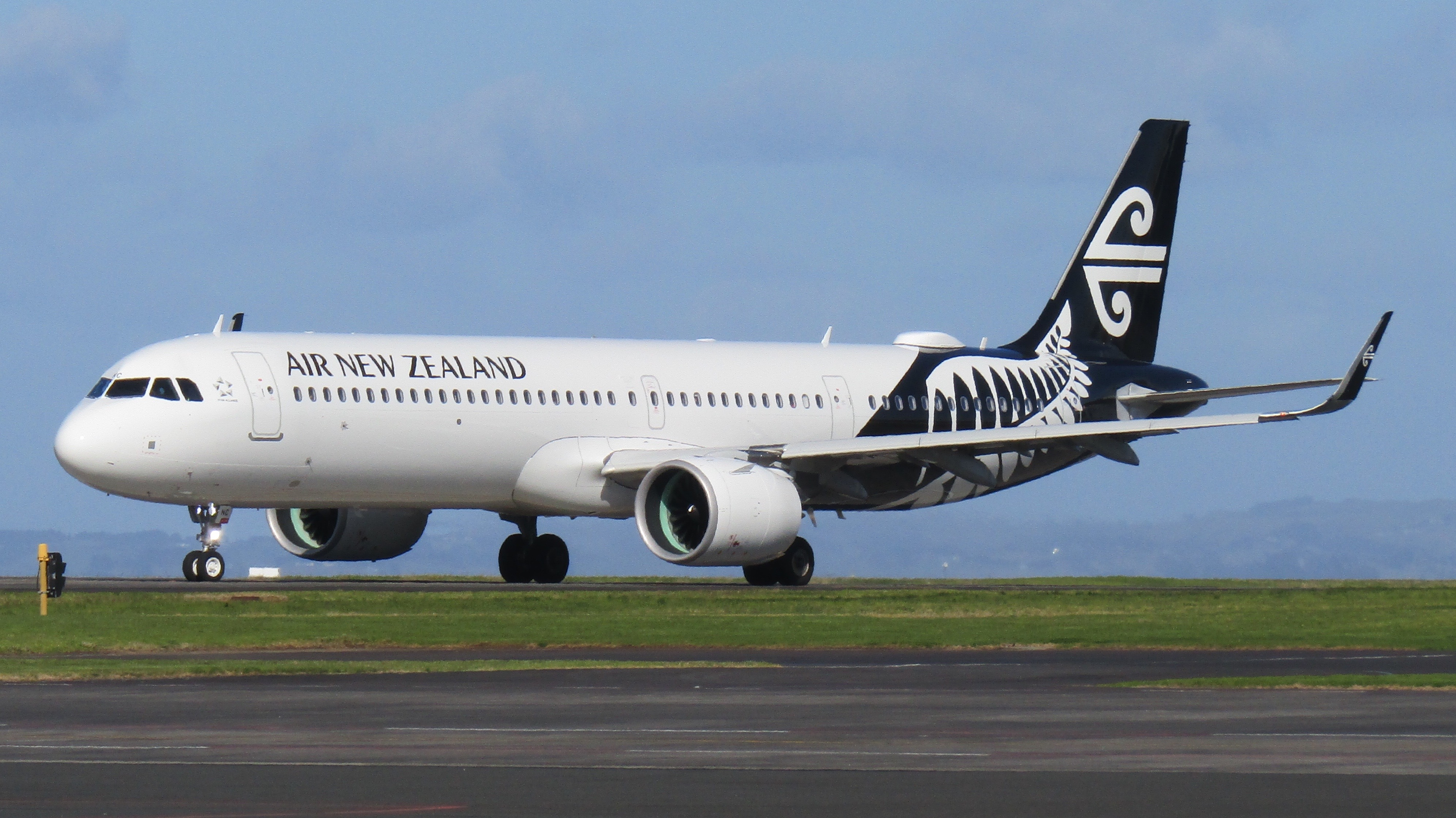
Airbus A321neo

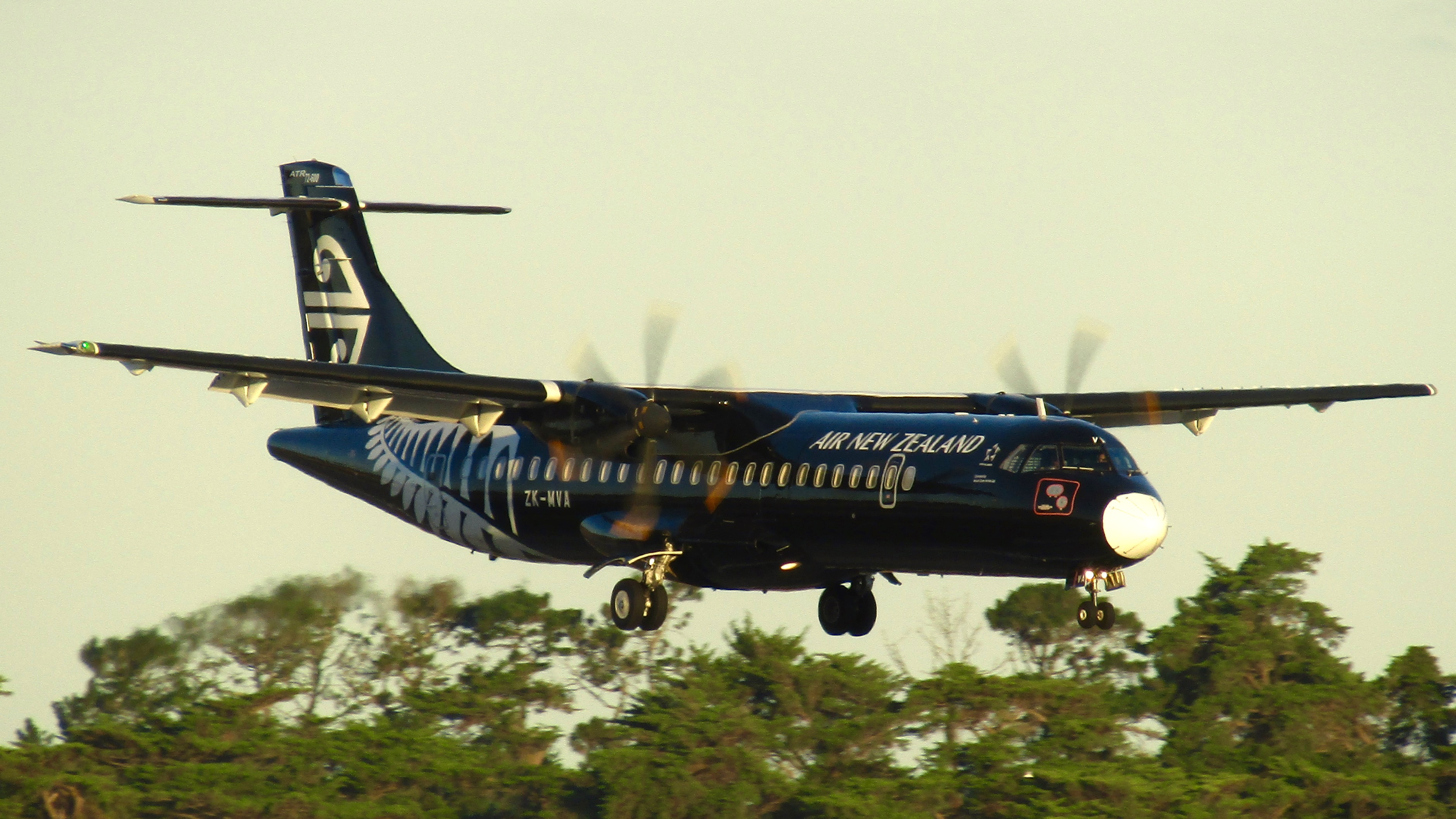
ATR 72-600

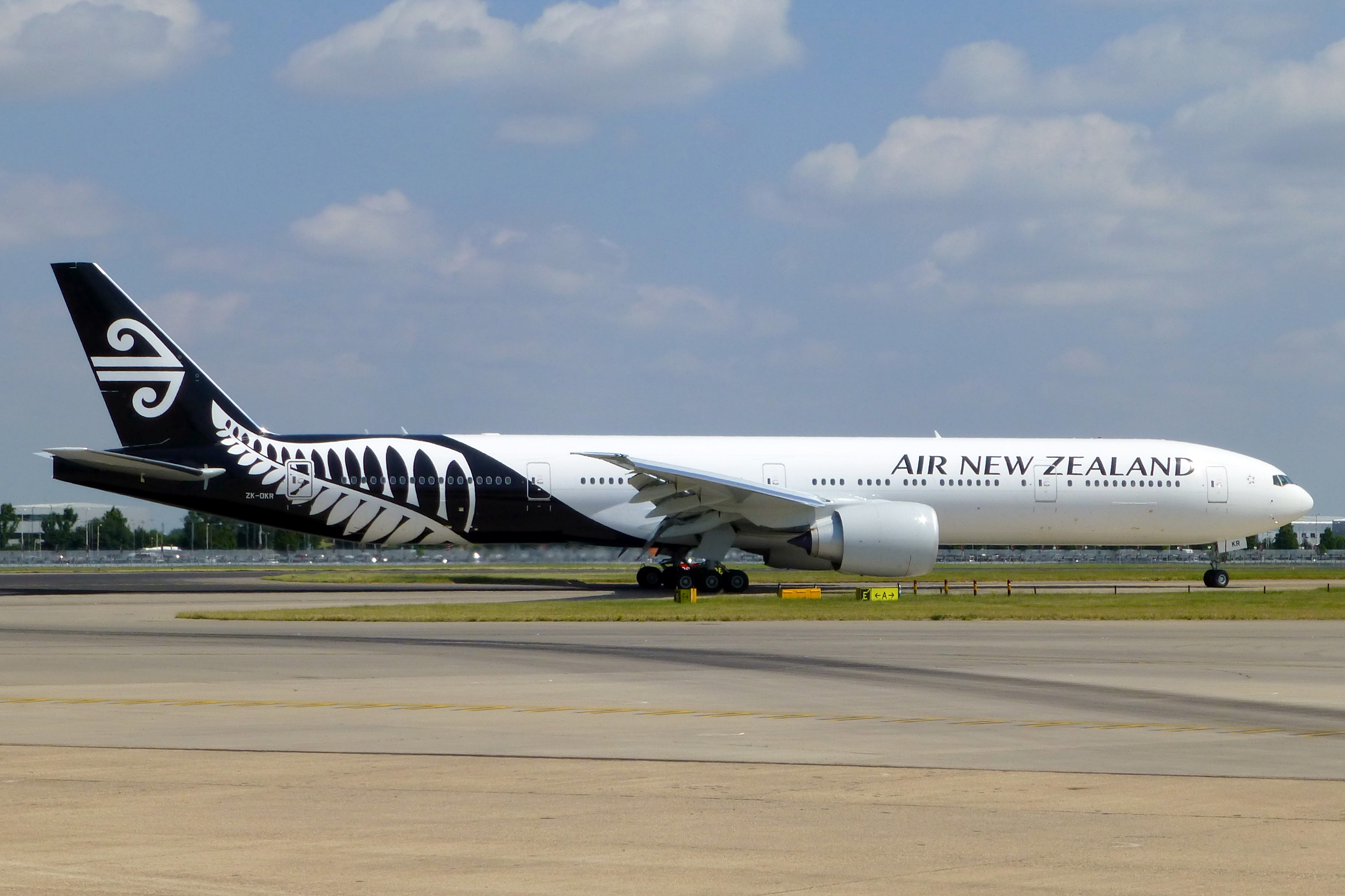
Boeing 777-300ER

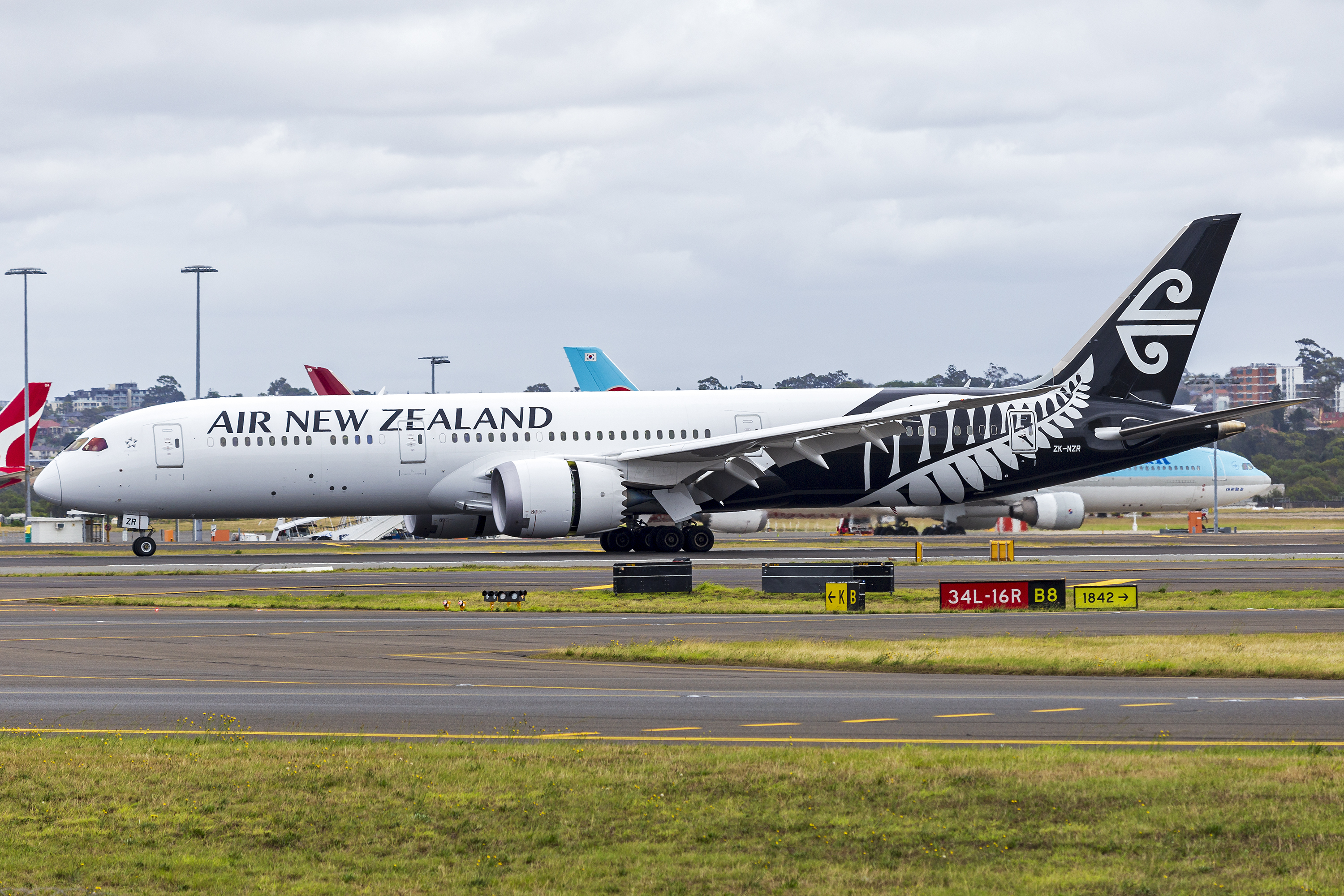
Boeing 787-9

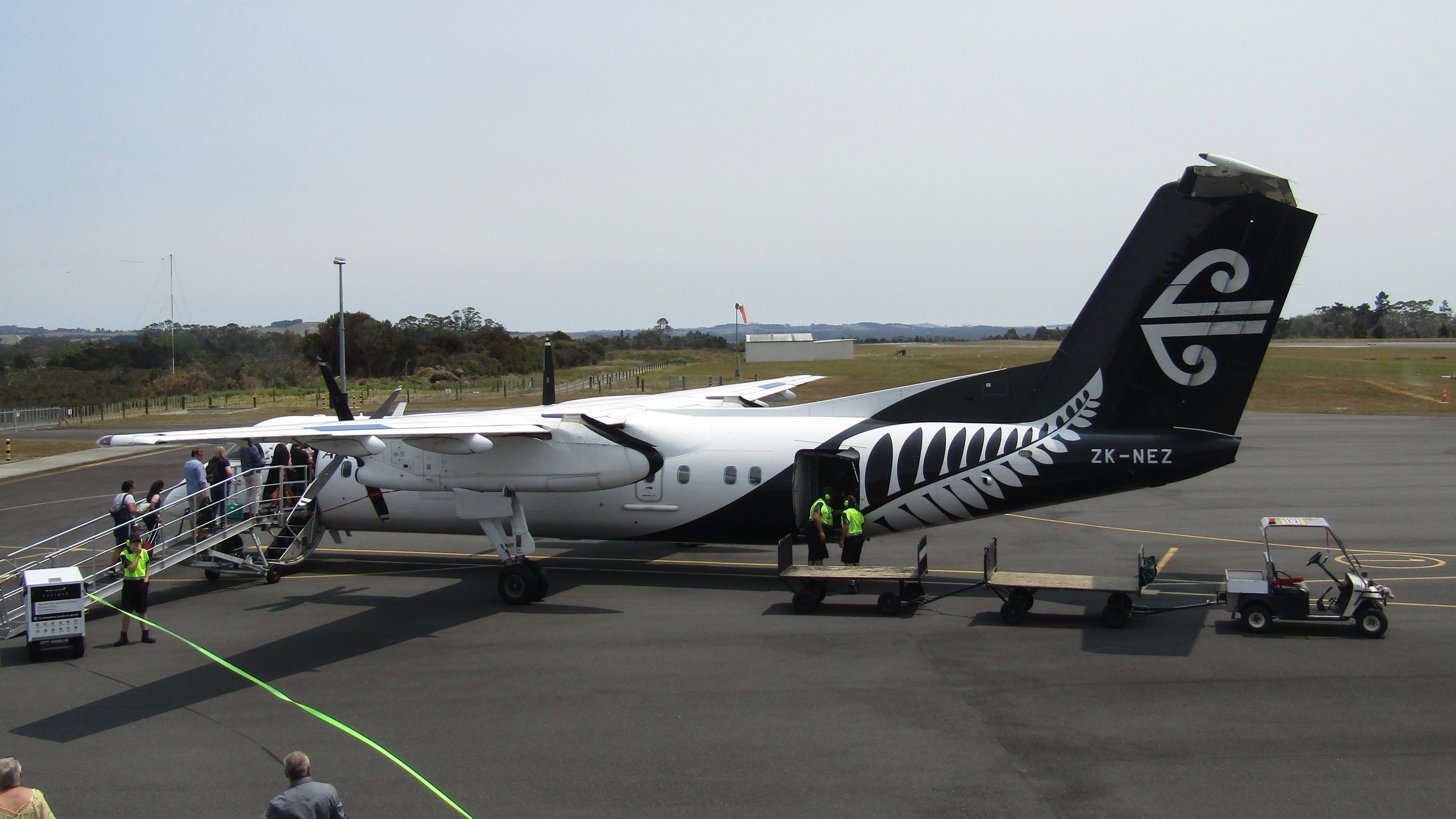
Bombardier Q300

=== Airbus A320-200 ===
Air New Zealand introduced the Airbus A320-200 in 2003, the first non-Boeing aircraft in its jet fleet since the McDonnell Douglas DC-10 was withdrawn in 1982. The A320-200 was introduced to replace the Boeing 767-200ER and Boeing 737-300 on short-haul international routes to eastern Australia and the Pacific Islands.

On 3 November 2009, Air New Zealand announced it would purchase fourteen more Airbus A320-200 aircraft to replace the Boeing 737-300 fleet on domestic routes. This allowed the airline to have a single aircraft family operating on all short-haul flights.

The international A320s were originally fitted with 8 business class seats and 144 economy class seats; in 2010 they were refitted with a 168-seat all-economy cabin to coincide with a new fare structure on flights to Australia and the Pacific Islands. The domestic A320s were fitted in a 171-seat all-economy configuration at entry into service.

=== Airbus A320neo and A321neo ===
At the start of June 2014, Air New Zealand announced it would be placing a NZ$1.6 billion order with Airbus for thirteen Airbus A320neo and Airbus A321neo aircraft. The aircraft will replace the airline's older Airbus A320s. The airline selected the Pratt & Whitney PW1100G geared turbofan engine to power its A320neo fleet. In June 2017, delivery of the A320neo aircraft was delayed until 2018 due to delivery and mechanical issues with the Pratt & Whitney engines. In August 2018, Air New Zealand announced it was ordering seven more A321neo aircraft, taking the total order to six A320neos and fourteen A321neos.

The airline's first A321neo was unveiled on 26 September 2018 and arrived in Auckland on 5 November. The aircraft entered revenue service on 23 November 2018, operating between Auckland and Brisbane.

=== ATR 72-600 ===
On 10 December 2019, subsidiary Mount Cook Airline was dissolved and merged into the main Air New Zealand airline. As a result, Air New Zealand acquired Mount Cook's fleet of 27 ATR 72-600 aircraft.

=== Boeing 777-300ER ===
Air New Zealand introduced the Boeing 777-300ER in 2010 to replace the Boeing 747-400 on long-haul routes. The model was introduced to the flagship London Heathrow – Los Angeles – Auckland route (NZ1/NZ2) in April 2011.

The 777-300ER was the first aircraft to feature the Economy Skycouch and the Premium Economy Spaceseat. As introduced, the aircraft had 338 seats – 44 business, 50 premium economy, 60 Economy Skycouch seats and 192 regular economy seats. Shortly after the introduction, one premium economy row was removed, reducing the premium economy seats to 44 and the total seats onboard to 332.

Air New Zealand refurbished the 777-300ER fleet in 2017. The Premium Economy Spaceseat product was phased out and replaced with the Premium Economy product as found on the 777-200ER and the 787-9, with recliner seats in a 2-4-2 configuration. The refit increased the number of premium economy seats from 44 to 54 and the total seats from 332 to 342.

In July 2018, Air New Zealand dry-leased an EVA Air 777-300ER as temporary cover due to ongoing issues with Air New Zealand's Boeing 787-9 fleet.

During the COVID-19 pandemic, Air New Zealand put its 777-300ER fleet into storage. Air New Zealand has confirmed it will only return six 777-300ER aircraft to its fleet, with one stored 777-300ER to be returned to the lessor in 2022. However, this decision was ultimately reversed and the last of Air New Zealand's seven 777-300ER aircraft, ZK-OKM, returned to service on 11 May 2023.

From 2023 to 2024 onward, Air New Zealand dry leased three ex-Cathay Pacific 777-300ERs amid delays with the delivery of their new 787 Family aircraft, which are now scheduled to be delivered from February 2026 at the earliest.

In May 2025 it was announced that the airline's seven core 777-300ER aircraft would remain in the fleet until the early 2030s, and were to be updated with the airline's new Business class seats, as introduced on the 787-9. The ex-Cathay Pacific 777-300ER aircraft are not included in this cabin refresh program and are expected to leave the fleet following the end of their respective short-term lease periods.

=== Boeing 787-9 ===
In 2004 the airline ordered eight Boeing 787-9 Dreamliners as the launch customer for the 787-9 model, with options on ten more. These were originally intended to be delivered beginning in late 2010, but significant developmental delays in the base 787-8 model pushed delivery of the 787-9 out to mid-2014. In February 2013, Air New Zealand exercised two options to bring the order to ten, and on 8 December 2014 exercised two more to bring the order to twelve. In February 2017, Air New Zealand announced with Air Lease Corporation a long-term lease for one new 787-9. It was scheduled to be delivered during the third quarter of 2018. The last 787-9 was expected to be delivered in late 2018.

The first aircraft was handed over to Air New Zealand on 8 July 2014 at the Everett plant and arrived in Auckland three days later. The first 787-9 service operated on 9 August 2014, from Auckland to Sydney and return. The first nine 787-9 aircraft delivered are fitted with 18 Business, 21 Premium Economy, 42 Economy Skycouch and 221 standard economy seats, totalling 302 seats. The last five have a higher premium seating configuration, with 27 Business, 33 Premium Economy, 39 Economy Skycouch and 176 standard economy seats, totalling 275 seats.

Air New Zealand's 787-9 fleet uses the Rolls-Royce Trent 1000 engines. Owing to blade cracking in the engines, Air New Zealand in 2018 altered schedules and dry-leased two Boeing 777-200ER from Singapore Airlines and a Boeing 777-300ER from EVA Air. As of June 2019, the airline was still waiting for the issue to be rectified and return the aircraft to service. These events continue to have a financial impact on the airline.

=== Boeing 787-10 ===
In June 2017, Air New Zealand CEO Christopher Luxon announced the airline was investigating new aircraft to eventually replace the 777-200ER fleet. Long-list replacement options included the Boeing 777X, the Boeing 787-10, and the Airbus A350 XWB. An RFP for replacement aircraft was issued in August 2018.

On 27 May 2019, Air New Zealand announced that they would be purchasing eight Boeing 787-10 Dreamliner aircraft, with the first aircraft expected to enter service in 2022. The order included twelve options for additional Boeing 787-9 or Boeing 787-10 aircraft. The 787-10 will be fitted with General Electric GEnx engines, in contrast to the Rolls-Royce Trent 1000 engines fitted to the airline's 787-9 fleet. On 24 September 2019, Air New Zealand officially signed the order for the 787-10.

On 28 August 2020, Air New Zealand announced that they will likely be replacing their seven Boeing 777-300ERs with six Boeing 787-10s, deliveries starting from 2022, resulting in a large down-gauge in overall international capacity due to the COVID-19 pandemic. On 18 June 2021, Air New Zealand announced that the airline had renegotiated the date for the delivery of the first of eight new Boeing 787 Dreamliners to 2024.

=== De Havilland Canada Dash 8-300 ===
On 19 November 2019, subsidiary Air Nelson was dissolved and merged into the main Air New Zealand airline. As a result, Air New Zealand acquired Air Nelson's fleet of 23 Bombardier Q300 turboprop aircraft.

== Historical fleet ==
Air New Zealand historical fleet

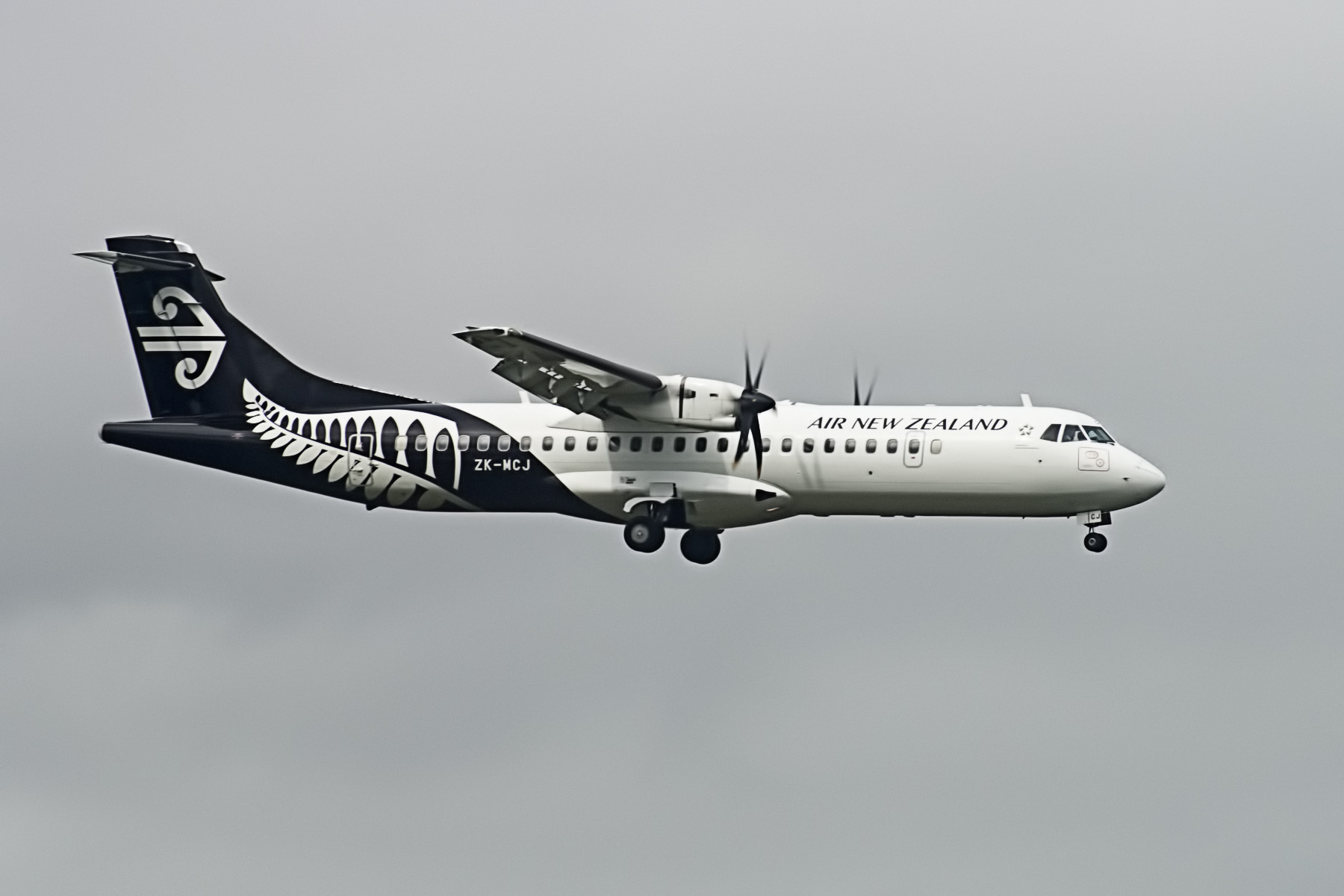
ATR 72-500

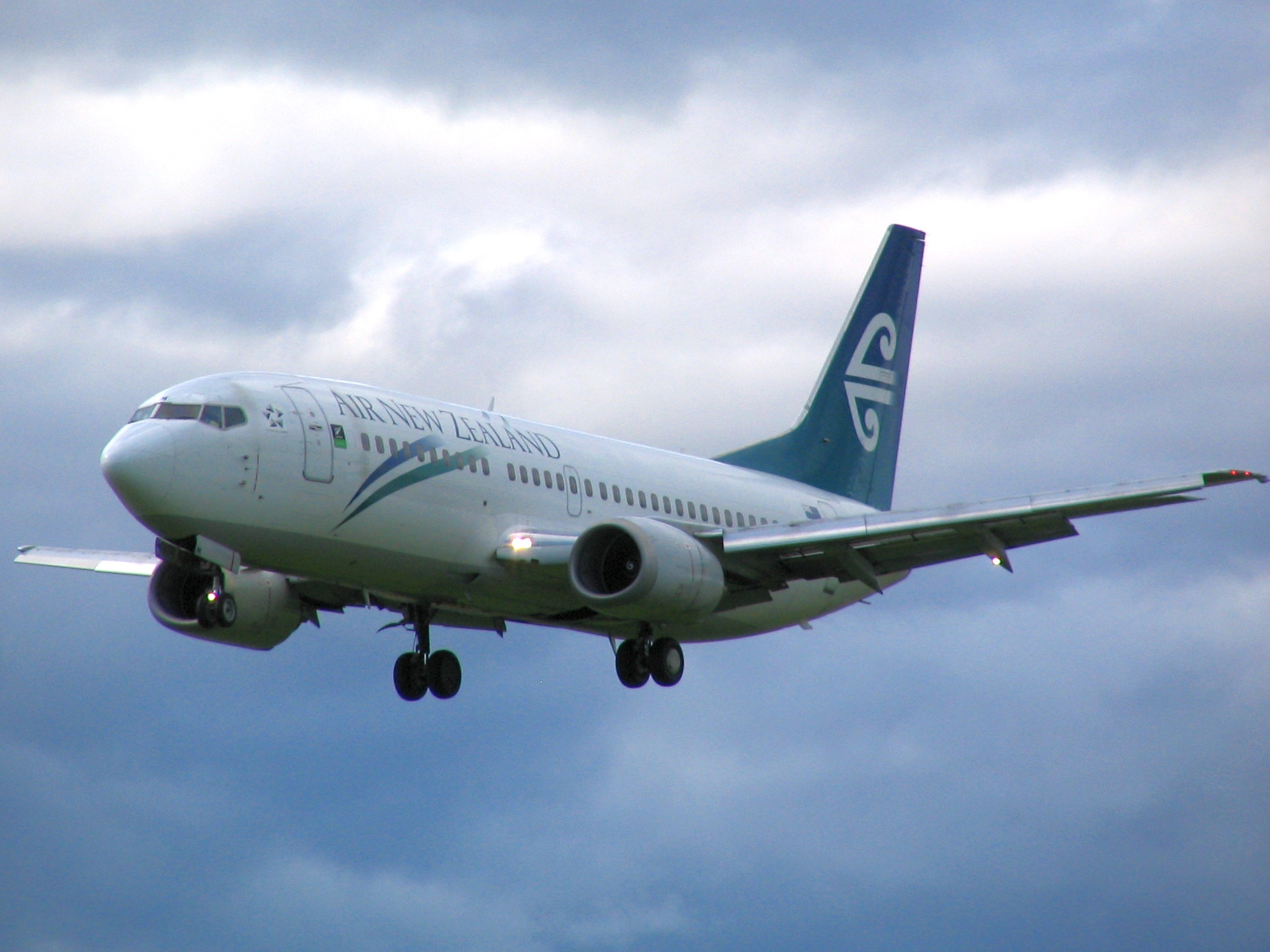
Boeing 737-300

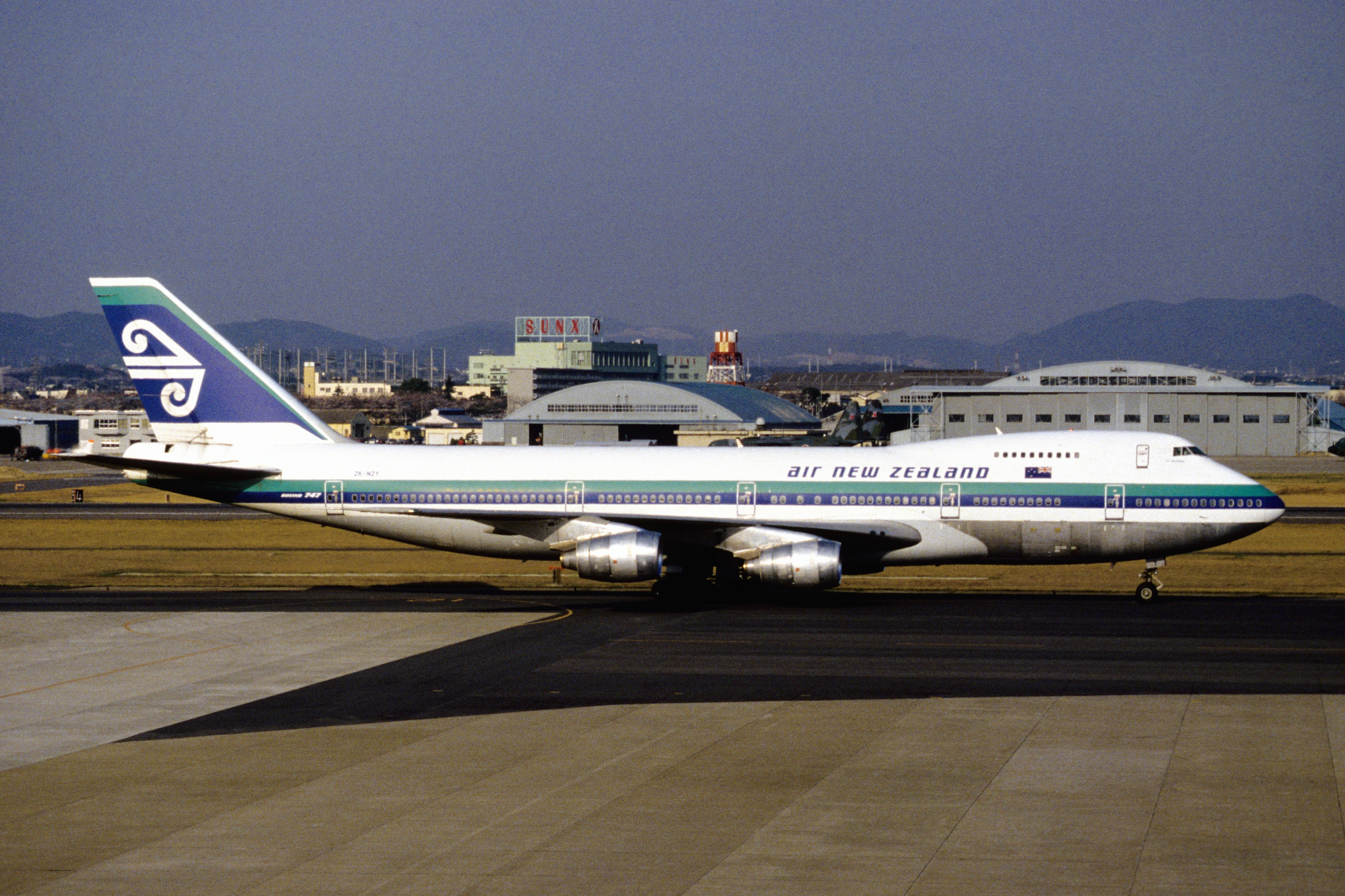
Boeing 747-200B

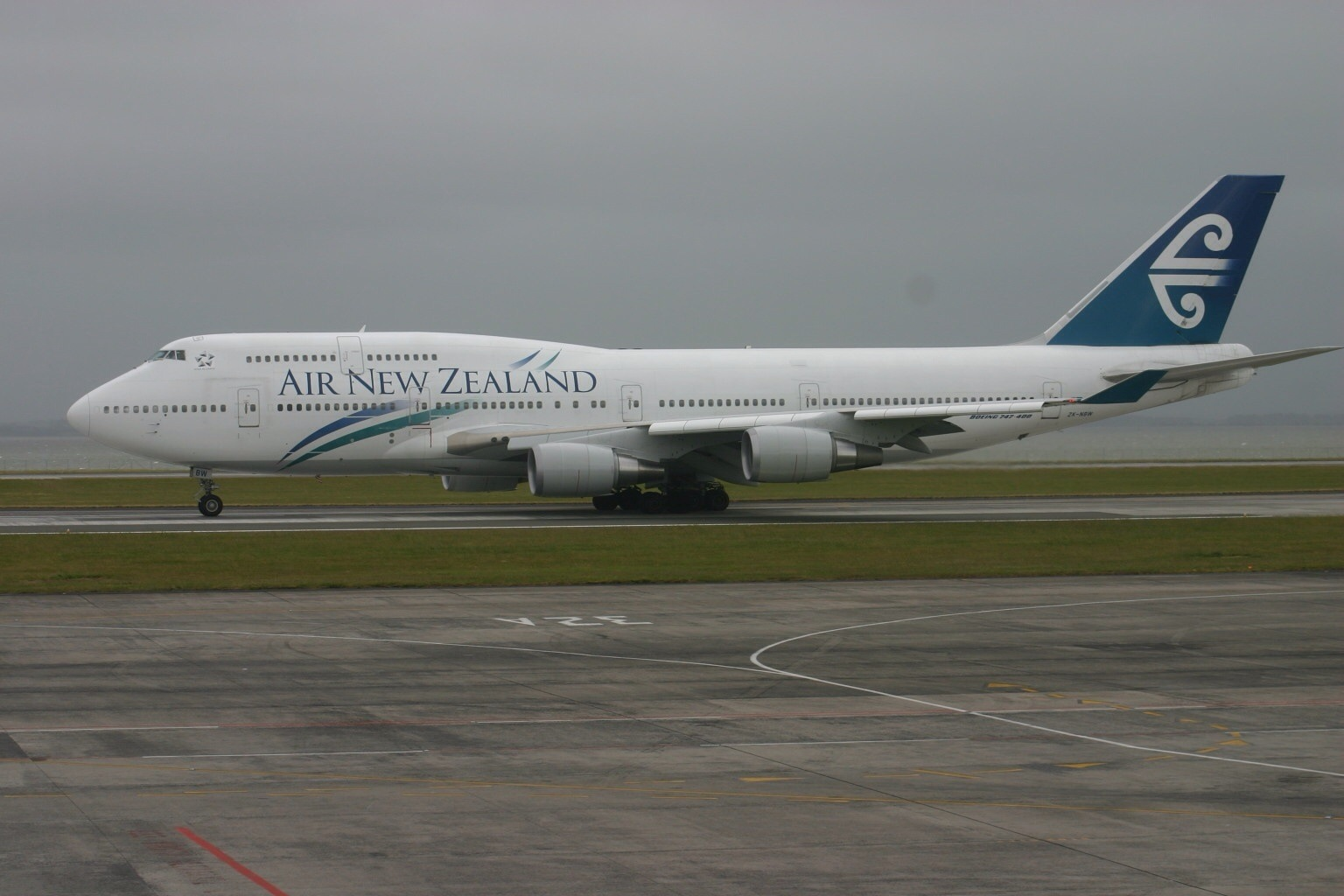
Boeing 747-400

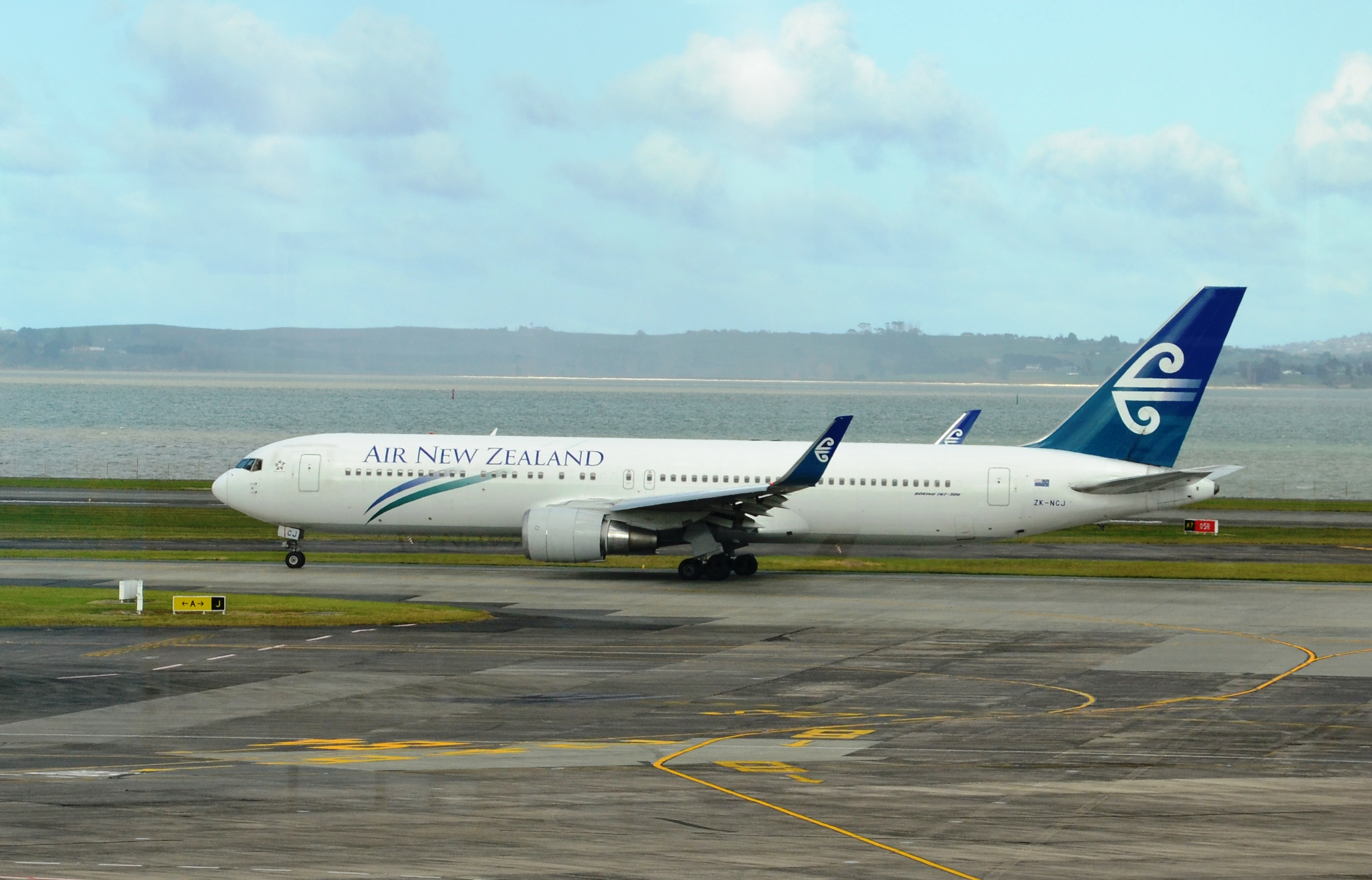
Boeing 767-300ER

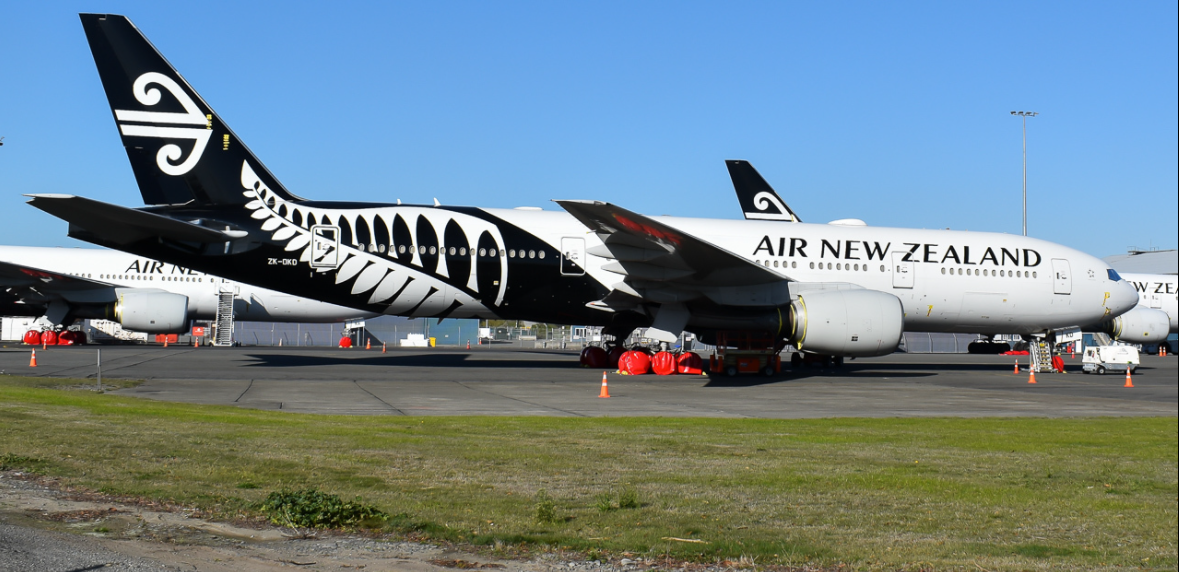
Boeing 777-200ER

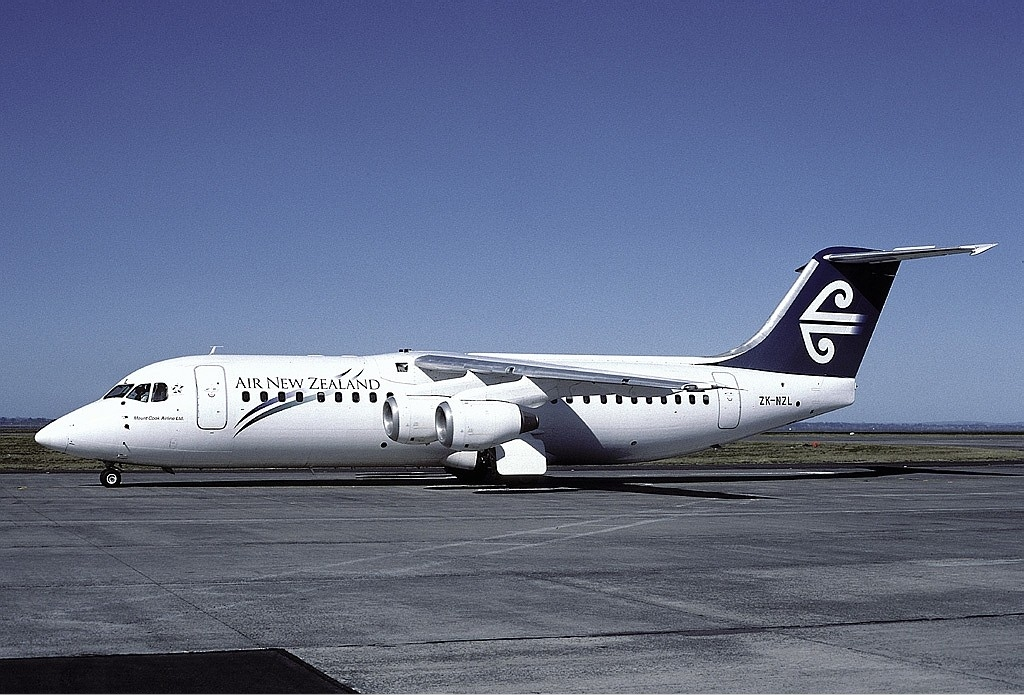
BAe 146-300

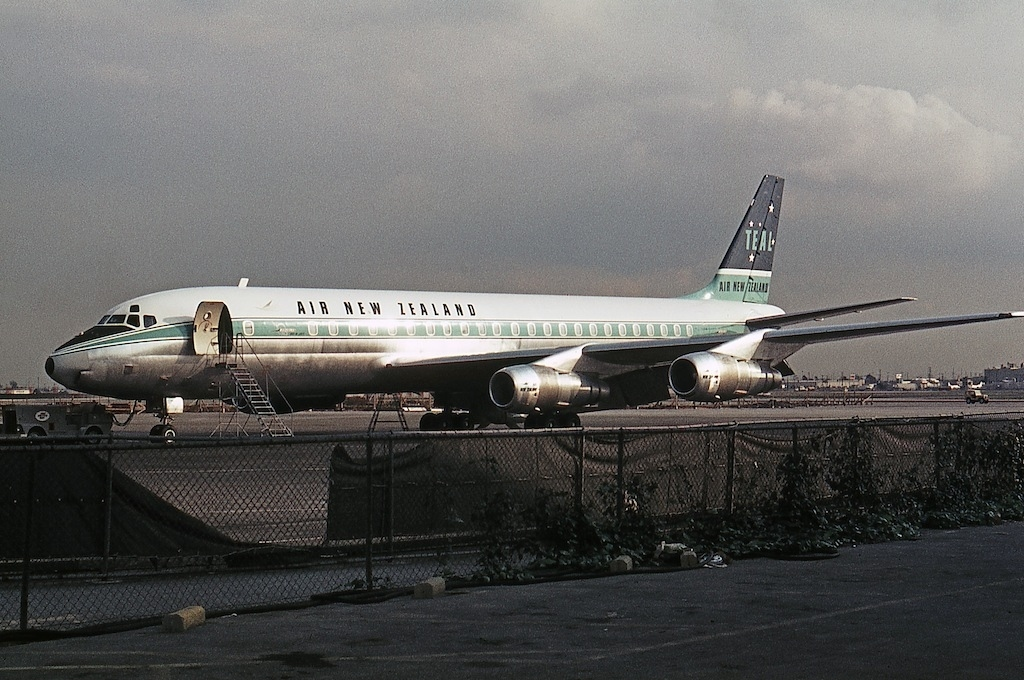
Douglas DC-8-52

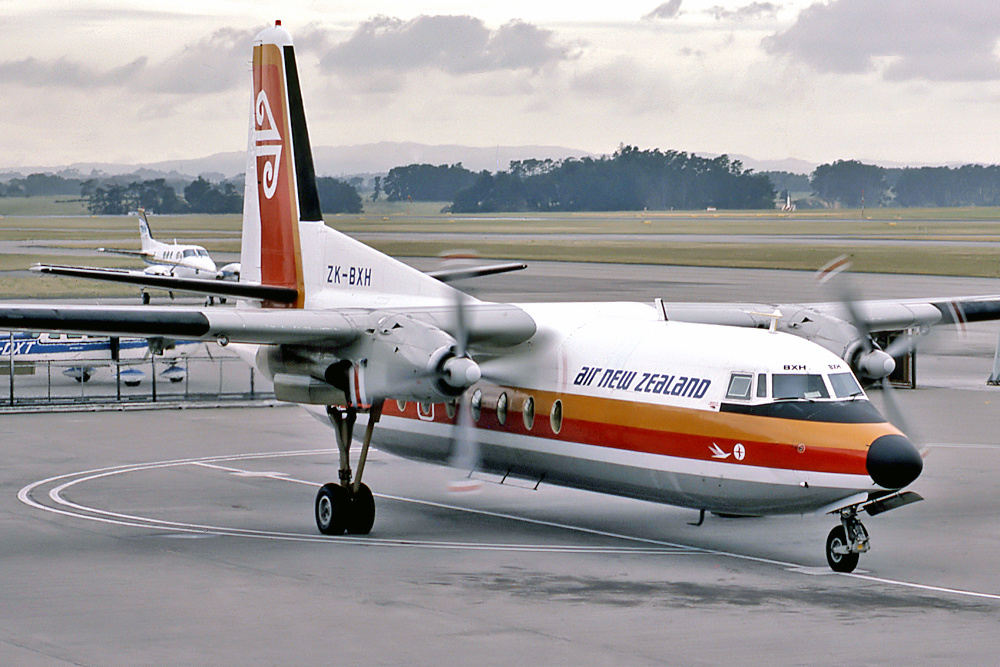
Fokker F-27-100

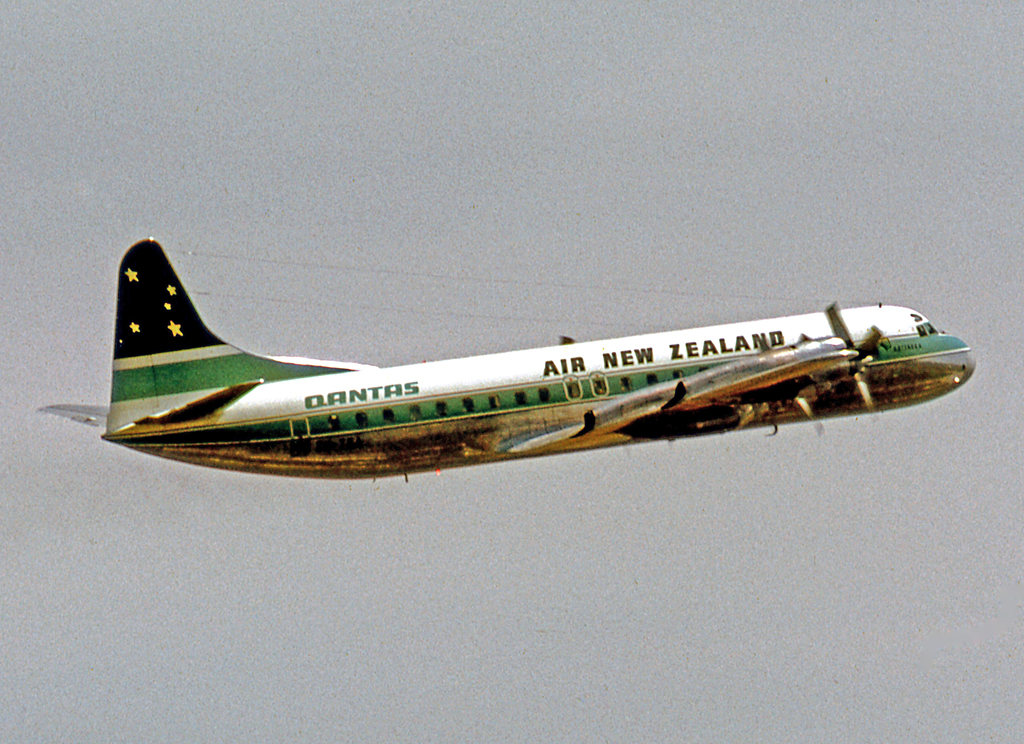
Lockheed L-188 Electra

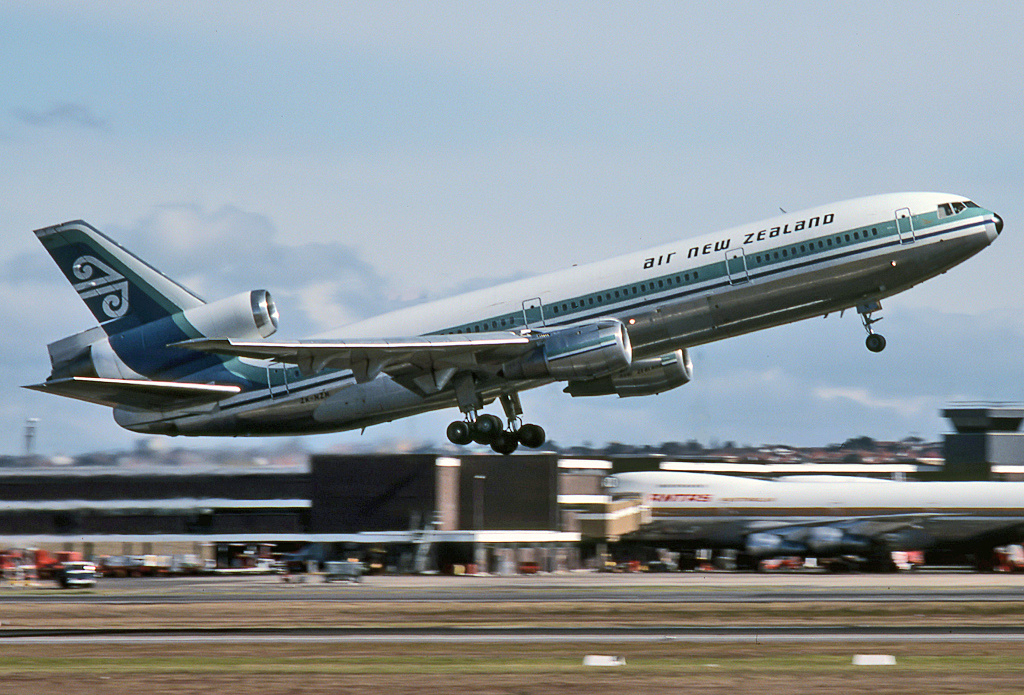
McDonnell Douglas DC-10-30

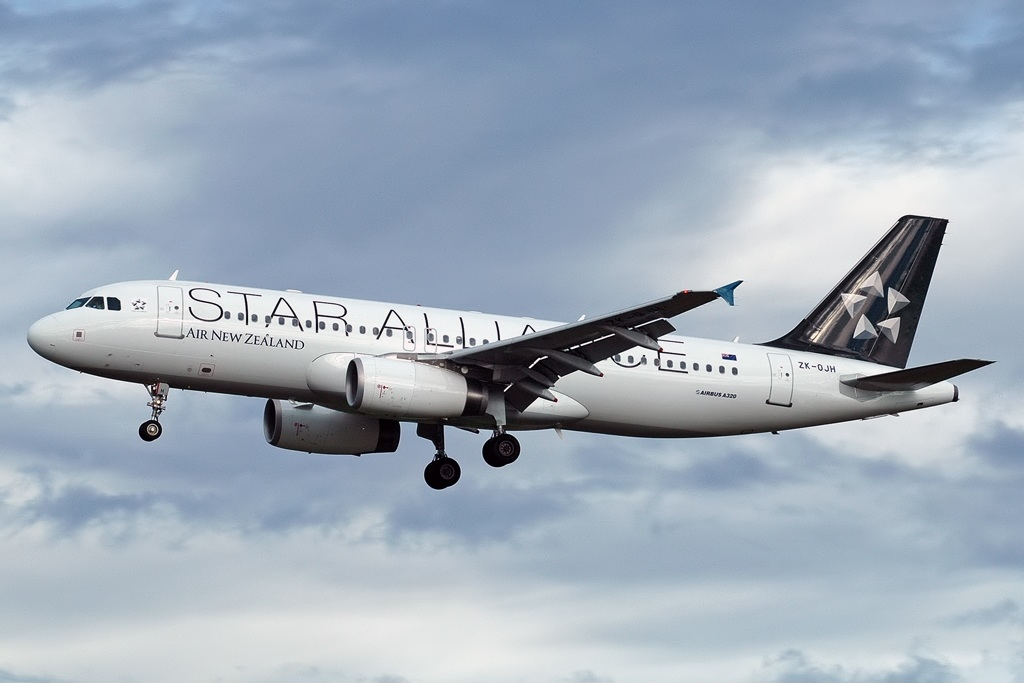
Air New Zealand Short Haul A320

In the past, Air New Zealand has flown the following aircraft (not including aircraft solely operated by TEAL and National Airways Corporation, or aircraft operated solely by Air New Zealand Link subsidiaries).

Air New Zealand historical fleet
Aircraft	Introduced	Retired	Replacement	Notes
ATR 72-500	1999	2020	ATR 72-600	Taken over from Mount Cook Airline
Boeing 737-200	1968	2001	Boeing 737-300	Taken over from NAC
Boeing 737-300	1998	2015	Airbus A320-200	
Boeing 747-200B	1981	2000	Boeing 747-400	One hijacked as Air New Zealand Flight 24, 5 sold to Virgin Atlantic and 1 sold to Atlas Air
Boeing 747-400	1990	2014	Boeing 777-300ER	
Boeing 767-200ER	1985	2005	Airbus A320-200; Boeing 767-300ER	
Boeing 767-300ER	1991	2017	Boeing 787-9	
Boeing 777-200ER	2005	2021	Boeing 787-9	Premature retirement due to COVID-19 pandemic
British Aerospace BAe 146-200	2001	2002	Boeing 737-300	Taken over from Ansett New Zealand
British Aerospace BAe 146-300	2001	2002	Boeing 737-300	Taken over from Ansett New Zealand
Douglas DC-8-52	1965	1981	McDonnell Douglas DC-10-30	One aircraft continued to operate after conversion to DC-8F-54 freighter configuration.
Douglas DC-8F-54	1981	1989	None	Converted from DC-8-52 passenger aircraft
Fokker F27-100 Friendship	1960	1980	Fokker F27-500 Friendship	Taken over from NAC.
Fokker F27-500 Friendship	1975	1990	Boeing 737-300	Some were taken over from NAC. 1 crashed as Air New Zealand Flight 4374.
Lockheed L-188 Electra	1959	1972	Douglas DC-8-52	Taken over from TEAL
McDonnell Douglas DC-10-30	1973	1982	Boeing 747-200B	1 crashed as Flight 901.

=== Fleet at 1 April 1978 ===
The following was the Air New Zealand fleet on 1 April 1978, the day the merged Air New Zealand and National Airways Corporation began operating.

Air New Zealand fleet, 1 April 1978
Aircraft	In service	Notes
Boeing 737-200	8	
Fokker F27-100	13	
Fokker F27-500	4	
Douglas DC-8-52	3	
McDonnell Douglas DC-10-30	8	
Total	36	
