= 2013 New Zealand asset sales referendum =

Non-binding referendum in New Zealand

New Zealand asset sales referendum, 2013
- 22 November – 13 December 2013
- "Do you support the Government selling up to 49 per cent of Meridian Energy, Mighty River Power, Genesis Power, Solid Energy and Air New Zealand?"

Results
Choice	Votes	%
Yes	442,985	32.40%
No	920,188	67.30%
Informal votes	4,167	0.30%
Valid votes	1,367,340	99.88%
Invalid or blank votes	1,585	0.12%
Total votes	1,368,925	100.00%
Registered voters/turnout	3,037,405	45.07%
- Source: Electoral Commission

The 2013 New Zealand asset sales referendum is a citizens-initiated referendum that took place by postal ballot from 22 November 2013 to 13 December 2013. It was on the Fifth National (Key) government's policy to partially privatise four energy-related state-owned enterprises and reducing the government's share in Air New Zealand.

In March 2013, the groups collecting signatures to force the referendum announced that they had achieved enough signatures to comfortably clear the 10% registered voters threshold. However, in May 2013, the clerk of the house announced that the petition was 16,500 signatures short of the number required (308,753), as about 100,000 signatures on the petition were faulty or invalid. The organisers had a further two months to obtain the extra signatures. In September 2013, it was officially confirmed that the added signatures had successfully been collected, with the tally now standing some 18,500 more signatures than required.

The referendum was backed by several prominent New Zealanders, including Dame Anne Salmond, who called it the "only just way" to determine whether asset sales are acceptable.

On 30 September 2013, Prime Minister John Key announced that the referendum would be via postal ballot and would take place between 22 November and 13 December. The cost of the referendum would be $NZ9 million.

John Key said that the Government intended to ignore the results of the referendum, as the 2011 general election gave them a mandate for the sell-off.

The referendum result showed a two to one majority against the proposed asset sales.

== Question ==
The question asked was:

"Do you support the Government selling up to 49% of Meridian Energy, Mighty River Power, Genesis Power, Solid Energy and Air New Zealand?"

== Background ==
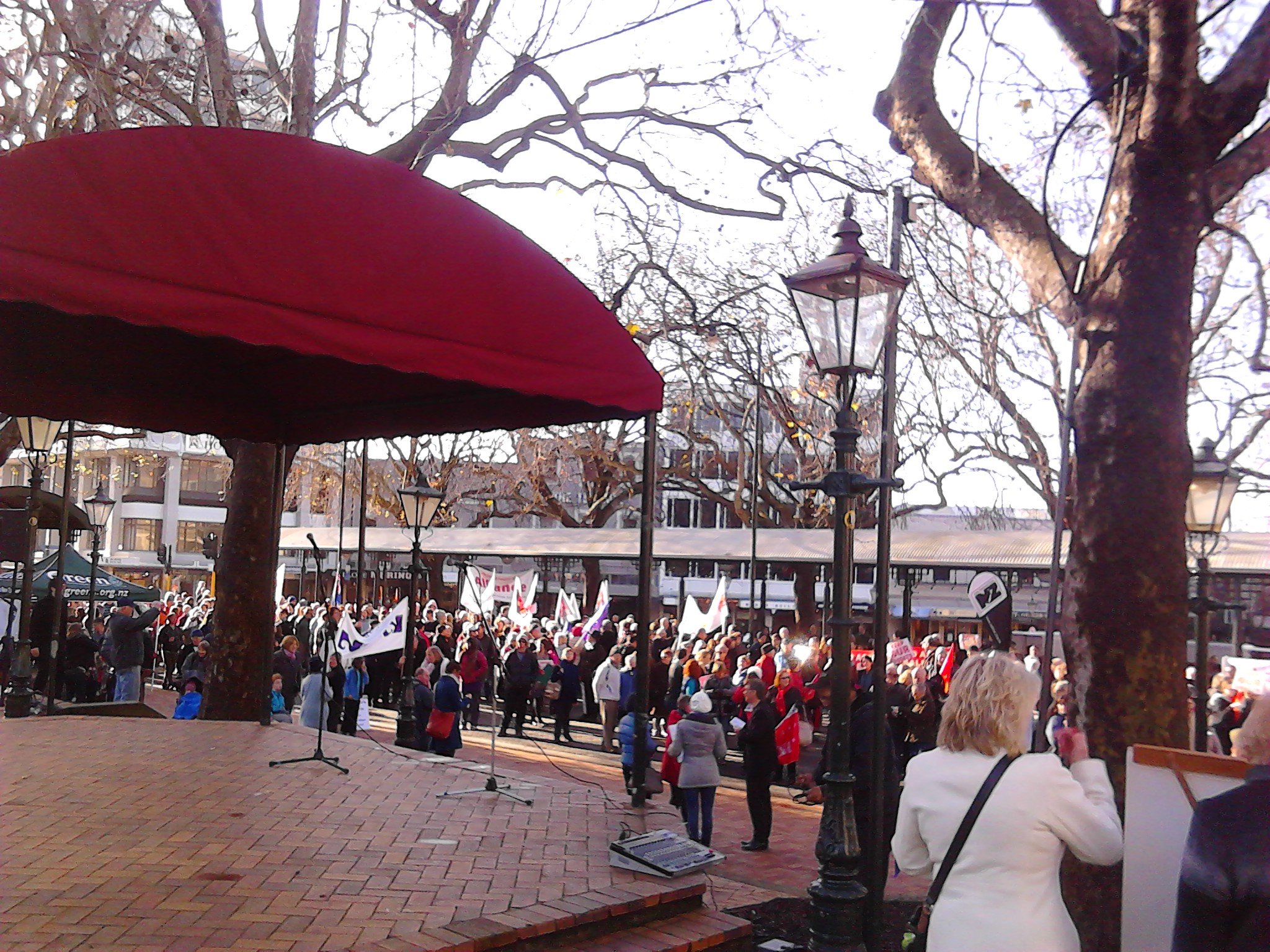
Protest in opposition to the privatisation of state-owned enterprises in Dunedin, June 2012

The National government was re-elected at the 2011 election on a platform of "Mixed Ownership Model" for the five state-owned companies Meridian Energy, Mighty River Power, Genesis Energy, Solid Energy and Air New Zealand, where a minority stake in the companies would be sold off. This policy was opposed by the opposition. A coalition of groups including the Green Party, Grey Power, Council of Trade Unions (CTU), Labour Party, New Zealand Union of Students' Associations (NZUSA), Greenpeace and others started a petition against it in April 2012. The New Zealand Herald argued in an editorial that the Green Party used parliamentary funding to pay people to collect signatures, which while legal broke a long-standing convention about citizen initiated referendums.

By July 2012, it was reported that nearly 200,000 signatures had been collected, of which 100,000 were collected by the Green Party. As a combined initiative, Labour and the Greens issued a protest T-shirt against asset sales in support of the referendum. By early January 2013, the group had collected 340,000 signatures, more than enough to force a referendum; 10% of registered voters or approximately 310,000 signatures are required to force a referendum, although more are generally required to be collected to account for invalid and duplicate signatures. By late February 2013, 391,000 signatures had been collected. On 12 March 2013, the entire 393,000-signature petition was presented to the House.

Holding a referendum separate from an election process is estimated to cost $9 million. Defending this cost, Russel Norman, Greens co-leader, noted that this cost paled in comparison to the (to September 2013) $100 million cost of the asset sales program itself.

== Result ==
The referendum took place by postal ballot, opening on 22 November 2013 and closing on 13 December 2013. 45% of eligible voters took part. Of those, approximately two-thirds voted against asset sales.

Despite the result of this referendum being not in favour of partial asset sales, Prime Minister John Key announced these partial asset sales would continue. He said: "Three in four New Zealanders said no we don't agree with Labour and the Greens. I think it will be a dismal failure from their point of view." He had also gone on to call the referendum "an utter waste of money" as he had no intention of honouring its results, claiming the Government had been re-elected at the 2011 general election partially on the basis of the pending shares sell-off.
