= Bert Mercer =

New Zealand aviator

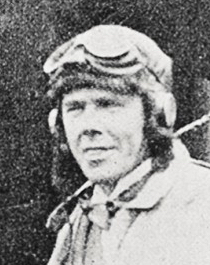
Mercer in 1921

James Cuthbert Mercer (16 September 1886 – 30 June 1944) was a pioneer New Zealand aviator, establishing the country's first commercial airline, Air Travel (NZ) Ltd, in 1934 based around services operating between Hokitika and settlements in South Westland.

== Early life ==
Mercer was born in Dunedin and when he left school, he worked as a bicycle and car mechanic. Mercer learned to fly while working as a mechanic at the Sockburn airport in Christchurch and became the Canterbury Aero Club's first instructor when it formed in 1928.

== Career ==
In 1934 Mercer set up Air Travel (NZ) Ltd, which became the first licensed airline to commence services in New Zealand with its inaugural flight on 18 December from Hokitika. Very shortly after the airline began delivering mail. When the service began operating in 1934 along the West Coast, Mercer used a de Havilland Fox Moth.

== Death and legacy ==
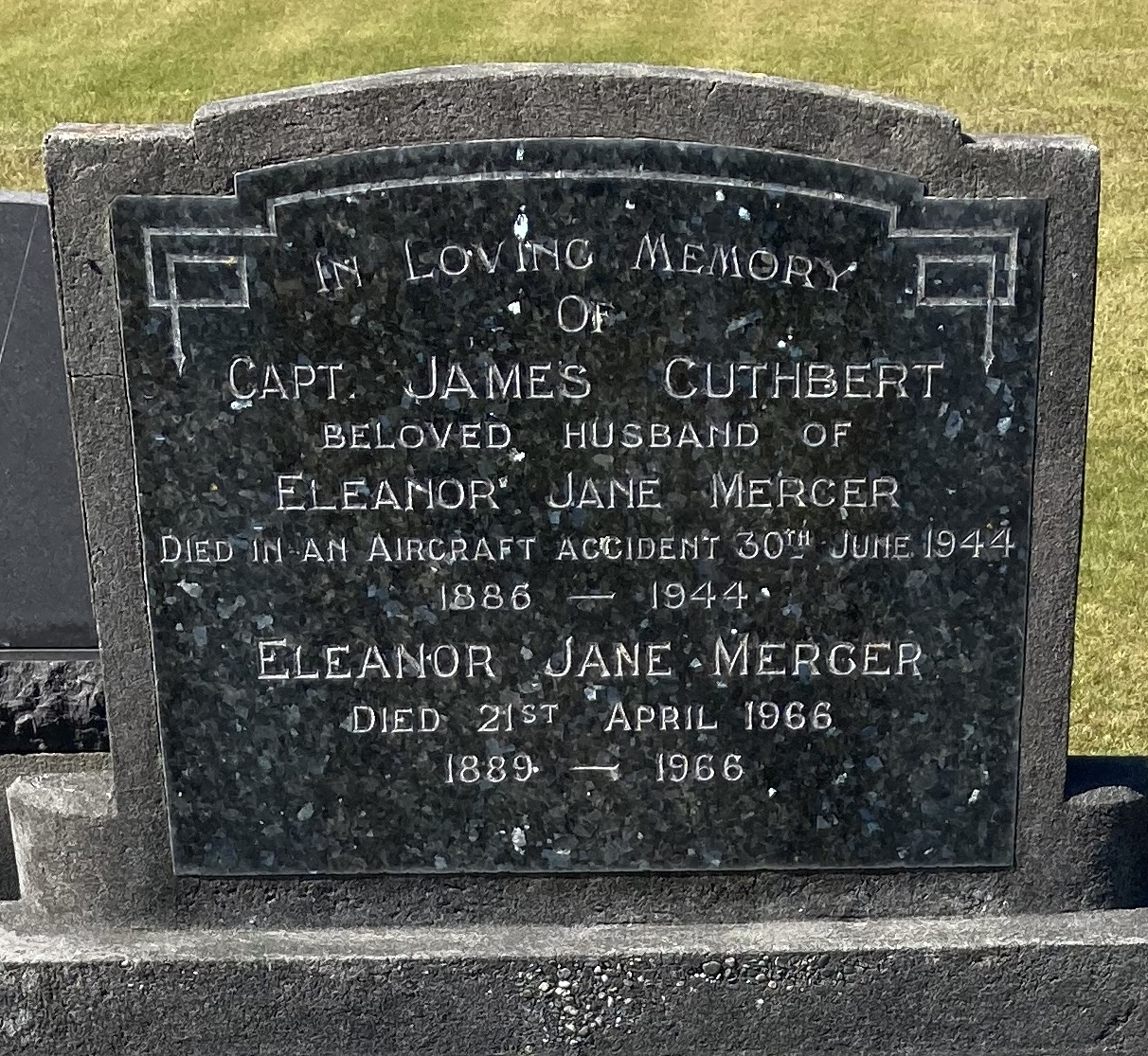
Headstone at Mercer's grave in Hokitika Cemetery

Mercer died in an aircrash in 1944 when the company's de Havilland Dragon ZK-AHT, piloted by Colin Lewis, crashed on Mount Hope of the Two Thumb Range, en route from Nelson to Westport. He is buried in the Hokitika Cemetery. In 1945, Air Travel (NZ) Ltd came under government control but continued until 1967 when the national air carrier NAC began flights into Hokitika. Eleven pilots flew for Air Travel (NZ) Ltd between 1934 and 1947.
