= Air Travel (NZ) Ltd =

Airline in Hokitika, New Zealand

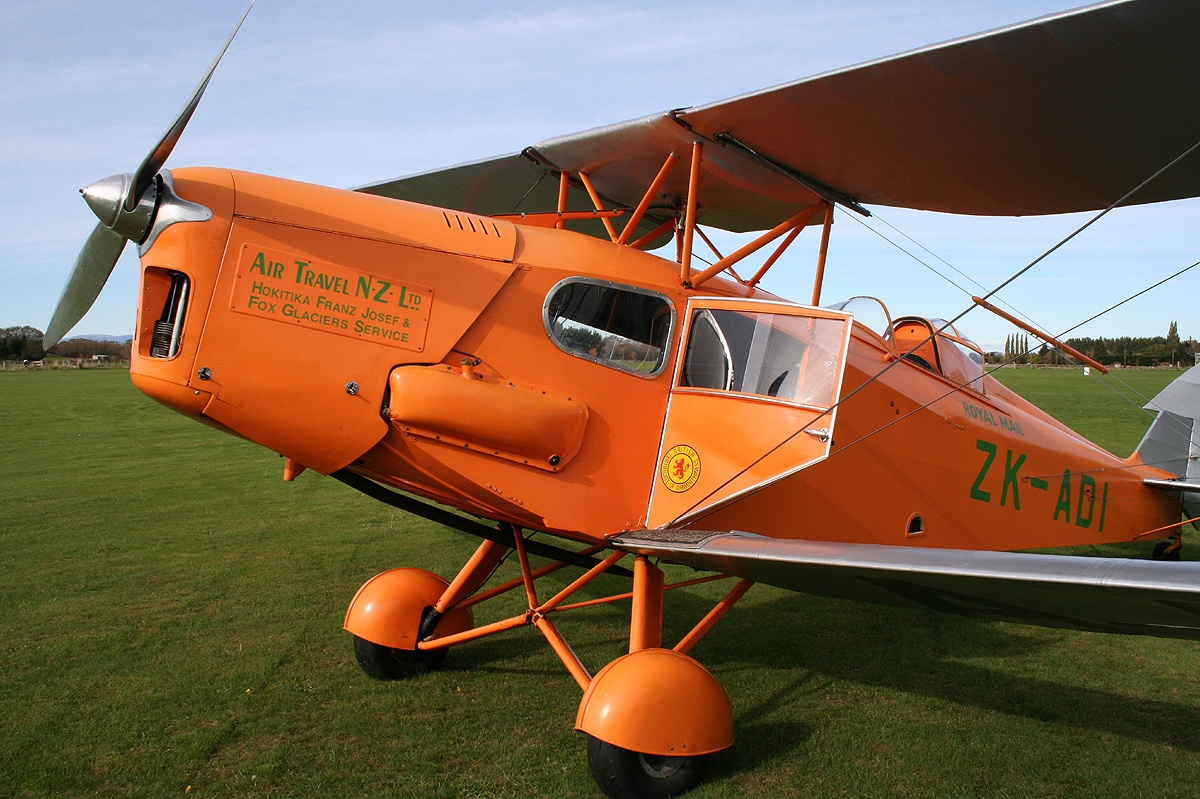
De Havilland DH-83 Fox Moth ZK ADI, their first aircraft

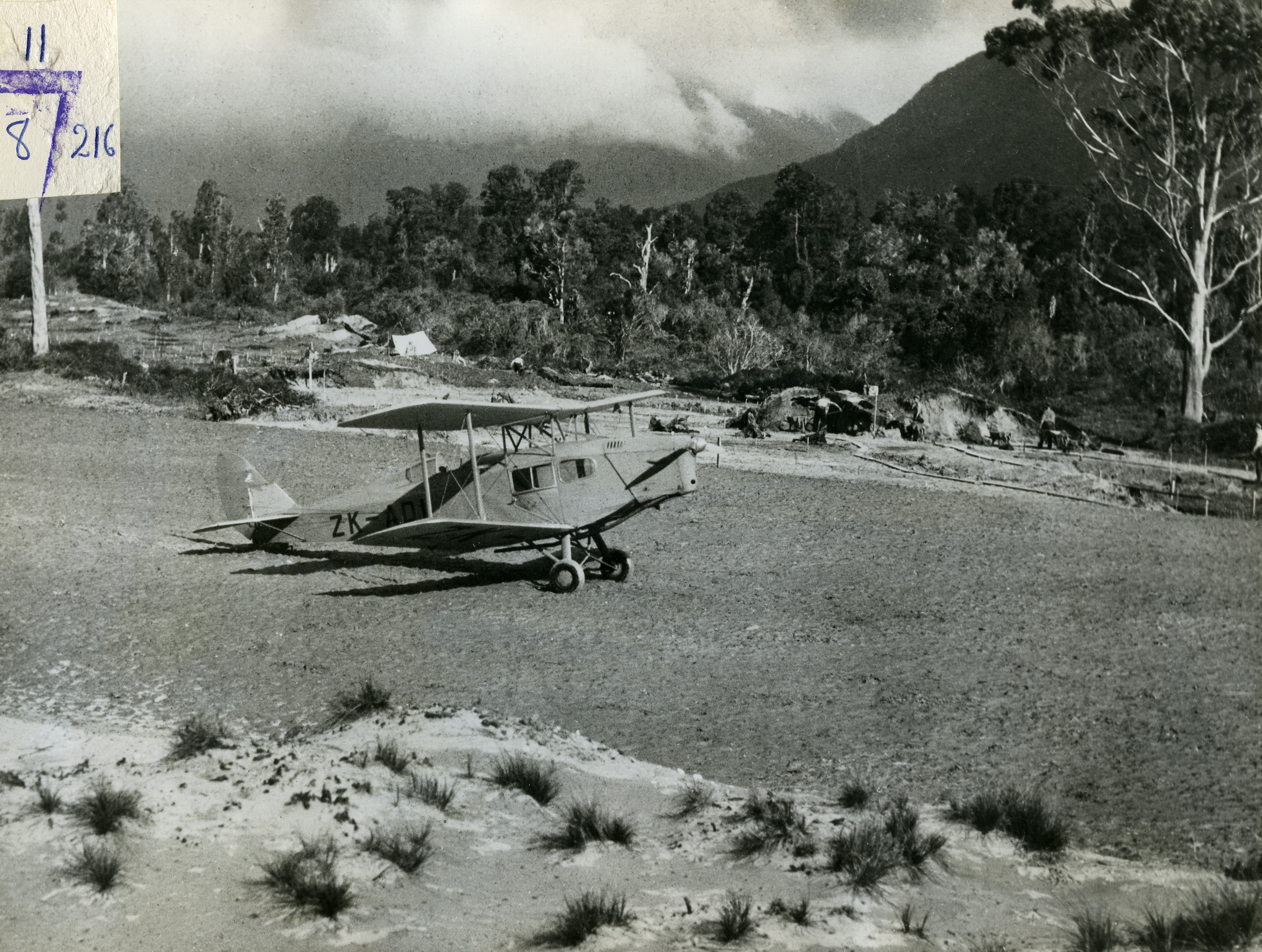
ZK ADI in the 1940s

Air Travel (NZ) Limited, a small airline based in Hokitika, was the first airline in New Zealand to fly licensed scheduled air services. They took delivery of their first De Havilland biplane aircraft at the end of 1934 and made it their business to carry passengers, mail and freight to remote parts of the West Coast. Their ambulance services were particularly welcome. They were well known outside their region for taking tourists to the Franz Josef and Fox glaciers.

Immediately following the Second World War all New Zealand's air services were nationalised. The equipment and staff of Air Travel joined those of Union Airways in the new government-owned New Zealand National Airways Corporation but Air Travel's aircraft and their routes kept a separate identity for some long time.

== History ==
Air Travel was the creation of Bert Mercer. Mercer had seen potential for a commercial air service in this region because there were no roads south of Ross and travellers relied on steamers and bullock tracks for access. Air Travel's first scheduled flight took place in Fox Moth ZK ADI on 18 December 1934, from Hokitika to South Westland, and occurred shortly after the airline began delivering mail. In 1945, not long after Mercer died in an air crash, the company came under government control but continued until 1967, when the national air carrier NAC began flights into Hokitika. Eleven pilots flew for Air Travel between 1934 and 1947.

Over the 33 years that Air Travel was in service they operated a number of de Havilland biplanes, including three Fox Moths, two Dragonflies, a Dragon, and a Dragon Rapide, out of Hokitika's Southside Airfield, located on the south side of the Hokitika River. The first flight undertaken by Air Travel was in the De Havilland Fox Moth ZK-ADI, which is still in use. As the service became popular, another Fox Moth, ZK-AEK, was brought into service in 1935. Other aircraft included Dragonfly ZK-AFB (1937), Fox Moth ZK-AGM (1938), Dragonfly ZK-AGP (1938), Dragon ZK-AHT (1944), and Dragon Rapide ZK-AHS (1944). Further aircraft flown by the company included Dominies ZK-AKT, ZK-BAU, and ZK-AKS, which were flown in various liveries.

At first there were 14 landing grounds: Westport, Hokitika, Greymouth, Ross, Wataroa, Franz Josef and Fox glaciers, Karangarua, Jacobs River, Bruce Bay, Haast, Okuru and Upper Okuru. Arawata and Landsborough required further improvement.

There was no other form of transport on its routes so Air Travel's aircraft were not commandeered by the government in September 1939 but took on patrol duties along the remote coastline on behalf of the RNZAF and continued restricted services to the public. By the end of 1945 they were reduced to four aircraft, two Fox Moths, a Rapide and a Dragonfly.

Three Aircraft operated by Air Travel have been involved in accidents, one of which killed Mercer himself. In 1942, Dragonfly ZK-AGP, piloted by Arthur Baines, lost a propeller and ditched into the sea, having just departed Westport en route to Nelson. All four passengers drowned. Newspaper reports of the accident noted that the airline had carried almost 22,500 passengers between 1934 and the end of June 1941.

Fox Moth ZK-AEK, piloted by Ozzie Openshaw, crashed in 1943 while taking four passengers for a scenic flight over Franz Josef Glacier although none of the passengers nor Openshaw was injured. In 1944, Dragon ZK-AHT, piloted by Colin Lewis, crashed on Mount Hope, en route from Nelson to Westport. On board were six passengers, including Bert Mercer and another Air Travel employee, Maurice Dawe, both of whom died.

Two successful anniversaries commemorating Air Travel were held in 1994 and 2009, celebrating the 60th and 75th anniversaries. There have also been a number of books published with details about the company.

== Air Travel (NZ) Limited ==
Head Office - Christchurch. registered 15 May 1934

- Directors:

Henry Worrall, chairman (managing director of Sefton Flour Milling)
J C Mercer, managing (chief pilot to the Canterbury Aero Club)
Paul E L Renton of Hokitika, merchant
H C Newman of Hokitika (managing director of Newman's Motors Limited)

Original shareholders aside from the directors included a number of Franz Josef's Graham family and jeweller, J R Delahunty. Other families involved were: Cron, Nolan and Hende. The Press was a shareholder.

The New Zealand National Airways Act (December) 1945 provided for compulsory acquisition of aircraft and other property held by Air Travel (any holder of an aircraft-service licence at the time the Act was passed) at any time before the end of 1947. New Zealand National Airways Corporation began business on 1 April 1947.

NAC bought the company's shares but operations were not fully absorbed into NAC until 1 October 1947. The final Air Travel flights were in late September 1947. Harry Worrall took charge of Air Travel after Bert Mercer's death and became a foundation director of NAC.

== Fleet ==
Aircraft	Introduced	Retired	Notes
de Havilland Dominie		1947	Three aircraft
de Havilland Dragon	1944		One aircraft
de Havilland Dragonfly	1937		Two aircraft
de Havilland Dragon Rapide	1944	1944	One aircraft
de Havilland Fox Moth	1934	1947	Three aircraft

== See also ==
- List of defunct airlines of New Zealand
- History of aviation in New Zealand
