= Disappearance of Dragonfly ZK-AFB =

Missing aircraft

On 12 February 1962, a de Havilland DH.90 Dragonfly (ZK-AFB) departed from Christchurch Airport (NZCH/CHC), New Zealand, on a scenic flight to Milford Sound and return. Despite considerable search efforts, including being the subject of recent Search and Rescue (SAR) training exercises, not a single piece of confirmed wreckage has been found.

== Background ==
ZK-AFB was owned and operated by Air Charter, a small charter airline mainly conducting scenic flights, tourist transfer and parachuting operations, established by former Royal Air Force pilot and aircraft engineer Brian Chadwick in the late 1950s after emigrating to New Zealand from the United Kingdom.

On the morning of 12 February 1962, ZK-AFB departed Christchurch Airport with Chadwick (47) and four passengers on board for a scenic flight to Milford Sound and return via Queenstown. The passengers were Louis Rowan (25), honeymooning couple Elwyn & Valerie Saville (20 & 22, respectively), and Darrell Shields (33). When the flight failed to arrive at Milford Sound, the largest aerial search in the history of New Zealand began.

== Search effort ==
=== Original search ===
30 minutes after the expected arrival time of approximately 12:30 pm, staff at the Milford Sound Flight Service Station sent an overdue flight notification to the Christchurch Area Control Centre, which started a full-scale multi-agency search. The initial search consisted of 34 aircraft over 400 flying hours in 167 sorties, covering an area of over 44,000 square kilometres (17,000 square miles).

=== Recent search efforts ===
Several public and private searches have been carried out over the decades since the disappearance. Hawke's Bay pilot Gavin Grimmer has been searching for ZK-AFB for nearly 20 years, both by air and on foot.

The Reeve family of Kaiapoi have been looking for the missing Dragonfly regularly since 2008, including five major expeditions with Land Rovers, metal detectors, and other search equipment.

NZ Police and NZ Search and Rescue (NZSAR) have searched for ZK-AFB several times in formal training exercises, designated "Operation Dragonfly".

Several items of interest have been found in the general area that ZK-AFB is theorised to have crashed in, including a woman's boot in 2015 and, more recently, a fabric harness and section of carpet, however, no evidence has ever been found that has been definitively linked to the aircraft or the persons on board. In February 2022, a gathering was held at the Canterbury Aero Club to mark 60 years since the disappearance.

== In popular culture ==
=== Film ===
White Bus Family Productions (the Reeve family) intend to create a film documenting their search efforts, however, as of July 2026, this is yet to be released.

Where is the Dragonfly? New Zealand's aviation mystery - a 2024 short film released on YouTube by ABC News Australia.

=== Books ===
LOST... without trace? by Richard Waugh, son of Brian Waugh, a personal friend of Chadwick.

TRACED ...yet still missing! by Gavin Grimmer.

An account of the disappearance of ZK-AFB was featured in Missing! Aircraft Missing in New Zealand 1928-2000 by Chris Rudge.

=== Other ===
The Last Flight of the Dragonfly - a 2023 podcast released as part of NZ digital news outlet Stuff's The Long Read series.
