= De Havilland Fox Moth =

1930s British light biplane

DH.83 Fox Moth
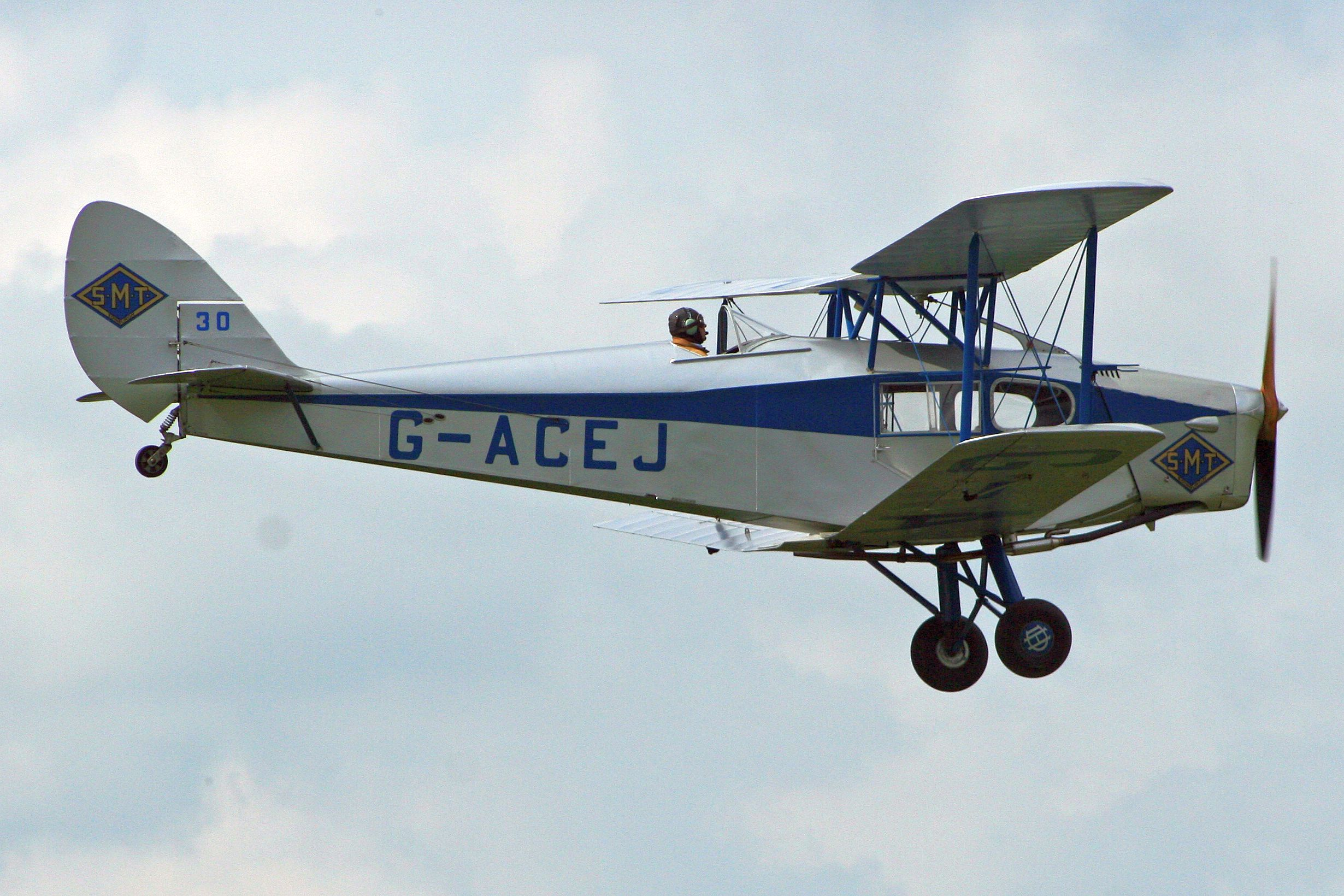
- Fox Moth in flight at Fenland Airfield (2012)

General information
- Type: Passenger aircraft
- Manufacturer: de Havilland
- Designer: A.E. Hagg
- Number built: 155

History
- Introduction date: 1932
- First flight: 29 January 1932

The DH.83 Fox Moth is a small biplane passenger aircraft from the 1930s powered by a single de Havilland Gipsy Major I inline inverted engine, manufactured by the de Havilland Aircraft Company.

The aircraft was designed late in 1931 as a low-cost, light passenger aircraft. Many components, including the engine, tailplane, fin, rudder, and wings were identical to those of the de Havilland DH.82 Tiger Moth, then being built in large quantities. These were fitted to a purpose-built fuselage, which had a plywood covering over longerons that were made of ash forward of the pilot and Sitka spruce aft. The pilot sat in a raised cockpit behind the small enclosed passenger cabin, which was usually fitted with three seats for short-range flights. The "Speed Model" was fitted with a canopy and fairing. The wings could also be folded for storage.

== Operational history ==
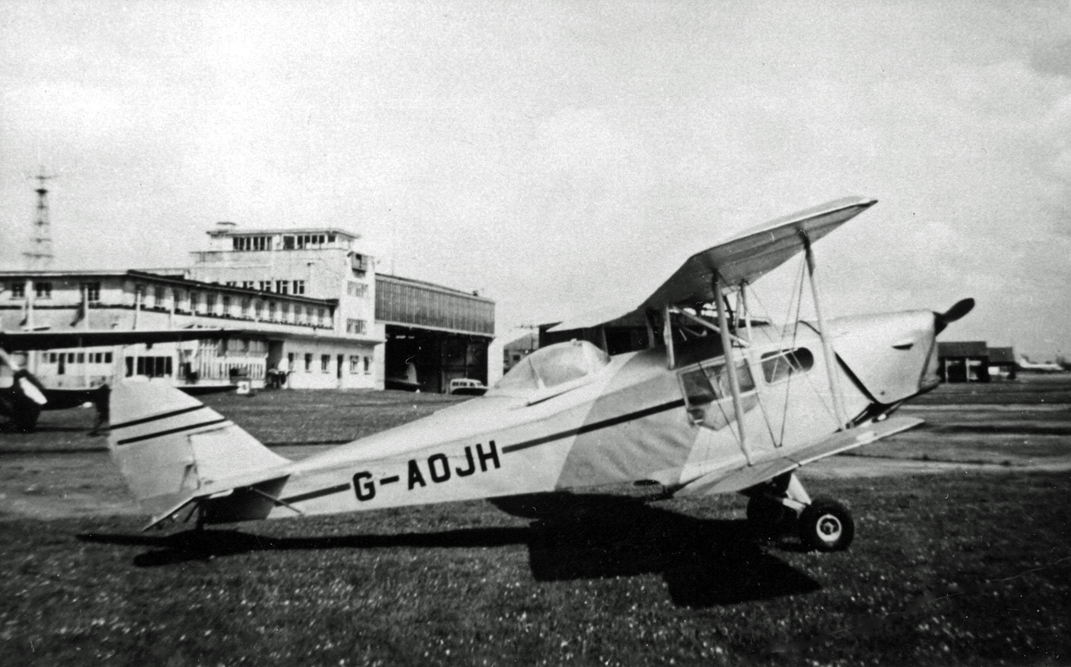
Canadian-built DH.83C Fox Moth with canopy fitted to pilot's position at Manchester (Ringway) Airport in 1955

The prototype first flew on 29 January 1932 and was sent to Canada, gaining sufficient interest that seven were assembled at the company's Toronto plant. "Home" based production was shared evenly between sales within the United Kingdom and exports, with 49 aircraft each going onto the British register and being sent overseas. British-based aircraft were mostly used on short-haul joyrides or as feeder flights around the British Isles. The DH.83 Fox Moth was the first aircraft to earn a profit in commercial airline service without subsidies.

Fox Moth VH-UQM Miss Currie was purchased by Victor Holyman for £1,450 and began operating on the 108-mile route over the Southeastern Bass Strait between Launceston, Tasmania and Whitemark on Flinders Island in October 1932. It was thus the inaugural aircraft of what was to later become Australian National Airways. Qantas used Fox Moths to replace de Havilland DH.50s on Royal Flying Doctor Service services.

Total production of the DH.83/DHC.83C Fox Moth was 153; 98 in England, two in Australia, and 53 in Canada after WWII. A number of different engines were used, including the 130 hp (97 kW) Gipsy IIIA on most British-built aircraft and the 145 hp (108 kW) Gipsy Major 1C on the 53 postwar DH.83C Canadian-built aircraft. The DHC-83Cs were fitted with larger pilot cockpit openings, a larger windscreen and canopy, a large ambulance cabin door on the port side to accommodate a stretcher and did not have folding wings. The DH.83C used DH.82 Tiger Moth main and tail landing gear. The DH.83C was an excellent and economical bush plane.

== Variants ==
- DH.83 Fox Moth: Light transport biplane; 98 built in the United Kingdom, plus two more in both Australia and Canada.
- DH.83C Fox Moth: 53 aircraft were built in Canada after World War II.
- Gasuden KR-1/Tokyo Gasu Denki: This was an unlicensed Japanese-built copy of the Fox Moth powered by a 150 hp (110 kW) Gasuden Jimpu 3, a 7 cylinder radial engine. The first prototype, J-BBJI named Chidorigo (Plover), flew on 23 December 1933. Seven KR-1s were built.
- Gasuden/Tokyo Gasu Denki KR-2: The KR-1 was extensively redesigned with new, unswept sesquiplane wings with rounded wingtips and other modifications as the KR-2.
- I3H: Brazilian Navy designation of the DH.83.

== Operators ==
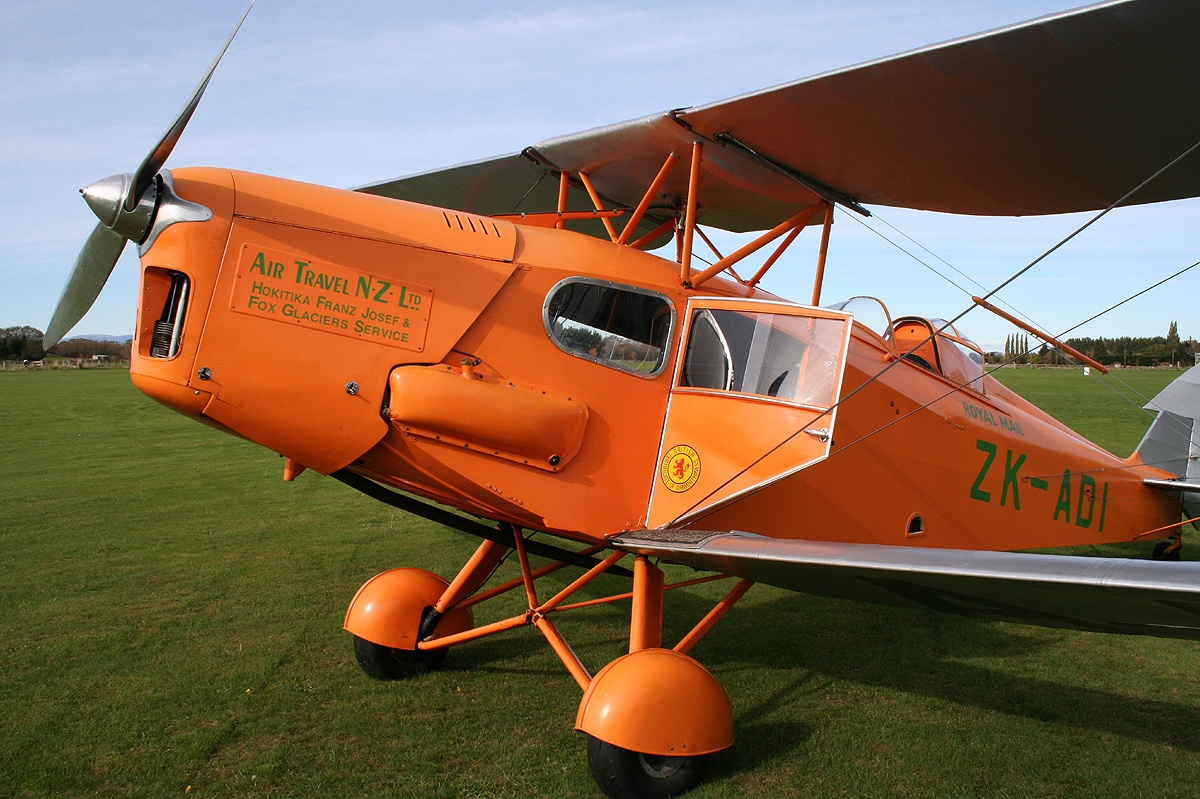
ZK ADI, Air Travel (NZ) 1934

=== Military ===
Australia

- Royal Australian Air Force

Brazil

- Brazilian Air Force
- Brazilian Naval Aviation

Canada

- Royal Canadian Air Force

New Zealand

- Royal New Zealand Air Force
  - No. 42 Squadron RNZAF

South Africa

- South African Air Force

Spain

- Spanish Republican Air Force

Spanish State

- Spanish Air Force

United Kingdom

- Fleet Air Arm

Yugoslavia

- Royal Yugoslav Air Force

=== Civilian ===
Australia

- Adastra Airlines
- Tasmanian Aerial Services

British Raj

- Tata Airlines

Canada

- Wardair Canada

New Zealand

- Air Travel (NZ) Ltd, later National Airways Corporation operated three aircraft.

United Kingdom

- Blackpool and West Coast Air Services
- Giro Aviation
- Hillman's Airways
- Midland & Scottish Air Ferries
- North West Air Services
- Northern & Scottish Airways
- Olley Air Service
- Provincial Airways
- Scottish Motor Traction

Yugoslavia

- Aeroput

== Surviving aircraft ==
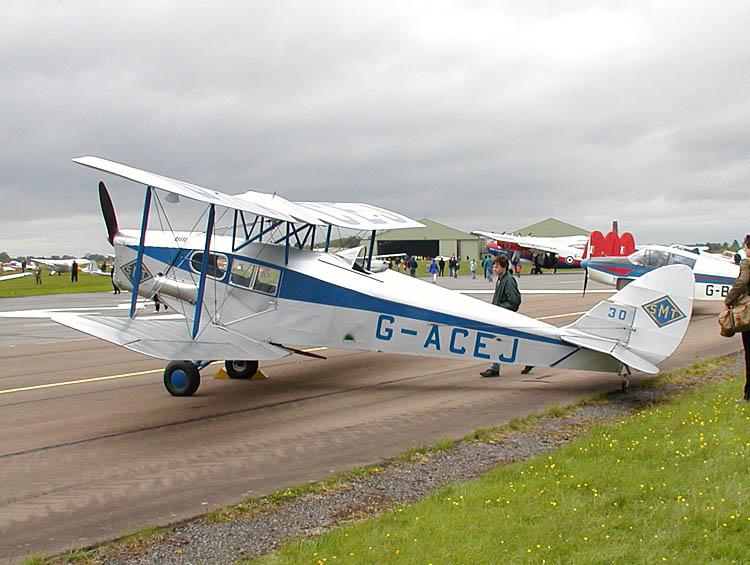
de Havilland Fox Moth G-ACEJ which is now operating out of Germany

- DH.83 G-ACEJ was active in the UK in 2010, but since 2015 has been operating in Germany, it was cancelled from the UK Register in 2024 as exported to Germany. The aircraft received attention in the 1957 British Transport Films production Holiday, taking off from Southport Beach whilst undergoing pleasure flights.
- DH.83C G-AOJH
- ZK-ADI active in New Zealand in 2016
- ZK-AGM active in New Zealand in 2019 after rebuild in UK
- ZK-APT active in New Zealand in 2019
- ZK-AQB active in New Zealand in 2020
- DH.83 VH-UJJ ex-G-ACEB active in Australia in 2009
- C-FYPM ex-ZK-AEK active in Canada in 2018
- VH-UVL active in Australia in 2018
- C-FDIX Under restoration to airworthy condition at Buffalo Airways by Buffalo Joe McBryan and the PLANE SAVERS! crew in Yellowknife, NWT, Canada with the aim of having it flying by the spring of 2020.
- VH-UUS Under restoration at MothCair by Greg Challinor, Murwillumbah NSW, Australia

== Specifications (DH.83) ==
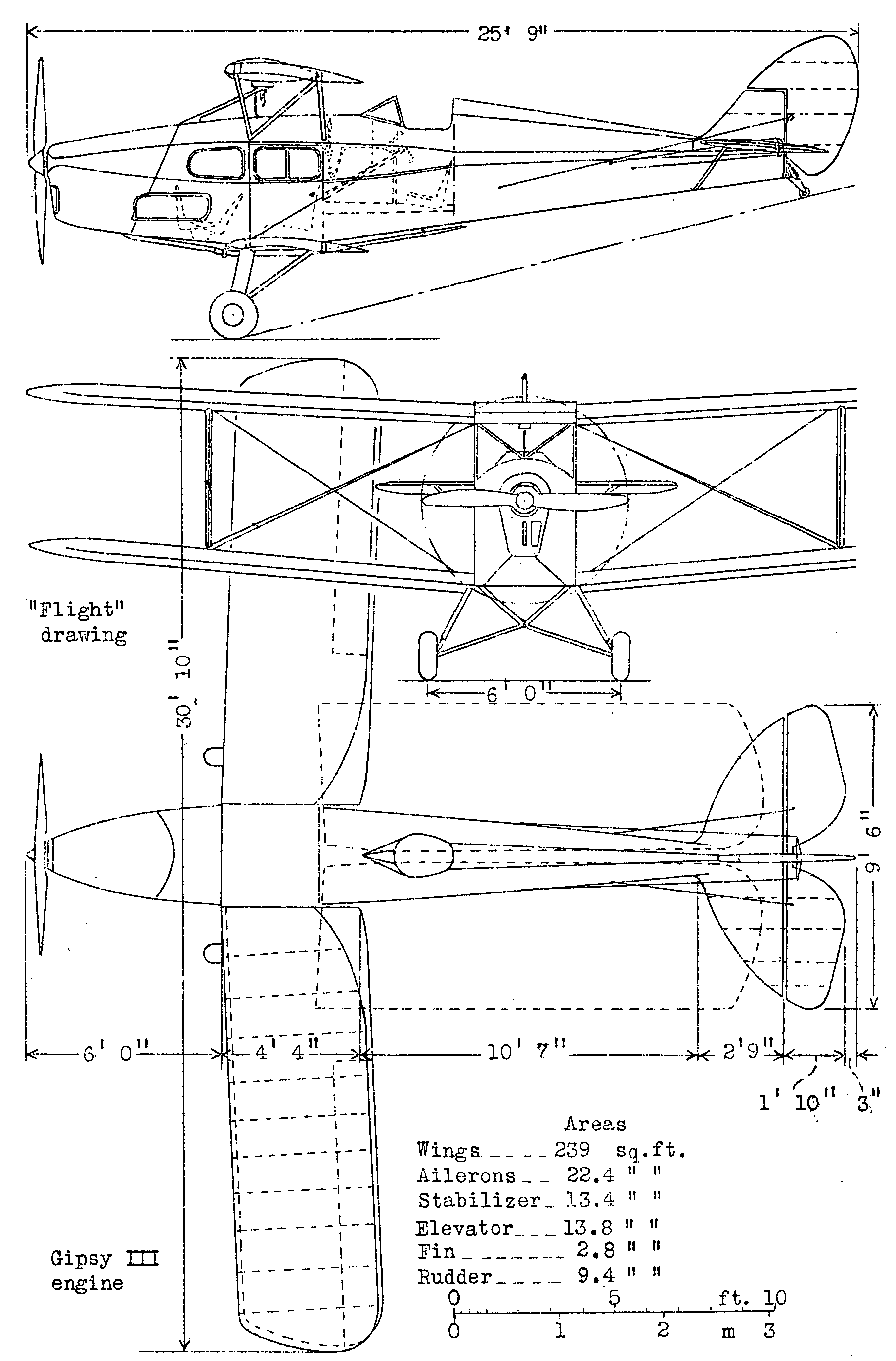
De Havilland DH.83 3-view drawing from NACA-AC-162

Data from De Havilland Aircraft since 1909

General characteristics

- Crew: 1
- Capacity: 3-4
- Length: 25 ft 9 in (7.85 m)
- Wingspan: 30 ft 10 5/8 in (9.41 m)
- Height: 8 ft 9 1/2 in (2.68 m)
- Wing area: 261.5 sq ft (24.29 m^{2})
- Airfoil: RAF 15
- Empty weight: 1,071 lb (486 kg)
- Max takeoff weight: 2,000 lb (907 kg)
- Powerplant: 1 × de Havilland Gipsy III 4-cylinder air-cooled inverted in-line piston engine, 120 hp (89 kW)
- Propellers: 2-bladed fixed-pitch propeller

Performance

- Maximum speed: 106 mph (171 km/h, 92 kn)
- Cruise speed: 91 mph (146 km/h, 79 kn)
- Range: 425 mi (684 km, 369 nmi)
- Service ceiling: 12,700 ft (3,900 m)
- Rate of climb: 450 ft/min (2.3 m/s)

== See also ==
Aircraft of comparable role, configuration, and era

- Letov Š-19

Related lists

- List of aircraft of the Spanish Republican Air Force

== Bibliography ==
- Arthur, Robin (1992). "Pre-War Airliner Fleets: I. Hillman's Airways Ltd". Archive. No. 1. Air-Britain. pp. 23–24. ISSN 0262-4923.
- Fillmore, Malcolm (Autumn 2011). "The Whole Truth: The DH.83 Fox Moth: Part 1". Air-Britain Archive. No. 3. pp. 103–120. ISSN 0262-4923.
- Hotson, Fred W. The de Havilland Canada Story. Toronto: CANAV Books, 1983. ISBN 0-07-549483-3.
- Jackson, A.J. British Civil Aircraft 1919-1972: Volume II. London: Putnam (Conway Maritime Press), 1988. ISBN 0-85177-813-5.
- Jackson, A.J. De Havilland Aircraft since 1909. London: Putnam, (Third ed.)1987. ISBN 0-85177-802-X.
- Mikesh, Robert C. and Shorzoe Abe. Japanese Aircraft 1910-1941. London: Putnam, 1988. ISBN 0-85177-840-2.
- Milberry, Larry. Aviation In Canada. Toronto: McGraw-Hill Ryerson Ltd., 1979. ISBN 0-07-082778-8.
- Molson, Ken M. and Harold A. Taylor. Canadian Aircraft Since 1909. Stittsville, Ontario: Canada's Wings, Inc., 1982. ISBN 0-920002-11-0.
