= De Havilland Dragonfly =

British biplane introduced in 1936

DH.90 Dragonfly
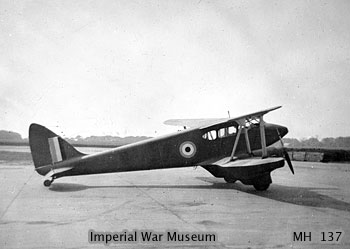
- Former Anglo European Airways Dragonfly impressed into wartime service at RAF Gosport

General information
- Type: Light Transport
- Manufacturer: de Havilland Aircraft Company
- Number built: 67

History
- Manufactured: 1936–1938
- Introduction date: 1936
- First flight: 12 August 1935

The de Havilland DH.90 Dragonfly is a 1930s British twin-engined luxury touring biplane built by the de Havilland Aircraft Company at Hatfield Aerodrome.

== Development ==
The Dragonfly shares a clear family resemblance with the Dragon Rapide, but is smaller and has higher aspect ratio, slightly sweptback wings. The lower wing has a shorter span than the upper, unlike the DH.89, and the top of the engine nacelles protrude much less above its surface because the fuel tank had been moved to the lower centre section. Structurally, too they are different: the Dragonfly had a new preformed plywood monocoque shell and strengthened fuselage. It was designed as a luxury touring aircraft for four passengers and a pilot, with provision for dual controls. The first aircraft, G-ADNA, first flew on 12 August 1935. The Dragonfly achieved maximum performance on low power, by using the new construction methods developed for the de Havilland Comet racer, and therefore was expensive to buy (£2,650). In modern terms, it was an executive transport, aimed at wealthy private individuals, often via the companies they owned.

== Operational history ==
The first delivery was made in May 1936. Some 36 new-build Dragonflies went to private and company owners, about 15 to airlines/air taxis and three to clubs. Two each went to the Danish and Swedish air forces, and the Royal Canadian Mounted Police had four to combat rum-runners. Production ended in 1938.

By 1939, several aircraft had moved from private to commercial use, like the fleet built up by Air Dispatch Ltd at Croydon Airport, headed by Mrs Victor Bruce. Amongst her seven examples were also some ex-airline machines. They were used as air taxis between the various London airports, and also as Army Cooperation night flying trainers. Western Airways of Weston-super-Mare Airport used its Dragonfly on a scheduled service via Birmingham to Manchester.

Seven airframes were shipped to Canada, and erected by de Havilland Canada, where they served a variety of small commercial operators, the R.C.M.P. and two with the Royal Canadian Air Force. At least one, CF-BFF, was fitted with Edo floats, and used commercially.

In about 1937, three Dragonflies were bought by the Romanian government for crew training, appearing on their civil register.

At the start of World War II, about 23 Dragonflies were impressed into the R.A.F and Commonwealth air forces, some six surviving to 1945. Overall, there were about thirteen flying in that year.

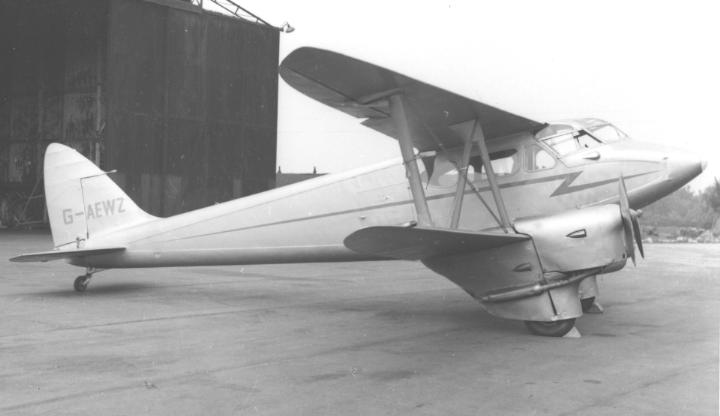
Dragonfly used by Silver City Airways as an executive transport in 1953

Silver City Airways operated a Dragonfly G-AEWZ as an executive transport from 1950 until 1960. By around 1970, only the two survivors noted below were active. In May 2018 Hertfordshire-based Uno bus named a fleet of buses after the Dragonfly plane.

The fuel tanks in the Dragonfly are in the thickened lower centre-section, not immediately behind the engines as in the Dragon Rapide. As a result, only one aircraft was lost to fire. A common cause of loss was the frequent development of a vicious ground loop either on takeoff or landing, resulting in undercarriage writeoff and spar damage.

== Variants ==
- DH.90 : First prototype only. Two 130 hp (97 kW) de Havilland Gipsy Major I
- DH.90A : Two 142 hp (106 kW) de Havilland Gipsy Major 1C or D (postwar, essentially identical) or the earlier, very similar Major II in prewar aircraft.
- Dragonfly Seaplane: the addition of aluminium floats, strengthened attachment points, an extra cabin door and a wing walkway, increased the empty weight to 3,110 lb (1,410 kg) and lowered the maximum speed to 125 mph (200 km/h)

== Surviving aircraft ==
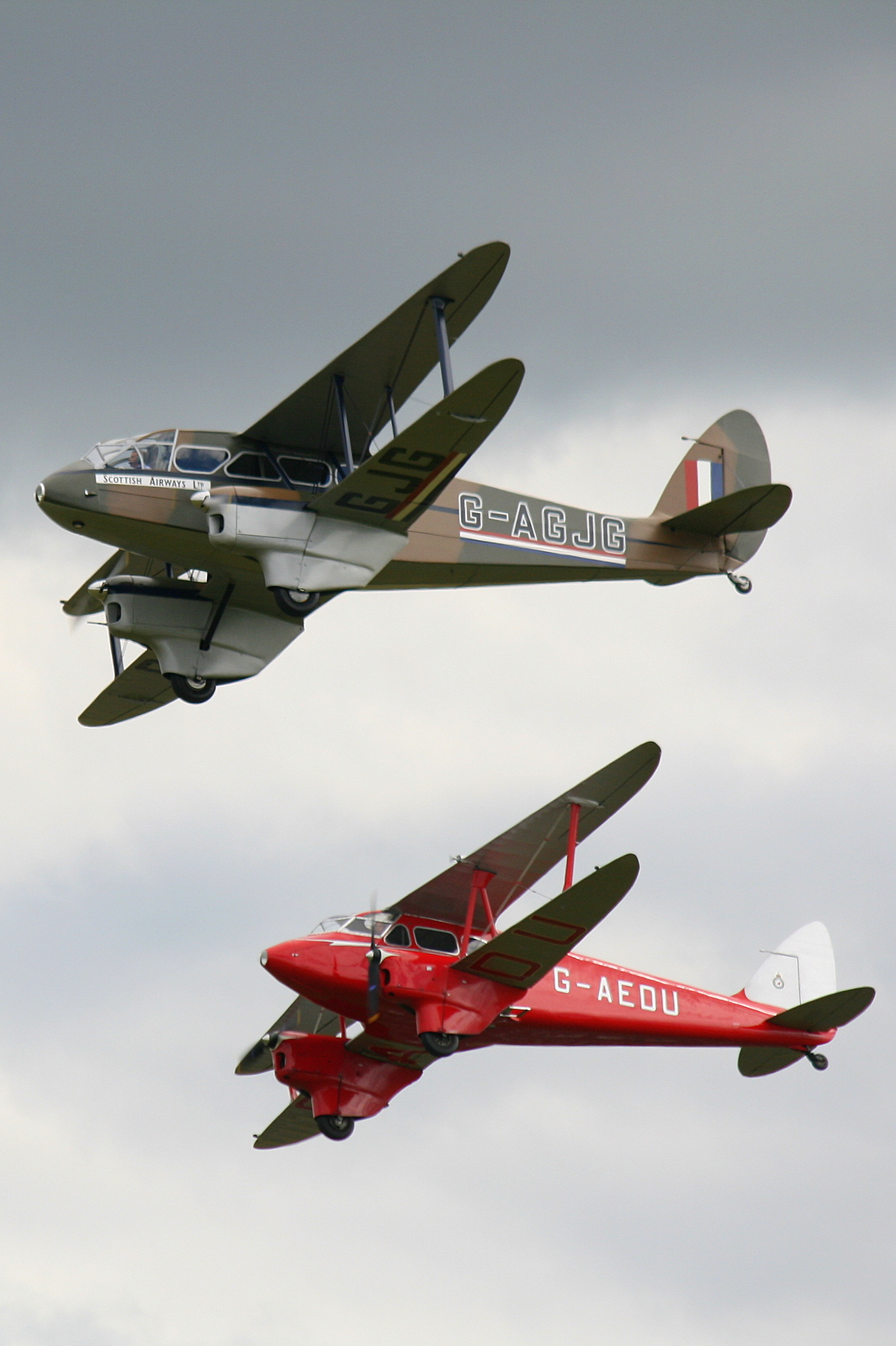
de Havilland DH.89 and DH.90

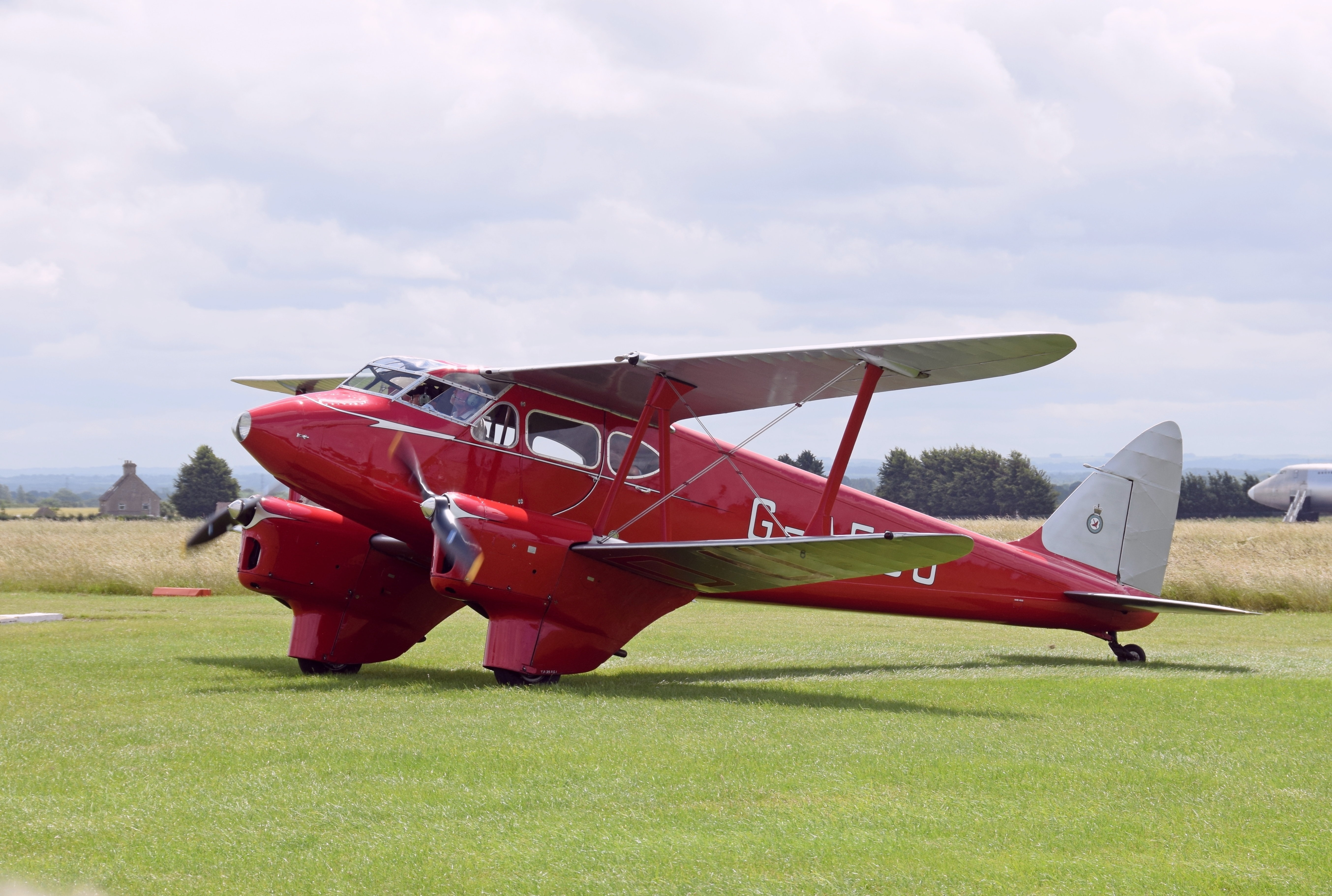
Dragonfly G-AEDU (built 1937) at Kemble, England, in 2019

Two flyable aircraft survive:

- DH 90A ZK-AYR (c/n 7508) is operated on scenic and aircraft experience flights by the Croydon Aircraft Company in New Zealand. It was first registered as G-AEDT, then went to Australia in 1938 as VH-AAD, being operated by Adastra Aerial Surveys until 1951; flown to the UK in 1963, the aircraft was sold to the US in 1964 as N2034. From about 1988 to 1996 it was flying as G-AEDT again, before leaving the UK for New Zealand.
- DH 90A G-AEDU (c/n 7526) has been registered in the United Kingdom since 1992, now owned by Shipping and Airlines at Biggin Hill as part of its Historic Aircraft Collection and previously owned by the Norman Aeroplane Trust. Originally delivered to Angola in 1937, it flew as CR-AAB and later as ZS-CTR in South Africa. When it was returned to England in 1979, it used a British registration (G-AEDU) that had been allocated to another Dragonfly but not used. It was exported to the United States in 1983 as N190DH but it was returned to England in 1992 in a damaged state and rebuilt to flying condition as G-AEDU.

== Operators ==
Australia

- Qantas
- Royal Australian Air Force
- Adastra Aerial Surveys
- Connellan Airways
- Bush Pilots Airways

Belgium

- Belgian Air Force

Canada

- Royal Canadian Air Force
- Royal Canadian Mounted Police

Denmark

- Royal Danish Air Force

Egypt

- Misr Airwork Ltd

India

- Air Services of India Ltd
- Royal Indian Air Force

Iraq

- King Faisal of Iraq
- Iraqi Air Force

(Kenya Colony) Kenya

- Wilson Airways – two aircraft

Laos
- Cie Laotienne de Commerce et de Transport (CLCT) – Two aircraft only
Netherlands

- Dutch Army Aviation Group

New Zealand

- Air Travel (NZ) Ltd – Two aircraft only.

Peru

- Peruvian Air Force

Rhodesia

- Rhodesian and Nyasaland Airways

Romania

- LARES

South Africa

- South African Air Force

(Spain) Spanish Republic

- Spanish Republican Air Force

Spain

- Spanish Air Force – Post civil war
- Iberia Lineas Aéreas españolas

Sweden

- Royal Swedish Air Force

Turkey

- Turkish Airlines Turkish State Airlines (Devlet Hava Yollari)

Uruguay

- PLUNA

United Kingdom

- Air Dispatch Ltd
- Air Commerce Ltd
- Air Service Training Ltd
- Air Taxis Ltd
- Anglo-European Airways Ltd
- Birkett Air Service Ltd
- British Continental Airways Ltd
- International Air Freight Ltd
- Plymouth Airport Ltd
- Royal Air Force – 15 civil aircraft were impressed into wartime service in 1940
- Silver City Airways Ltd
- Western Airways Ltd

== Specifications ==
Data from British Civil Aircraft since 1919, Volume 2

General characteristics

- Crew: 2
- Length: 31 ft 8 in (9.65 m)
- Wingspan: 43 ft 0 in (13.11 m)
- Height: 9 ft 2 in (2.79 m)
- Wing area: 256 sq ft (23.8 m^{2})
- Airfoil: RAF 34 modified
- Empty weight: 2,500 lb (1,134 kg)
- Gross weight: 4,000 lb (1,814 kg)
- Powerplant: 2 × de Havilland Gipsy Major II 4-cylinder inverted air-cooled in-line piston engines, 142 hp (106 kW) each
- Propellers: 2-bladed fixed-pitch propellers

Performance

- Maximum speed: 144 mph (232 km/h, 125 kn)
- Range: 625 mi (1,006 km, 543 nmi) with maximum payload
- Ferry range: 900 mi (1,400 km, 780 nmi) with a 25 imp gal (30 US gal; 114 L) tank at the rear of the cabin
- Service ceiling: 18,100 ft (5,500 m)
- Rate of climb: 875 ft/min (4.45 m/s)

== See also ==
- List of aircraft of the Royal Air Force
- List of aircraft of the Spanish Republican Air Force

== Bibliography ==
- Comas, Matthieu (September–October 2020). "So British!: 1939–1940, les avions britanniques dans l'Armée de l'Air" [So British!: British Aircraft in the French Air Force 1939–1940]. Avions (in French) (236): 38–61. ISSN 1243-8650.
- The Illustrated Encyclopedia of Aircraft (Part Work 1982–1985). London: Orbis Publishing.
- Hayes, P., & King, B. de Havilland biplane transports. Coulsden: Gatwick Aviation Society (2003) ISBN 0-9530413-2-8
- Jackson, A. J. British Civil Aircraft since 1919, Volume 2. London: Putnam, 1973. ISBN 0-370-10010-7 or (1988 revision) ISBN 0-85177-813-5.
- Jackson, A. J. de Havilland Aircraft since 1909. London: Putnam, 1978 ISBN 0-370-30022-X
- Grey, C. J., and Bridgman, L, Jane's All the World's Aircraft (1938). London: Sampson Low Martin.
- Lucchini, Carlo (April 1999). "Le meeting saharien de 1938" [The 1938 Sahara Air Meeting]. Avions: Toute l'aéronautique et son histoire (in French) (73): 53–57. ISSN 1243-8650.
