= New Zealand National Airways Corporation =

Domestic airline of New Zealand (1947–1978)

New Zealand National Airways Corporation (NAC)
IATA	ICAO	Call sign
NZ	NZ	NATIONAL
- Founded: December 1945
- Ceased operations: 1978 (merged with Air New Zealand)
- Focus cities: Auckland; Christchurch; Wellington
- Frequent-flyer program: NAC Flightcard
- Fleet size: 25 (1 April 1978)
- Parent company: Government of New Zealand
- Headquarters: Wellington, New Zealand
- Key people: Leonard Isitt (founding CEO); Doug Patterson (last CEO, 1978)

New Zealand National Airways Corporation, popularly known as NAC, established by the New Zealand National Airways Act, 1945, was the national domestic airline of New Zealand until 1978 when it amalgamated with New Zealand's international airline, Air New Zealand. The airline was headquartered in Wellington.

NAC was itself a government-led amalgamation of Royal New Zealand Air Force (RNZAF) 40 Transport Squadron, Union Airways and a number of other smaller operators, including the country's first commercial air service Air Travel (NZ) Ltd. At the time of its inception (1945), it was equipped with de Havilland Dragon Rapides, de Havilland Fox Moths, Douglas DC-3s, Lockheed Electras, Lockheed Lodestars, and one de Havilland Express which latter was returned to the RNZAF before the official 1947 inaugural start date. Although chiefly a domestic airline, in late 1947 NAC also provided international services to some nearby South Pacific countries, using converted ex-RNZAF Short Sunderland IIIs, as well as long-range Douglas DC-3Ds to Fiji via Norfolk Island.

By the time of the merger with Air New Zealand, the fleet consisted of 25 aircraft, Boeing 737s and Fokker F27s. Engineering workshops were set up at Christchurch, Whenuapai (Auckland), Palmerston North, Gisborne and Nelson.

== History ==
=== Initial services ===
The NAC network started with the following destinations: Kaitaia, Kaikohe, Whangārei, Auckland, Tauranga, Gisborne, Napier, New Plymouth, Palmerston North, Wellington, Blenheim, Nelson, Christchurch, Westport, Greymouth, Hokitika, Whataroa, Waiho (Franz Josef), Haast, Dunedin and Invercargill previously served by the same aircraft and personnel under the pre-nationalisation names Union Airways and Air Travel (NZ) Ltd.

The destinations that formed the NAC Pacific Island Network were Norfolk Island, Fiji, Tonga, Samoa and the Cook Islands previously served by No. 40 Squadron RNZAF.

==== Domestic services ====
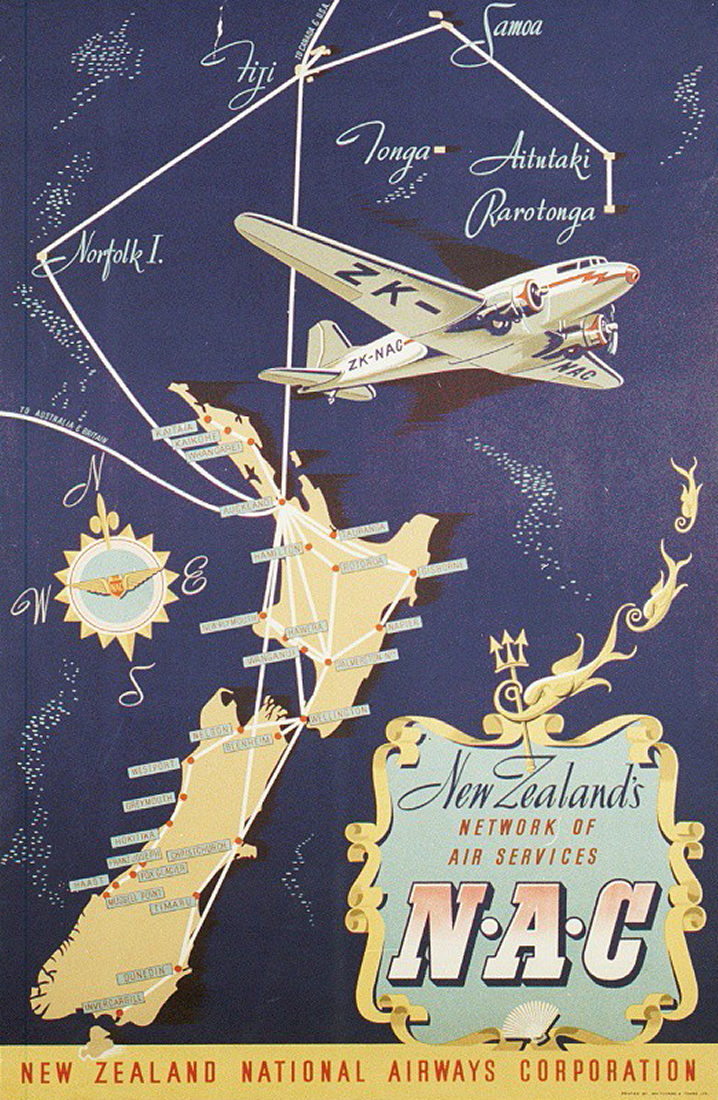
NAC New Zealand and Pacific Islands services route map

The initial network was based on destinations served by the airlines it was formed from. New destinations added between then and airline's merger with Air New Zealand included:

- Rotorua in April 1948
- Wanganui in November 1954
- Timaru in April 1957
- Whakatāne in November 1962
- Taupō and Oamaru in March 1966

In November 1956 the NAC services from Hokitika to South Westland were once again taken over by West Coast Airways. Other destinations removed from the network were Greymouth in 1951 and Kaikohe in August 1970.

==== Pacific Island services ====
NAC served the Pacific Islands in various capacities. Services began in 1947 using Douglas DC-3 aircraft and included Norfolk Island, Tonga, Samoa and the Cook Islands. Fiji was also served by NAC using Short Sunderland III's from the RNZAF. All services were withdrawn and taken over by TEAL on 15 October 1952, except for Norfolk Island which continued until September 1955.

In June 1975, Air New Zealand commenced Norfolk Island services with a chartered NAC Fokker F27-500 Friendship.

NAC wanted to return to the Pacific area in the late 1970s and began to lobby the NZ Government for a return of its international licence as it planned to equip with the larger Boeing 727-200. This was one of the catalysts for the forced merger with Air New Zealand in 1978, as the latter airline felt it could lose the Pacific Islands and charter market to NAC.

== Destinations ==
NAC flew to the following domestic destinations on 1 April 1978:

- Kaitaia
- Whangārei
- Auckland
- Hamilton
- Tauranga
- Whakatāne
- Rotorua
- Taupō
- Gisborne
- Napier
- New Plymouth
- Wanganui
- Palmerston North
- Wellington
- Blenheim
- Nelson
- Westport
- Hokitika
- Christchurch
- Oamaru
- Timaru
- Dunedin
- Invercargill

=== Alliance ===
NAC entered an alliance with the following airlines:

- Air New Zealand
- British Airways
- Pan American Airways
- Qantas
- Singapore Airlines
- Trans Australian Airlines (TAA)

== Fleet history ==
=== Piston power ===
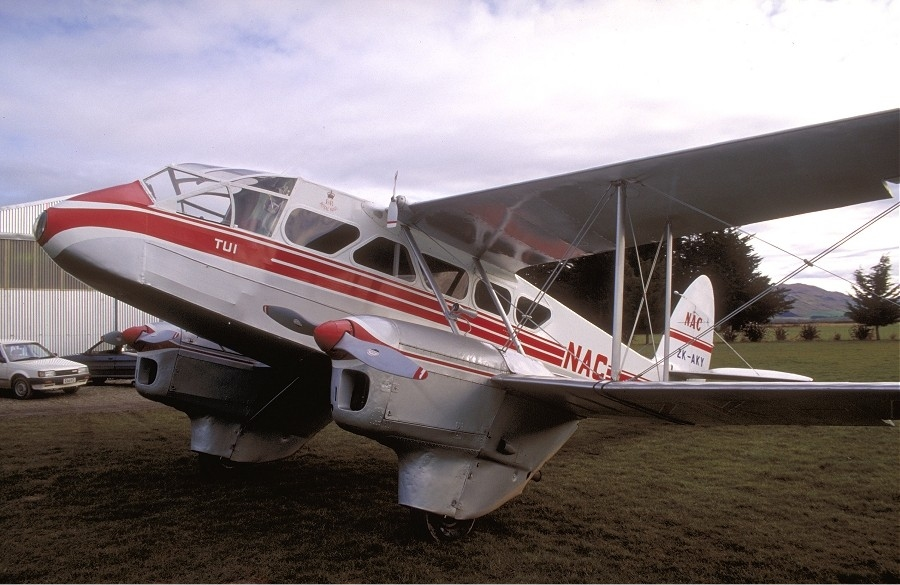
de Havilland DH.89B Dominie: NAC ZK-AKY Tui

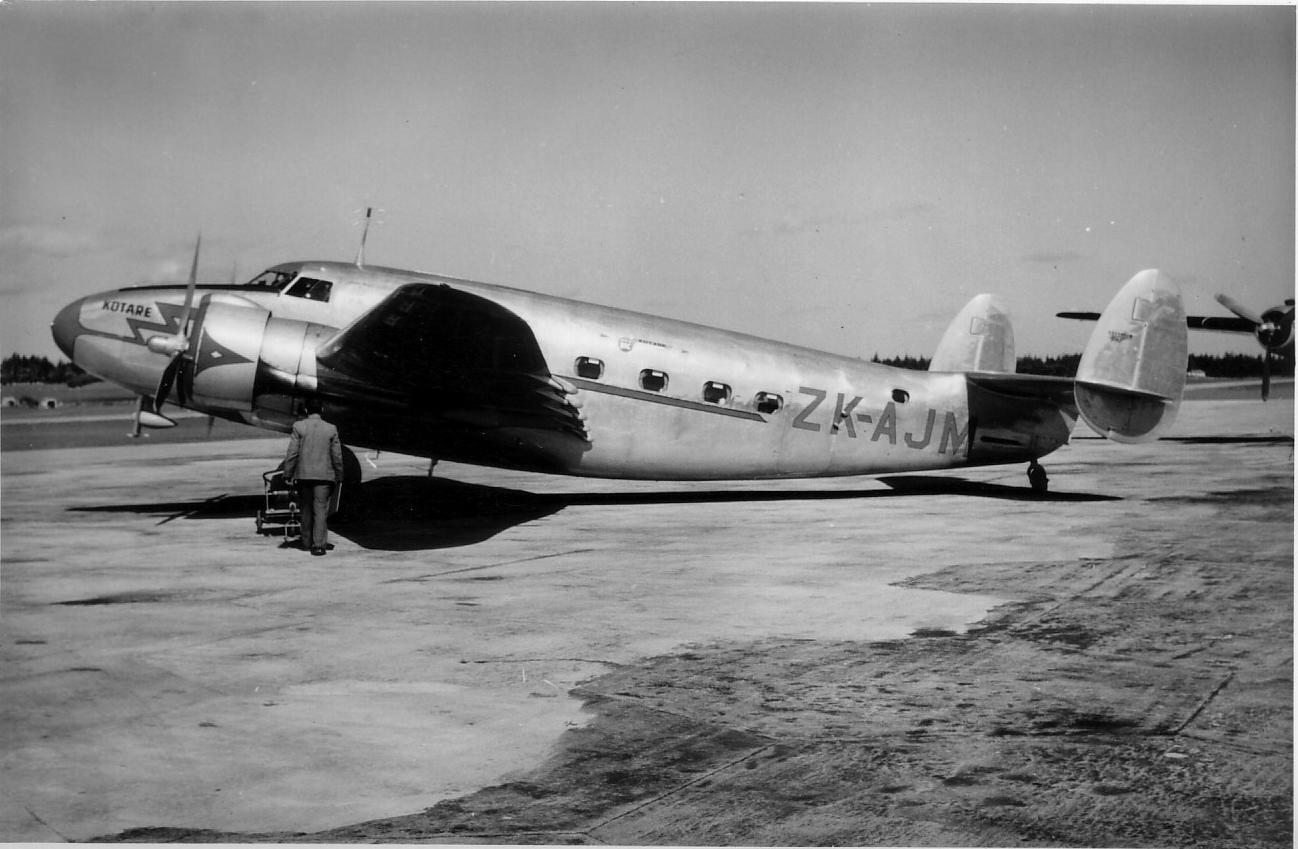
NAC inherited former World War II RNZAF transport, Lockheed Lodestar ZK-AJM, from Union Airways in 1947 and named it Kotare. It sold to the US in 1952

After World War Two NAC continued to rely on prewar 'tailwheel' types of aircraft. Both the high-speed twin-engine 10 seat Lockheed Model 10 Electra and the 15 seat Lockheed Lodestar were used, along with the slower British built de Havilland Rapide/Dominie and single-engine Fox Moth. All three twin-engine types could operate from all airports while the Rapide and Fox Moth could land on remote beaches on the West Coast as well as some lighthouse station airstrips. The de Havilland Dominie operated until 1963.

==== Douglas DC-3 ====
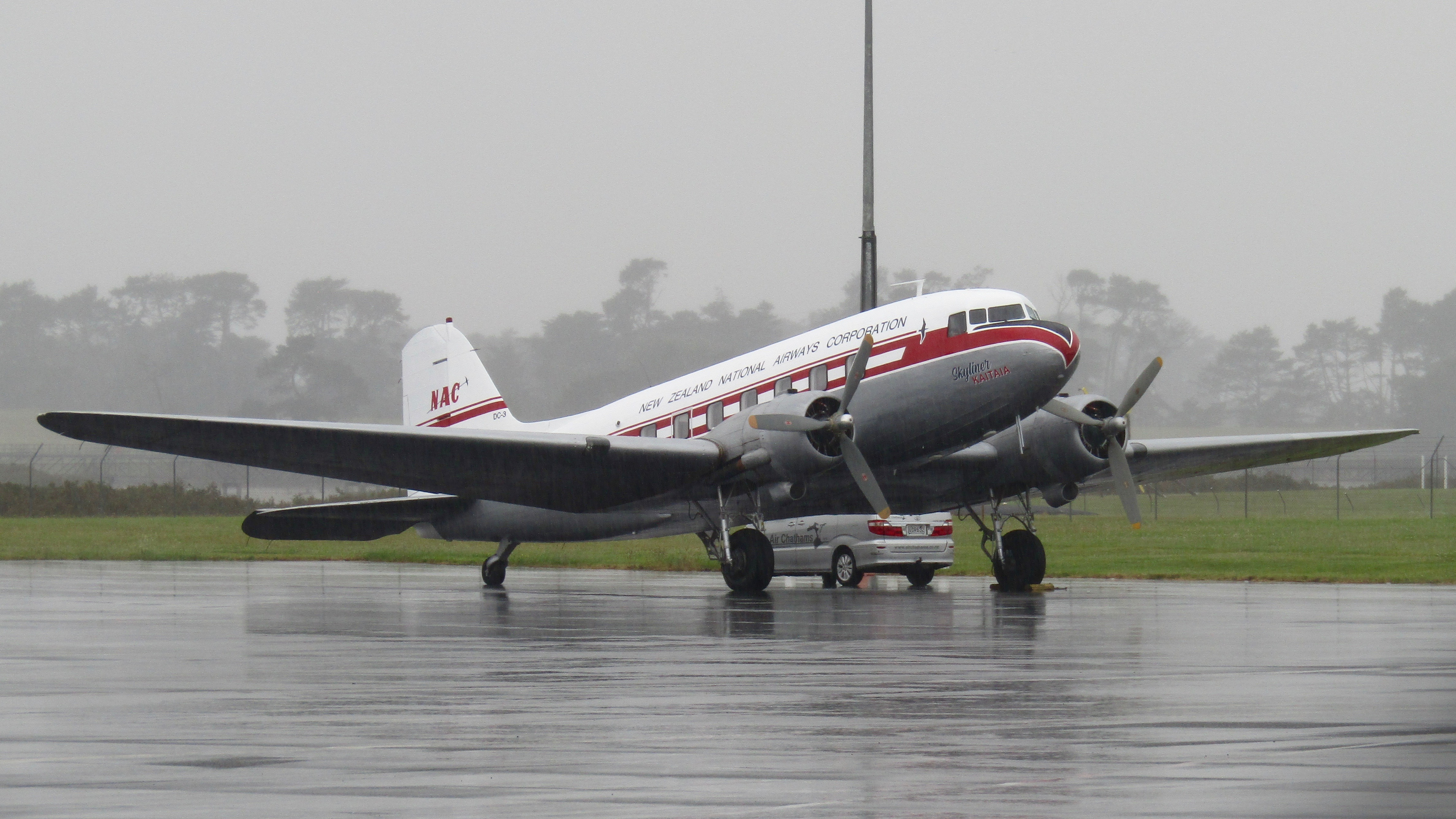
An Air Chathams DC-3 with NAC livery. It had operated for NAC under the same registration

The Douglas DC-3 was the airline's major type until the mid-1960s, with up to 27 being operated over time.

NAC operated a large airfreight network using dedicated DC-3 cargo planes under the 'Freightair' banner. These aircraft operated from airports that were not on the regular passenger network, such as Opotiki, Masterton, Alexandra and Roxburgh.

In the 1960s NAC's 12 best DC-3 "Douglas Liner" airframes were upgraded. This included better soundproofing, new interior fittings, and the fitting of larger windows. This was in response to competition in the provincial market from SPANZ, who operated DC-3s equipped with large double sized 'viewmaster' windows. NAC's upgraded aircraft were branded as 'Skyliners'. In 1954, NAC asked the government to encourage the development of airports so it could operate the Convair 440 or the Elizabethan airliner.

NAC continued using DC-3s into the 1970s. Kaikohe was permanently dropped as a destination in 1972. Passenger services to Timaru and Oamaru were operated with DC-3s until their runways were paved. One 'Skyliner' DC-3 renamed Waitaki was kept on for this service, until December 1974.

==== De Havilland Heron ====
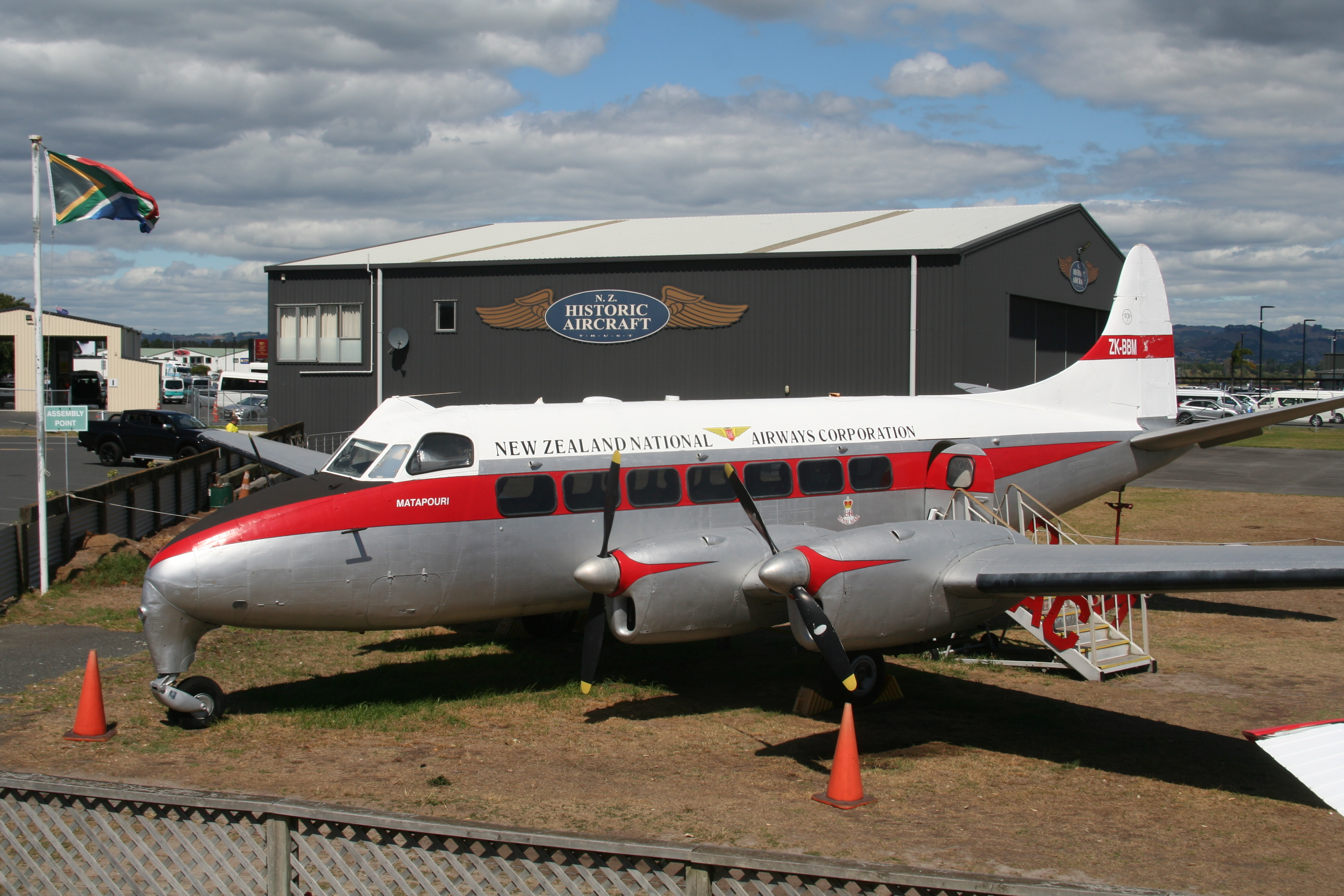
de Havilland DH.114 Heron: NAC ZK-BBM Matapouri at Tauranga

NAC operated one tricycle landing gear type of piston-powered airliner in the 1950s, the de Havilland Heron 1. Being the first four Herons produced they had fixed undercarriages instead of the retractable undercarriage on later models. The original use for this aircraft was to keep Cook Strait services to Wellington operating while Rongotai airport was being rebuilt. The Herons operated mainly from Nelson in the South Island as well as to Blenheim, Rotorua, and Hamilton. Their heavy engines caused wing spar fatigue due to the light aluminium alloy used. Steel spars were substituted but with a weight penalty reducing passenger numbers to below economical levels. De Havilland did offer the Heron 2, a major improvement over the Heron 1 but this was not taken up. Heron ZK-BEQ was used as a royal aircraft when Queen Elizabeth II and Prince Philip visited New Zealand for the first time in 1953–54.

When the old Rongotai airfield closed in 1957, the Herons were considered for the Nelson-Christchurch-Invercargill route but the aircraft were sold off to private operators instead. By then, only the DC-3 and Rapide/Dominies made up the NAC Fleet.

The last piston engine airliner to be operated by NAC was a leased Mt Cook Airline Britten Norman BN2 Islander ZK-MCD, used during 1976–77 to operate a service on the Auckland – Whangārei – Kaitaia route. This was to allow services to operate while Kaitaia's compacted gravel runway was sealed for use by heavier aircraft. The Islander used an alternative grass strip. It was repainted in the "new" Wings of the Nation red and orange colour scheme.

=== Turboprops ===
==== Vickers Viscount 807 ====
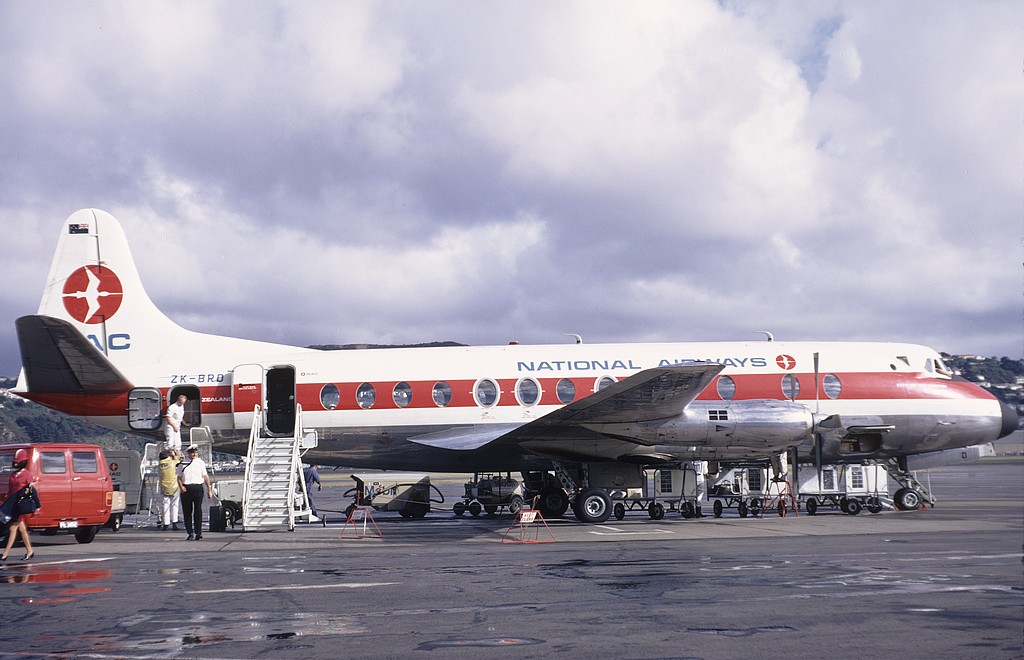
Vickers Viscount 807: NAC ZK-BRD City of Wellington at Wellington, 1971

The pioneering turbo-prop powered Vickers Viscount first appeared in New Zealand in 1953 when an early model -700 was flown out for the London to Christchurch Air Race. In 1954, after the New Zealand Government encouraged the development of nationwide airports and with the promise of Wellington Airport being completed in 1958, NAC ordered four of the new larger 800 series type.

The Vickers Viscount 807s were introduced from 1958, three initially being purchased. The first was used as a training aircraft and operated alone for a year on the Christchurch-Auckland route, and to Palmerston North which substituted for a still uncompleted Wellington International Airport. Services to Wellington began the following year, after the major reconstruction of Wellington's Rongotai Airport was completed a year later, two more Viscounts had joined the first by then. Services to Dunedin began late in 1962 with the purchase of the fourth aircraft in 1960, after the closure of Taieri Aerodrome to airliners and the opening of the larger Momona Airport further down the Taieri Plain.

The famous 'Viscount Jump' effect saw passenger numbers swell. Powered by four Rolls-Royce Dart turboprops, the Viscount was two generations ahead of the DC-3. In 1966 NAC bought a second-hand aircraft, modifying it to 807 standards, bringing the fleet to five. This opened up Viscount services to Hamilton and Invercargill.

The Vickers Viscount continued on until the last was withdrawn in 1975 when the '807' type had started to develop wing spar fatigue. The end of the Viscount era also realised NAC's wishes to operate a two aircraft type fleet. Two extra Boeing 737-200s were purchased as replacements (see below).

It would be another twenty years before the Viscount's natural successor, the ATR 72-200, would take over the major provincial services.

==== Fokker F27 Friendship ====
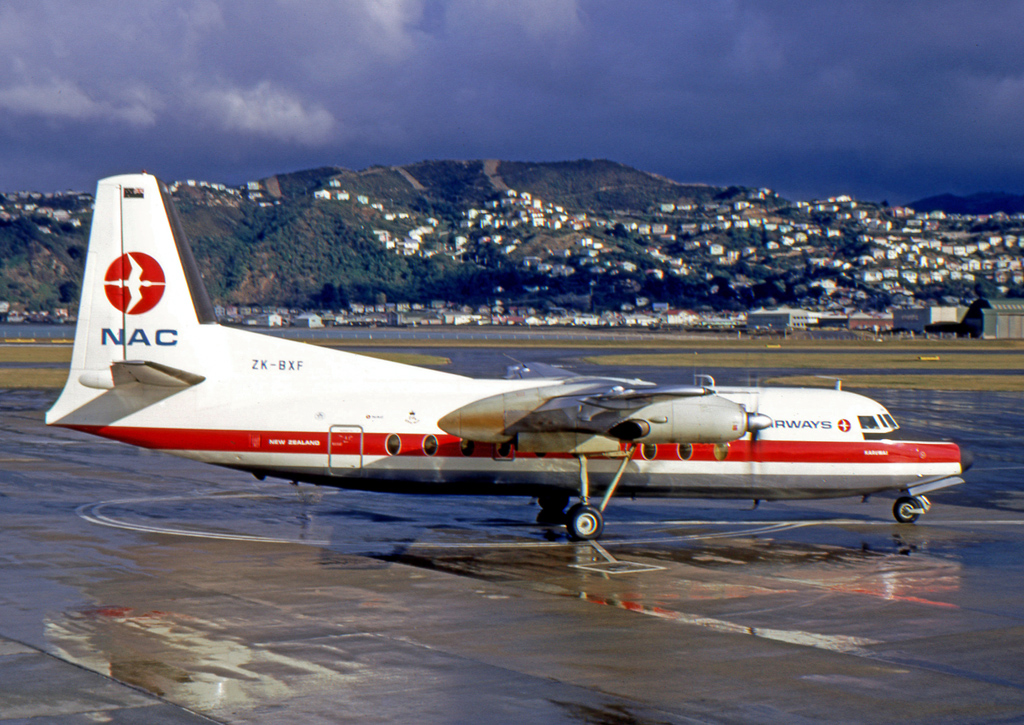
Fokker F27-100 Friendship: NAC ZK-BXF Karuwai at Wellington, 1971

For the growing provincial routes, it was a Dutch-built 30-seat airliner that would be the true successor to the DC-3. The Fokker F27-100 short-haul airliner suited the NAC provincial network perfectly and, like the Viscount, was Rolls-Royce Dart turboprop-powered would prove popular. The 'Friendship' had been flying since 1956. However, the British government attempted to force NAC's hand into purchasing the similar Handley Page Herald, reminding their New Zealand counterparts of possible trade tariffs being imposed on purchasing a 'foreign' aircraft. A British European Airways-owned Herald was flown out to New Zealand and participated in the opening of Wellington's rebuilt airport, putting on a short field and extreme manoeuvering air display. BEA management offered to leave the demonstration Herald with NAC for a year to trial on proposed routes. The New Zealand government intervened saying the Fokker aircraft had already proved itself while the Herald was still in test mode for its changed powerplants. The Fokker F27s were also Rolls-Royce powered while most of its electronic and mechanical components were made in the United Kingdom, thus negating tariff restrictions. So the Dutch built airliner won the day and a large order over time.

The Friendships began service with the first arriving in late 1960. Another seven arrived during 1961, launching provincial turbo-prop services to Hamilton, Napier, New Plymouth, Wanganui, Nelson, Blenheim, and Invercargill. They primarily operated to regional airports with sealed runways, and also on the main trunk route alongside the Viscounts, flying the off-peak services replacing the DC-3. They operated the first services to Dunedin's new Momona Airport in 1962 until traffic built up enough to use the Viscounts there. Four more secondhand -100s joined the fleet and five of the larger Fokker F27 Friendship Mk500s were purchased, three new and two secondhand, from 1973. NAC colours would return to the international Norfolk Island run, albeit under an Air New Zealand charter, with an Mk500 model flying the Auckland to Norfolk Is route.

The Friendships served New Zealand for thirty years, latterly under Air New Zealand ownership, progressively being rundown through the 1980s before the last of the fleet was withdrawn in 1990.

=== Jet power ===
As early as 1959, when the first Vickers Viscounts were entering service, NAC management discussed when to equip with pure jet aircraft. In 1963 NAC hired a de Havilland Comet 4 from Christchurch to Auckland covering the distance in 1 hour and 20 minutes. The decision to equip with jet aircraft was finally made by the NAC board of directors in 1965.

After a global tender was let, three twinjet aircraft were shortlisted, the BAC 1-11, Douglas DC-9 and the Boeing 737. The main criterion for the candidate aircraft was the ability to safely fly in and out of Wellington Airport's unique right-hand inner harbour circuit. When NAC management chose the new Boeing aircraft over the already proven BAC 1–11, the pro-British-leaning National Government promptly turned down the request for precious funds and told NAC to redo their sums again. NAC rebuffed the government's order and argued that the Boeing 737 was the best fit for the growing network. So confident was the airline that Boeing secured early delivery slots on the production line for NAC.

NAC won the Government over with the logic of simple economics: three 737-200s could do the job of four BAC 1-11s. The approval was given in late 1966 for the purchase of three 737-200s.

==== Boeing 737 ====
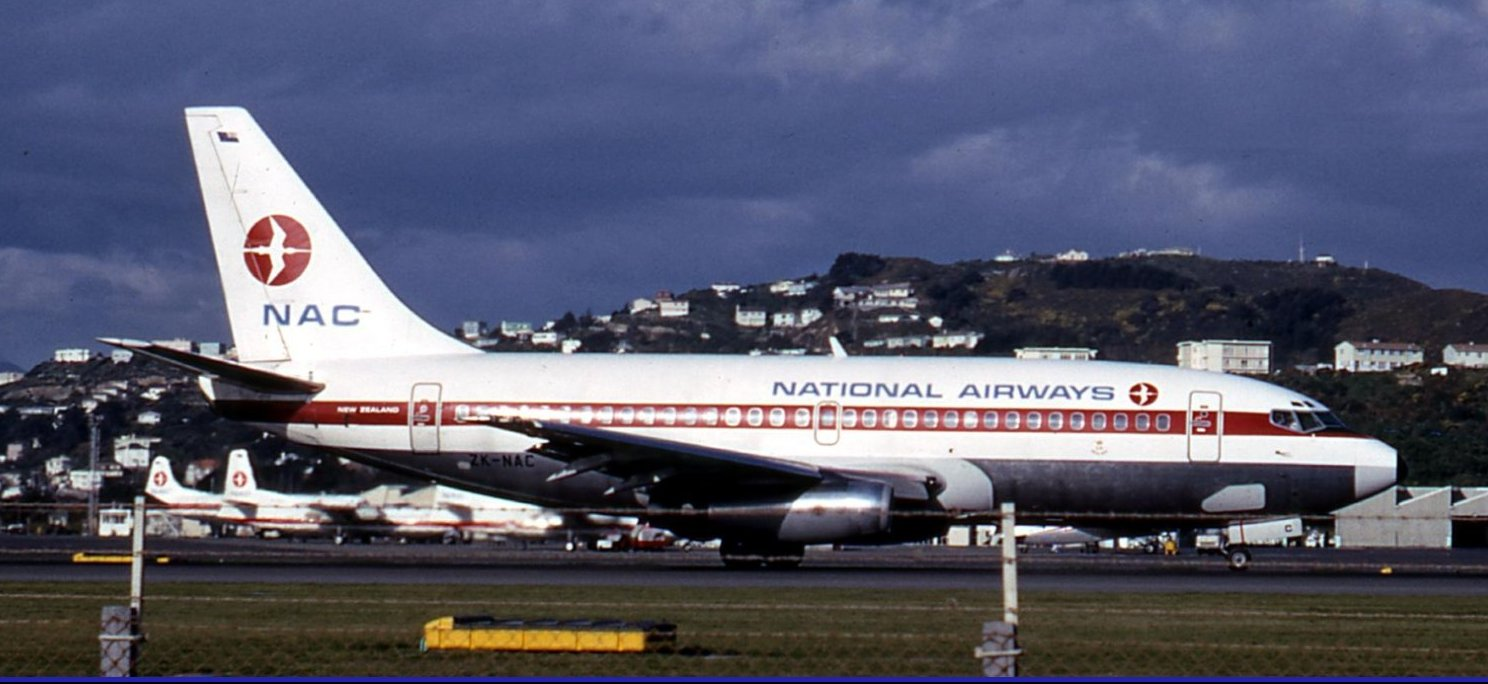
Boeing 737-219: NAC ZK-NAC at Wellington, 1970

The first Boeing 737, ZK-NAC, arrived from Seattle via Hawaii and Fiji into Wellington airport in the new livery of "National Airways" all-white body, blue titles, with a red cheatline and striking red 'Godwit' roundel on the tail. With the arrival of ZK-NAD and ZK-NAE, full services were introduced in 1968 on the "main trunk" (Auckland–Wellington–Christchurch–Dunedin). Later this extended to Invercargill, Palmerston North and Hamilton in 1975 as more aircraft were added, including ZK-NAM which had been the Boeing 737-200 prototype, N1359B. Viscounts were retired as demand for jet services grew and two more 737s joined the fleet as replacements.

NAC was one of Boeing's earliest 737 customers, the first outside the United States and West Germany. Some minor engineering tweaks to the 737 occurred during the first few years as the type developed. This included the changing of its engine's clamshell reverse thrusters over the exhaust pipes to the more familiar 'bucket' style that stayed with the 737-200 type to the end. This also helped with reducing soot emissions of the earlier model. Boeing changed the hydraulic and flap configuration of the 737 in 1973 and sold to the airline at a bargain price the last 737-200 in the original format, becoming ZK-NAJ.

=== Regional jet trials ===
The Boeing 737 had settled into routine service when NAC launched a small regional jet study to replace the Viscount. This included the Russian Yakolev Yak 40, Fokker F28 'Fellowship' and the still-experimental Hawker Siddeley HS146. When the country fell into an economic slump caused by the 1973 oil crisis and the United Kingdom joining the European Economic Community, the resultant drop in passenger numbers caused NAC to sell one of its new 737s after only six months in service. NAC quietly dropped the regional jet proposal and more F27-500s were purchased.

=== List of aircraft operated by NAC ===
Aircraft	Introduced	Retired	Replacement	Notes
Boeing 737-200	1968	1978		Eight aircraft
Britten-Norman BN-2A Islander	1976	1977		One aircraft hired from Mount Cook Airline
de Havilland DH.60G Gipsy Moth	1947	1947		One ex-Union Airways aircraft operated by NAC from April to September 1947
de Havilland DH.83 Fox Moth	1947	1954		Three aircraft, ex-Travel Air Ltd
de Havilland DH.86 Express	1948	1957		One aircraft
de Havilland DH.89A Dragon Rapide	1948	1957		One aircraft
de Havilland DH.89B Dominie	1947	1964		Six aircraft, ex-Travel Air Ltd
de Havilland DH.114 Heron 1B	1952	1957		Four aircraft
Douglas DC-3 Dakota	1947	1976	Fokker F27 Friendship	Twenty-nine aircraft
Fokker F27-100 Friendship	1960	1978		13 aircraft
Fokker F27-500 Friendship	1973	1978		Five aircraft
Lockheed Model 10A Electra	1947	1950		Five aircraft, ex-Union Airways
Lockheed Lodestar 18-56	1947	1952		13 aircraft, ex-Union Airways
Miles Gemini 1A	1947	1948		One aircraft
Short Sunderland Mk III	1947	1952		Three Sunderland flying boats operated by NAC on the Auckland to Suva service from 1947 to 1952
Vickers Viscount 807	1958	1975	Boeing 737	Five aircraft

=== List of fleet survivors ===
Ex-NAC Dragon Rapides, Fox Moths, and DC-3s still fly in private and charter operator hands. Below is a list of known surviving NAC aircraft.

Type	Registration	Name	Location/operator	Notes
Boeing 737-200	ZK-NAD	Pukeko	Charlotte, North Carolina	First 737 in NAC service. Last used as a training hulk. Thought scrapped in 2016. Found intact in late 2017 for a New Zealand preservation campaign.
de Havilland DH.83 Fox Moth	ZK-ASP	Mimiro	Croydon Aviation Heritage Centre, Mandeville	Formerly ZK-ADI. NAC from 1948 to 1953. Currently ZK-ADI.
de Havilland DH.89A Dragon Rapide	ZK-AHS	Mokai	MOTAT, Auckland	Formerly Cook Strait Airways ZK-AGT Neptune.
de Havilland DH.89A Dragon Rapide	ZK-ALB	Tikaka	NSW, Australia	Currently VH-UTV.
de Havilland DH.89B Dominie	ZK-AKY	Tui	Croydon Aviation Heritage Centre, Mandeville	
de Havilland DH.114 Heron 1B	ZK-BBM	Matapouri	Classic Flyers Museum, Tauranga	Towable.
Douglas DC-3 Skyliner	ZK-APK	Poaka; Kaikohe	Shannon, Manawatū-Whanganui	Mangaweka Adventure Company livery, –2021. Moved to Shannon for refurbishment.
Douglas C-47B Skytrain	ZK-AQP	Peho	Lee County, Florida	Formerly RNZAF NZ3538. NAC Freightair, 1947–66. Currently N146RD, converted to turbo-prop. Used for mosquito control.
Douglas DC-3 Skyliner	ZK-AWP	Powhaitere; Kaitaia	Darwin, Australia, Gooney Bird Adventures	Left service with Air Chathams Limited in 2025. Exported to Australia and now registered as VH-X73
Douglas DC-3 Skyliner	ZK-BBJ	Piripiri; Gisborne	Mombasa Go-Kart, Kenya	Formerly RNZAF NZ3552. NAC Piripiri, 1953–64, and Gisborne, –1970. Alpine Helicopters, –1972. Fieldair Freight and Morris Catering for UN, 1993–95. Derelict, Mombasa Airport, –2021. Mombasa Go-Kart for restaurant. Destroyed by fire due to an electrical surge, April 2024.
Douglas DC-3	ZK-BKD	Kotare	Smash Palace Bar, Gisborne	Formerly Australian National Airways. First DC-3 in Mount Cook and Southern Lakes Tourist Company service.
Douglas DC-3 Skyliner	ZK-BQK	Koreke; New Plymouth	MOTAT, Auckland	
Fokker F27-100 Friendship	ZK-BXG	Kea	Ferrymead, Christchurch	Incomplete.
Fokker F27-100 Friendship	ZK-BXH	Koropio	National Transport & Toy Museum, Wānaka	Air New Zealand livery. Cabin trainer in Christchurch for several years after service.
Fokker F27-100 Friendship	ZK-BXI	Kotare	Aviation Museum, Chatham Islands	Incomplete.
Fokker F27-100 Friendship	ZK-NAH	Kawatere	Aviodrome, Lelystad	Currently PH-FHF in NLM CityHopper livery.
Vickers Viscount 807	ZK-BRF	City of Christchurch	Ferrymead, Christchurch	Small shamrock painted on the starboard nose undercarriage door.

== Uniforms ==
In 1965–66, Barbara Penberthy of Auckland was the first New Zealander to design the airline's uniform. Created as a departure from the 'uniform look', it was a high-fashion two-piece suit and blouse with matching coat and hat. The fabric was all-wool barathea, dyed to a colour named 'golden cloud' specially created for NAC; a name by which the uniform came to be known. The suit jacket would be removed before onboard aircraft duties. The blouse consisted of three-quarter sleeves, a self-pleated panel down the front, three decorative pearl buttons at the neck and double cuffs with pearl cuff-links. The new 9ct gold NAC staff hat-badge, designed by NAC staff, framed NAC's godwit symbol within a circle. Discarding sleeve braid, ranks were then denoted by the number of small silver stars on the bar of the jacket insignia also designed by airline staff. Stockings were in a colour specially created for the uniform and named 'cirrus'. The hat, from a New Zealand milliner, was nicknamed the 'Mustard Pot'.

One of the airline's most memorable outfits was designed by Babs Radon (Barbara Penberthy) in 1970, in vibrant colours to attract younger flyers. The uniform consisted of four different coloured frocks, complemented with either a red or green jacket and matching hat. Two white frocks contrastingly trimmed with red and green on the neck and tab front, and a green and a red dress trimmed with white, were semi-fitted with a slightly A-line skirt and short sleeves. The navy blue New Zealand wool top coat, a semi-fitting single-breasted style with gold and copper buttons, was worn with a white cravat. The hostess could choose to wear the uniform with shoes in different shades or white skin-fit boots.

Following consultation with hostesses and three years of development by a committee, which included three hostesses and specialist apparel industry advice, NAC introduced a new mix-and-match all-seasons hostess uniform in November 1976. Coordinated from six basic pieces, the uniform sought to provide the wearer with individual variety and climate suitability—a basic white polyester cotton shirtdress with a printed red and blue bold houndstooth pattern, navy blue street-length pinafore in double-knit washable wool jersey, red lambswool jumper with white banded neckline and cuffs, navy blue straight-cut slacks, navy blue short jerkin, navy blue tailored blazer, along with a red, blue and white beret for ground use. The classic navy blue coat, double-breasted and extended to mid-calf length, was retained. Relaxed uniform rules permitted hostesses to wear rings, small earrings and a silver, gold or pearl necklace.

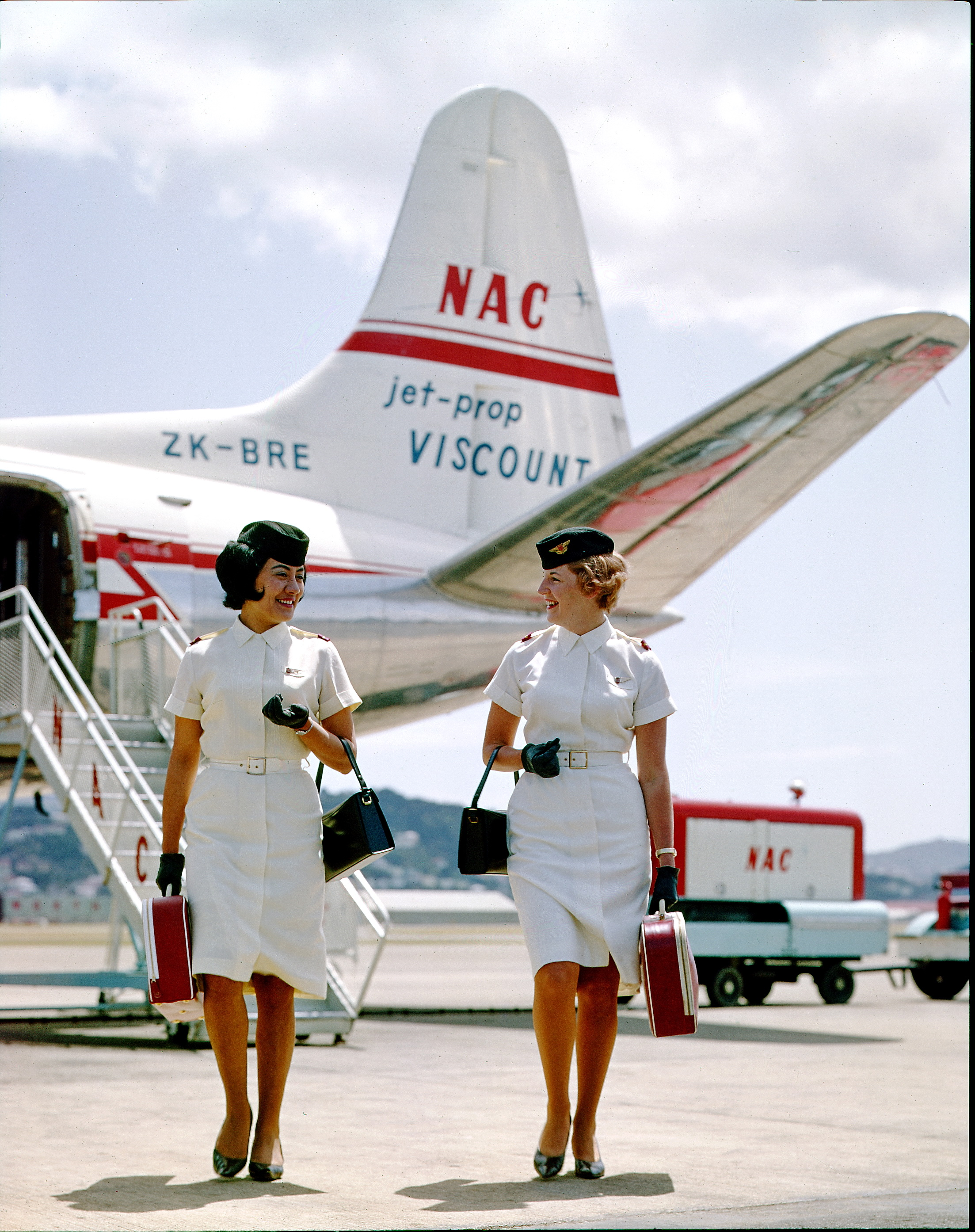
NAC Hostess summer uniform, 1959

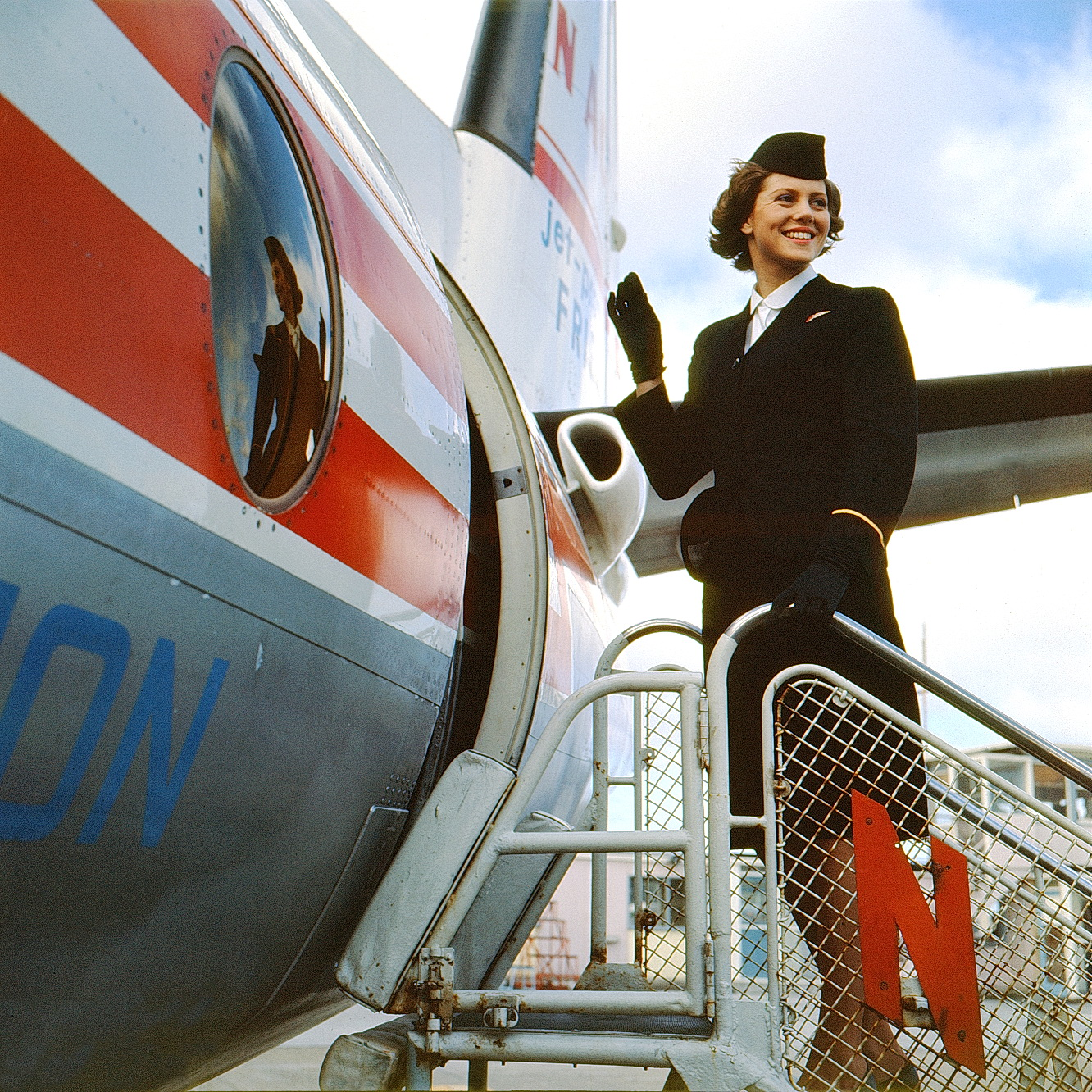
NAC Hostess winter uniform, 1959

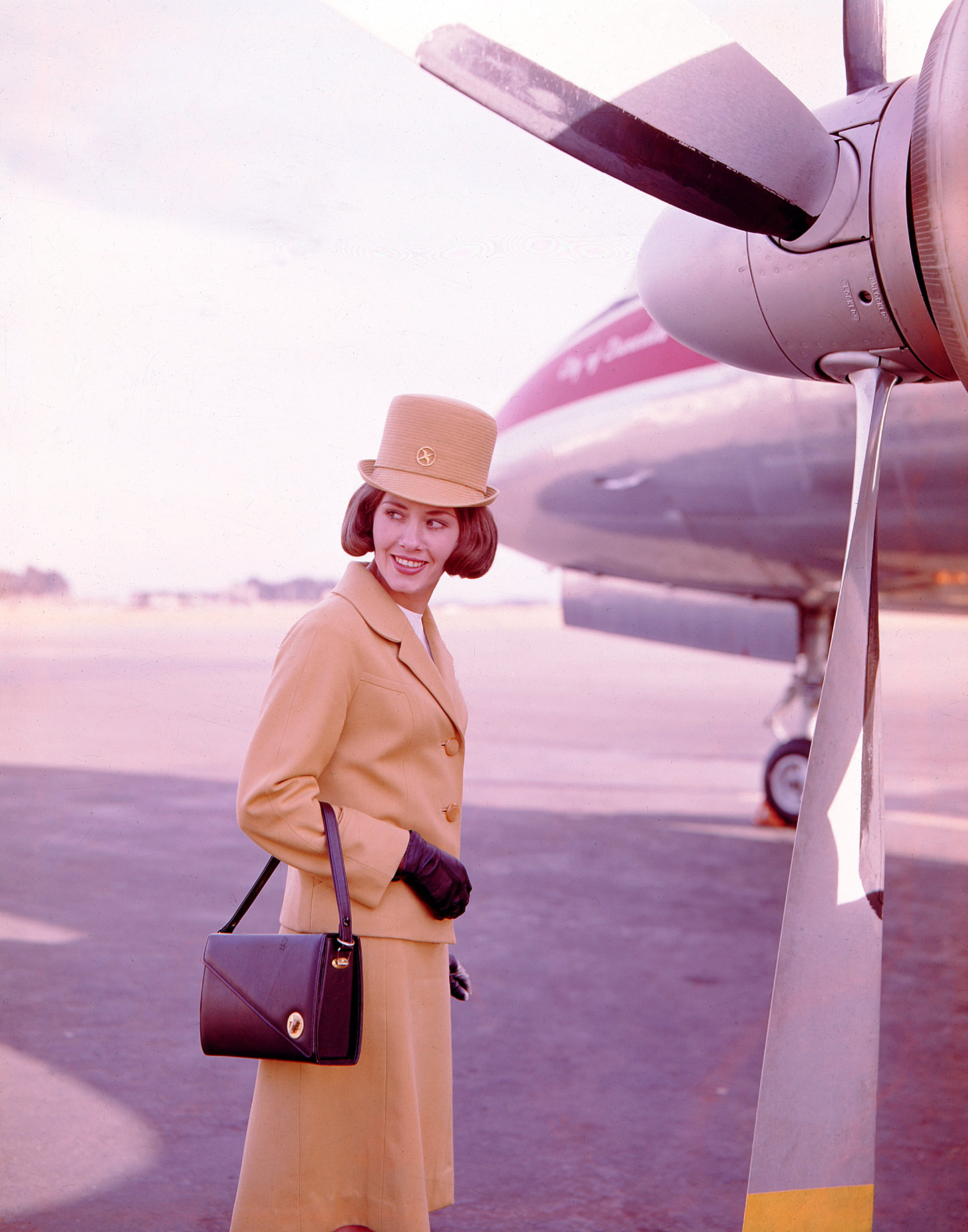
NAC Hostess uniform, Golden Cloud, 1965

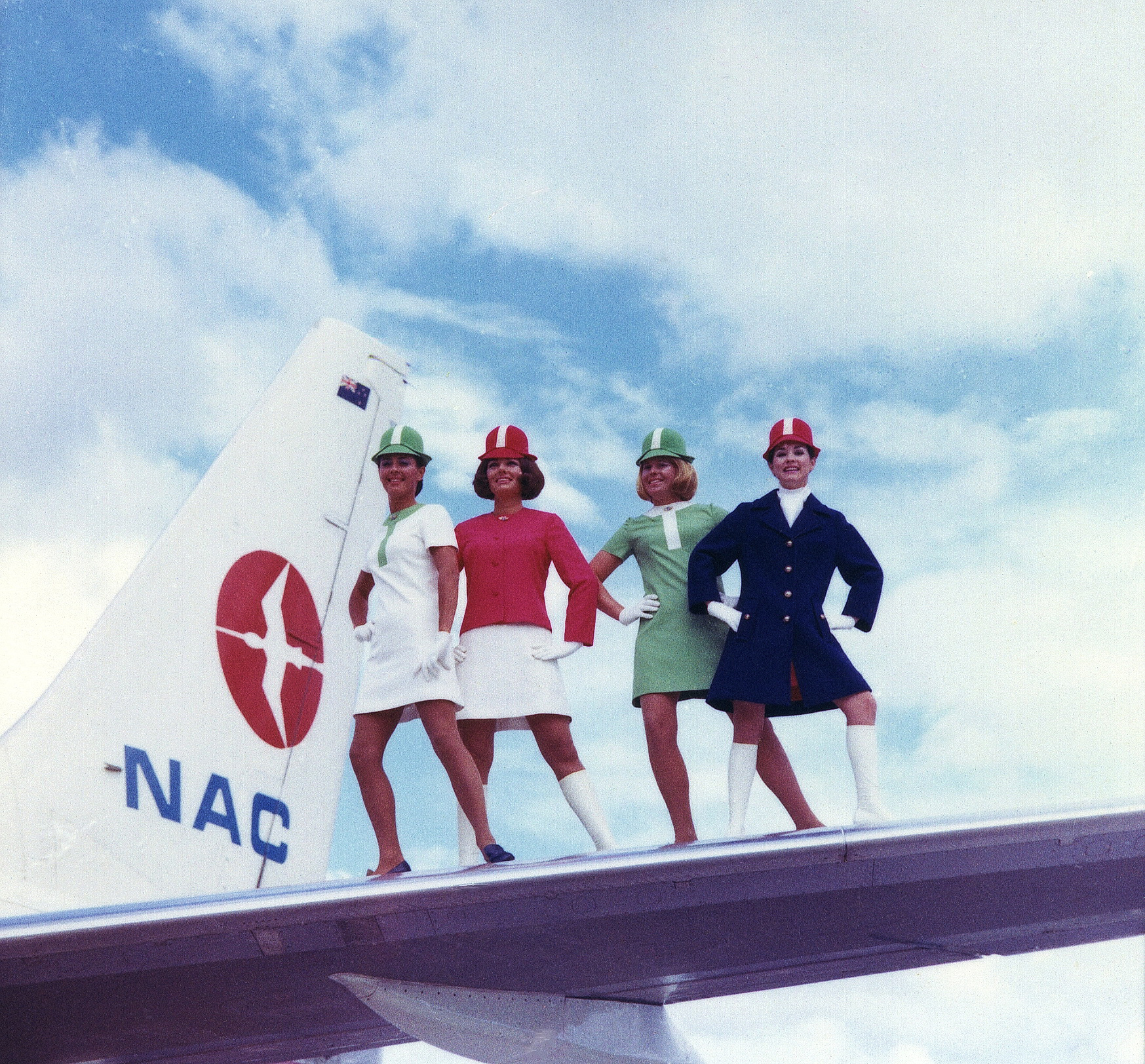
NAC Hostess uniform, 1970

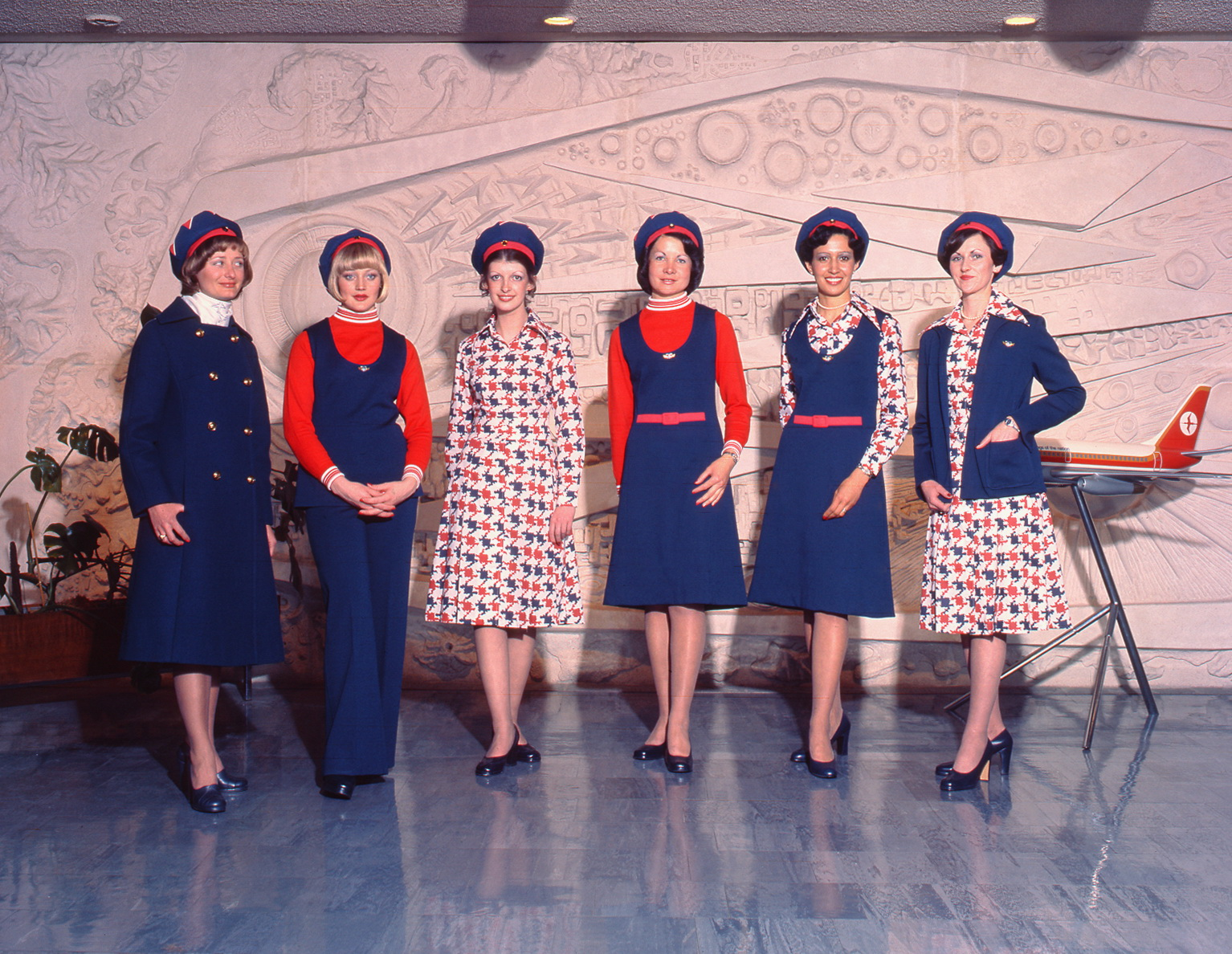
NAC Hostess mix-and-match uniform combinations, 1976

== Other interests ==
=== Bay of Plenty Airways ===
NAC made a rare foray into the small airline business with the purchase in September 1961 of a one third shareholding in Tauranga based Bay of Plenty Airways. This was the only occasion NAC invested in another passenger airline but ironically it was two months before the airline's tragic loss of their Aero Commander on Mt Ruapehu. This directly led to Bay of Plenty Airways' demise. NAC took over the Wellington – Tauranga route outright shortly after.

=== Mount Cook Airlines ===
NAC entered an agreement in 1961 with the tourist route oriented Mount Cook Airlines, offering some of its light routes in both North and South Islands to Mount Cook with the latter airline staying away from the main trunk and larger provincial centre routes. One such route was the Christchurch to Timaru and Oamaru DC-3 service in 1966. NAC also provided Mount Cook with a 'guarantor' back up when the airline purchased its first Hawker Siddeley HS 748 airliner and later a de Havilland Twin Otter. In 1973 NAC took a minor shareholding in the Mount Cook Group, the parent company of Mount Cook Airlines; Air New Zealand would later absorb this share when merger amalgamated the airlines.

=== Safe Air ===
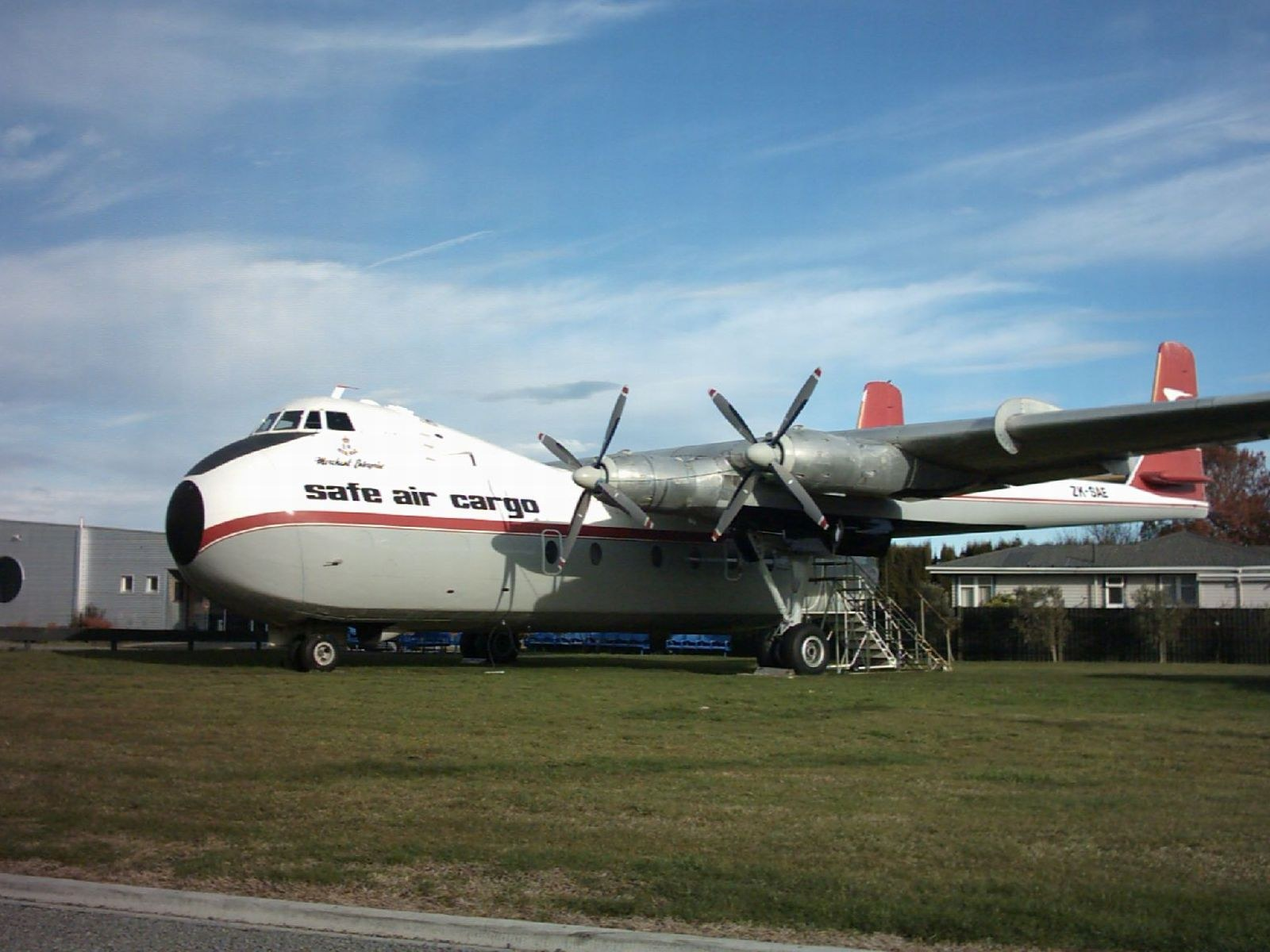
Armstrong Whitworth Argosy: SAFE Air ZK-SAE Merchant Enterprise exhibited at Blenheim

In September 1972, NAC acquired 100% ownership of freight company Safe Air Limited, formerly known as Straits Air Freight Express Limited (SAFE) established in 1951, with acquisition of Air Holdings Limited's 94% share holding. The airline operated Bristol Freighter and Armstrong Whitworth Argosy aircraft. It was to continue as a separate company based in Blenheim.

== Accidents and incidents ==
=== NAC Freight Air crash ===
NAC suffered its first fatal air crash on 9 August 1948 when DC-3 Freighter ZK-AOE Parera crashed above Port Underwood claiming the lives of Commanders Murdo MacLeod and RJRH "Dicky" Makgill. The DC-3 had taken off from Woodbourne Airport near Blenheim on a routine freight flight bound for Paraparaumu and entered cloud, crashing into Scraggy Ridge. A lack of radio navigation equipment was highlighted in the crash report. Some wreckage remains on the ridge.

=== Electra crash ===
On 23 October 1948, NAC Lockheed Model 10 Electra ZK-AGK Kaka crashed on the south-western slopes of Mt Ruapehu in the centre of New Zealand's North Island while flying in clouds. The aircraft was flying from Palmerston North to Hamilton, but drifted right off track after passing over Whanganui and collided with the mountain killing all thirteen people on board. The wreckage was located a week later near the summit. The accident highlighted the lack of air navigation radio beacons in New Zealand at the time.

=== Lodestar crash ===
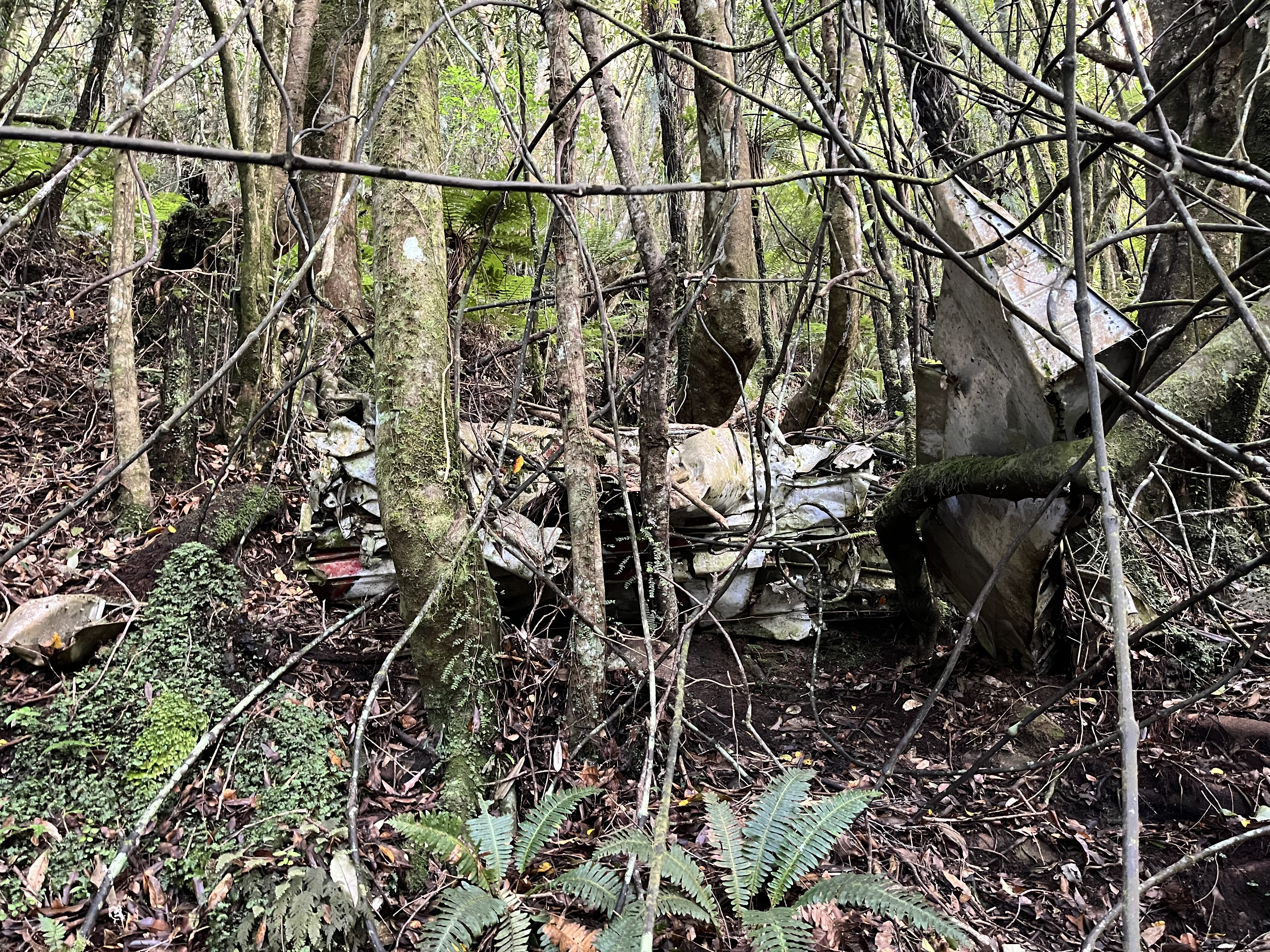
Parts of the remaining wreckage of Lockheed Lodestar ZK-AKX “Kereru” as at May 2025

On 18 March 1949, NAC Lockheed Lodestar ZK-AKX Kereru, flying from Auckland, flew into terrain in the foothills of the Tararua Ranges above Peka Peka while approaching Paraparaumu Airport, killing all 13 passengers and 2 crew on board. The pilot was deemed to have become disoriented in low cloud. Once again blame was given to a lack of navigational radio beacons in New Zealand. This crash was the worst aviation disaster in New Zealand until the Kaimai Range crash in 1963.

Portions of the wreckage still remain at the crash site though much of the airframe, including a nearly-intact tail section, were recovered by Defence personnel in 1988. The parts were taken to the Air Force Museum of New Zealand at Wigram in Christchurch to assist in the restoration of Lockheed Hudson NZ2013 for static display.

=== Raumati Beach crash landing ===
On 22 May 1954, NAC Douglas DC-3 ZK-AQT Piere operating as Flight 152 from Christchurch crash landed on Kohutuhutu Rd in the beachside settlement of Raumati Beach when approaching Paraparaumu Airport on short finals. Of the 26 people on board, 23 survived. The pilot, Captain Bill Pettet, managed to get the passenger door open before the fire reached it. Three unaccompanied infant children died. NAC was subsequently ordered to have a stewardess on board all DC-3 flights with unaccompanied children under 12 years of age. The crash was caused by fuel starvation, the wrong fuel line cutover switch had been activated. The engines failed to restart, the aircraft hit macrocarpa trees and plunged onto the road below Dr. Stevenson-Wright's house. Miraculously the fuselage rested right in the middle of the road without further collision but the wreck burst into flames. The doctor and his visitors ran to the passengers' aid and all but the infants walked out relatively unharmed. The doctor and his visitors had been enjoying a coffee break while looking out to sea when they saw the plane heading straight for them. They were saved by the trees.

=== Kaimai disaster ===
On 3 July 1963, a NAC Douglas DC-3 crashed into the Kaimai Ranges in New Zealand's North Island while flying in clouds and turbulence. The aircraft was flying from Whenuapai, Auckland to Tauranga. The aircraft struck a vertical rock face after encountering a strong downdraft. The aircraft may also have commenced an early descent with the pilots unaware of the true position of the aircraft. All 23 people on board were killed. The wreckage remains on the hillside with a small memorial cairn beside it.

=== Other incidents ===
- On 19 April 1948, Lockheed Model 10 Electra ZK-AGJ Kahu on a flight from Mangere – Tauranga – Gisborne was caught in a sudden heavy squall moments before landing at Tauranga. The sudden downburst forced the Electra into the lagoon in front of the runway threshold. The passengers were unharmed; ZK-AGJ, however, was written off as uneconomic to repair.
- On 24 February 1949 Lockheed Model 10 Electra ZK-ALH Korere belly landed at Hamilton on a through flight from Auckland to Rotorua. The undercarriage collapsed, causing the Electra to slide across the airfield to a halt. Passengers were more bemused than shaken and continued their onward flight via bus.
- On 14 January 1950, NAC de Havilland DH89B Dominie ZK-ALC Tiora was preparing to take off from Rotorua Aerodrome when a backfire from the port engine ignited dry grass under the aircraft. The aircraft's pilot, Commander Bill Rainbow, and passengers exited the aircraft leaving the starboard engine running while ground crews attempted to extinguish the fire. However, it was too late and by the time the Rotorua Fire Brigade arrived, they could only dampen down the wreckage. ZK-ALC was completely destroyed, along with the passengers' luggage.
- On 12 November 1958, brand new Vickers Viscount ZK-BRD City of Wellington suffered an accidental wheels up landing at Whenuapai when Captain 'Johnny' Walker, co-piloting for Captain Peter Matheson, selected the undercarriage up lever instead of full flaps up. The Viscount slewed off the runway and onto the soft grass. Passengers were shaken and the aircraft suffered moderate superficial damage but was repaired in time for the Christmas season in December.
- On 16 October 1961, Fokker F27-100 Friendship ZK-BXB Kotuku, moments from boarding passengers and crew at Invercargill airport suffered an undercarriage failure when the portside main leg retracted. Ground crew had just removed the safety locking pin when the leg retracted. It was discovered that an undercarriage selector valve had failed.
- On 17 February 1963, Viscount ZK-BWO City of Dunedin on a flight from Auckland experienced wind shear just prior to touch down at Wellington. Towards the end of its landing run it veered off the runway embankment at the southern Moa Point Road end, none of the 37 passengers and four crew suffered injury. The aircraft was hauled back up and propellers replaced.
- On 13 July 1974, Fokker F27-100 Friendship ZK-NAF Korimako while on a flight from Christchurch to Palmerston North developed a fault in its starboard undercarriage. The captain elected to land at Wellington where the undercarriage collapsed near the end of the landing run. Minor damage to the aircraft was sustained and was soon returned to service. This was the last incident involving aircraft under NAC ownership.

== Last years ==
In 1975 the airline introduced a new "NAC Wings of the Nation" livery – a two-toned orange colour scheme with the 'Godwit' roundel on an orange tail fin. Air New Zealand DC-10s or DC-8s were often hired to move burgeoning holiday-maker numbers which brought about the idea of purchasing the larger Boeing 727-200. This would have also allowed the airline to challenge Air New Zealand on Trans Tasman and Pacific Island routes. Boeing offered to buy back NAC's three original 737 models as trade-ins to help purchase costs and approached NAC with the then proposed B757/767 family, opening up new markets. McDonnell Douglas also joined in with a DC-10 offer to NAC, re-igniting the merger debate within the New Zealand Government.

In the end, it was Air New Zealand that was threatened by the domestic market airline and the government acted.

=== Merger ===
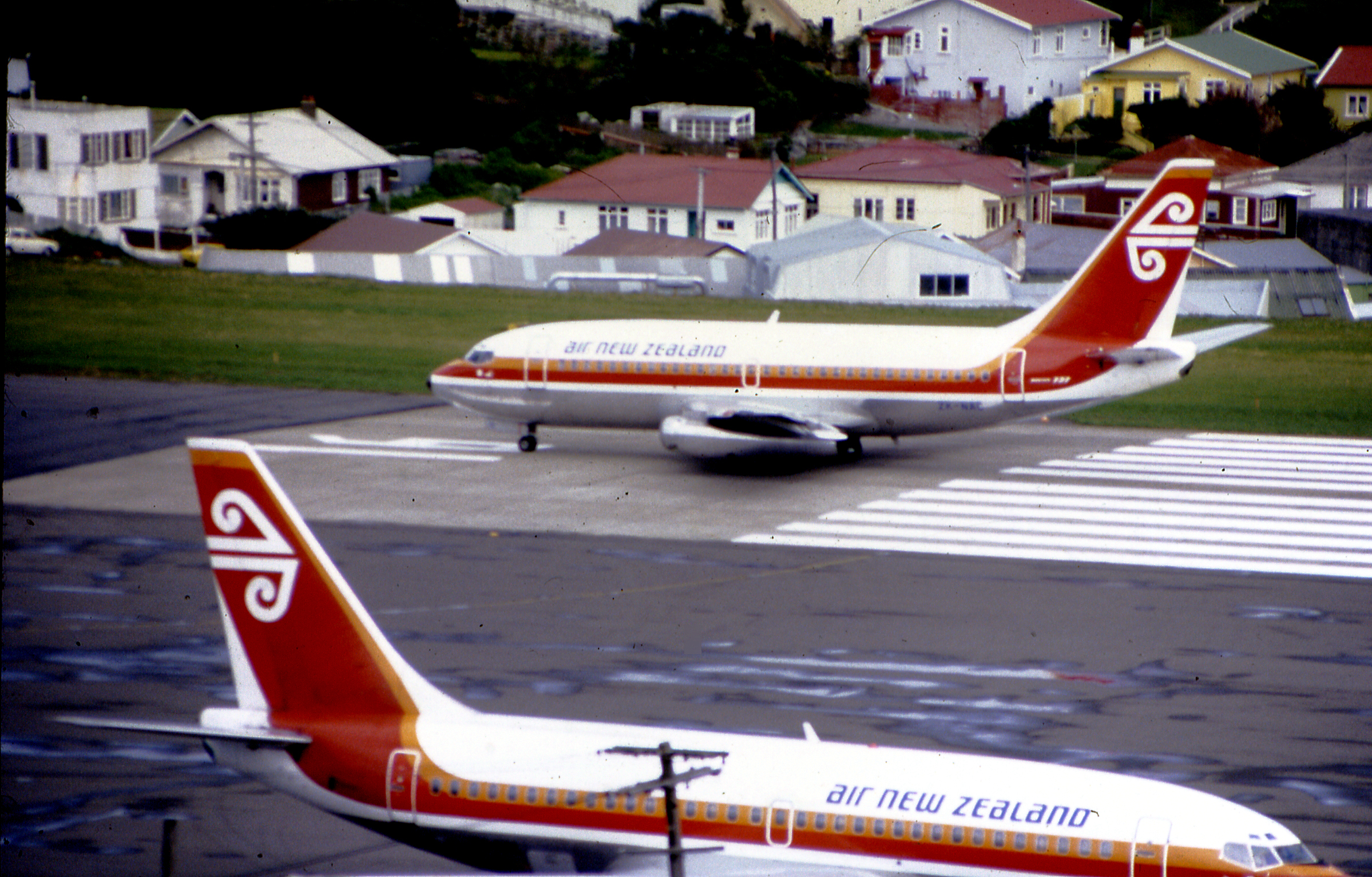
Boeing 737s in hybrid Air New Zealand and NAC livery at Wellington, 1980

On 1 April 1978, after thirty-one years in operation, NAC merged with Air New Zealand to form the domestic arm of the airline. The highly unpopular decision to join the airline with Air New Zealand was inevitable; with full deregulation of the commercial aviation industry in New Zealand was still eight years away. The NAC fleet at the time of merger consisted of 26 aircraft:

Aircraft	Total
Boeing 737-200	8
Fokker F27-100	13
Fokker F27-500	5

The Godwit tail livery was hurriedly covered over with a hybrid Air New Zealand title and Koru tail scheme still using the two-tone orange NAC final colours. Small Godwit symbols were placed beneath the cockpit side windows as a link to the past. These survived into the full repainted Teal Blue era, but by the 1990s they had been painted out.

== See also ==
- List of defunct airlines of New Zealand
- History of aviation in New Zealand
