= McGregor (surname) =

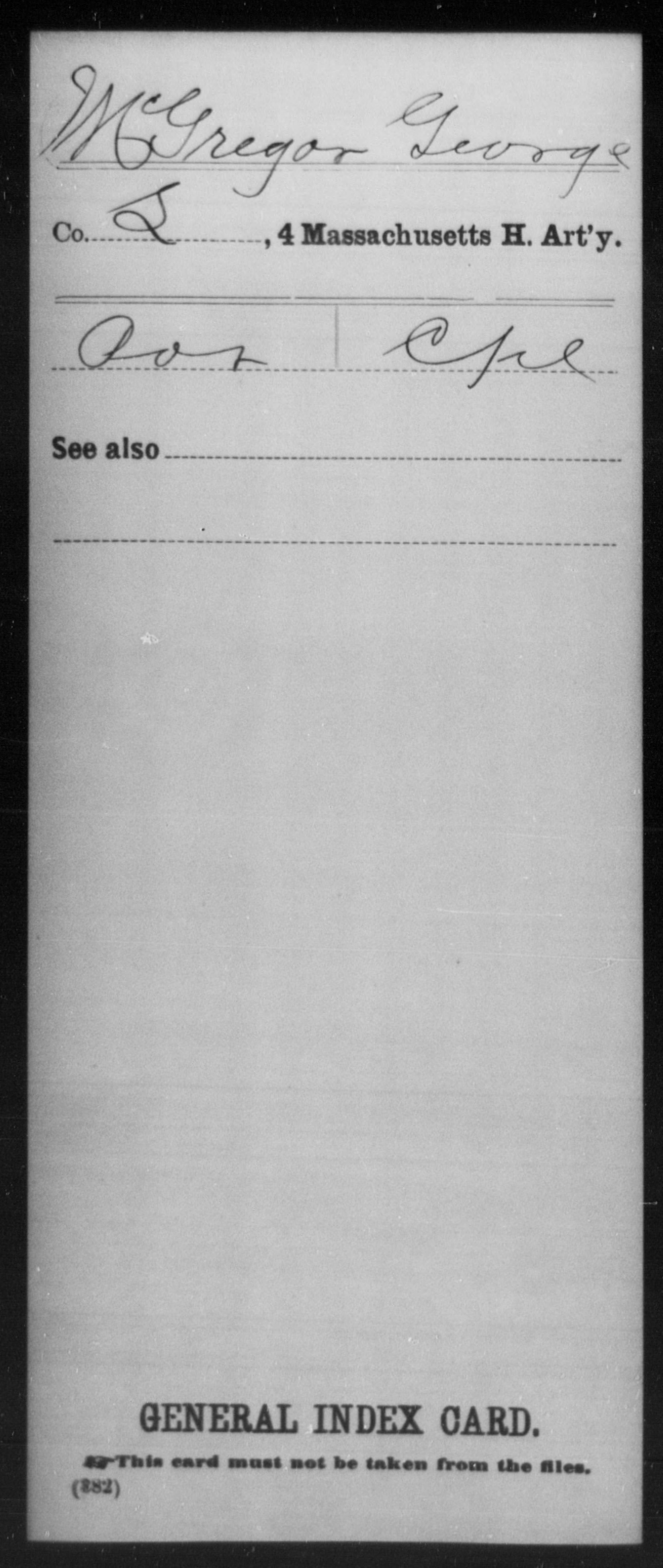

McGregor is a Scottish surname. It is derived from the Gaelic Mac Griogair / Mac Greagair meaning 'son of Griogar', the Gaelic form of the given name Gregory. Clan MacGregor were a famous Highland Scottish clan.

== Notable McGregors ==
=== Arts and entertainment ===
- Ali McGregor, Australian opera soprano
- Chris McGregor (1936–1990), South African pianist
- Dion McGregor, American songwriter
- Don McGregor, American comic book writer
- Ewan McGregor, Scottish actor
- Fiona Kelly McGregor, Australian writer and performance artist
- Freddie McGregor, Jamaican singer
- Helen McGregor (writer), English writer
- Jane McGregor, Canadian actress
- Neil McGregor (film director), Australian film director
- Scott McGregor (actor) (born 1981), Australian model, Neighbours actor and TV presenter
- Scott McGregor (television presenter) (born 1957), Australian actor, television presenter and railway enthusiast
- Scott MacGregor (art director) (1914–1971), British art director

=== Business ===
- Douglas McGregor (1906–1964), American business theorist and management professor
- Gordon Roy McGregor, Canadian, president of Air Canada and Trans Canada Airlines
- Gordon Morton McGregor, Canadian, founded Ford Motor Company of Canada, Limited
- Scott A. McGregor (born 1956), American technology executive and philanthropist

=== Military ===
- Cate McGregor, Australian military officer
- Douglas McGregor (1895–1953), Canadian military aviator
- Malcolm C. McGregor (1896–1936), New Zealand born World War I flying ace

=== Politics ===
- Donald Morris McGregor (1923–2003), Canadian politician
- Duncan McGregor (politician), American politician
- Gregor McGregor, Scottish-born Australian politician
- William McGregor (politician), Canadian politician

=== Science and academia ===
- Douglas McGregor, American business theorist and management professor
- Helen McGregor (geologist) (born 1972), Australian geologist and climate change researcher
- James Lewin McGregor, Canadian mathematician
- Ronald Stuart McGregor (1929–2013), New Zealand philologist, Reader in Hindi at Cambridge
- William B. McGregor, Australian professor of linguistics at Aarhus University, Denmark
- Richard Crittenden McGregor, (1871–1936), ornithologist and naturalist, born in Australia but naturalized American

=== Sport ===
- Alistair McGregor, Scottish field hockey goalkeeper
- Allan McGregor, Scottish footballer
- Andrew McGregor (1867–?), Scottish footballer
- Braiden McGregor (born 2001), American football player
- Bryan McGregor (born 1984), Canadian professional ice hockey player
- Callum McGregor, Scottish footballer
- Conor McGregor (born 1988), Irish mixed martial artist, former UFC champion
- Darren McGregor, Scottish footballer
- Dougie McGregor (1889–1963), New Zealand dual-code international rugby footballer
- Dugald McGregor, Australian rugby league player
- Keli McGregor (1962–2010), Colorado Rockies president
- Jordan McGregor, Scottish footballer
- Katie McGregor, American athlete
- Neil McGregor, (born 1985), Scottish footballer
- Neil McGregor (rugby union) (1901–1973) New Zealand rugby player
- Paul McGregor (rugby league) (born 1967), Australian rugby league player
- Paul McGregor (footballer) (born 1974), English footballer
- Rona McGregor, Canadian female curler
- Shannon McGregor (born 1999), Scottish association football player
- William McGregor (football), Scottish founder of the English Football League
- Scott McGregor (left-handed pitcher) (born 1954), American Major League Baseball player who pitched for the Baltimore Orioles
- Scott McGregor (basketball) (born 1976), Australian basketball player
- Scott McGregor (right-handed pitcher) (born 1986), American minor league baseball player

=== Fictional characters ===
- Mr. McGregor, character created by Beatrix Potter for the children's book The Tale of Peter Rabbit
- Callum McGregor, main character from Malorie Blackman's novel Noughts + Crosses, portrayed by Jack Rowan in a BBC adaptation
- Scott McGregor, character in 10 Years (2011 film)
- Scotty McGregor, character in The Crazies (2010 film)

== See also ==
- MacGregor (surname)
