= Helen McGregor =

Helen McGregor may refer to:

- Helen McGregor (writer), writer, actor and lecturer (1974-2021)
- Helen McGregor (geologist) (1974) Australian geologist and climate change researcher
- SS Helen McGregor, an American river-steamboat destroyer by boiler explosion 1830
