= Tasman Empire Airways Limited =

International airline of New Zealand (1940–1965)

IATA	ICAO	Call sign
TE	—	TEAL
- Founded: 26 April 1940
- Ceased operations: 1 April 1965 (renamed Air New Zealand Limited)
- Hubs: Auckland Airport
- Fleet size: 18
- Destinations: Auckland; Sydney; Wellington; Melbourne; Fiji; Samoa; Cook Islands; Tahiti; Christchurch
- Headquarters: Auckland, New Zealand

Tasman Empire Airways Limited (1940–1965), better known by its acronym TEAL, is the former name of Air New Zealand.

TEAL was formed by the Intergovernmental Agreement for Tasman Sea Air Services (also known as the Tasman Sea Agreement), which is a treaty signed by the governments of the United Kingdom, Australia, and New Zealand in London on 10 April 1940. TEAL was first registered in Wellington as a limited liability company on 26 April 1940. The company's purpose was originally to transport mail, passengers, and cargo across the Tasman Sea between Australia and New Zealand during World War II. The treaty was originally intended to end within three months after hostilities with Germany ended, but it was extended in 1949 and ultimately ended on 31 March 1954, with control and ownership passing into normal commercial arrangements.

Shares in the company were originally held by the New Zealand Government (20%), Union Airways (19%), BOAC (38%) and Qantas (23%). After World War II shareholding passed to equal ownership by the New Zealand and Australian governments. Four Short Sandringham aircraft and Short Solent aircraft were acquired, as well as an ex-Royal New Zealand Air Force Consolidated PBY Catalina for survey flights.

== Routes and services ==
=== Tasman Service ===
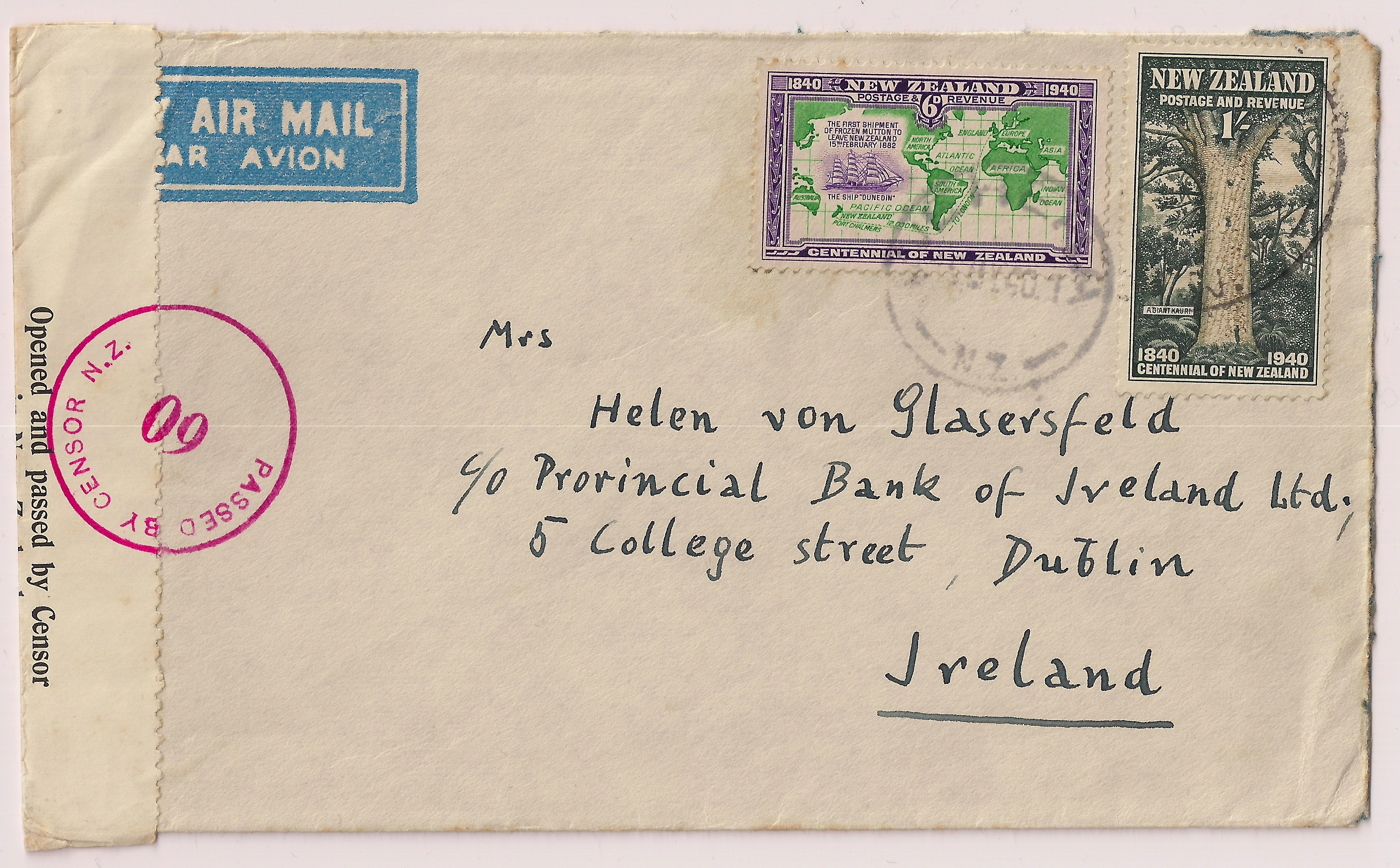
July 1940 New Zealand airmail censored cover paid 1/6 to Dublin, Ireland, flown from Auckland to Sydney by Tasman Empire Airways service that started on 30 April 1940, and then flown on the Horseshoe route to Durban, South Africa and then by boat to the UK for forwarding to Dublin

==== Auckland–Sydney ====
The inaugural Tasman service between Auckland's Mechanics Bay airport and Sydney's Rose Bay Water Airport on 30 April 1940 was flown by Aotearoa, one of its two Short S.30 flying boats. There was a connection at Sydney with the Qantas/BOAC Empire Air Route or Empire Air Mail Scheme to England which meant that there was, for the first time, a regular through-air service between New Zealand and England. That lasted less than six weeks, for it was no longer possible to fly through the Mediterranean when Italy entered World War II in June 1940. The Horseshoe route, between Sydney and Durban, South Africa (via Singapore, Calcutta, and Cairo) provided a solution.

The first four months of operation saw a weekly return service between Auckland and Sydney. This was expanded to thrice fortnightly with connections to San Francisco using Pan Am flights from Auckland (Pan Am was not flying into Australia). The connection to San Francisco ended in December 1941 when Japan entered the war.

In the first year, the annual report revealed that 130 trans-Tasman flights had been completed carrying 1,461 passengers for a profit, prior to tax and dividends, of NZ£31,479. By 1944, the trans-Tasman frequency had increased to three weekly return flights.

==== Wellington–Sydney ====
From 1940–1950, TEAL operated a single Tasman service, between Auckland and Sydney, with Short flying boats. From 1950 to 1954, Wellington was also linked by flying boat to Sydney. The intended Wellington–Sydney flying boat service commenced on 3 October 1950 with the departure of TEAL Short Solent IV, RMA Ararangi, from Wellington. It carried between 40,000 and 50,000 letters, mostly first-day covers, weighing 660 lbs and 86 lbs of second-class mail.

Wellington resumed international service, at first only to Sydney, in 1960

==== Christchurch–Melbourne ====
On 20 December 1950, 39–41 passengers on a British Commonwealth Pacific Airlines Douglas DC-6 airliner chartered by TEAL, left the recently dedicated Christchurch Airport on a direct flight to Melbourne, and what would become a regular TEAL air service relieving South Island from international air-service isolation. The DC-6, RMA Resolution, departed for Melbourne at 10:10 am, arriving 6 hours and 35 minutes later.

==== Christchurch–Sydney ====
From 1954, newly acquired Douglas DC-6 aircraft were introduced to a new Christchurch–Sydney service and the Auckland–Sydney service; TEAL now operating its own Christchurch–Melbourne and Auckland–Melbourne services.

==== Auckland–Brisbane ====
A service between Auckland and Brisbane followed in 1959.

==== Christchurch–Brisbane ====
A service between Christchurch and Brisbane followed in 1959.

=== Coral Route ===
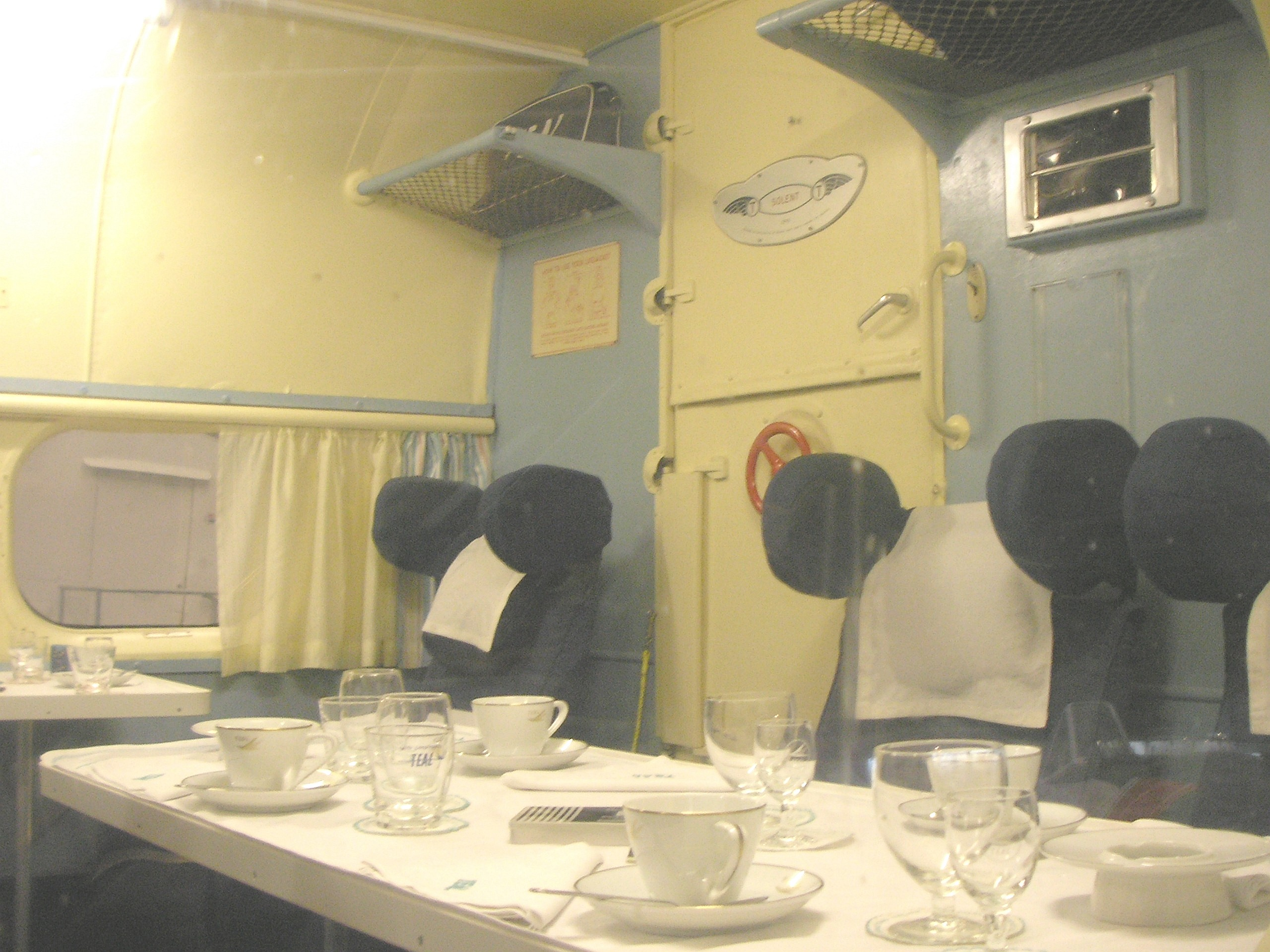
Interior of Teal Short Solent preserved at the Museum of Transport & Technology, 2007

The New Zealand National Airways Corporation had initiated Pacific Island flights flying Douglas DC-3 aircraft, from Auckland to Nadi (Fiji), Faleolo (Samoa), Aitutaki, and Rarotonga (Cook Islands). These routes were later taken over by TEAL, which wanted to fly to Tahiti, but there was no airstrip at Papeete, so a flying boat was necessary. After completion of a survey flight by a TEAL-operated ex-RNZAF Catalina ZK-AMP in 1951, the Coral Route flight from Auckland to Papeete, Tahiti, via Laucala Bay at Suva, Fiji, Satapuala at Apia, Samoa, and Akaiamai at Aitutaki in the Cook Islands, was inaugurated by TEAL on 27 December 1951, using the Short Solent flying boats long used between Auckland and Sydney. In Samoa, the plane landed on the sea and a small motor boat operated by Fred Fairman would carry the passengers to shore. They would alight and go through customs in a small shed. The Faleolo airport was still a grass strip.

A TEAL staff competition gave the route the name the Coral Route. The winning entry came from Eric Mullane, head steward, who was inspired by the beauty of islands (coral) and of the song-filled (choral) welcome that greeted visitors to the islands. It became the only air route into Tahiti, with Americans and others from Northern Hemisphere flying by landplanes into Nadi in Fiji, making the short trip across to Suva to join the flying boat at Laucala Bay, for its fortnightly flight along the Coral Route, leaving on a Thursday morning for Samoa, alighting on the Satapuala lagoon about 2:00 pm. Passengers were driven by cab through Samoan coastal villages to Apia, where they enjoyed respite and dinner at Aggie Grey's hotel until 2:00 am when they were driven back out to Satapuala for a pre-dawn take-off to the Akaiami lagoon at Aitutaki where they went ashore for breakfast and an optional swim until mid-morning takeoff for Papeete, timed to ensure that arrival was after the end of the siesta period at 2:00 pm. After launching ashore and completing Customs, passengers had to wait a further hour while their luggage was sprayed against horticultural pests, a time usually spent by the majority across the road from the Customshouse at Quinn's Bar. In all, a 30-hour leisurely introduction to life in the South Seas which made the Coral Route a legendary travel experience.

On 15 September 1960, the final Coral Route flight by the Solent Aranui returned to Auckland. It was one of the world's last long-range scheduled international flying boat services. Landplane flights were extended from Nadi, Fiji, to Pago Pago, American Samoa, and Papeete, Tahiti. In late 1964, the French cancelled TEAL's licence to Tahiti and the Coral Route service was terminated at Pago Pago. Air New Zealand was permitted to return to Tahiti in 1967.

=== Hibiscus Service ===
In 1954, TEAL replaced its Mechanics Bay, Auckland to Suva, Fiji, flying boat service, with Douglas DC-6 landplanes from Whenuapai to Nadi. The Hibiscus Service provided first and tourist-class travel, especially appealing to folk pursuing a Pacific island dream holiday.

=== Norfolk Island Service ===
The New Zealand National Airways Corporation ceased air mail, passenger and cargo services to Norfolk Island in early September 1955. TEAL resumed the regular air service from Auckland in November with four-engined Douglas DC-6 Skymaster aircraft. TEAL's service was initially weekly, then fortnightly.

== Fleet ==
=== Aircraft ===
TEAL operated flying-boats and landplanes:

==== Short S.30 Empire Class flying-boat ====
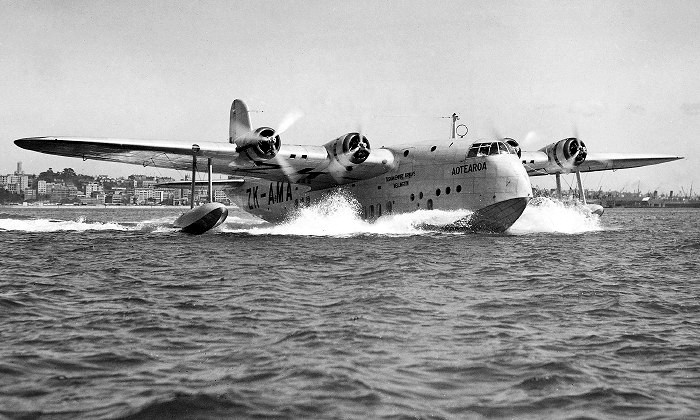
Short S.30 Empire: TEAL ZK-AMA Aotearoa at Auckland

The first services were flown by Short S.30 Empire Class flying boats. TEAL operated two of these between 1939 and 1947. They were given the Māori names, Aotearoa (long white cloud) for ZK-AMA, Serial S886, and Awarua (two rivers) for ZK-AMC, Serial S994. A third S.30 ordered by TEAL, Serial S885, was diverted to war duties in the North Atlantic and later destroyed.

The modern flying boat interior had been designed by New-Zealand-born British architect Brian O'Rorke, following the success of his interior design for the Orient Steam Navigation Company's RMS Orion in 1935. Imperial Airways had engaged O'Rorke in the interior design, planning and detail of their new airliners and flying boats.

==== Short S.25 Sandringham Mk IV Tasman Class flying-boat ====
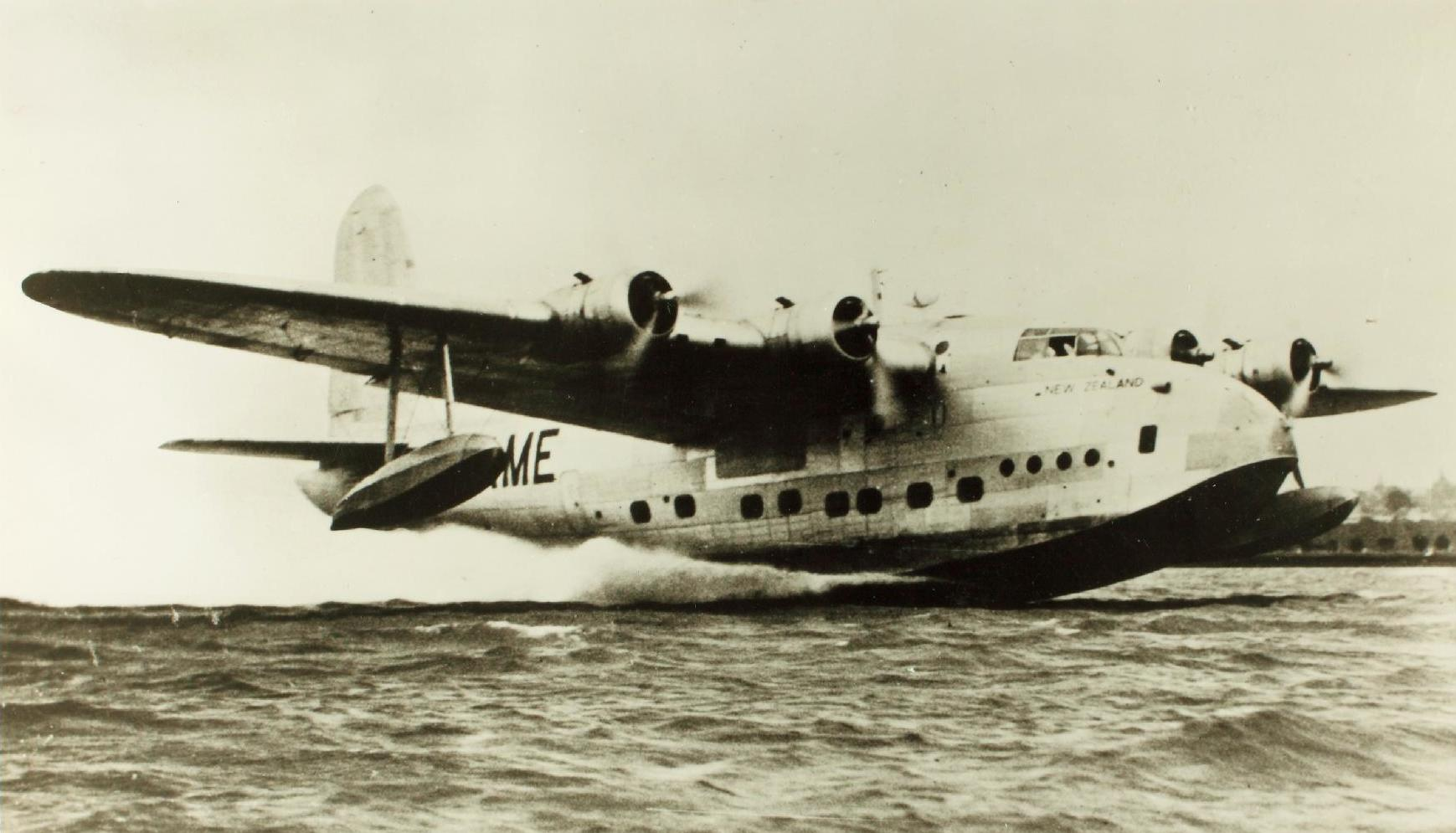
Short S.25 Sandringham IV, Tasman Class: TEAL ZK-AME New Zealand at Auckland

In 1946, TEAL acquired four Short S.25 Sandringham IV 'Tasman Class' flying boats. They were a fully streamlined conversion passenger transport variation of the Short Sunderland. Consideration was given to landplane operations but the government delayed the decision to move to land as the UK government offered generous terms on purchasing new types in development such as the Avro Tudor and Handley Page Hermes. The Sandringhams were given generic names, ZK-AMB Serial ML761 Tasman, -AMD Serial NJ255 Australia, -AME Serial NJ179 New Zealand, and -AMH JM715 Auckland. However they were unsuited for the harsher trans Tasman crossings. They were grounded for six months in 1948 due to engine cooling issues and disposed of at the end of 1949 when a more suitable custom built version of the Short Solent became available.

==== PBY Catalina|Consolidated Boeing PB2B-1 Catalina ====
TEAL flew two Boeing-built Consolidated PB2B-1 Catalinas, on loan from the RNZAF, for training and survey work from 1947 to 1949. They were registered as ZK-AMI and ZK-AMP Maroro (Flying Fish – TEAL's emblem) on the civil aviation list. ZK-AMI was never named.

==== Short S.45 Solent Mk IV flying-boat ====
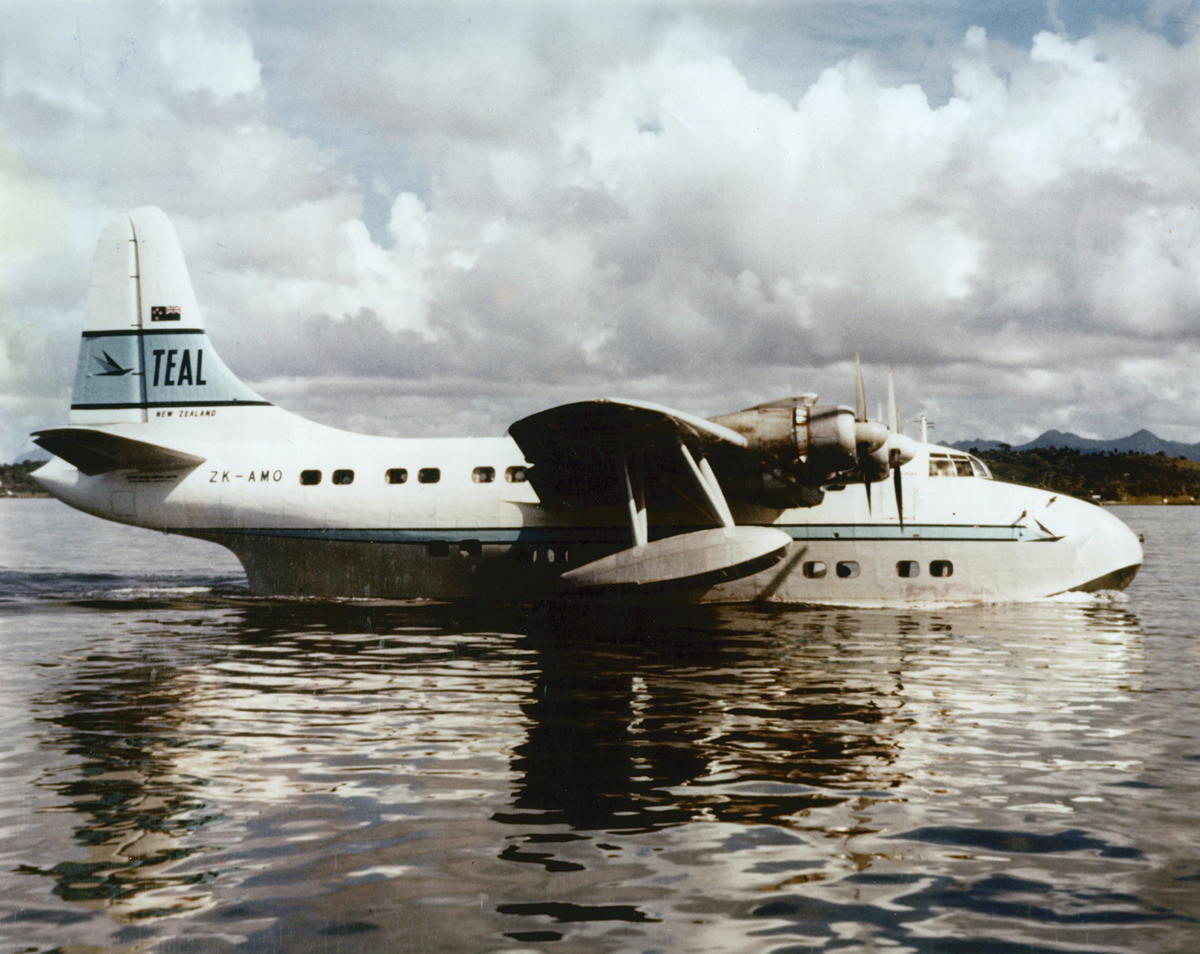
Short S.45 Solent IV: TEAL ZK-AMO Aranui, 1954–60 livery

The Short S.25 Sandringham IV was replaced by the Short S.45 Solent IV, of which TEAL acquired four—ZK-AML Aotearoa II, -AMM Ararangi, -AMN Awatere and -AMO Aranui. TEAL management were hoping to move to land based operations after the unsuccessful operation of the Sandringham. An original plan was to operate Douglas DC-4 aircraft from Auckland's Whenuapai joint service airport alongside other overseas international operators. However, a Buy British policy and support for rebuilding the British aircraft industry forced the airline to continue operating flying boats. Proposals to fly the mammoth Saunders-Roe Princess on a subsidised trial basis, and produce a six jet engine powered flying boat, the Saunders-Roe Duchess, to add jet speed to an already antiquated mode of air transport, were also considered. A New Zealand Government promise, that the Solent would be the last water based aircraft the airline would operate, ended any thought of future flying boat development in New Zealand. The Solents were delivered during 1949 with one setting a new trans-Tasman crossing record of 5 hours 37 minutes. With one exception, the Solents were withdrawn from service with the introduction of the Douglas DC-6 landplanes in 1954. The exception, ZK-AMO Aranui, continued flying the Coral Route from its base at Suva, Fiji, until 1960. TEAL introduced the landplane based Hibiscus Service to Nadi, Fiji.

==== Short S.45 Solent Mk III flying-boat ====
In 1951, TEAL purchased an extra Solent flying boat from BOAC to ease pressure on growing passenger numbers and help with the new Wellington based Tasman Service operating from Evans Bay. ZK-AMQ Aparima carried on in TEAL service until 1957, and on the Coral Route as the backup to ZK-AMO Aranui based at Suva, Fiji.

==== Douglas DC-6 ====
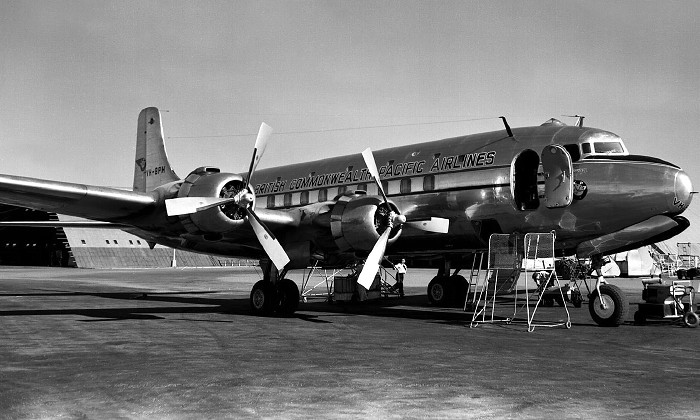
Douglas DC-6: BCPA VH-BPH Discovery at Brisbane. TEAL ZK-BGC Arahia from May 1954

The Douglas DC-6 was flown by TEAL between 1954 and 1961. Three were transferred to TEAL after the break-up of British Commonwealth Pacific Airlines (BCPA). Re-registered ZK-BGA Aotearoa III, -BGB Arawhata, and -BGC Arahia. They were original "short bodied" types fitted out with sleeper beds and long range tanks. The aircraft started replacing the flying boats service in May 1954. It meant the transfer of TEAL's Auckland International Airport operations from Mechanics Bay to the shared Whenuapai air force and civilian terminal, where it was to remain until 1965. In September 1956, Douglas ordered the re-skinning of all DC-6 wings. Work was completed on the fleet at Cathay Pacific's Hong Kong engineering facilities to allow a 2000 lb increase in payload. The landplane finally allowed TEAL to expand operations to Nadi, Fiji and from there directly to Tahiti. It also opened up landplane operations to Melbourne, helping move passengers during the 1956 Olympic Games and Brisbane. It also ended the leasing of a Trans Australian Airlines DC-4 operating out of Christchurch on behalf of the airline. Wellington's rebuilt Rongotai Airport handled its first DC-6 service just after it re-opened in 1959, ending trans-Tasman flying boat operations from nearby Evans Bay. Originally to be replaced by the Lockheed L-188 Electra in 1960, the DC-6 remained in service due to engineering issues for the Electra, until 1961. They were handed over to the Royal New Zealand Air Force to be used as troop transports, remaining in service until 1970.

==== Lockheed L-188C Electra ====
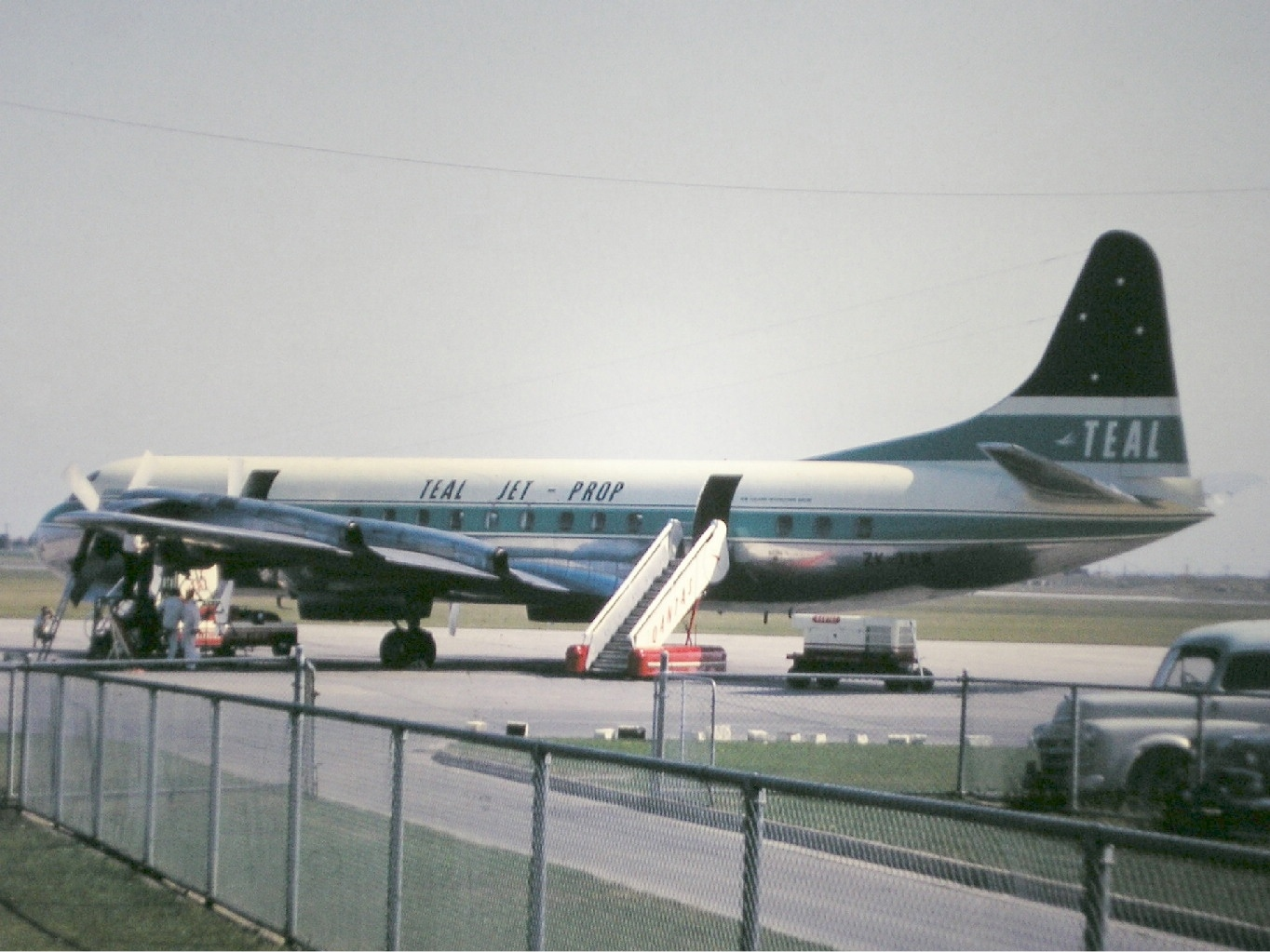
Lockheed L-188 Electra: TEAL ZK-TEB Atarau at Melbourne, 1964

The last new type to be operated by TEAL was the Lockheed L.188 Electra. Five of this type were operated between 1959 and 1972 by which time TEAL had changed its name to Air New Zealand. The airline wanted to introduce jet aircraft in the form of the Comet 4 airliner but Australian shareholders insisted on the Lockheed L188 Electra, citing that Qantas, Trans Australian Airlines, Ansett ANA and Hong Kong based Cathay Pacific had ordered the type. This would lower operating costs as all the airlines would be able to share a common parts pool with the Electra.

The original three were named Aotearoa IV (ZK-TEA), Atarau (ZK-TEB), and Akaroa (ZK-TEC). In late September 1959, just prior to delivery a series of fatal accidents occurred in the US with the new aircraft. It was discovered that propeller vibration caused a weakening of the wing to engine mountings. The Federal Aviation Administration ordered a reduced speed operation for the type until remedial repair works were completed in 1961. A fourth air frame was purchased from Qantas in 1965 to replace the lost air frame of ZK-TEC (see below), it was registered out of sequence as ZK-CLX but carried over the Akaroa name from the previous aircraft. By this time TEAL had changed its name to Air New Zealand. The fifth aircraft operated was leased from Qantas in 1970 for a year to operate a joint seat share service to Australia, Qantas titles appeared along the rear of the fuselage. This aircraft used the vacant TEAL allotted ZK-TED registration but remained unnamed. The remaining Electras were sold in 1972 to United States interests.

==== Douglas DC-8 Series 52 ====
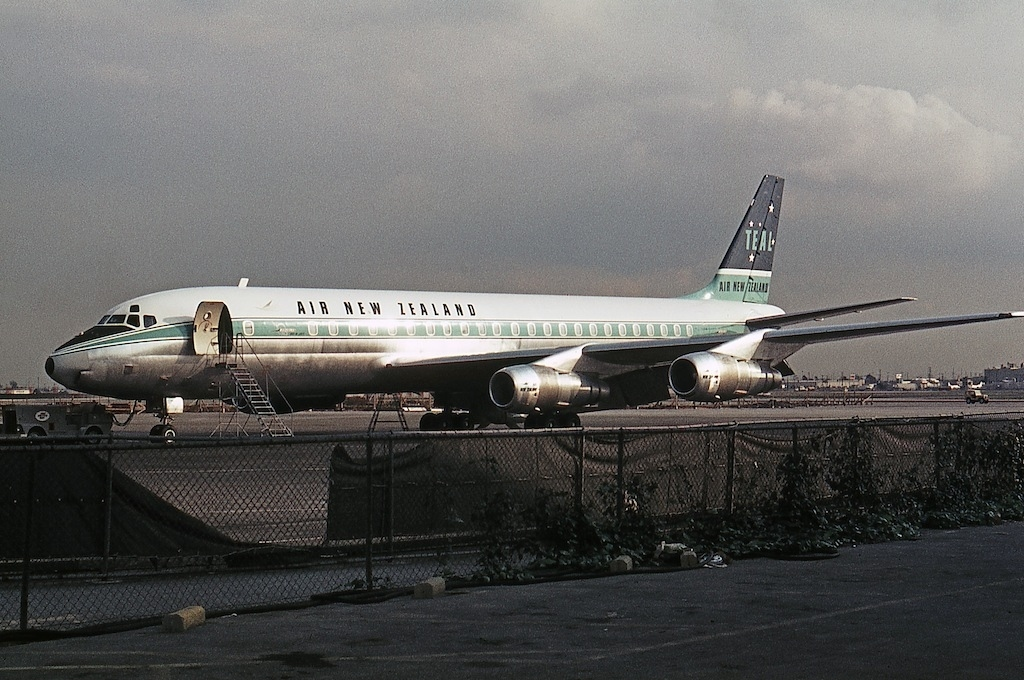
Douglas DC-8-52: Air New Zealand ZK-NZB at Los Angeles, 1965

On completion of the New Zealand Government's purchase of TEAL's Australian shareholdings in 1961, airline management promptly announced the purchase of pure jet powered aircraft for 1965. This was to coincide with the completion of a new International airport for Auckland and runway lengthening at Christchurch airport. Aircraft of interest included the Boeing 707–100 short bodied version operated by Qantas, Convair 880, Douglas DC-8, and after some political lobbying by pro-British government interests, Vickers VC-10. An offer by BOAC to lease surplus De Havilland Comet 4s to begin interim jet services immediately was turned down as uneconomical. After intense scrutiny of all types on offer, TEAL management approached the New Zealand Government for funds to purchase an initial three Douglas DC-8 Series 52 longer ranged jet airliners. The request was approved and an order placed in 1962 for delivery in early 1965. The aircraft were duly completed when TEAL announced a change of airline name on 1 April 1965 to Air New Zealand. The first DC-8 was already painted minus titles in anticipation of this. The aircraft never flying in actual TEAL service. After the name change, however, TEAL titles appeared on the tail fin of the new airliners for two years.

=== Powerboats ===
TEAL operated powerboats in support of flying-boats:

==== British Power Boat Company 37.5' Empire Control Tender ====
Designed by Hubert Scott-Paine for the transport of passengers using marine aircraft, the control tender arrived at Auckland on the MV Empire Star in June 1939 and was based at Mechanics' Bay. It was taken over by the Air Department during World War II.

==== British Power Boat Company 23' Auxiliary Launch ====
Designed by Hubert Scott-Paine for general purpose, particularly the transport of maintenance crew, gear and equipment, and light towing, the auxiliary launch arrived at Auckland on the MV Empire Star in June 1939 and was based at Mechanics' Bay. It was taken over by the Air Department during World War II.

==== TEAL 40' Express Launch ====
In consequence of the Air Department's acquisition of the two flying-boat support launches, TEAL commissioned Colin Wild of Stanley Point, Auckland, to build a 40' express launch named Tasmanair, primarily for the transportation of 25 staff and 2 crew between Mechanics' Bay and Hobsonville. It was launched on 24 July 1941. In TEAL service between 1941 and 1960, it had been based at Auckland, Laucala Bay, Fiji and Satapuala, Samoa. Following the withdrawal of flying-boats from the Coral Route in 1960, Samoa based Tasmanair was purchased by the New Zealand Government, transported to Lyttelton, New Zealand, where it was slightly modified, and shipped on to the Chatham Islands to support the RNZAF Sunderland flying-boat service at Te Whanga Lagoon.

=== Fleet survivors ===
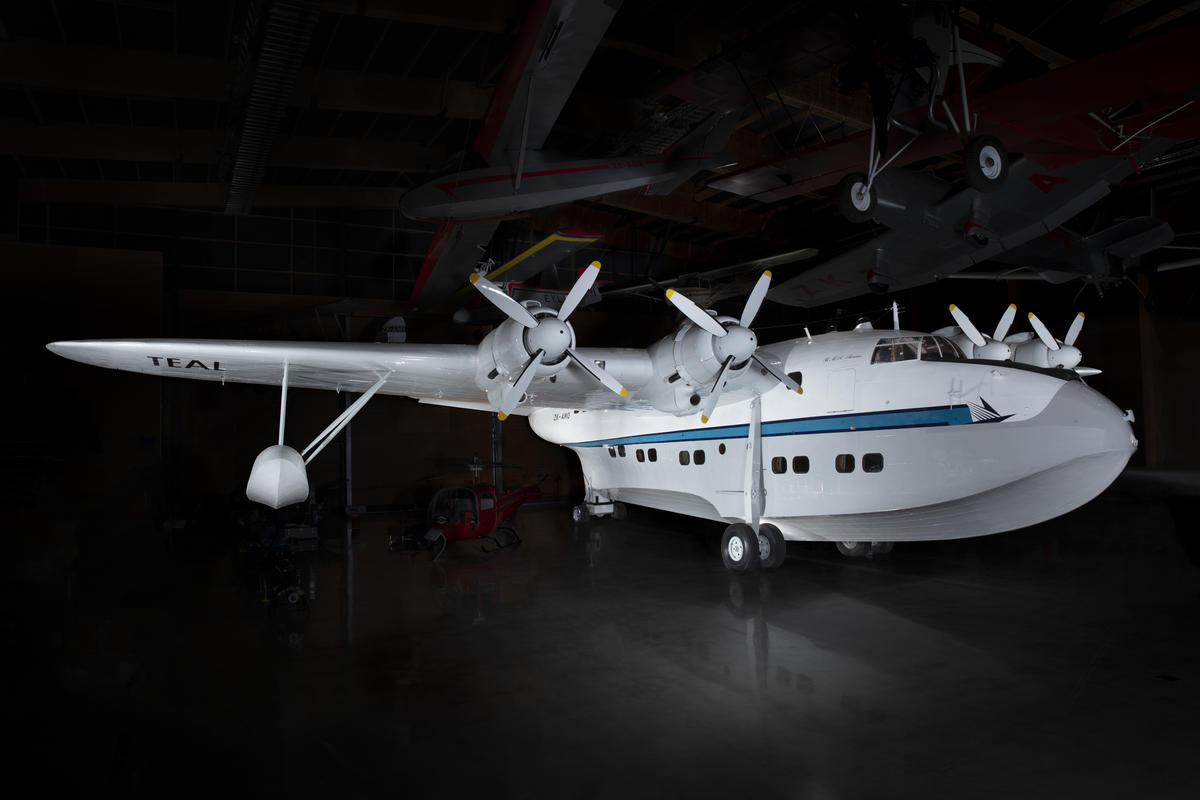
TEAL ZK-AMO RMA Aranui

Short S.45 Solent Mk IV flying-boat, TEAL ZK-AMO, RMA Aranui, was restored after years of remedial work by the Solent Preservation Society, a group of former Coral Route crew, engineers and mechanics established in 1982, and since 1990 has been on display at the Museum of Transport & Technology (MOTAT) in Auckland.

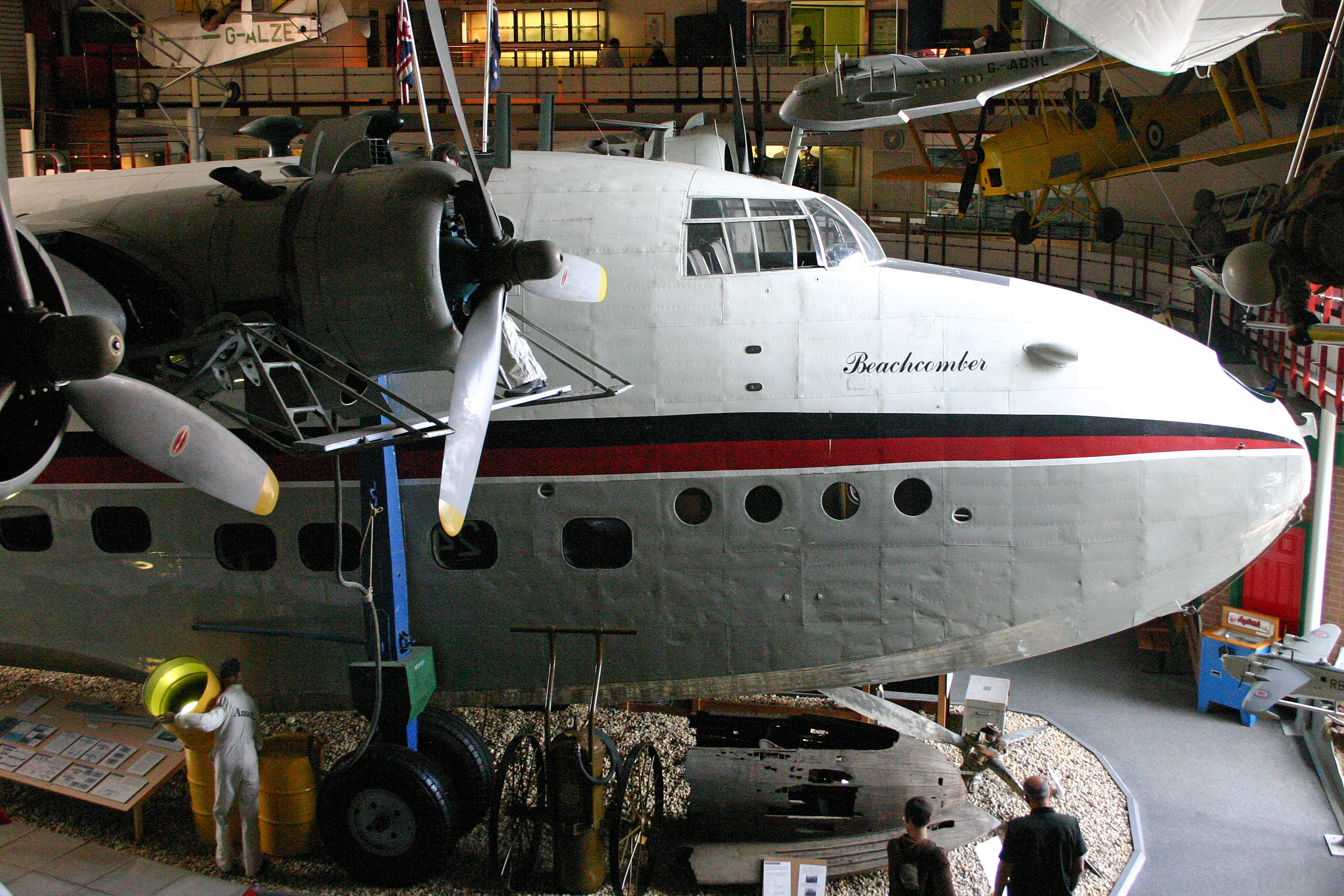
TEAL ZK-AMH RMA Auckland AFBS VH-BRC Beachcomber

Short S.25 Sandringham Mk IV Tasman Class flying-boat, TEAL ZK-AMH, RMA Auckland, formerly RAF serial JM715, which operated with TEAL from 1947 to 1950, is preserved and on display at Solent Sky aviation museum, Southampton, Hampshire, as Ansett Flying Boat Services VH-BRC Beachcomber, retired in 1981.

Lockheed L-188C Electra, TEAL ZK-TEB Atarau, is operational as a water bomber with Buffalo Airways, Canada

Douglas DC-8 Series 52, TEAL / Air New Zealand ZK-NZC, is derelict and stored at Manaus Airport, Brazil.

== Service ==
On board dining was a notable feature of the trans-Tasman and later, the Coral Route. The food was cooked from scratch on board. Morning and afternoon teas were prepared on board as well as hot meals. A dumbwaiter was used to provide access to the two decks of the flying boats.

The military look of the earliest uniforms reflected the era—the aftermath of war. The male stewards' uniforms were reassuring and gave the impression that flight crew could be expected to handle any situation. In 1946, women were appointed to the TEAL flying boat crew. Many had trained as nurses which was thought to be an ideal background for coping with any situation on board. In 1961, hostesses appeared in uniforms designed by Christian Dior and made locally by El Jay.

== Accidents and incidents ==
=== Lockheed Electra L-188 crash ===
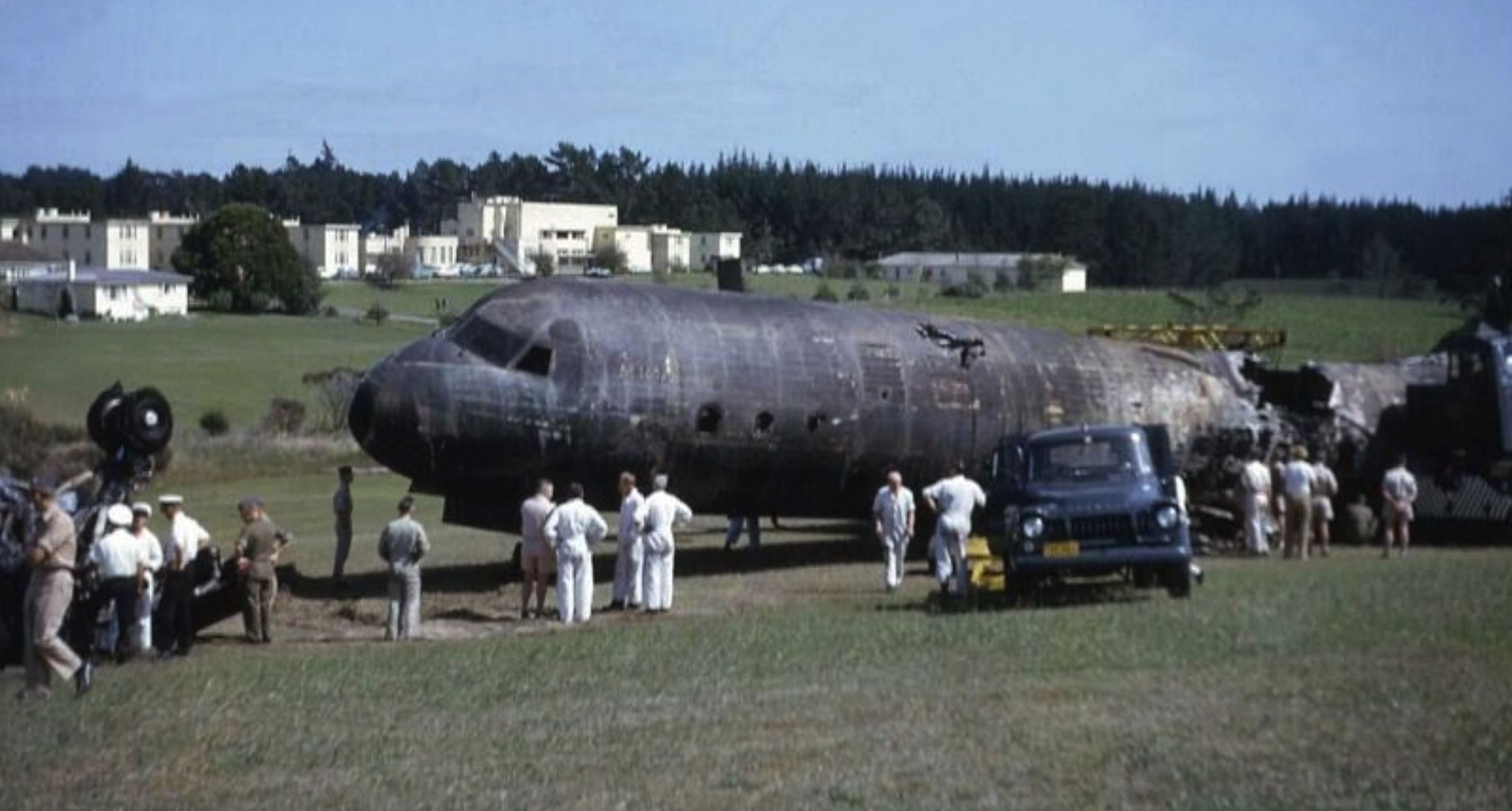
The wreckage of TEAL's Lockheed Electra at Whenuapai

On 27 March 1965, TEAL's Lockheed Electra L-188 ZK-TEC Akaroa, crashed during a training flight at Whenuapai. The airline had done the following manoeuvre many times before: the Electra, flying at precisely 140 knots, could be flown over the runway threshold, throttled back to idle to drop almost vertically and land on the runway. As this would never be done on a passenger flight; the reason for the procedure remains a mystery.

On board were a captain, a check captain, a flight engineer, a navigator; the airline's industrial personnel officer and an emergency procedures officer standing behind them.

As Akaroa's speed dropped below 140 knots the aeroplane landed very heavily, collapsing the landing gear; Akaroa shed wings, engines, tailplane and tail as it skidded off the runway and across the grass towards the control tower. Somehow, the two standing officers stayed standing, the fire extinguishers were turned on and everyone was evacuated through the cockpit windows, with one man burning his hand on the escape rope. TEAL salvaged what they could from the wreck and the remains were quickly pushed into a gully behind the NAC hangars before the public saw them. The crash took place in the early hours of the morning. The training procedure was quickly deleted from TEAL's manuals. TEAL purchased from Qantas a replacement Electra, VH-ECC, after it changed its name to Air New Zealand on 1 April 1965. It took the registration, ZK-CLX. At the time of the accident, ZK-TEC had the Air New Zealand logotype painted on its fuselage in anticipation of the name change.

== Ownership and change of name ==
In April 1961 the Australian government decided to concentrate its subsidies with Qantas that commenced operating its own trans Tasman services in October 1961, and sold its shareholding in TEAL to the New Zealand Government, giving it 100% ownership.

On 1 April 1965 Tasman Empire Airways Limited was renamed Air New Zealand Limited, with TEAL rebranded Air New Zealand, at the same time as the Douglas DC-8 entered service. TEAL's airline designator "TE" continued on with Air New Zealand until 1989. Thereafter, its international flights adopted the airline designator "NZ" formerly used by the New Zealand National Airways Corporation for its domestic flights.

== Chairmen ==
- 1940 Norris Stephen Falla
- 1947 Leonard Monk Isitt
- 1963 Sir Andrew McKee
- 1965 Sir Geoffrey Roberts

== See also ==
- History of Air New Zealand
- List of defunct airlines of New Zealand
- History of aviation in New Zealand
