= MacGregor (surname) =

MacGregor is a Scottish surname. The name is Anglicised form of the Scottish Gaelic MacGriogair. The Gaelic name was originally a patronym, and means "son of Griogar". The Gaelic personal name Griogar is a Gaelicised form of the name Gregory. The surname is used by members of the Scottish clan Clan Gregor, also known as Clan MacGregor.

The surname was banned in Scotland several times prior to the 18th century, in an effort to clamp down on the unruly clan.

== Notable people ==
- Alasdair Alpin MacGregor (1899–1970), Scottish writer and photographer
- Alistair MacGregor (born 1979), Canadian politician
- Andrew MacGregor (1897–1983), World War I flying ace
- Brad MacGregor (born 1964), Canadian ice hockey player
- Byron MacGregor (1948–1995), Canadian news anchor
- Chummy MacGregor (1903–1973), American jazz pianist and songwriter
- Clark MacGregor (1922–2003), U.S. politician
- Clifford J. MacGregor (1904–1985), American meteorologist and Arctic explorer
- Colin MacGregor (1901–1982), Chief Justice of Jamaica
- David MacGregor (born 1983), Scottish musician
- Douglas Macgregor (born 1947), American military writer
- Elizabeth Ann Macgregor (born 1958), Scottish curator and art historian
- Fulton MacGregor (born 1980), Scottish politician
- Graham MacGregor, British medical academic
- Gregor MacGregor (1786–1845), Scottish adventurer and confidence trickster
- Gregor MacGregor (sportsman) (1869–1919), Scottish cricketer and rugby union player
- Ian MacGregor (1912–1998), British industrialist
- Ian Macgregor (born 1937), British accountant and charity finance guru
- James Mor MacGregor (1695–1754), the eldest son of Rob Roy and a major during the rising of '45
- Joanna MacGregor (born 1959), British classical pianist
- John MacGregor (disambiguation), multiple people
- Judith Macgregor (born 1952), British diplomat
- Katherine MacGregor (1925–2018), American actress
- Kino MacGregor (born 1977), American Ashtanga Yoga teacher, author and influencer
- Mary MacGregor (born 1948), American singer
- Mary Esther MacGregor (1872–1961), Canadian author
- Molly Murphy MacGregor, American educator
- Neil MacGregor (born 1946), British art historian and museum director
- Norman MacGregor (1896–1981), World War I flying ace
- Robert Roy MacGregor ("Rob Roy", 1671–1734), Scottish outlaw and folk hero
- Sara Macgregor (died 1919), British painter
- Sue MacGregor (born 1941), British writer and broadcaster
- William MacGregor (1846–1919), British imperial administrator

== See also ==
- McGregor (surname)
