= Union Steamship Company =

Three shipping companies have borne variations of this name.

- The Southampton Steam Shipping Company was founded in England in 1853, became the Union Steamship Company and then the Union Line, and in 1900 merged with Castle Shipping Line to become Union-Castle Mail Steamship Company.
- The Union Steam Ship Company was founded in New Zealand in 1875 and later traded as the Union Line. It became a P&O subsidiary in 1917 and founded Union Airways of New Zealand in 1934. It developed various non-transport interests, became known as the Union Company, and ceased shipping operations in 2000.
- Union Steamship Company of British Columbia was founded in 1889 and taken over by Northland Navigation in 1962.
