= Malcolm C. McGregor =

New Zealand World War I flying ace

Malcolm McGregor
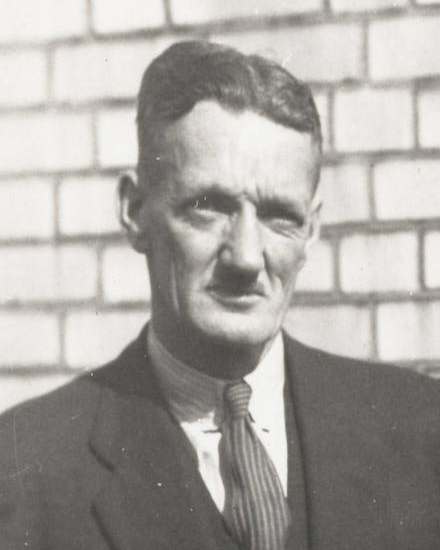
- McGregor in 1934
- Born: 4 March 1896; Vicinity of Hunterville, New Zealand
- Died: 19 February 1936 (aged 39); Wellington, New Zealand
- Military career
- Allegiance: New Zealand
- Branch: Aviation
- Rank: Squadron Leader
- Units: No. 54 Squadron RFC, No. 85 Squadron RAF
- Awards: Distinguished Flying Cross with Bar
- Other work: Aviation pioneer in New Zealand; long distance air racer

Captain Malcolm Charles McGregor DFC* (4 March 1896 – 19 February 1936) was a New Zealand born World War I flying ace. He was credited with 11 victories during the war. Postwar, he was an aviation pioneer in his home country, a competitor in intercontinental air racing and held the rank of squadron leader in the New Zealand Territorial Air Force.

Appointed a director, technical adviser and service manager for the new national airline, Union Airways which became NAC, he died in Wellington Hospital following a flying accident in a company aircraft just before his 40th birthday.

== Early life ==
Malcolm Charles McGregor was born near Hunterville, New Zealand on 4 March 1896 son of Ewen McGregor and his wife born Matilda Chubbin. He was educated at Hamilton Boys' High School. When grown, he was six feet three inches tall.

== World War I ==
MacGregor was granted his Aero Certificate in September 1916. On 7 April 1917, McGregor was appointed a Flying Officer in the Royal Flying Corps. His first aerial success came on 6 June 1917, while he was with 54 Squadron. He used a Sopwith Pup to destroy a German Albatros D.III fighter southwest of Cambrai, France.

He would not score another victory for almost a year. During this time, he survived being shot down. He was posted for a short time to No. 91 Squadron RAF. After transferring to No. 85 Squadron RAF to pilot a SE.5a, he drove down an enemy reconnaissance plane over Armentières on 29 May 1918. Three days later, on 1 June, he drove down a pair of Pfalz D.III fighters over La Gorgue, France. On 27 June 1918, he destroyed another German recon machine and became an ace.

On 24 July, he scored another double win southeast of Kemmel, Belgium, destroying one Fokker D.VII and driving another out of combat. On 3 August, he destroyed a Fokker D.VII. On 10 August, he was again shot down; again, he survived. Later in August, on the 22nd, he destroyed yet another Fokker D.VII. This was the action referred to when he was awarded the Distinguished Flying Cross, which was not gazetted until 2 November 1918.

On the 22nd August this officer displayed great gallantry and skill in an engagement between six of our scouts and a similar number of the enemy; all the latter were accounted for, Captain McGregor driving down one out of control. In all he has seven enemy aircraft to his credit—four destroyed and three driven down out of control.

McGregor would next turn balloon buster, destroying an enemy observation balloon east of Maretz, France on 8 October. He ended his string of triumphs by destroying another recon plane on 23 October 1918. His final tally was an observation balloon and five enemy airplanes destroyed, plus four planes driven down out of control.

== Postwar ==
McGregor was one of the officers awarded a Bar to his Distinguished Flying Cross in the King's Birthday Honours on 3 June 1919. He was discharged from the Royal Air Force on 17 July 1919. He returned to New Zealand to farm.

McGregor joined the New Zealand Territorial Air Force in 1921 where he was appointed Squadron Leader in 1930 No. 2 (Bomber) Squadron. He also took part in civil aviation activities. He ran a "barnstorming" operation, Hamilton Airways. He flew some pioneering airmail routes throughout New Zealand. In late April 1929, he participated in the New Zealand Air Pageant, entering a de Havilland Gipsy Moth from his Hamilton Airways.

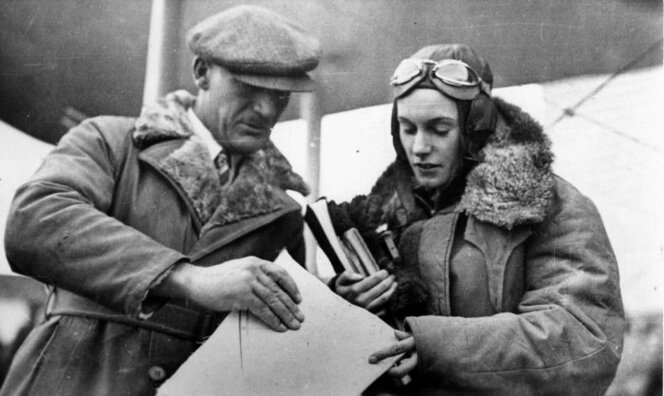
McGregor with Jean Batten, who made several record-breaking flights in the 1930s

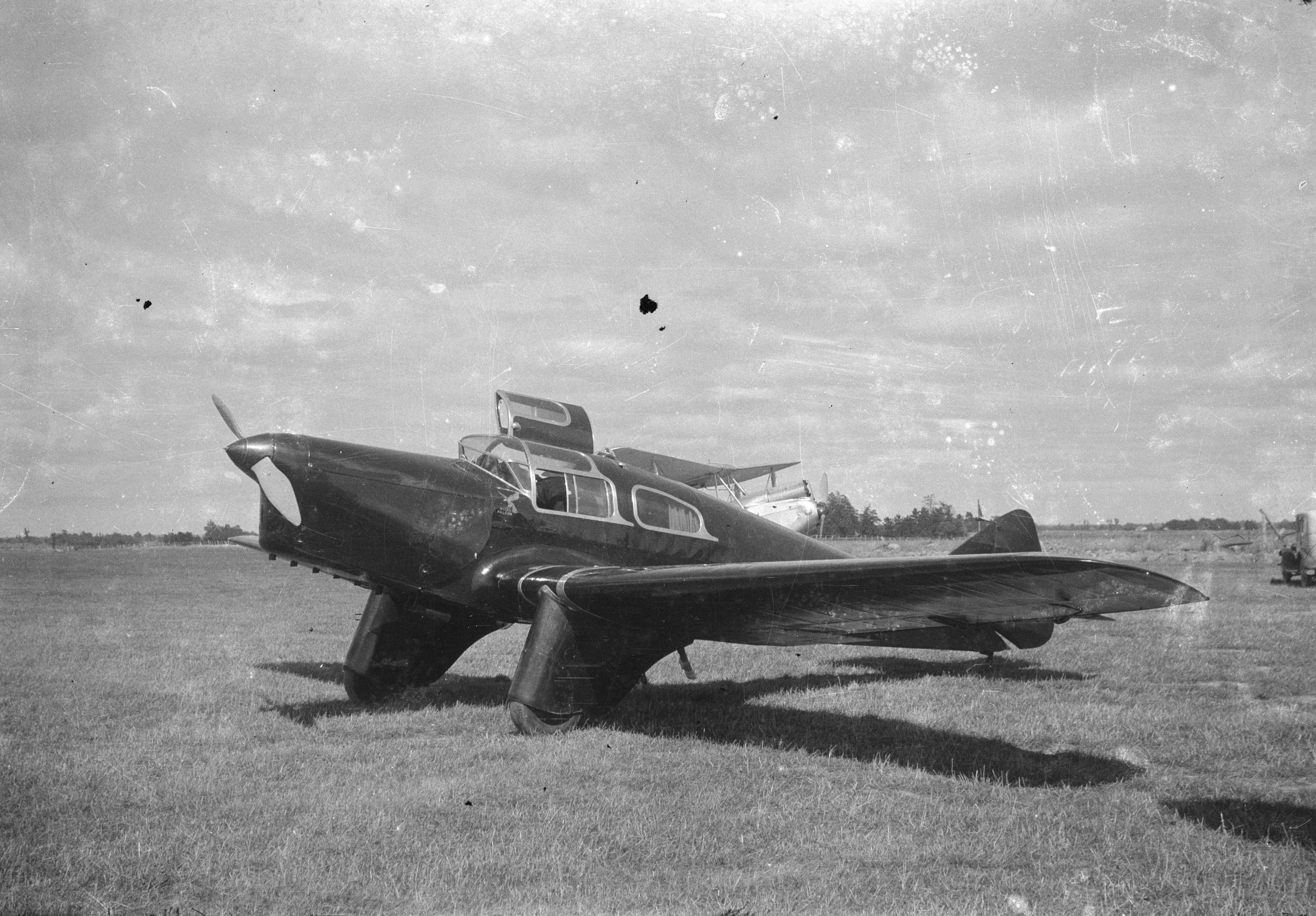
McGregor's Miles M-3B Falcon Major ZK-AEI at the Union Airways base at Milson near Palmerston North

=== The Great Depression ===
McGregor established Air Travel with Francis Maurice Clarke in 1930 with a De Havilland DH.50. It was New Zealand's first regular air service between main centres, Christchurch and Dunedin but there was not enough demand for the service at what turned out to be the beginning of the Great Depression.

By the end of 1931 he was reported to be carrying air mail from Invercargill, New Zealand to Auckland in a Simmonds Spartan. He was appointed chief instructor to the Manawatu Aero Club in 1932 but he broke his back in a crash in December 1932 while popping balloons at the Manawatu Aero Club's first pageant and spent almost a year in Palmerston North Hospital. By 1934, he had 3,300 flying hours in his pilot's log.

Entered by the Manawatu Aero Club with H. C. Walker he was one of the contestants in the MacRobertson Air Race in October 1934. He and his copilot completed the course, Mildenhall to Melbourne, in 7 days 15 hours, in a Miles Hawk Major.

Following the race he and F. Maurice Clarke sold their vision of a national airline to Norrie Falla, the new managing director of Union Steamship, and Union Airways was the result. Weeks after the new airline began scheduled flights he was killed in an air accident while piloting a taxi flight.

McGregor died in hospital after the wing tip of his fast Miles monoplane hit the anemometer mast in gusty weather while landing at Rongotai airport, Wellington, New Zealand on 19 February 1936.

McGregor was survived by his wife and their four children.
