= John MacGregor =

John MacGregor, John Macgregor or John McGregor may refer to:

== Sportsmen ==
- John McGregor (footballer, born 1851), Scottish international football player
- John McGregor (footballer, born 1900) (1900–1993), English football player
- John McGregor (footballer, born 1963), Scottish football player
- John MacGregor (rugby union) (1885–1940), Scottish rugby union player

== Politicians ==
- John McGregor (Upper Canada politician) (c. 1751–1828), businessman and political figure in Upper Canada
- John MacGregor (Glasgow MP) (1797–1857), MP representing Glasgow
- Jack McGregor (born 1934), American senator
- John MacGregor, Baron MacGregor of Pulham Market (born 1937), British politician, MP, and government minister
- John Malcolm Macgregor (born 1946), British diplomat, Ambassador to Austria, 2003–2007
- John MacGregor (Australian politician) (1828–1884), member of the Victorian Legislative Assembly in the 1860s & 70s
- John MacGregor (New Zealand politician) (1850–1936), New Zealand lawyer, politician and writer

== Others ==
- John Macgregor (1802–1858), Scottish shipbuilder
- John MacGregor (sportsman) (1825–1892), Scottish explorer, travel writer and philanthropist
- John MacGregor (VC) (1889–1952), Canadian recipient of the Victoria Cross, 1918
- John F. MacGregor (born 1943), Canadian statistician and chemical engineer
- John L. MacGregor, Canadian Scouts Movement official
- John MacGregor (artist) (1942–2019), Canadian artist
- Jon McGregor (born 1976), British contemporary author
