= Union Airways of New Zealand =

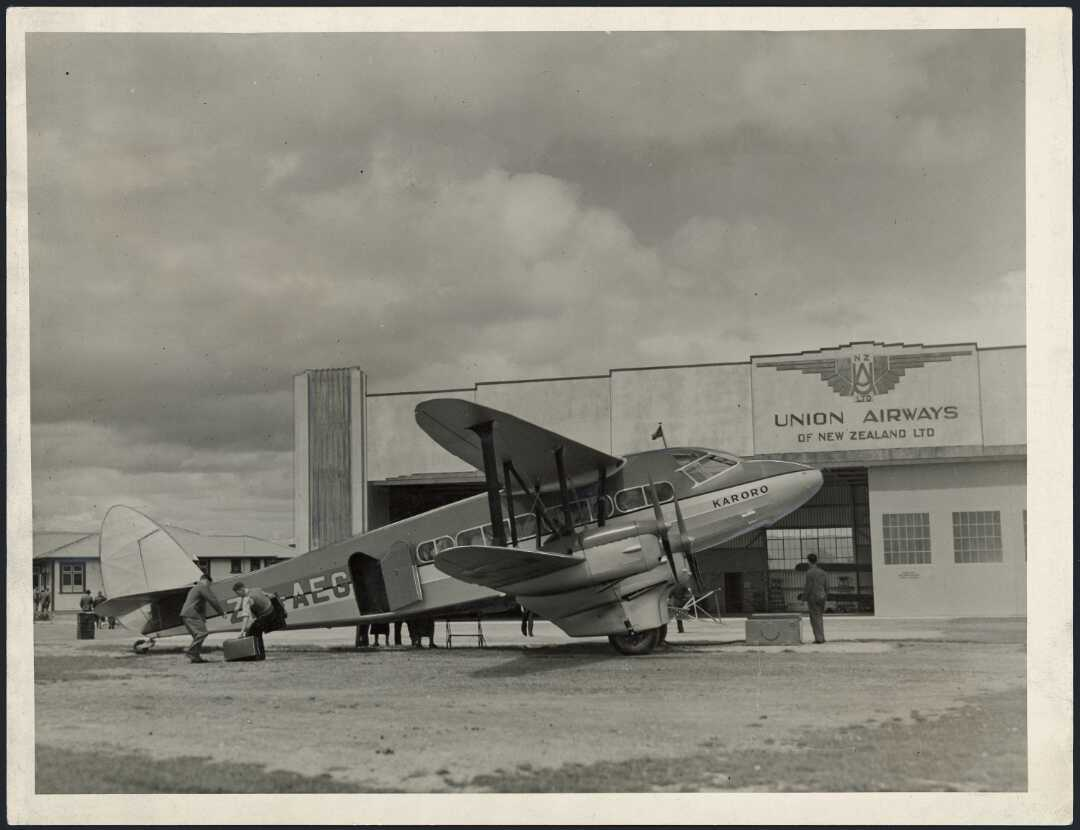
- Union Airways' Karoro at Milson in November 1936
- Founded: April 1935
- Commenced operations: 15 January 1936
- Ceased operations: 31 March 1947
- Operating bases: Mangere, Milson, Rongotai, Taieri
- Secondary hubs: Palmerston North
- Focus cities: Auckland, Wellington, Christchurch, Dunedin
- Alliance: ANA, TEAL
- Parent company: Union Company
- Headquarters: Dunedin
- Key people: F Maurice Clarke, Norrie Falla

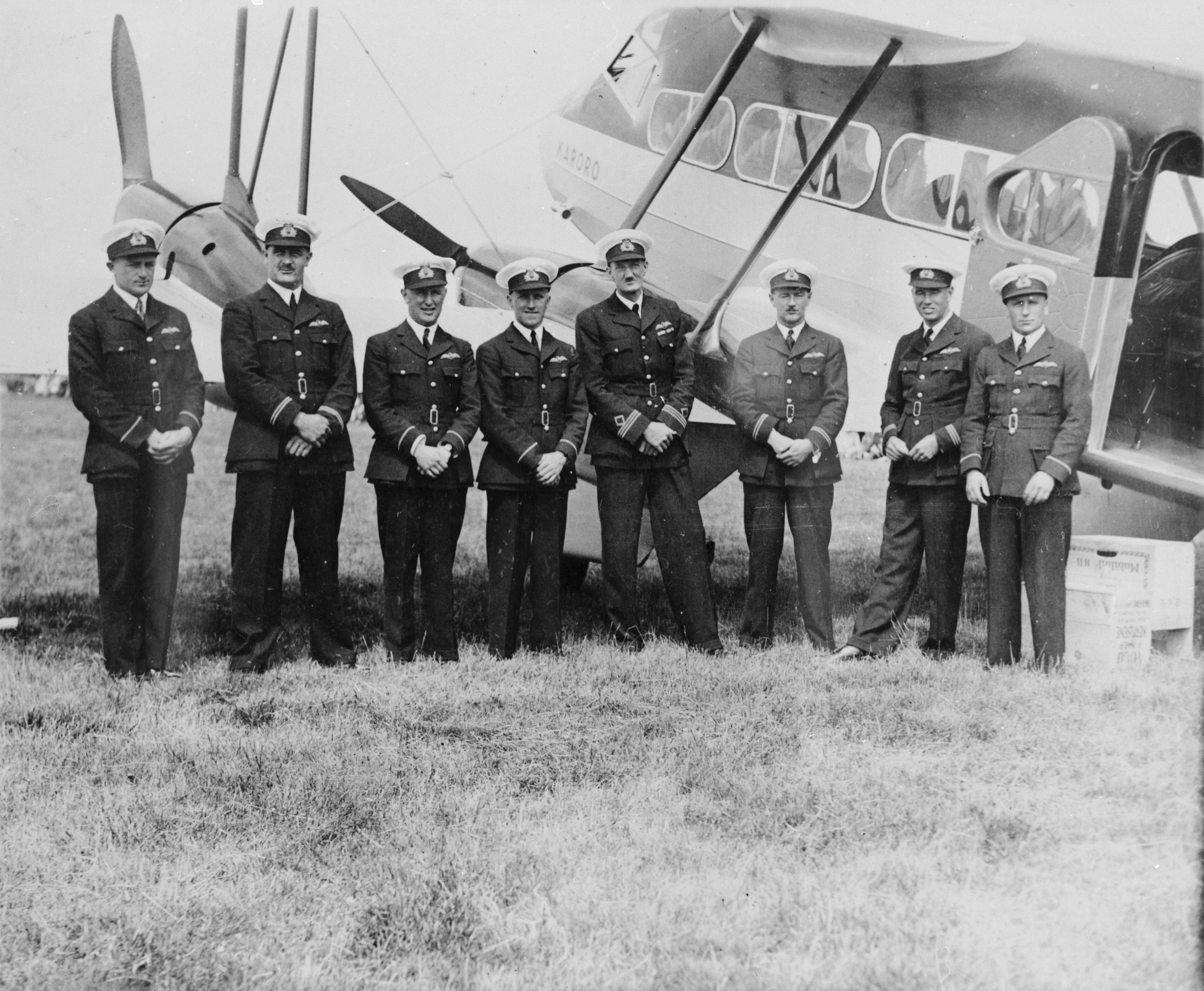
The pilots beside Karoro at Milson in January 1936

Union Airways of New Zealand Limited was New Zealand's first major airline. It was founded in 1935 by local shipping giant Union Company. Its services reached main centres from Auckland to Dunedin and extended to Gisborne and the West Coast of the South Island. Union Airways was instrumental in the establishment of Australian National Airways and Tasman Empire Airways Limited (TEAL).

In April 1946, the Government of New Zealand bought all the shares in Union Airways, later forming New Zealand National Airways Corporation which took over all Union Airways operations assets and facilities on 31 March 1947, adding them to those acquired from other local airlines.

== First scheduled passenger flight ==
'A new era for commercial aviation in New Zealand' announced the Manawatu Standard. The Postmaster-General christened Kotuku, Karoro and Korimako at the Milson Aerodrome following a civic luncheon on the afternoon of 15 January 1936 and Karoro with Flight-Lieutenant A. G. Gerrand at the controls flew the first passengers to Dunedin.

== Management ==
Managing Director: Norrie Falla; manager: Francis Maurice Clarke (initially technical adviser to the company); service manager: Squadron Leader Malcom McGregor; secretary C. T. Jarvis. McGregor died in hospital after the wing tip of his fast Miles monoplane hit the anemometer mast in gusty weather at Rongotai airport just a month after the start of scheduled services. Clarke was appointed general manager in May 1940.

From 1937 Clarke and Falla had been planning Tasman Imperial Airways later known as TEAL.

Falla died suddenly in 1945. He was replaced by James Norman Greenland, general manager of Union Steamship since 1936. It was announced in August 1946 that the government had bought Union Airways as of 1 April 1946. Clarke remained acting general manager and was appointed general manager of the government's new National Airways Corporation on 29 November 1946. Clarke's career had been: Wellington manager J J Niven & Co in 1920 followed by a spell in advertising with Goldberg then J Inglis Wright. Clarke established Air Travel with Squadron Leader McGregor in 1929, New Zealand's first regular air service between main centres. The Government of New Zealand suggested selling NAC back to Union Airways in 1950 but nothing came of it.

== Licence ==
In March 1935 Union Company, subsidiary of P&O, applied to New Zealand's Transport Coordination Board for a licence (Note: Transport Coordination Board was formed in 1933 under 1931's Transport Licensing Act. It was intended to limit entry to the transport industry to protect the heavy but unprofitable investment in the nation's railways then owned by its taxpayers. The board was closed in 1936. (Transport Coordination, The 1966 Encyclopaedia of New Zealand)) to operate a national trunk airline service together with three other companies: New Zealand Airlines of New Plymouth; Dominion Airways of Auckland (together they were Great Pacific Airways); and New Zealand Airways of Dunedin. The facilities at Rongotai being inadequate it was proposed the service would operate between Auckland, Milson (Palmerston North), Blenheim, Christchurch and Dunedin. In May having won a first licence to fly between Palmerston North and Dunedin (calling at Blenheim and Christchurch) Union Steam formed Union Airways Limited keeping for itself 600 of the planned issue of 1,000 shares. The new Great Pacific Airways covered the rest of the North Island though, again, not Wellington and shared the South Island calls. There were strong protests from the Wellington resident Coordination Board member. Licence applications for other routes from other sponsors were firmly opposed by Union Steam.

=== Government subsidy ===
The general public seemed unaware that no other country had commercial flying services without government subsidy. Only in the United States were military and civil aviation clearly separated, though civil was still subsidised. For its Brisbane-Darwin-Singapore service operating the same DH86 aircraft, Qantas received a greater subsidy per mile than proposed for the trunk route. The board had been directed to take into account the value of the usefulness of all the proposed airways facilities for auxiliary defence purposes.

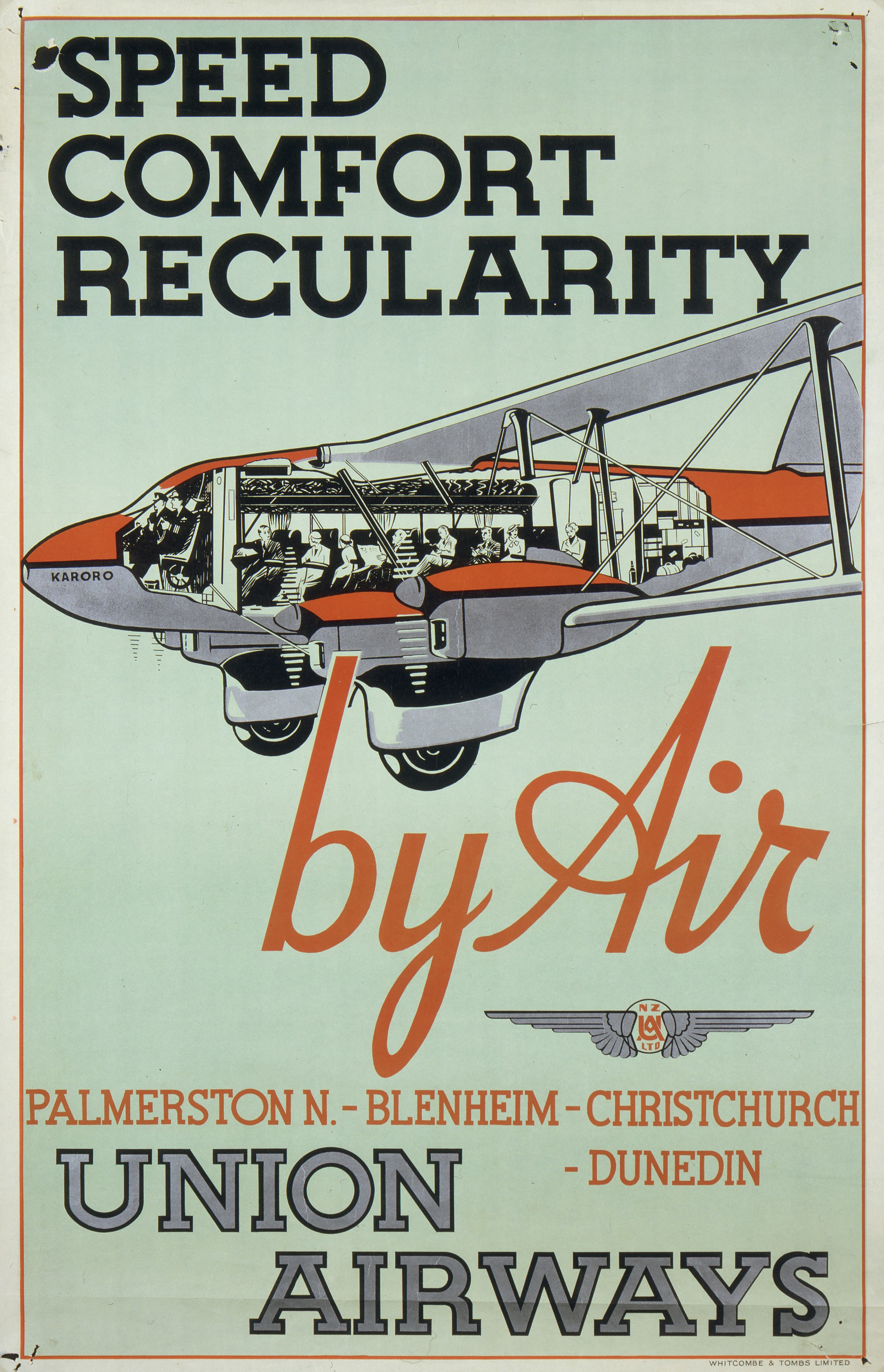
De Havilland DH86 Express Karoro

== Aircraft ==
Union Airways purchased three four-engined De Havilland DH86 airliners which could carry from ten to fourteen passengers together with ample mail and baggage space. Delivery took place in September and October and they entered service in December 1935 cruising at 145 to 150 miles per hour.

A Miles Falcon single engined monoplane designed to carry a pilot and two passengers was bought in Reading, Berkshire in August for service or, in emergency, air taxi work. It was to be fitted with the larger 6-cylinder 200 h.p. Gipsy engine used in the new DH86 aircraft.

In November and December 1935 the new aircraft were assembled in a new hangar at Wigram Aerodrome. Their names were reported to be Karoro, Kotuku and Korimako

=== Australia ===
At the same time Union Airways let it be known they planned a further service to Australia which they considered a natural development for a shipping company.

=== Union Airways fleet ===
Aircraft	Introduced	Retired	Notes
De Havilland DH.60 Gipsy Moth	1942	1947	One aircraft. Transferred to NAC in 1947.
De Havilland DH.84 Dragon 2	1938	1939	Two aircraft. Impressed into military service with the Royal New Zealand Air Force.
De Havilland DH.86 Express Airliner	1935	1946	Four aircraft. Impressed into military service with the Royal New Zealand Air Force.
Lockheed Model 10A Electra	1937	1947	Seven aircraft. Transferred to NAC in 1947.
Lockheed Model 18-56 Lodestar	1943	1947	13 aircraft. Transferred to NAC in 1947.
Lockheed Hudson III	1945	1946	One aircraft. Returned to the Royal New Zealand Air Force in 1946.
Miles M.3B Falcon Six	1935	1936	One aircraft. Crashed at Rongotai 19 February 1936

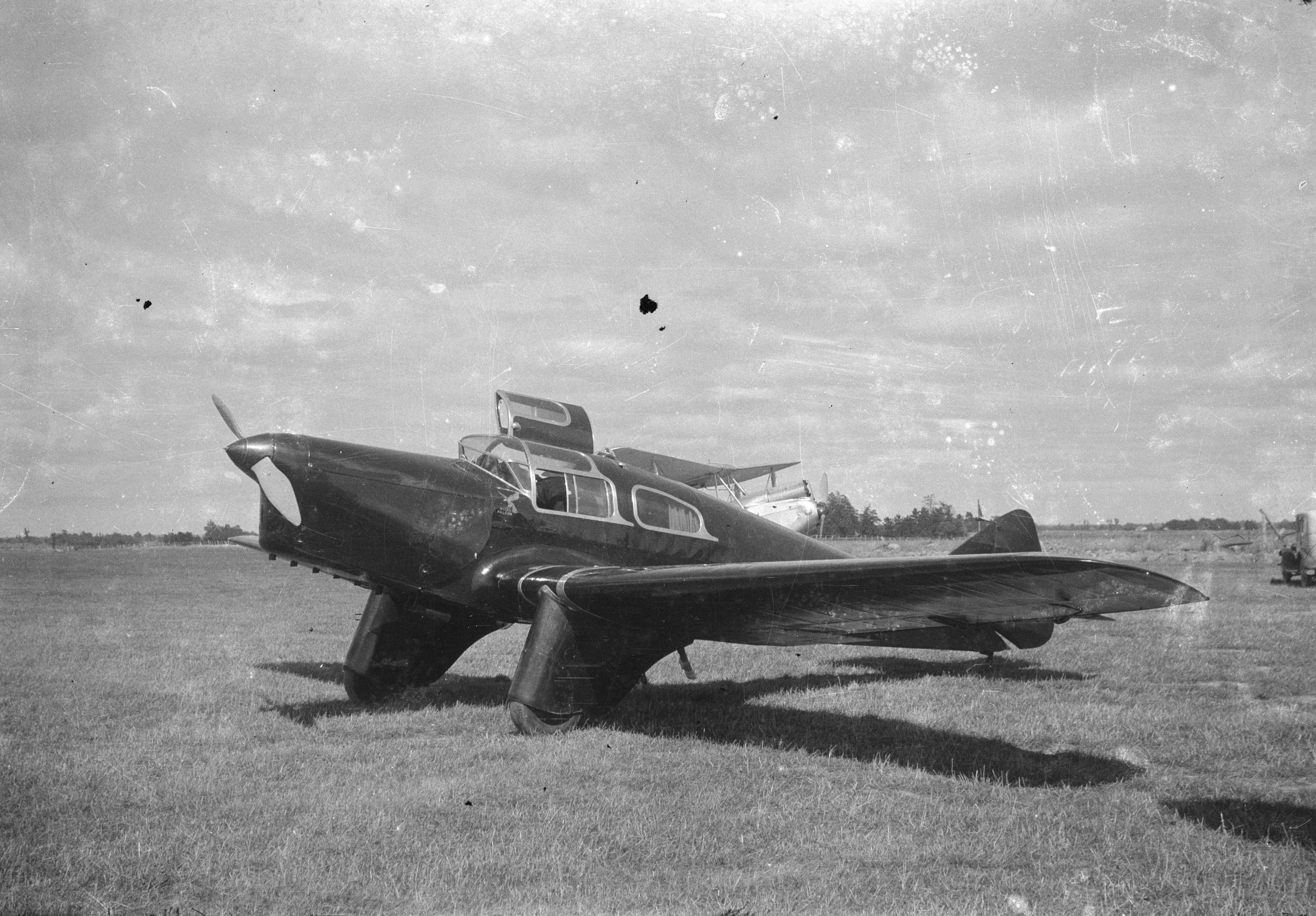
Miles M-3B Falcon Major ZK-AEI, Milson Airport. At that time NZ's fastest aeroplane Union Air intended it for service and taxi work

== Battle of routes ==
Meanwhile, through the Transport Coordination Board, Union Airways with its commercially strong backing blocked and continued to block the other airline, Great Pacific, from landing at Palmerston North leaving the Gisborne-Hawkes Bay feeder airlines with a restricted service. Their passengers would have to travel north by rail. Union Airways under their postal contract collected mail from the overnight Limited Express train at Palmerston and took it to the South Island and required no air link to Auckland. The board "caused perturbation" in the North Island by noting the most important trunk route would be between Palmerston North and Dunedin. Later newspapers produced articles about the working time saved by an Auckland businessman heading for Christchurch and travelling to Palmerston North by overnight train when compared with a flight originating in Auckland the following morning which would land him in Christchurch much later that day.

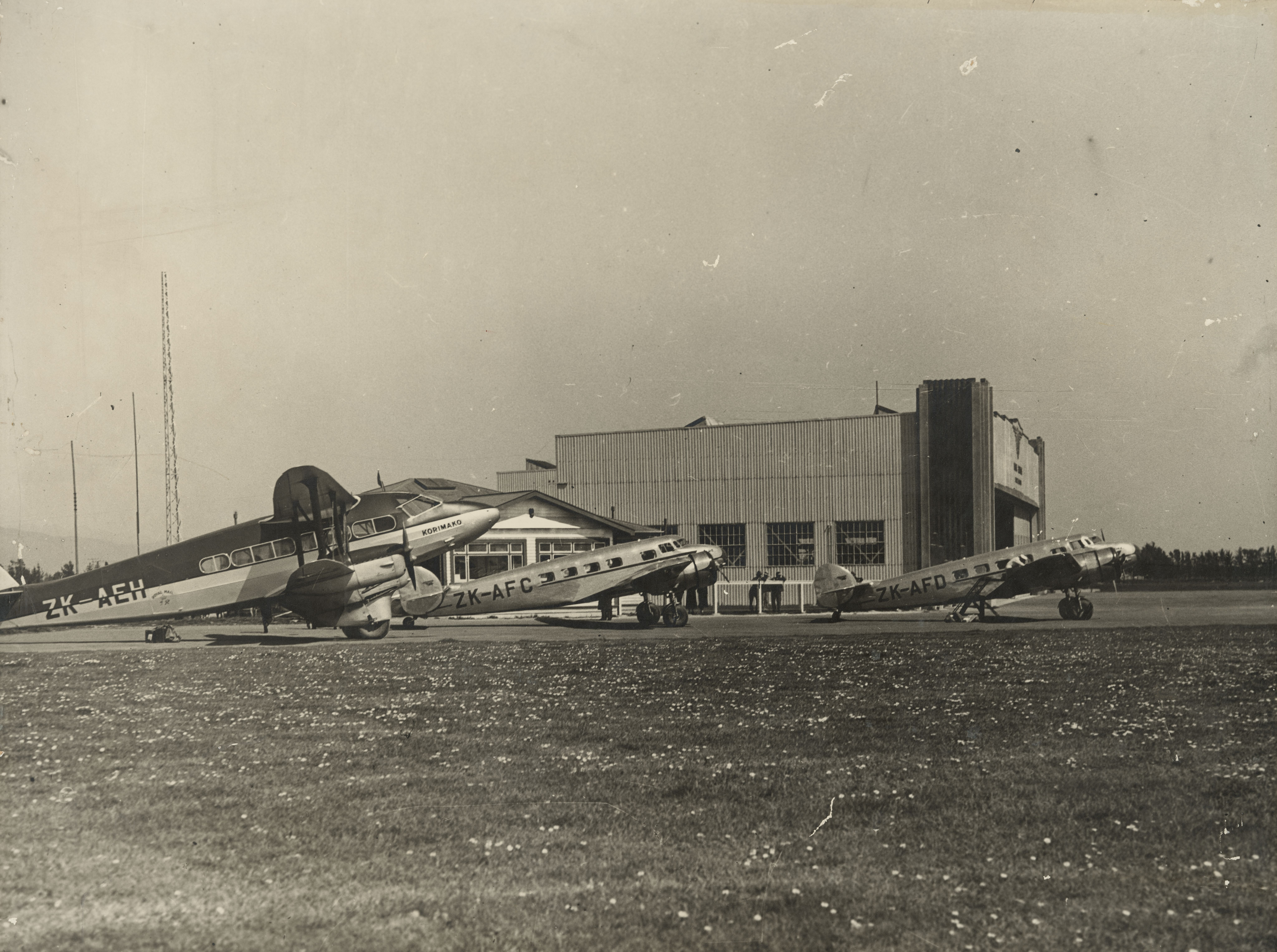
Korimako, Kotare and Kuaka at Milson circa 1938

New Zealand Airways, operators of a scheduled service from Wellington to Blenheim, lost their licence to the route to Cook Strait Airways and were reduced to taxi work. In response to questions put by Walter Nash in parliament the Minister responded that while New Zealand Airways had talked of raising a large sum of new capital and replacing obsolete aircraft "the backing of Union Airways was very substantial". The decision had been made by the board said Gordon Coates.

== Cook Strait Airways ==
Cook Strait Airways was established in 1935. Flying from Wellington to Blenheim and Nelson. It was disestablished in 1939, after the outbreak of World War II.

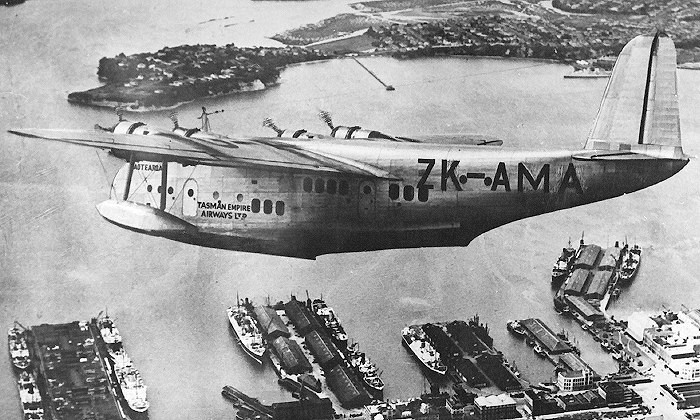
Aotearoa April 1940

=== Fleet ===
- 2 De Havilland Dragon Rapide

== Scheduled services ==
The first scheduled flight was from Dunedin to Christchurch on Wednesday 15 January 1936. The passenger were the mayor of Dunedin, Union Company's Dunedin manager, New Zealand Shipping Company's Dunedin manager, two officials of the Dunedin Aero Club and two other representatives of commercially interested parties.

== Union Airways support locations in 1945 ==
- Union Airways: Mangere, Milson, Rongotai and Taieri
- TEAL: Mechanics Bay and Hobsonville
- Air Travel: Hokitika

== Christmas 1945 and nationalisation ==
By the end of 1945 the government's intention to create a national airways corporation to monopolise civil aviation services had become The New Zealand National Airways Act.

Seven days out from Christmas the Auckland Star reported there were between 1,300 and 1,400 New Zealanders in Australia awaiting transport home, most of them servicemen and dependents. Between 700 and 800 people are registered in Auckland with Tasman Empire Airways as passengers for Australia. These people have obtained permits for this travel so they will have valid reasons for their bookings. Shipping companies held similar waiting lists. The mail service across the Pacific had ended so letters now went through the Middle East. Trains were booked out and Union Airways reported it was unlikely to be able to provide a seat out of Auckland until early February.

On the other hand, the Royal New Zealand Air Force's flying boats, large and small, Lodestar and Dakota transports and the pilots to fly all of them and the necessary ground crews.

== NAC ==
New Zealand National Airways Corporation began business on 1 April 1947. The general manager of Union Airways took the same role in the new NAC. The aircraft, timetables and support services and most personnel were simply moved to the new operation.

Examples of National Airways Corporation livery:

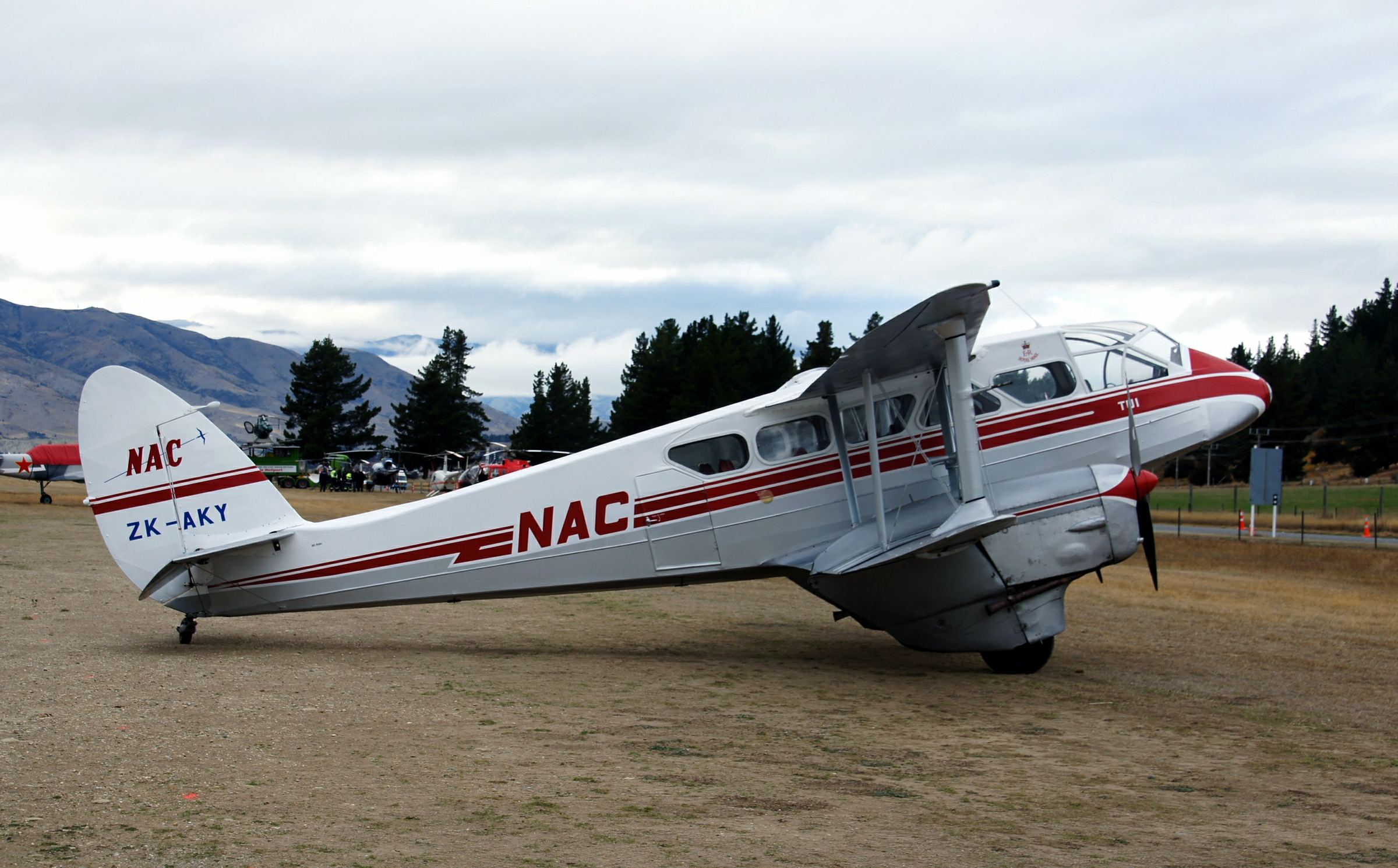
Tui De Havilland DH89 Dominie Luggate

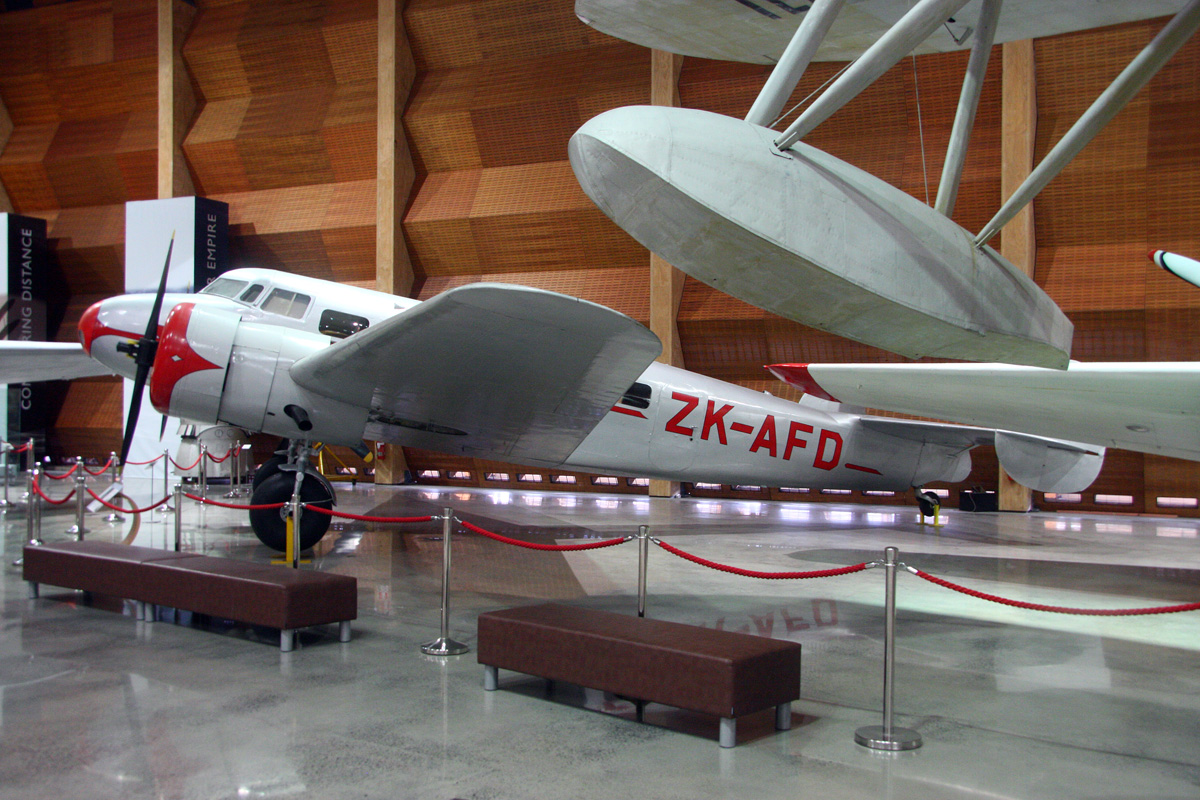
Lockheed Electra in Museum of Transport & Technology

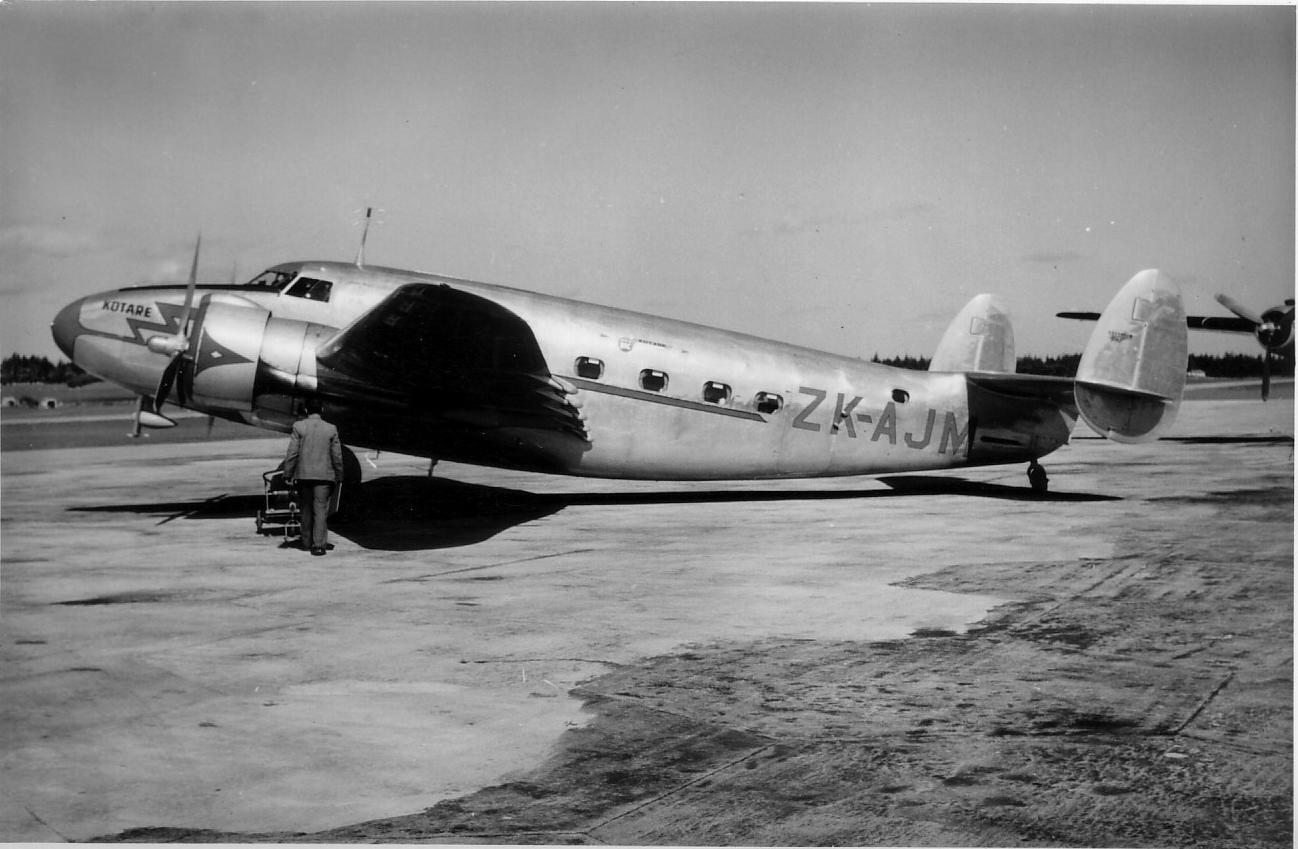
Kotare Lockheed Lodestar
