= John McGregor (footballer, born 1900) =

English footballer

Personal information
- Date of birth: 2 August 1900
- Place of birth: Darlington, England
- Date of death: 9 December 1993 (aged 93)
- Place of death: York, England
- Position: Right-back

Senior career*
Years	Team	Apps	(Gls)
- Royal Navy
1930–1932	Gillingham	68	(2)
1932–1933	Crystal Palace	4	(0)
- * Club domestic league appearances and goals

John McGregor (2 August 1900 – 9 December 1993) was an English professional footballer who played as a right-back. He played for Gillingham and Crystal Palace between 1930 and 1933.
