= SS Helen McGregor =

Boilers exploded 1830 at Memphis TN

The SS Helen McGregor was an American steamboat. Her boilers exploded on February 24, 1830, in Memphis, Tennessee. The reported death toll ranged from 30 or 40 to 60. She had been docked at a wharf to pick up and discharge passengers; several of those killed were on the dock. More the 270 people had died various in steamship boiler explosions beginning in 1825; after the Helen McGregor the United States Congress asked "the secretary of the Treasury to investigate the boiler accidents."

An account of the accident was published on March 22, 1830 in the United States Telegraph, and was reprinted in the May 29, 1830 Texas Gazette. From the account:

"I recollect looking at my watch as I passed the gangway. It was half past eight o'clock. A great number of persons were standing on what is called the boiler deck, being that part of the upper deck situated immediately over the boilers. It was cowded to excess, and presented one dense mass of human bodies...The number of passengers on board, deck and cabin united, was between four aned five hundred. I had almost finished my breakfast when the pilot rung his bell for the engineer to put the machinery in motion. The boat having just shoved off. I was in the act of raising my cup to my lip, the tingling of the pilot bell yet on my ear, when I heard an explosion, resembling the discharge of a small piece of artillery..."
