= Horseshoe route =

Flying boat route between Sydney, Australia, and Durban, South Africa

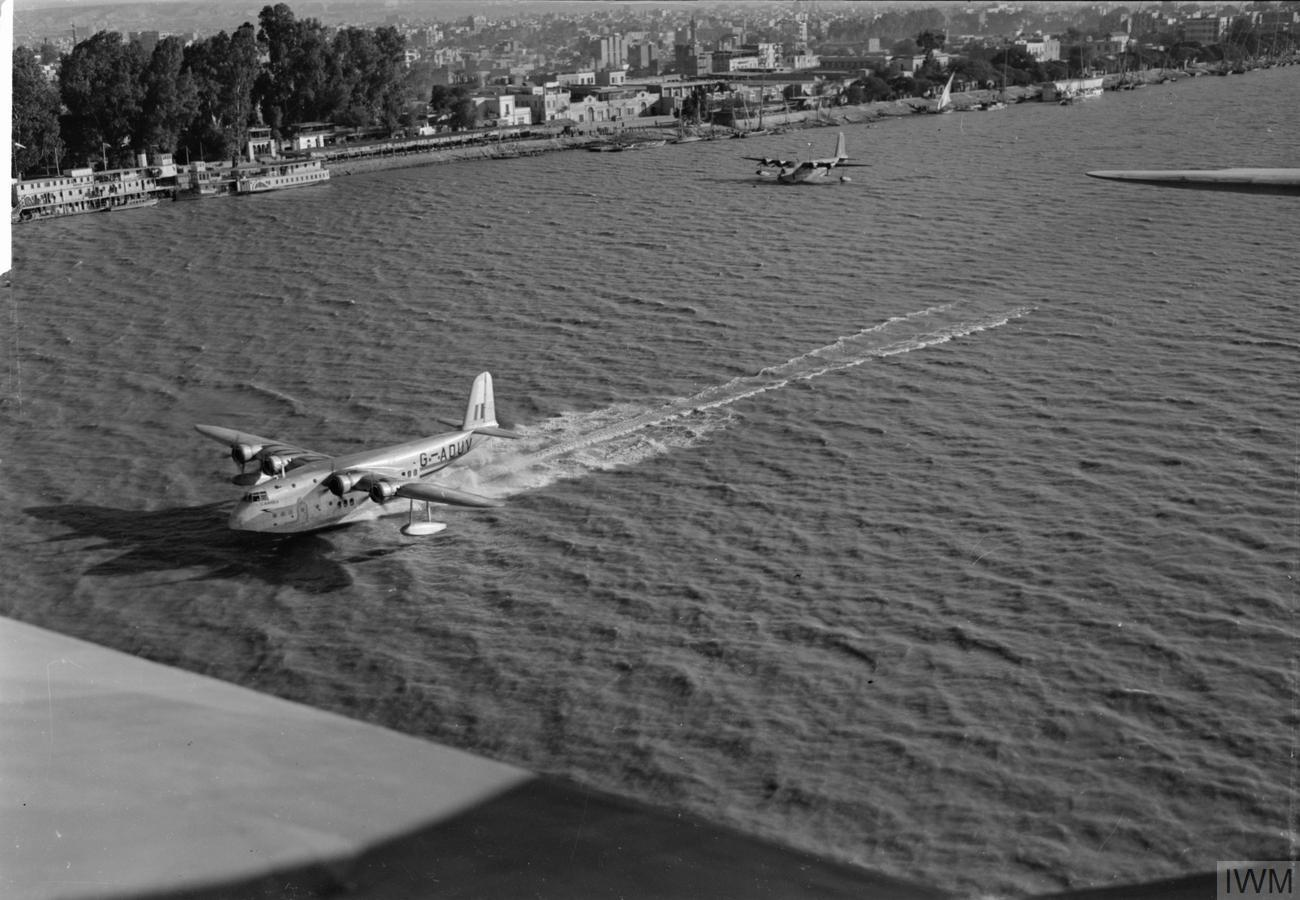
Short Empire S23 flying boat taking off from Rod El Farag, Cairo

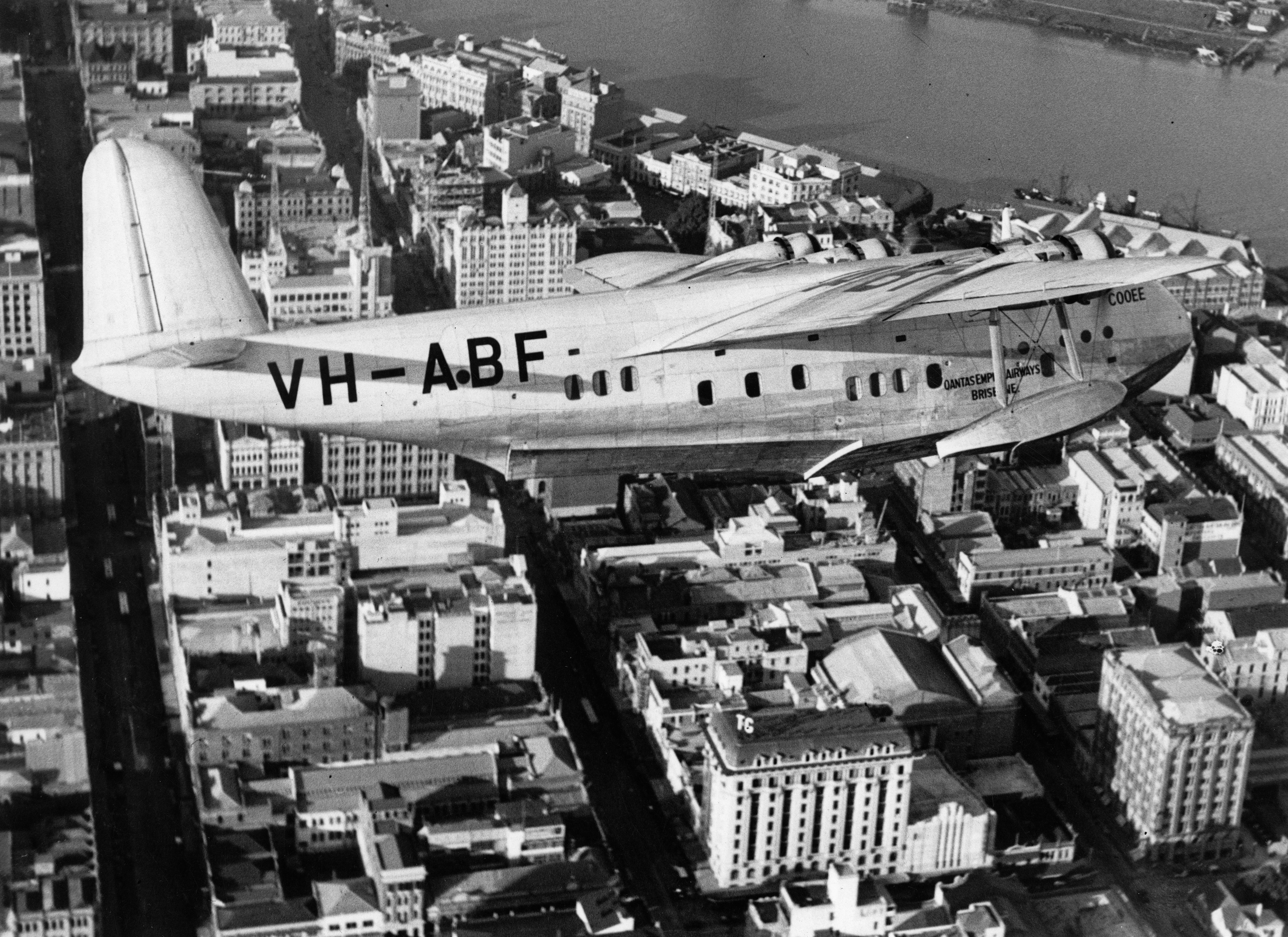
S23 flying boat circling over Brisbane

The Horseshoe route was a flying boat route between Sydney, Australia, and Durban, South Africa, via Singapore, Calcutta and Cairo during World War II. Mail could then be sent by sea between South Africa and Britain. Using Short Empire C Class S23 and S33 flying boats, British Overseas Airways Corporation (BOAC) operated the section between Durban and Singapore while Qantas Empire Airways operated the section between Singapore and Sydney. In October 1941, Qantas took over the Karachi - Singapore section as BOAC were short of pilots.

This emergency route was necessitated by Italy entering the war in June 1940, which made it impossible for mail to be flown between Britain and Egypt (and thus on to Australia or Africa) via the Mediterranean. The Horseshoe Route to Australia was suspended after the loss of Singapore in February 1942 after which it was restricted to being between Durban and Calcutta.

== Initial services ==
The first Durban - Sydney and Sydney - Durban flights both left on 19 June 1940 and arrived at their destination on 1 July. The first mail for the UK was sent from Cape Town on 5 July on the Winchester Castle and arrived in Britain on 21 July. The first mail dispatch from London was on 19 June and was sent on the Arundel Castle which left Southampton on 20 June and arrived in Cape Town on 7 July. It connected with the fourth Horseshoe flight from Durban, leaving there on 10 July and arriving in Sydney on 24 July.

Initially the Horseshoe service was weekly, but from 22 August 1940 its frequency was increased to twice a week.

== Disruption in mid 1941 ==
The route was disrupted in late April 1941 due to an uprising in Iraq which meant that the stop at Lake Habbaniyah was not available and there were no flights between Cairo and Basra in early May. A non-stop shuttle service was then set up between Tiberias and Basra, but the mail capacity was greatly reduced as more fuel had to be carried. The frequency of the service between Basra and Singapore was also reduced to once per week. The associated campaign in Syria meant that it was late July 1941 before the route was functioning normally again.

== End of through route to Sydney ==
The entry of Japan into World War II in December 1941 was not unexpected and reserve routes between Rangoon and Batavia had been prepared. Reserve Route 1 avoided Bangkok, but due to the rapid Japanese advance, it was only used once on 8 December and Reserve Route 2 which also avoided Penang was used. It was via Port Blair in the Andaman Islands. After 30 December, Reserve Route 3 was used in which Singapore was also avoided although shuttle flights continued between Batavia and Singapore.

In early February 1942, the Batavia - Darwin (Australia) section was changed from having an overnight stop at Surabaya to having overnight stops at Tjilatjap and Broome, but the last through service was shortly afterwards; the last flying boat left Singapore on 4 February 1942 and from 6 February the shuttle service ceased. On 3 March fifteen flying boats and seven aircraft, some of which had been used on the Horseshoe route, were ready to depart Broome, evacuating men, women and children, were all destroyed with considerable loss of life during the Japanese attack on Broome.

A much shortened, twice-weekly, route from Durban to Calcutta was initiated in April.

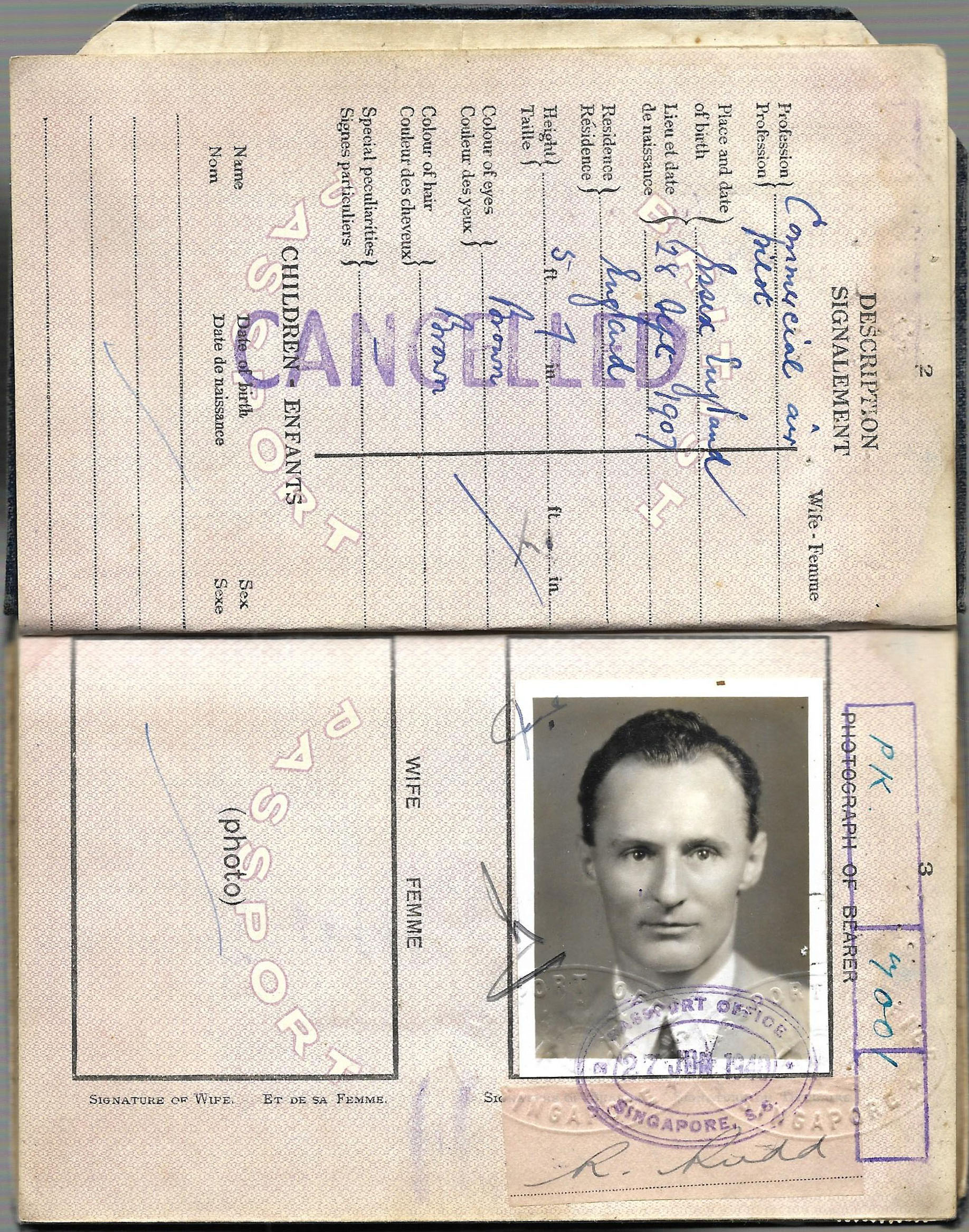
1940 British Straits Settlements colonial war-time passport issued to a BOAC pilot flying on the Horseshoe route.
