= Helen McGregor (geologist) =

Australian scientist

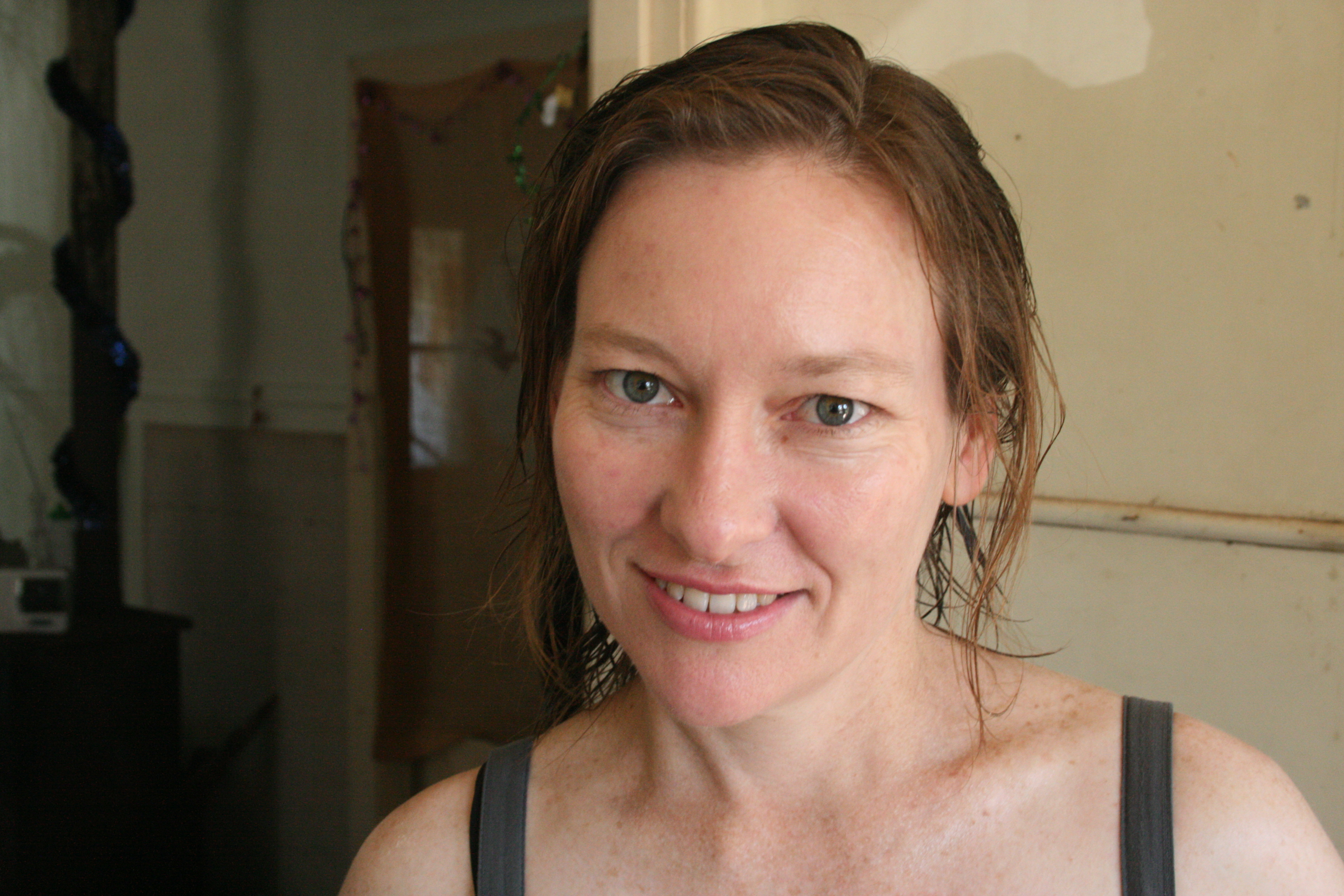
- Born: 1974 (age 51–52)
- Education: Australian National University
- Known for: Ocean and climate change research
- Scientific career
- Fields: Paeleoclimate, Geochemistry, Geology
- Workplaces: Australian National University

Helen McGregor is an Australian geologist and climate change researcher. She is currently a Fellow with the Research School of Earth Sciences at the Australian National University. Her areas of expertise include isotope geochemistry, palaeoclimatology, climate change processes, marine geology and Quaternary environments.

== Early life ==
McGregor was born in 1974. She is the oldest of four children.

== Education ==
McGregor completed secondary school in 1992 and from there was awarded a scholarship to study geology at James Cook University, and graduated with a 1st class BSc(Hons) in 1995. After working as a geologist in the mining industry she decided to return to university and complete a PhD. As she explained to The Sun Herald in 2012 "I could see my career path as a geologist in mining mapped out... Going into research and doing a PhD appealed as it was more of a challenge and I wasn't sure where it would take me" She completed her PhD through the Research School of Earth Sciences at the Australian National University in 2004.

== Research ==
McGregor's research focuses on paleoclimate, using fossilised coral to provide information on the El Nino Southern Oscillation (ENSO) system. Her research on ENSO and its impacts on climate have contributed to understanding how climate change will impact Australia and the world.

A major highlight of McGregor's work is on climatically‐driven coastal upwelling zones. Though representing less than one percent of the global ocean by area, coastal upwelling zones have extremely high biological productivity, and provide ~20% of the world's fisheries. Yet, despite their significance, there is intense debate as to whether these delicate regions are, or will be, influenced by global warming. McGregor's key finding was an unambiguous and rapid increase in upwelling intensity during the 20th century, unprecedented over the last 2500 years. Her discovery suggests that upwelling will continue to intensify with warming in the future, with major consequences for the ecosystems and fisheries dependent on coastal upwelling processes. This research attracted substantial media interest, both in Australia and overseas, and McGregor was invited to write a 'Science Highlight' on this study for PAGES News (2007).

McGregor has published over 50 research articles, including 26 papers in top-tier journals published in the last five years (Note: H-index = 12 Google Scholar) and two book chapters.

== Science communication ==
McGregor is concerned with science communication and has shared the results of her research with a number of media outlets including The ABC, The Sydney Morning Herald, The Sun Herald, The Yass Tribune and The Illawarra Mercury. Her work has also been featured in international publications such as the Alaska Report, The Dallas Morning News and Weser Kurier.

McGregor is especially interested in engendering understanding of climate change amongst the general public. In her opinion piece Climate Change is Real, Believe Me she says "Human-induced climate change is insidious. It is not an acute, headline-grabbing event but the consequences of climate change will have far greater and far reaching impacts. The science provides the clear evidence that human-induced climate change is occurring – the real uncertainty lies in our collective ability to do something about it."

== Awards and recognition ==
In 2014, McGregor was awarded a Future Fellowship grant through the Australian Research Council to continue her work on understanding El Nino and La Nina patterns and their influence on Australian climate, with a view to better managing things like Australia's water security.
