= Helen McGregor (writer) =

Helen McGregor is a writer, actor and lecturer. Her first novel, the murder mystery Schrödinger's Baby, was published in 1998. She teaches film history and theory at the National Film and Television School (NFTS) and the Met Film School, based at Ealing Studios in London. In 2010 and 2011 she performed a one-woman version of Richard III called Now is the Winter by Kate Saffin at the Edinburgh Fringe Festival.
