= Norrie Falla =

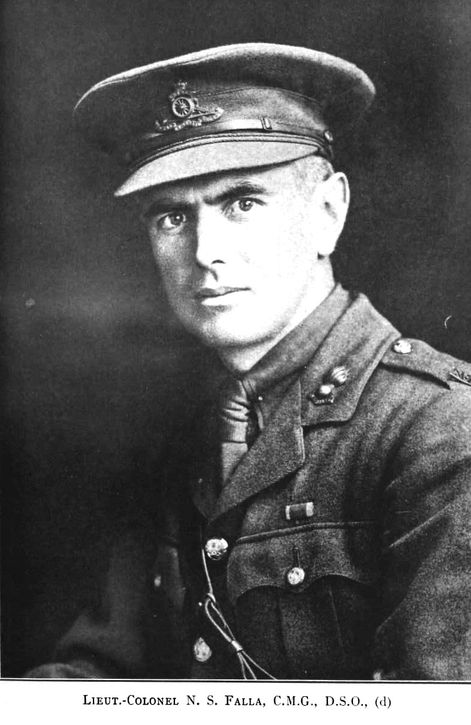
Norris Stephen Falla

Norris Stephen Falla CMG DSO (3 May 1883–6 November 1945) was a New Zealand shipping company manager, military leader, aviation promoter and managing director of Union Airways. He was born in Westport, New Zealand, on 3 May 1883.

In 1935, he was awarded the King George V Silver Jubilee Medal.
