= Breguet G.111 =

G.111/G.11E
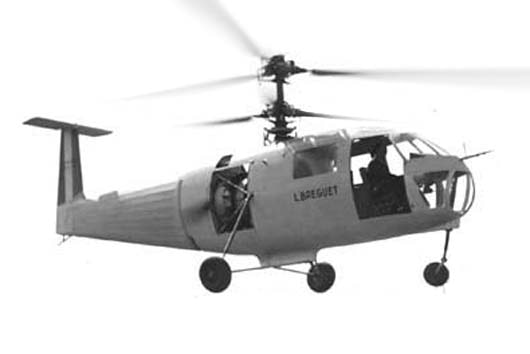
- Breguet G.111 in flight

General information
- Type: Experimental twin rotor helicopter
- National origin: France
- Manufacturer: Breguet Aviation
- Designer: Louis Charles Breguet
- Number built: 1

History
- First flight: 21 May 1949

The Breguet G.111 or alternatively, G.11E was a French passenger coaxial rotors helicopter flown soon after World War II. Only one was built, development ceasing when funding ran out.

== Design and development ==
Louis Breguet designed his first helicopter, the Breguet-Richet Gyroplane, in 1908 but his 1935 Gyroplane Laboratoire was much more successful. It had no tail rotor but instead had co-axial contra-rotating rotors. After World War II Breguet was approached by the Société Francaises du Gyroplane (SFG, English: French Gyroplane Society) for a helicopter capable of carrying several passengers. Breguet developed his wartime studies of a project named the G.34 into the two-passenger Breguet G.11E, otherwise known as the Société Francaises du Gyroplane G.11E.

Though a much larger aircraft, the G.11E used the same coaxial, three blade twin rotor layout as on the Gyroplane Laboratoire. It was initially powered by a fan cooled 179 kW (240 hp) Potez 9E nine cylinder radial engine mounted amidships, under the concentric rotor shafts. There was 6.5:1 speed reduction gearing between the engine and the rotor drive. The rotors are built around tapered tube spars, which carry ribs and are dural clad at the leading edges and with alloy over 3-ply elsewhere. They are mounted on flapping hinges and have drag hinge dampers. The control column alters cyclic pitch via a pair of swashplates and pedals make torque corrections and control yaw by changing the relative collective pitch of the two rotors. A mechanical inertial governor limited rotor accelerations; the pilot could increase the collective pitch over that set by the governor but not below it, emergencies apart.

The G.11E's fuselage has a tapered, oval section. The forward part is a light alloy monocoque containing the well glazed cockpit, accessed by two sliding doors. The rear fuselage is a steel tube structure, covered in fabric, bearing a tall T-tail with a moving, one-piece tailplane which corrected the cyclic pitch via the control column to prevent once per revolution pitch oscillations. A wide track undercarriage has main wheels mounted on horizontal V-struts from the fuselage bottom and with a single bracing strut to the mid-fuselage on each side.

The first flight was made on 21 May 1949 but tests showed that the G.11E was underpowered, so a decision was made to replace the Potez engine with a bigger nine-cylinder radial, a 336 kW (450 hp) Pratt & Whitney Wasp Junior. The type name was changed to G.111 and some re-design accompanied the power increase; the rotor diameter was increased by 1.00 m (3 ft 3 in) and the fuselage lengthened by 480 mm (1 ft 7 in) to include two more seats so that four passengers could be carried. Empty and maximum weights increased to 1,476 kg (3,254 lb) and 1,476 kg (3,254 lb) respectively.

The G.111 began flight tests in 1951 but these were not completed as SFG were declared bankrupt the following year.

== Variants ==
G.11E
Two passengers, Potez 9E engine.
G.111
Four passengers, G.11E re-engined with Wasp Junior, enlarged.

== Specifications (G.11E) ==
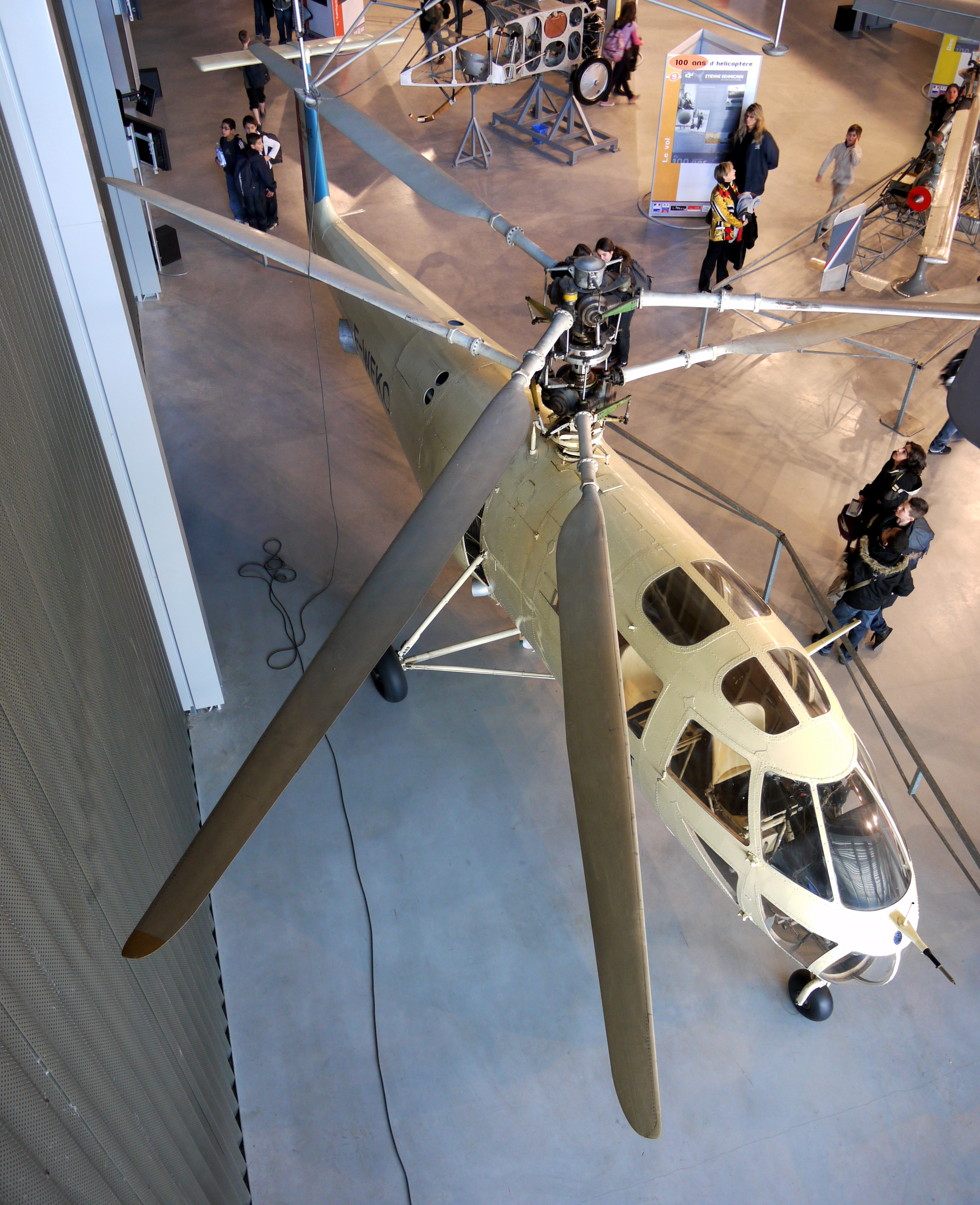

Data from Gaillard (1991) p.91.

General characteristics

- Crew: One pilot
- Capacity: Two passengers
- Length: 9.20 m (30 ft 2 in)
- Height: 4.05 m (13 ft 3 in)
- Empty weight: 850 kg (1,874 lb)
- Max takeoff weight: 1,300 kg (2,866 lb)
- Fuel capacity: 120 L (26.4 imp gal; 31.7 US gal)
- Powerplant: 1 × Potez 9E-00 fan cooled 9-cylinder radial, 180 kW (240 hp)
- Main rotor diameter: 2 × 8.60 m (28 ft 3 in)
- Main rotor area: 58.0 m^{2} (624 sq ft) each. 3 blade rotors.

Performance

- Maximum speed: 240 km/h (150 mph, 130 kn)
- Cruise speed: 185 km/h (115 mph, 100 kn)
- Service ceiling: 4,000 m (13,000 ft)

== See also ==
Related lists

- List of rotorcraft
