= Breguet Aviation =

French aircraft manufacturer

Société anonyme des ateliers d'aviation Louis Breguet
- Industry: Aerospace
- Founded: 1911
- Founder: Louis Charles Breguet
- Defunct: 1971
- Fate: Merged with Dassault
- Successor: Avions Marcel Dassault-Breguet Aviation
- Headquarters: France
- Key people: René Leduc
- Products: Aircraft, Helicopter

The Société anonyme des ateliers d'aviation Louis Breguet (English: /brɛˈɡeɪ/, French: [sɔsjete anɔnim de‿atəlje davjasjɔ̃ lwi bʁeɡɛ]), also known as Breguet Aviation ([bʁeɡɛ avjasjɔ̃]), was a French aircraft manufacturer.

The company was set up in 1911 by the aviation pioneer Louis Charles Breguet. Breguet Aviation was active during the First World War, producing numerous military aircraft, such as the pioneering metal Breguet 14 day-bomber, for the Allies. During the interwar period, the firm's aircraft set several records for non-stop crossings of the Atlantic Ocean, as well as with the unconventional Breguet-Dorand Gyroplane Laboratoire. It was active during the Second World War, surviving the conflict and largely focusing on commercial transport aircraft during the postwar years. Its most notable military programmes during the Cold War include the Breguet 1150 Atlantic and - with British Aircraft Corporation - the SEPECAT Jaguar. During 1971, Breguet Aviation merged with Dassault to form Avions Marcel Dassault-Breguet Aviation, which was subsequently rebranded as Dassault Aviation.

== History ==
The company was founded during 1911 by Louis-Charles Breguet, an early French airplane designer and builder, and his brother, Jacques. The company's name is sometimes spelled Bréguet by mistake.

That same year, Breguet's first airplane established a new speed record during a 10-kilometer (6.2-mile) flight. In 1912, Breguet constructed his first seaplane.

During the First World War, the company produced a range of military-orientated aircraft to assist the French war effort. In particular, it developed capable reconnaissance aircraft that saw use not only during the conflict but long into the 1920s as well. During this time, Breguet Aviation also played a pioneering role in the development of metal aircraft, such as the Breguet 14 day-bomber (almost entirely made of aluminum), which was one of the most famous French combat aircraft of its era. The Breguet-14's performance was such it was not only procured by the French military, but also exported to fill the ranks of sixteen squadrons of the American Expeditionary Force. Unable to meet wartime demands for its designs itself, production agreements were made with other firms to produce its aircraft as well. Between 1917 and 1919, just under 2,000 Breguet-designed aircraft were license-produced by the aviation interest of French industrial conglomerate Michelin.

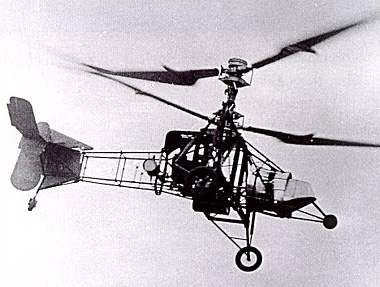
Breguet-Dorand Gyroplane Laboratoire in flight, circa 1933

During the interwar period, Breguet-built aircraft set several records; one plane performed the first non-stop crossing of the South Atlantic in 1927, while another made a 4,500-mile (7,242-kilometer) flight across the Atlantic Ocean during 1933, which was the longest non-stop Atlantic flight up to that time. During the 1930s, the firm developed the unconventional Breguet-Dorand Gyroplane Laboratoire, which flew by a combination of blade flapping and feathering. On 22 December 1935, this aircraft established a Federation Aeronautique Internationale speed record of 67 miles per hour (108 kilometres per hour), while the type also set an altitude record of 517 feet (158 meters) during the following year.

Breguet was engaged in the rearmament efforts during the late 1930s, producing numerous military aircraft in the run-up to and during the Second World War. After resuming normal operations in the immediate postwar climate, the company largely focused on the development of commercial transports and other large aircraft designs. On 4 May 1955, the company's founder, Louis-Charles Breguet, died in Paris, France.

In response to a NATO specification for a long-range maritime patrol aircraft to replace the Lockheed P2V Neptune, Breguet submitted its own design, the Br 1150, which was chosen as the winner in late 1958. Accordingly, a multinational consortium, Société d'Étude et de Construction de Breguet Atlantic (SECBAT) was set up to develop and build this aircraft, which was named the 1150 Atlantic. An initial order for 60 Atlantics – 40 for France and 20 for Germany – was placed in 1963; deliveries of the Atlantic commenced during 1965. The production line was reactivated following further orders from the Netherlands and Italy; this second production batch made its deliveries between 1972 and 1974. During 1978, the French Government authorised development of an updated version of the Atlantic, the Atlantic Nouvelle Génération or Atlantique 2, which involved little change to either airframe or engines while equipment and avionics were extensively revised. Deliveries started in 1989 with 28 eventually built, from an original requirement for 42.

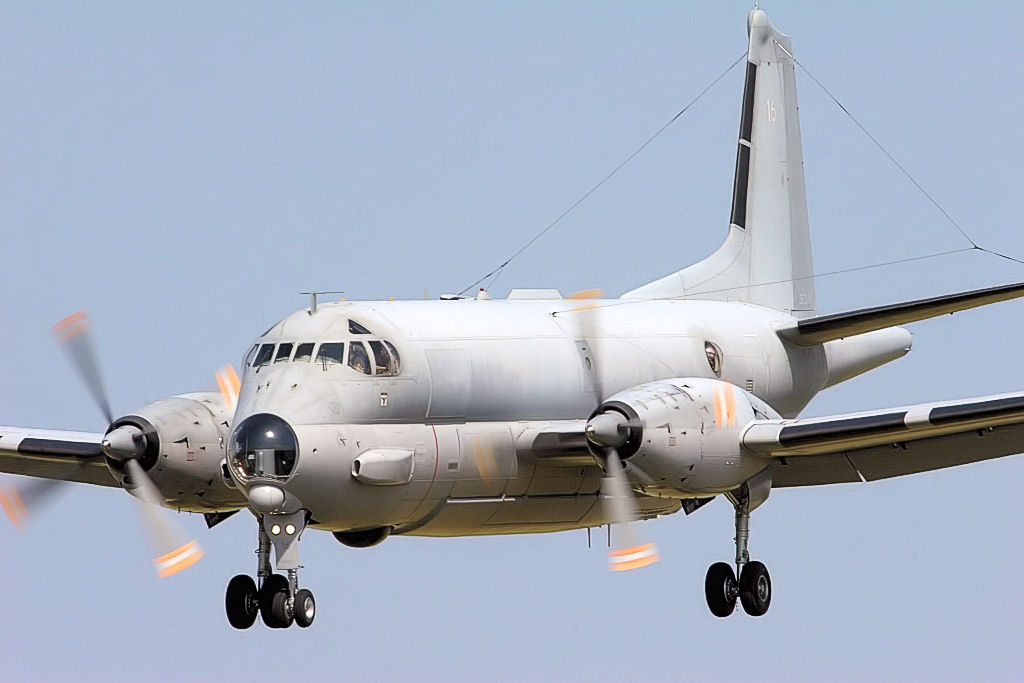
1150 Atlantic in flight, 2006

During the 1960s, Breguet Aviation became involved in the multinational joint venture company SEPECAT (Société Européenne de Production de l'Avion d'École de Combat et d'Appui Tactique – the "European company for the production of a combat trainer and tactical support aircraft") together with the British Aircraft Corporation (BAC) to produce the Jaguar strike aircraft. Though based in part on the Breguet Br.121, using the same basic configuration and an innovative French-designed landing gear, the Jaguar was built incorporating major elements of design from BAC – notably the wing and high lift devices. Production of components was split between Breguet and BAC, while the aircraft themselves would be assembled on two production lines; one in the UK and one in France. To avoid any duplication of work, each aircraft component had only one source.

Reportedly, collaboration between BAC and Breguet went relatively well. However, following Dassault's takeover of Breguet during 1971, the firm encouraged acceptance of its own designs, such as the Super Étendard naval attack aircraft and the Mirage F1 interceptor, for which the newly combined company would receive more workshare and profit, over the Jaguar.

== Aircraft ==
- Breguet-Richet Gyroplane (1907) - experimental single-seat helicopter-like craft with four rotors.
- Breguet-Richet Gyroplane No.2 (1908) Tandem biplane with a pair of large inclined propellers providing both thrust and lift.
- Breguet Type I (1909) - Single-seat tractor configuration biplane with boxkite-like tail on booms.
- Breguet Type II (1910) - Development of the Type I, with a tricycle undercarriage and the tail carried at the end of a fuselage-like structure and a pair of booms.
- Breguet Type III (1910) - Development of Type II, three-seat, rotary engine
- Breguet Type IV (1911) - Development of Type III: the first aircraft to be produced in quantity by Breguet.

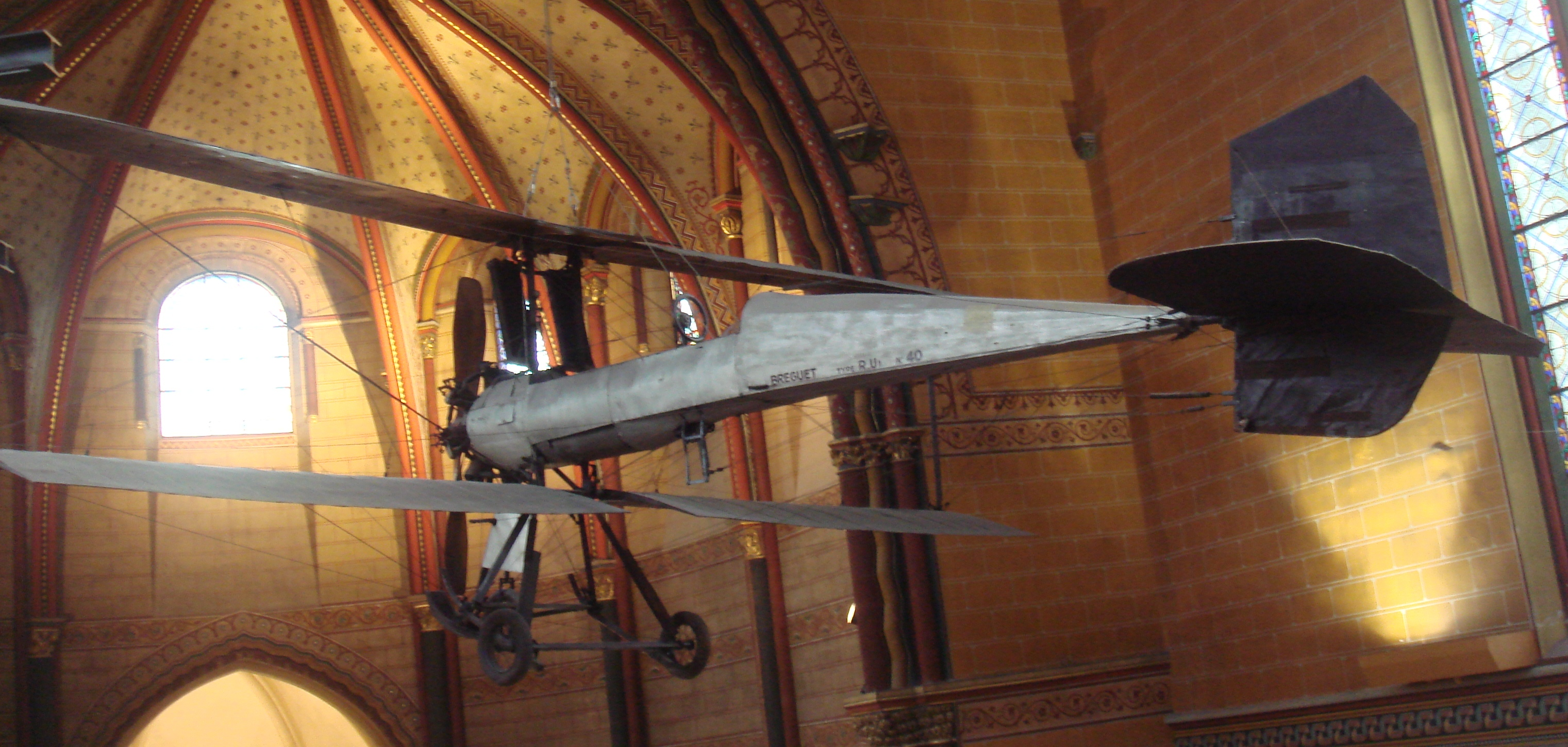
Breguet Type R.U1 No.40i at the Musée des Arts et Métiers, Paris.

- Breguet Type R.U1 (1911) - Single-engine biplane
- Breguet Aerhydroplane (1913) - Single-engine one-seat seaplane. Did not fly
- Breguet 4 (1914) - Single-engine two-seat biplane bomber. Pusher configuration
- Breguet 5 (1915) - Single-engine two-seat biplane escort fighter. Variant of Bre.4
- Breguet 6 (1915) - Version of Breguet 5 with different engine
- Breguet 12 (1918) - Version of Breguet 5 with 37mm cannon and searchlight (night fighter)
- Breguet 14 (1916) - Single-engine two-seat biplane bomber aircraft
- Breguet 16 (1918) - Larger version of Breguet 14. Bomber aircraft
- Breguet 17 (1918) - Smaller version of Breguet 14. Fighter aircraft.
- Breguet 19 (1922) - Single-engine two-seat biplane reconnaissance/light bomber/sport aircraft
- Breguet 20 Leviathan (1922) - Twin/four-engine 20-seat airliner
- Breguet 22 (1922-3) - Breguet 20 development
- Breguet 26T (1926) - Single-engine biplane eight-passenger airliner
- Breguet 280T (1928) - Development of 26T with improved fuselage aerodynamics
- License built Short S.8 Calcutta (1928) - Three-engine fifteen-seat biplane transport aircraft
- Breguet 27 (1929) - Single-engine two-seat biplane reconnaissance aircraft
- Breguet 270 (1929) - Development of 27 using steel chassis
- Breguet 393T (1931) - Three-engine biplane airliner
- Breguet 410 - Twin-engine light bomber
- Breguet-Dorand Gyroplane Laboratoire (1935) - Helicopter prototype
- Breguet G.111 (1949) - coaxial helicopter prototype
- Breguet 460 Vultur (1935) - Twin-engine light bomber
- Breguet 470 Fulgur (1936) - Twin-engine airliner, only one example built.
- Breguet 480 - Long-range bomber project
- Breguet 482 (1947) - Four-engine bomber, designed prior to war, only a single example built
- Breguet 500 Colmar - Transport development of the Br.480
- Breguet 521 Bizerte (1933) - Development of the S.8 Calcutta. Long-range patrol flying boat
- Breguet 530 Saigon - Civilian version of 521
- Breguet 693 (1938) - Twin-engine two-seat monoplane ground attack/fighter aircraft
- Breguet 730 (1938) - Four-engine long-range flying boat. . Also Br.731
- Breguet 763 Deux-Ponts (1949) - Br.761/763/765 Four-engine double-deck large airliner. Piston engines.
- Breguet 790 Nautilus - Single-engine flying boat
- Breguet 850 - 28-engine airliner, never built.
- Breguet 851 - Revision of the Breguet 850 project.
- Le transport de 500 tonnes - 60-engine airliner, planned as an enlarged variant of the Breguet 850, never built.
- Le transport de 1000 tonnes - 120-engine behemoth airliner, based on Breguet 850, never built.
- Breguet 890 Mercure - Civil/military transport
- Breguet Br 900 Louisette - (1948) Single-seat competition sailplane.
- Breguet Br 901 Mouette - (1954) Single-seat competition sailplane.
- Breguet Br 904 Nymphale - (1956) Two-seat sailplane.
- Breguet Br 905 Fauvette - (1958) Single-seat competition sailplane.
- Breguet 940 - Four-engine STOL transport aircraft. Turboprop engines
- Breguet 941 (1961) - Four-engine STOL transport aircraft. Turboprop engines
- Breguet 960 Vultur (1951) - Br.960 Twin-engine two-seat naval anti-submarine aircraft. Jet engine and turboprop engine (mixed power)
- Breguet 1001 Taon (1957) - Br.1001 Single-engine single-seat jet strike aircraft.
- Breguet 1050 Alizé (1956) - Br.1050 Single-engine three-seat naval anti-submarine aircraft. Turboprop engine

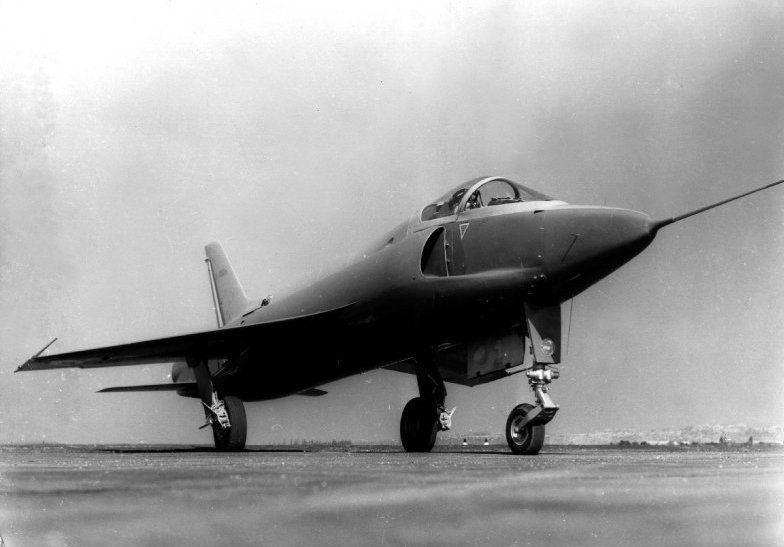
Breguet 1100

- Breguet 1100 (1957) - Br.1100 Twin-engine jet fighter
- Breguet 1150 Atlantic (1961) - Br.1150 Twin-engine naval reconnaissance aircraft. Turboprop engines

=== Leduc aircraft ===
- Leduc 0.10
- Leduc 0.21
- Leduc 0.22

== Automobile production ==
Before 1914, in addition to producing aircraft, the firm produced a few six cylinder-engined cars.

During the Second World War, the company produced an electric car powered by batteries and propelled by an "off-the-shelf" motor from Paris-Rhône. The motor was capable of producing two different levels of output. "First gear" and "Reverse gear" were provided with 36 volts while "Second gear" equated to 72 volts. An advertisement for the car in 1941 claimed a range of 100 km (62 mi) between charges without mentioning that this range was only available when adhering to a steady cruising speed of 20 km/h (12 mph). Cruising at a steady 40 km/h (25 mph) would, on the same basis, have given a range of 65 km (40 mi).

The car had a modern looking all-enveloping two-seater body with a relatively long tapered tail which contained the motor and some of the batteries. It had four wheels but the rear axle which delivered power to the road was relatively narrow. The car was actively marketed during 1941 which was a period of price instability. In August 1941 the Breguet electric car was priced at 56,000 francs: during the same month the Citroën Light bodied 11 (still listed despite production by now being down to a trickle or suspended) was priced at 35,630 francs.

The Breguet electric car was produced not at the firm's principal plant at Toulouse but at a smaller plant at Anglet (between Biarritz and Bayonne).

== See also ==
- List of aircraft (Br-Bz)
