= Breguet Aerhydroplane =

Aerhydroplane
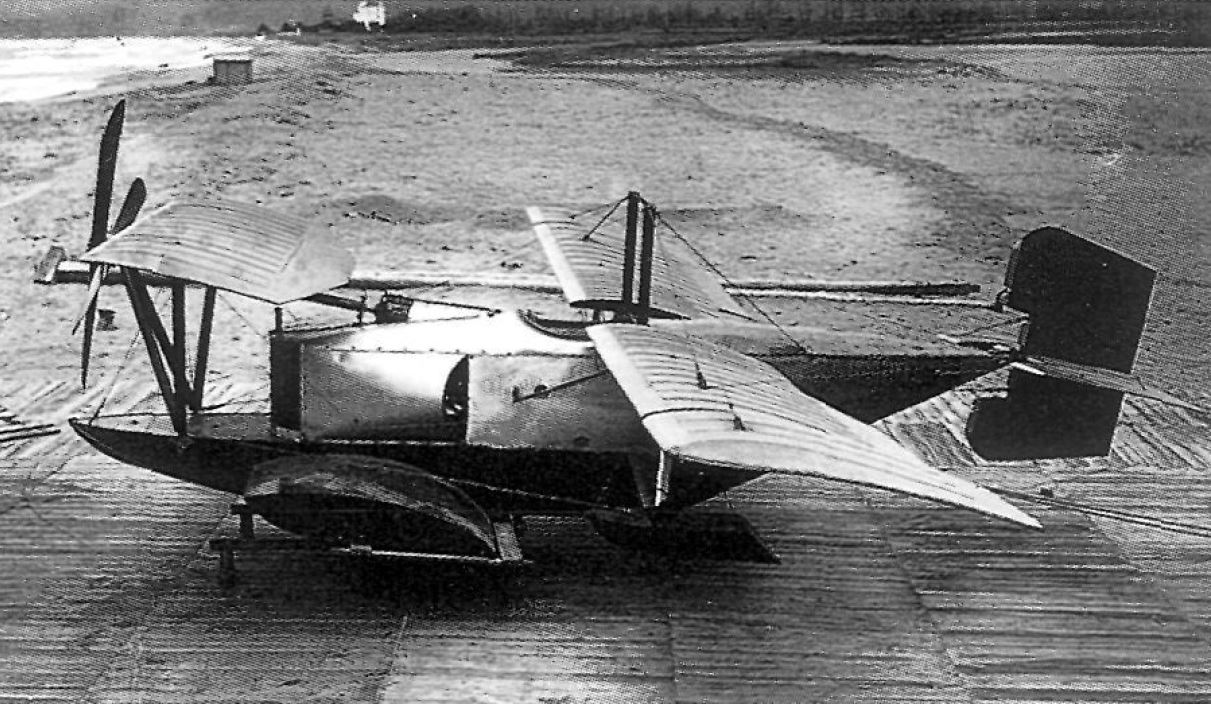
- Low-quality contemporary left-hand-side view. The aircraft's four-bladed propeller is to the left, its tailfin to the right.

General information
- Type: Experimental flying boat
- Manufacturer: Breguet Aviation
- Designer: Louis Charles Breguet and Alphonse Tellier
- Number built: 1

The Breguet Aerhydroplane was a large experimental flying boat developed in France in 1912. It proved to be underpowered and never flew.

Huge for its day, it was a parasol-wing monoplane of canard configuration (described in some sources as a tandem wing design on account of the wide span of the foreplane relative to the mainplane) with a single tractor propeller turned by a chain drive from an engine located within the hull. The hull was designed for Bréguet by Alphonse Tellier and featured wide sponsons. The empennage was the cruciform tail common to early Bréguet designs. Christened La Marseillaise, it was displayed at the Salon de l'Aéronautique in 1912 and demonstrated at Monaco by Bréguet in 1913 along with his more conventional H-U2 and H-U3 seaplanes. Here, it proved itself capable of maneuvering on water, but not of actually taking off, its 97 kW (130 hp) engine being incapable of making its 2,000 kg (4,410 lb) weight airborne. All development was abandoned at this point.

== Specifications ==
General characteristics

- Empty weight: 1,400 kg (3,090 lb)
- Gross weight: 2,000 kg (4,400 lb)
- Powerplant: 1 × Salmson , 97 kW (130 hp)

Performance
