= Breguet Type II =

Type II
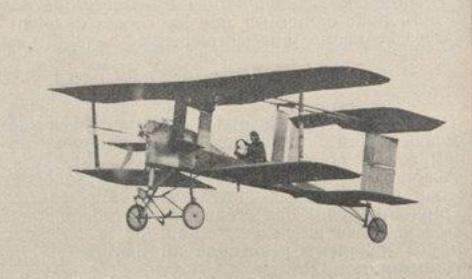

General information
- Type: Experimental aircraft
- National origin: France
- Manufacturer: Louis Breguet
- Designer: Louis Breguet
- Number built: 1

History
- First flight: 5 January 1910
- Developed from: Breguet Type I

The Breguet Type II was the second fixed-wing aircraft design produced by Louis Breguet. Built during late 1909, it was soon discarded in favour of his next design, the Breguet Type III

== Design ==
Like Breguet's previous design, the Breguet Type I, the structure was principally of metal, although less highly stressed parts such as the tail surfaces used wood. It had a triangular section fuselage of wire-braced steel tube with the 41 kW (55 hp) air-cooled Renault engine at the front: this drove a three-bladed propeller which was connected to the engine's camshaft and so revolved at half the speed of the engine. The wings had pressed aluminium ribs threaded onto a mainspar of 65 mm (2.56 in) diameter steel tube. These were connected by a single interplane strut on either side. Tail surfaces consisted of a pair of horizontal surfaces, the lower carried on the rear of the fuselage and the upper by a pair of booms running back from the centre section of the upper wing. The upper surface was movable to achieve pitch control. A rectangular balanced rudder was mounted between the two horizontal surfaces. In addition a pair of small horizontal stabilising surfaces were mounted at the front of the aircraft either side of the engine. The pilot's seat was positioned halfway between the wings and the tail surfaces: a passenger seat was fitted behind the engine. The main undercarriage employed oleo-pneumatic suspension, and there was a single steerable tailwheel.

It was intended that lateral stability would be achieved by automatic differential movement of the two halves of the upper wing, this feature being the subject of a patent filed by Breguet. In a turn, the greater speed of the outer wing would cause the angle of attack to be reduced, so eliminating the increase in lift that the greater speed would otherwise have produced. Lateral control was effected by a pair of mid-gap ailerons mounted on the interplane struts: these were evidently not effective and Breguet intended to use another method for lateral control in his next design.

== Operational history ==
Its first recorded flight was made on 5 January 1910, when Louis Breguet made three circuits of the flying field at La Brayelle near Douai. and on 16 January 1910 it made a flight of 1.5 km (0.93 mi) However, by April 1910 Breguet was flying his next design, the Type III.

== Specifications ==
Data from l'Aérophile, 1 January 1910, pp. 58–60

General characteristics

- Crew: 1
- Capacity: 1
- Upper wingspan: 12.0 m (39 ft 4 in)
- Wing area: 40 m^{2} (430 sq ft)
- Empty weight: 580 kg (1,279 lb)
- Gross weight: 800 kg (1,764 lb)
- Powerplant: 1 × Renault 50/60 hp V-8 air-cooled piston engine, 41 kW (55 hp)
- Propellers: 3-bladed, 2.50 m (8 ft 2 in) diameter

Performance

- Maximum speed: 70 km/h (43 mph, 38 kn)
