= La Brayelle Airfield =

Defunct historical airfield in France

- IATA: none; ICAO: none

Summary
- Serves: Douai, France
- Location: 3 km (1.9 mi) west of Douai
- Elevation AMSL: 98 ft / 30 m
- Coordinates: 50°21′56″N 03°02′07″E

Map
- Location in France La Brayelle (Nord-Pas-de-Calais)

La Brayelle Airfield was one of the first airfields in France. It was situated 3 kilometres (1.9 miles) west of Douai, in the Nord département in northern France. It was host to the world's first aviation meeting, home to Bréguet Aviation, and an important airfield in the First World War (WW1). It is occasionally referred to as Douai-Brayelles airfield. There were several other airfields in the area of Douai, especially during WW1, so the term 'Douai Airfield' may or may not refer to La Brayelle.

== Early years ==
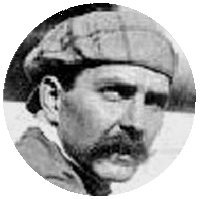
Louis Breguet in June 1909

In 1900 brothers Jacques and Louis Breguet were running a factory producing electric motors and dynamos at La Brayelle. A friend, psychologist Professor Charles Richet, persuaded them to look into the then novel aviation industry. In 1902 Louis built a wind tunnel in the factory and his research started.

The first product was the Bréguet-Richet Gyroplane No.1, a machine with four sets of four biplane rotors driven by a 50 horsepower (37 kW) engine. On 29 September 1907 it rose vertically to a height of two feet (0.6m), steadied by four assistants – the first ever manned helicopter flight, but it was completely uncontrollable. In 1908 the Bréguet-Richet Aircraft Manufacturing Company was formed, continuing development of the Gyroplane with a second more successful model. This was badly damaged in a hard landing, and was used as the basis for the model 2bis, which was nearly ready for flight when it was destroyed in its hangar by a severe storm in early 1909.

On 17 December 1907, local businessman Pierre Arbel, director of the Forges de Douai, donated land as France's first airfield, and created a 72 hectares (180 acres) field and a fenced area for the hangars and workshops.

Breguet's first fixed-wing aircraft, the Type 1, had its first flight at the airfield on 28 June 1909.

== Concours d’Aviation ==
Also in 1909, the world's first aeronautical meeting was held here. The Concours d’Aviation was sponsored by the town of Douai and its main driving force was Louis Breguet. It was held from 28 June to 18 July. Several aviators took part, including Louis Breguet himself, Louis Blériot, Hubert Latham and Louis Paulhan, and several records were broken.

On 9 July around 20,000 people attended the event, including members of the French Senate and the Russian Duma. On the last day, one of the world's first air races took place, between Blériot and Paulhan. Blériot won the speed prize and Paulhan won a distance contest and separately set a new world altitude record of 150 metres (490 ft), comfortably clearing a reference balloon set at the 120 metres (390 ft) target to beat the 110 metres (360 ft) record set by Wilbur Wright the previous year.

The event was followed shortly afterwards by the much larger Grande Semaine d'Aviation de la Champagne at Reims.

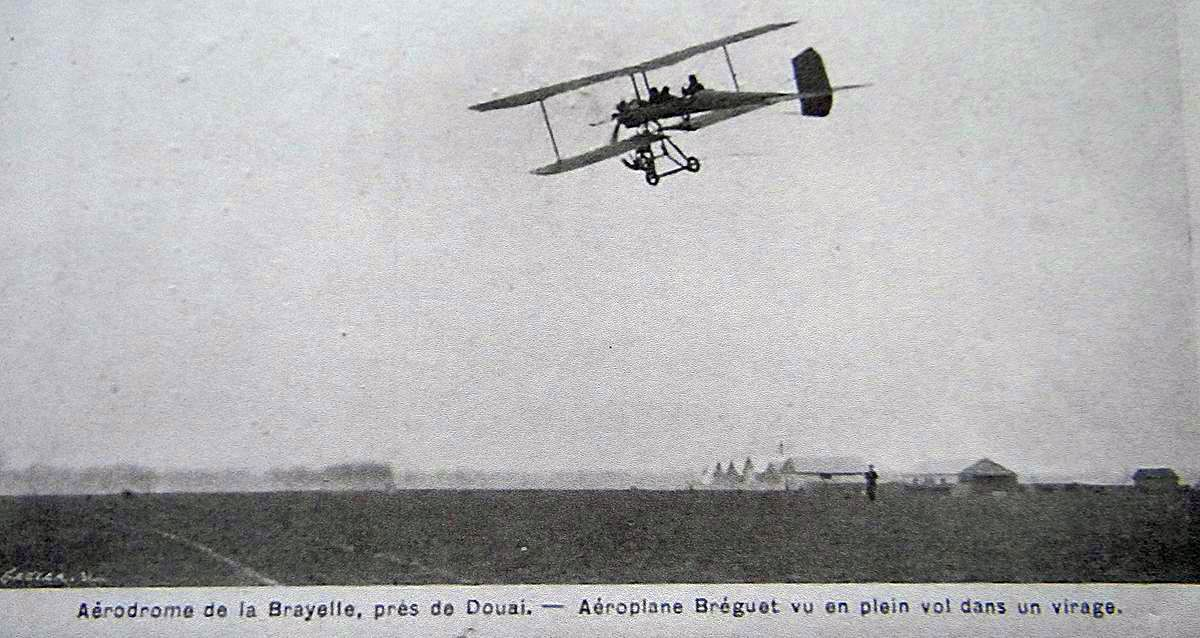
A Bréguet Type IV above La Brayelle in 1910

In 1911 Louis Bréguet started his own company, Bréguet Aviation, and by 1913, he had established a flying school, both based here. Jacques Breguet founded the Aero Club of Douai at La Brayelle around this time, which also engaged in training pilots. (Note: Jacques Breguet went on to be vice president of the French Aeronautical Federation and a director of Air France. He died on 21 May 1939.)

Unfortunately, the world's first fatal mid-air collision occurred here on 19 June 1912. Captain Marcel Dubois and Lieutenant Albert Peignan, both of the French Army, crashed into one another in an early-morning haze, killing both pilots.

== WWI ==
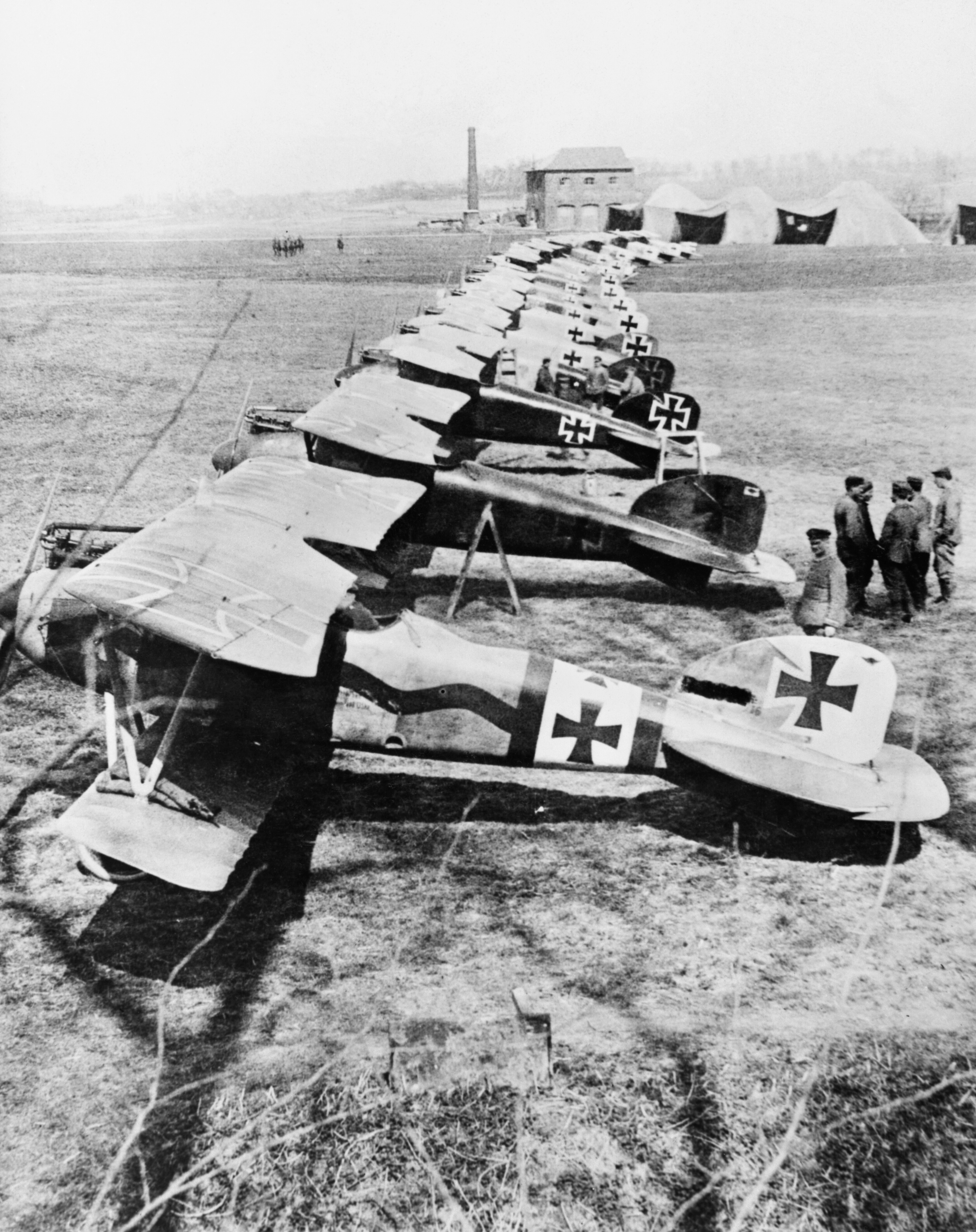
Albatros D.III aircraft of Jasta 11 and Jasta 4 at La Breyelle in March 1917. Von Richtofen's aircraft is 2nd in line.

In 1914, at the start of the war, the French military arrived, and the Royal Naval Air Service stationed some armoured cars here. Anticipating the approach of German troops, the Bréguet factory was evacuated. When the Germans arrived, they took over the airfield and built more hangars.

During the war, the airfield was subject to regular bombing. In June 1916 Bavarian aerial reconnaissance unit Feldflieger Abteilung (Field Aviation Battalion) 5b arrived at La Brayelle, but left in October after hangars were destroyed during heavy bombardment.

Jasta 11 was mobilised at the airfield on 11 October 1916, equipped with Albatros D.III fighters. Two days after he had been awarded the Pour le Mérite, Manfred von Richthofen arrived as commander on 15 January 1917 and scored their first victory on 23 January, shooting down and killing John Hay of No. 40 Squadron Royal Flying Corps (RFC) in an F.E.8. Von Richthofen scored 26 victories while based here. Jasta 11 became the most successful fighter squadron in the German AF. The airfield was bombed by RFC night bombers on the nights of the 5/6 and 7/8 April 1917, and Jasta 11 moved to Roucourt, 26 miles to the north-east on the 13 April 1917.

Jasta 4 was at La Brayelle between 24 February to 31 May 1917, and Jasta 12 arrived here 18 August 1917.

The Germans continued to occupy the airfield, and on 2 May 1918 Roderic Dallas, commander of RAF 40 Squadron, in an S.E.5, created an unusual incident when he dropped a package with a note taunting the Germans, then bombed and shot up the base, apparently to the amusement of Field Marshal Haig and Sir Hugh Trenchard.

The Germans left on 17 October 1918, and on 21 October RAF No. 16 Squadron arrived for a few days stay with their R.E.8s. On 27 October No. 25 Squadron RAF moved into the airfield with DH.4s and DH.9As, and was still operating here at the date of the Armistice of 11 November 1918. Other RAF squadrons resident for a few weeks during this period were numbers 18 (DH.9A), and 32 (SE5a).

== Post WWI ==
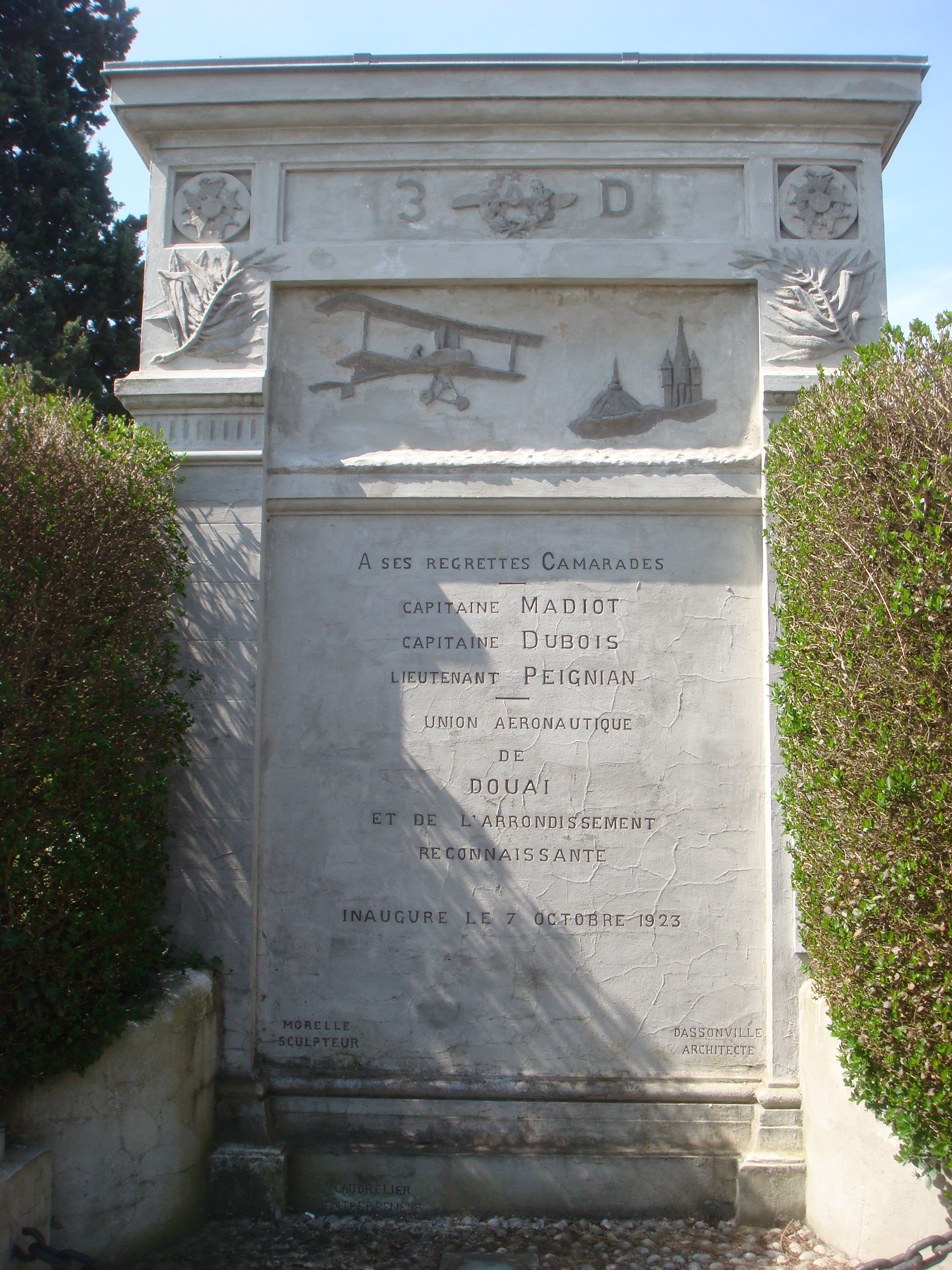
Roadside memorial at La Brayelle to Capitaine Madiot and his crew.

The airfield continued in use after the First World War, but, being quite small, could not accommodate larger aircraft. However, successful airshows were held in 1929 and 1935. During the Second World War the Germans again occupied the airfield, but it was unsuitable for operations, so they moved instead to Vitry-en-Artois airfield, three miles to the southwest, which they considered more convenient and which had runways which could be concreted.

After the war, the airfield continued in use until the 1950s, when it was finally closed. Almost all traces of the old airfield have disappeared, and the site is now occupied largely by agricultural land and industrial areas including a large Renault car plant.

There remains a memorial to Capitaine Louis Gabriel Madiot, Capitaine Dubois and Lieutenant Peignian, who all died in the crash of a Bréguet aircraft on 23 October 1910. It was erected on 7 October 1923, and is located by the roadside in the area of the original Breguet workshops.
