= Breguet Type III =

- Breguet III with wings folded for transport.

General information
- Type: Experimental aircraft
- Manufacturer: Breguet
- Designer: Louis Breguet

History
- First flight: 1910

The Breguet Type III was an early biplane built by Louis Breguet in France in 1910.

== Design and development ==
The Breguet Type III, which first flew in April 1910, was a development of the Type II which Breguet had built and flown earlier that year. Eliminating the upper booms that had helped to carry the tail surfaces of the earlier aircraft, it had what is now seen as the conventional biplane configuration, with a fuselage containing a front-mounted engine driving a tractor propeller and control and stabilising surfaces mounted at the rear. At the time this was an unusual layout: the Goupy II which had first flown the previous year was the first aircraft of this configuration to be successful. Like Breguet's earlier aircraft, extensive use of metal was made in its construction: the structure of the rectangular-section fuselage, wing spars and interplane struts were steel, and the ribs were aluminium pressings.

The lower wings were mounted on a short spar mounted below the lower longerons and the upper wing was supported by only four struts, two inboard supporting the centre section of the wing, and one on either side connecting the mainspars of the wings near the wingtips. The mainspars of the wing panels were connected to the centre-section spar by knuckle joints, so that the wings could easily be folded back for road or rail transport.

Four small vertical stabilisers were mounted below the upper wing, and a pair of supplementary control surfaces were mounted below the fuselage. These were intended for lateral control, and were operated in conjunction with wing-warping The rear-mounted empennage initially consisted of a fixed fin and rudder and a rectangular elevator, with no fixed horizontal surface, but this was soon replaced by a cruciform assembly combining rudder and elevator, connected to the fuselage by a universal joint. This unusual arrangement became a characteristic of the aircraft manufactured by Breguet before World War I.

The prototype was powered by a 50 hp (37 kW) Gnome Omega driving a three-bladed aluminium propeller through a 2:1 reduction gear. Later aircraft were produced with other powerplants.

== Operational history ==
A Type III gained fame in August 1910 by being the first aircraft to lift six people.

== Operators ==
France

- French Air Force

== Specifications (example shown at 1910 Paris Aero Salon) ==
Data from

General characteristics

- Length: 9.2 m (30 ft 2 in)
- Upper wingspan: 13.2 m (43 ft 4 in)
- Lower wingspan: 9.9 m (32 ft 6 in)
- Wing area: 38 m^{2} (410 sq ft)
- Empty weight: 475 kg (1,047 lb)
- Powerplant: 1 × R.E.P. 1910 60hp 5-cyl. 2-row semi-radial, 45 kW (60 hp)

== See also ==
- Breguet 4
- Breguet 5
