= Bréguet 4 =

French WW1 bomber aircraft

Bre.4
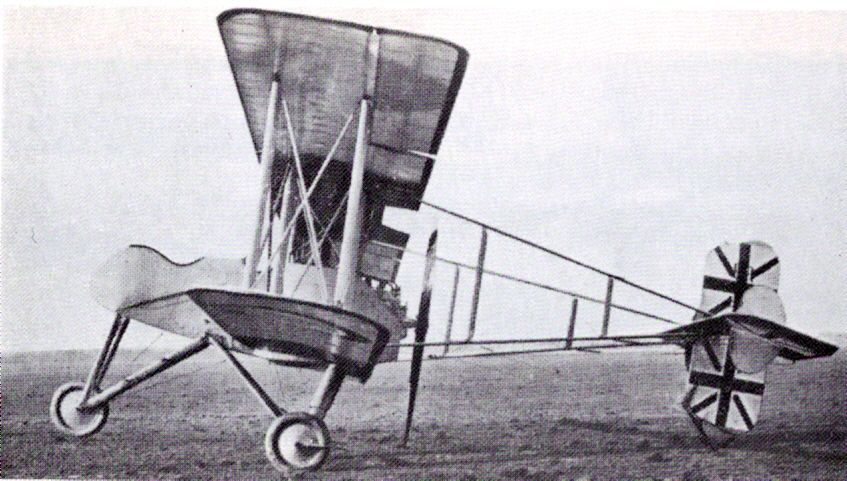
- Bréguet BUC/BLC de Chasse operating with No. 5 Wing, Royal Naval Air Service, in Belgium sometime between April and June 1916

General information
- Type: Bomber
- Manufacturer: Bréguet, Michelin
- Designer: Louis Charles Bréguet
- Primary users: French Army Royal Naval Air Service
- Number built: ca. 100

History
- Introduction date: 1914
- First flight: 1914

The Bréguet Bre.4, also known variously as the Type IV and BUM, was a French biplane bomber of World War I. A fighter version of it was also produced as the BUC and BLC; some of these saw service with the British Royal Navy, which called them 'the Bréguet de Chasse.

== Design and development ==
The Bre.4 was developed during 1914 when French military planners began to express a preference for pusher- over tractor-configured aircraft, leading Bréguet Aviation to cease further development of its original Type IV design and pursue military contracts with an aircraft of the preferred layout. The Type IV was a two-bay, equal-span, unstaggered biplane that seated the pilot and observer in tandem open cockpits in a nacelle that also carried the pusher engine at its rear, and the tricycle undercarriage.

As the prototype neared completion, the Bréguet factory at La Brayelle, Douai was threatened by the advancing German Army, and the machine and its builders were evacuated to Villacoublay where construction and testing were completed. At this point, André and Édouard Michelin approached the French government with an offer to sponsor the construction of 100 bombers for the French Army, and were awarded a licence for the Bréguet design. This was put into production as the BUM (B for pusher-driven, U for Canton-Unné-powered, M for Michelin). A later revised version, the BLM, was the definitive Renault-powered version.

Soon after the BUM entered service, the French Army requested that an escort fighter version be developed to protect the bombers from interception. Bréguet responded with a lightened design armed with a 37 mm (1.46 in) Hotchkiss cannon, intended to pick off enemy fighters before they closed to within range of their machine guns. This design yielded an aircraft that had defensive capabilities, without the engineering difficulties of producing a nose mounted gun that would have to shoot between the propeller blades of the aircraft it was mounted on. There still, however, remained a risk for the discarded bullet casings to fly into the propeller, causing damage. This entered production as the BUC (C for chasse, or pursuit) in its original Canton-Unné powered version and BLC in its Renault version.

== Operational history ==
=== French service ===
Few of the BUC and BLC escort fighters were built, as their performance and utility were discovered to be lacking, and the doctrine of the cannon-armed escort fighter was soon abandoned in favour of countering fighters with other similar dedicated fighters.

=== Royal Naval Air Service ===
Bréguet built 17 BUC/BLCs for the British Royal Navy's Royal Naval Air Service using British 225 hp (168 kW) Sunbeam Mohawk engines. The Royal Navy called them the Bréguet de Chasse. They served alongside Caudron G.4s with No. 5 Wing RNAS – the Royal Navy's first air unit specifically trained for long-range bombing – in Belgium from April to June 1916.

== Variants ==
Type IV (BU.3)

Bréguet prototype.

BUM (BrM 2B.2)

Michelin-built, Canton-Unné-powered bomber version.

BLM (BrM 4B.2)

Michelin-built, Renault-powered bomber version.

BUC

Michelin-built, Canton-Unné-powered escort fighter version.

BLC

Michelin-built, Renault-powered escort fighter version.

Bréguet de Chasse

Version of BLC for RNAS, powered by Sunbeam Mohawk or Rolls-Royce Falcon engine.

== Operators ==
France

- French Air Force

Romania

- Romanian Air Corps

United Kingdom

- Royal Naval Air Service
  - No. 5 Wing RNAS

== Specifications (BUC) ==
Data from

General characteristics

- Crew: two, pilot and gunner
- Length: 9.50 m (31 ft 2 in)
- Wingspan: 16.40 m (53 ft 10 in)
- Height: 3.70 m (12 ft 2 in)
- Wing area: 54.0 m^{2} (581 sq ft)
- Empty weight: 1,160 kg (2,557 lb)
- Gross weight: 1,535 kg (3,384 lb)
- Powerplant: 1 × Salmson 2M7 water cooled radial engine , 149 kW (200 hp)

Performance

- Maximum speed: 138 km/h (86 mph, 75 kn)
- Range: 399 km (248 mi, 216 nmi)
- Endurance: 3 hours

Armament

- 1 × trainable 37 mm (1.46 in) Hotchkiss cannon in front cockpit
- 300 kg (660 lb) of bombs
