= Breguet Type IV =

Type IV
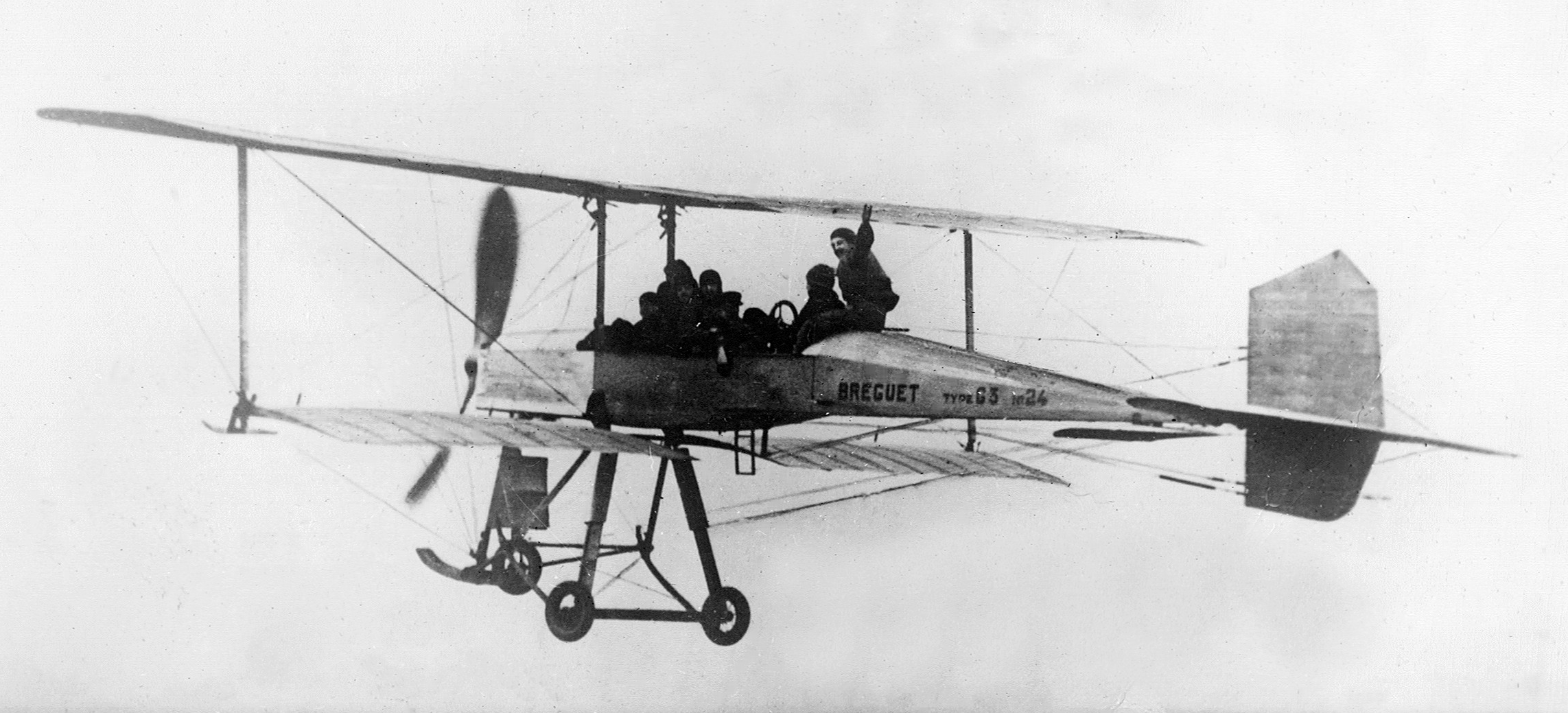
- Breguet and around 10 passengers above the airport of Douai in March 1911

General information
- Manufacturer: Breguet
- Designer: Louis Breguet

History
- First flight: 1911

The Breguet Type IV refers to a series of tractor-configuration biplanes built by Breguet Aviation between 1911 and 1913. These were the first Breguet aircraft to be produced in quantity and were used by the French Army and the British Royal Flying Corps. This type is notable for its extensive use of metal, which was unusual for an aircraft of its era.

== Design and development ==
The Breguet Type IV was developed from the Breguet Type III which had appeared during 1910. It was a tractor biplane with a tricycle undercarriage.

== Variants and nomenclature ==
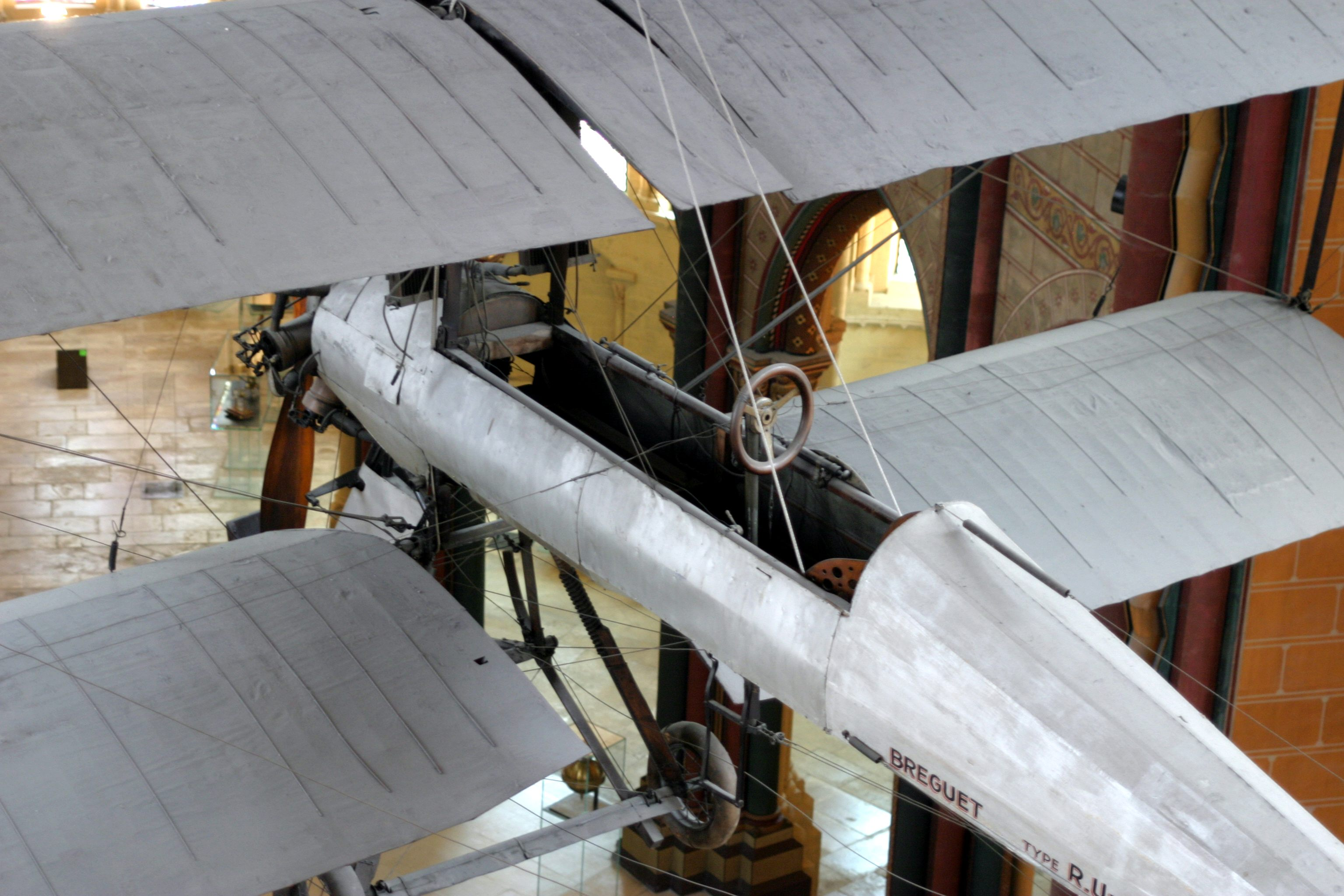
View of R.U.1, clearly showing construction of the aircraft

The Breguet Type IV was produced in a number of variants, differing in their seating arrangement and in the engine fitted. Although Breguet's earlier aircraft were referred to using a type number, the aircraft produced after the Type III were generally referred to using an airframe number and a letter/number combination denoting the type of engine fitted.

Pre 1914 designations:

- C.1 powered by a 40 hp (30 kW) Chenu
- C.2 powered by an 80 hp (60 kW) Chenu
- D.2 powered by a 100 hp (75 kW) Dansette
- G, later G.1 powered by a 50 hp (37 kW) Gnome Omega
- G.2 powered by a 70 hp (52 kW) Gnome Gamma
- G.2bis powered by an 80 hp (60 kW) Gnome Lambda or a 100 hp (75 kW) Gnome Delta
- G.3 powered by a 100 hp (75 kW) Gnome Double Omega
- G.4 powered by a 140 hp (100 kW) Gnome Double Gamma or a 160 hp (120 kW) Gnome Double Lambda
- L.1 powered by a Renault 50/60 hp (the 'L' for Louis Renault)
- L.2 powered by a 70 hp (52kW) Renault
- L.2bis powered by a 90 hp (67kW) Renault
- L.3 powered by a 100 hp (75kW) Renault
- O.1 powered by an 80 hp (60 kW) Le Rhône 9C
- R.1 powered by a 50 hp (37 kW) REP
- R.2 powered by a 70 hp (52 kW) REP
- U.1 powered by a 7-cylinder Canton-Unné
- U.2 powered by an 9-cylinder Canton-Unné

== Surviving aircraft ==
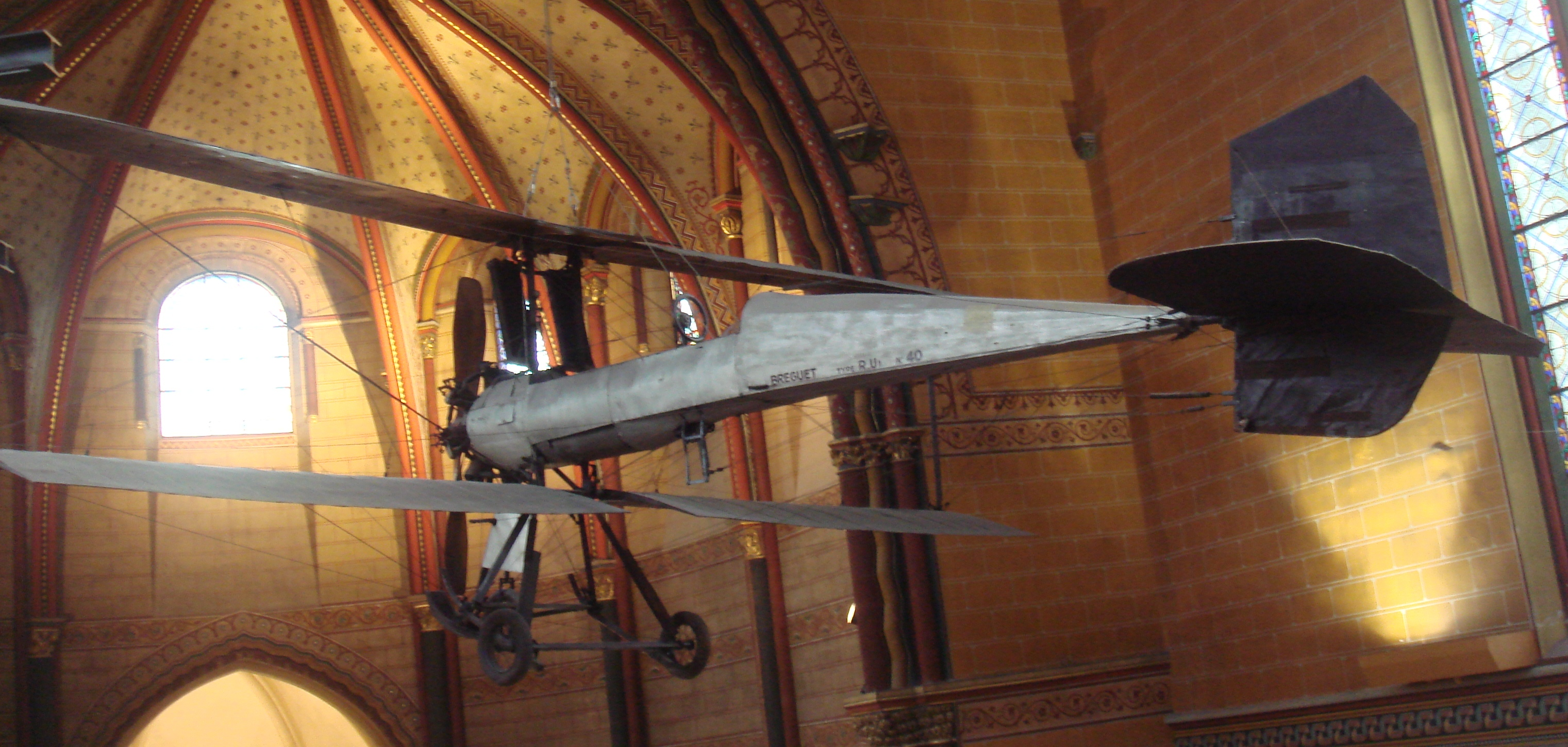
Breguet U.1 at the Musée des Arts et Métiers

An example, a U.1, is on display at the Musée des Arts et Métiers in Paris.

== Specifications (L-1 Cruiser) ==
Data from Flight, 22 July 1911, p. 625

General characteristics

- Crew: 1
- Capacity: 1
- Length: 8.5 m (28 ft)
- Upper wingspan: 13.94 m (45 ft 9 in)
- Lower wingspan: 8.74 m (28 ft 8 in)
- Wing area: 30.43 m^{2} (327.5 sq ft)
- Empty weight: 544 kg (1,200 lb)
- Powerplant: 1 × Renault 50/60 hp air-cooled V8
- Propellers: 2.4 m (8 ft) diameter
