= Bréguet 5 =

Bre.5, Bre.6, and Bre.12
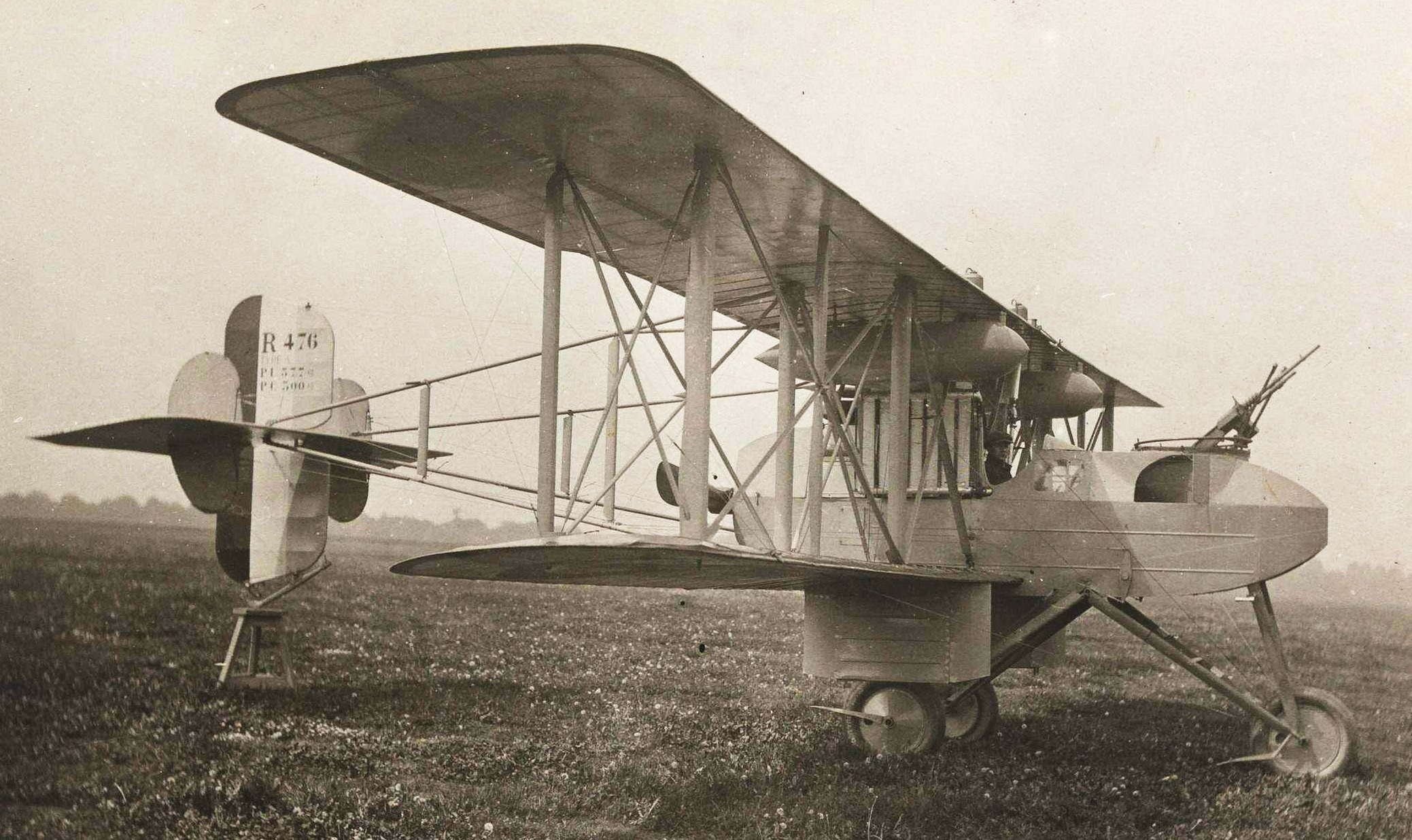

General information
- Type: Bomber & Escort fighter
- Manufacturer: Breguet
- Status: retired
- Primary users: Aéronautique Militaire (France) Royal Naval Air Service (UK)

History
- Introduction date: 1916
- First flight: 1915

The Breguet Bre.V B.2 bomber and Breguet Bre.V Ca.2 escort fighter were French biplanes of World War I which were developments of the Breguet Bre.IV bomber. The Bre.VI and Bre.XII were, in turn, developments of the Bre.V

== Design and development ==
This aircraft was a refinement of the escort fighter that Breguet Aviation had designed and was manufactured by Michelin as the Breguet-Michelin BUC. Initially intended to carry the same 37 mm (1.5 in) Hotchkiss cannon that armed the BUC, the Bre.5 was revised at the request of the French Army to carry a 7.7 mm (0.30 in) Lewis Gun fired rearward from atop the biplane's upper wing.

== Operational history ==
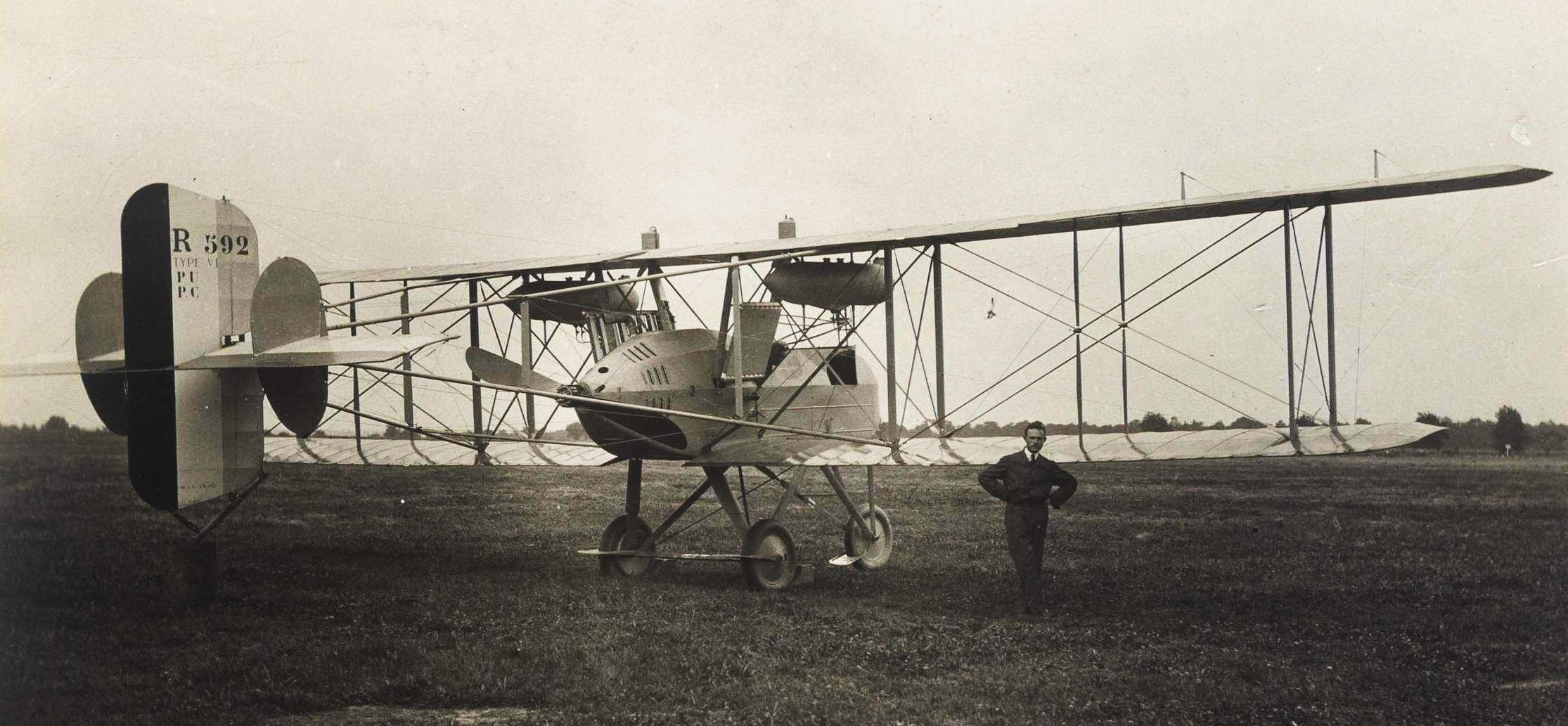
Bréguet Bre.VI, with buried Canton-Unné radial engine

A small number of cannon-armed machines were produced from April 1916 onwards and allotted to bomber units. The British Royal Naval Air Service operated 35 of which ten came from Bréguet, and 25 were built in the United Kingdom by Grahame-White as the G.W.19.

The Bre.6 was similar, but powered by a buried 240 hp (180 kW) Canton-Unné A9 radial engine, and was developed in case production of the Bre.5's Renault engine was unable to keep up with demand. It was also produced both as an escort fighter and as a bomber.

As the Bre.5 reached obsolescence, a number were rebuilt as Bre.12 night fighters and night bombers. The fighter carried a 37 mm (1.5 in) cannon and a searchlight, and had a double nosewheel distinguishing it from previous versions.

== Variants ==
Bre.5
Renault-powered version.

Bre 5 B.2

Bomber version.

Bre.5 Ca.2

Cannon-armed escort fighter version.

Grahame White G.W.19

British-built version for RNAS with Rolls-Royce Falcon engine.

Bre.6
Canton-Unné-powered version.

Bre.6 B.2

Bomber version.

Bre.6Ca.2

Cannon-armed escort fighter.

Bre.12
Bre.5s remanufactured for night fighting

Bre.12 B.2

Night bomber.

Bre.12 Ca.2

Cannon-armed night fighter.

== Operators ==
France

- French Army

Romania

- Romanian Air Corps

United Kingdom

- Royal Naval Air Service

== Specifications (Bre.5 Ca.2) ==
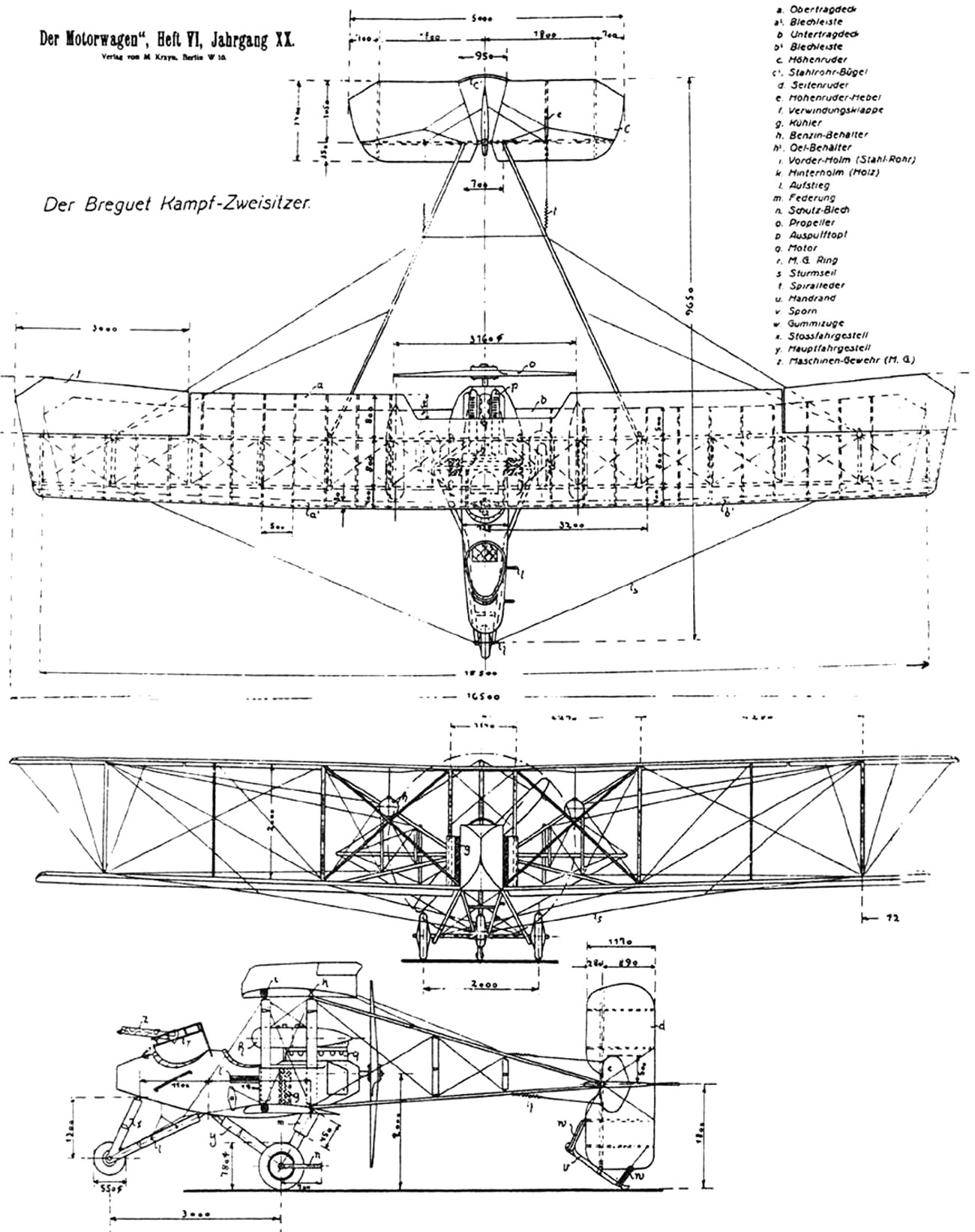
Breguet 5 drawing

General characteristics

- Crew: two, pilot and gunner
- Length: 9.90 m (32 ft 10 in)
- Wingspan: 17.50 m (57 ft 8 in)
- Height: 3.90 m (12 ft 9 in)
- Wing area: 57.7 m^{2} (621 sq ft)
- Empty weight: 1,347 kg (2,970 lb)
- Gross weight: 1,886 kg (4,158 lb)
- Powerplant: 1 × Renault 12Fb , 164 kW (220 hp)

Performance

- Maximum speed: 136 km/h (83 mph, 72 kn)
- Range: 700 km (435 mi, 378 nmi)
- Endurance: 6 hours 15 minutes
- Service ceiling: 4,300 m (14,110 ft)
- Rate of climb: 1.2 m/s (236 ft/min)

Armament

- 1 × trainable 37 mm (1.46 in) Hotchkiss cannon in front cockpit

== See also ==
- Ago C.I
- Royal Aircraft Factory F.E.2
- Voisin V
