= Renault 50/60 hp =

1900s French piston aircraft engine

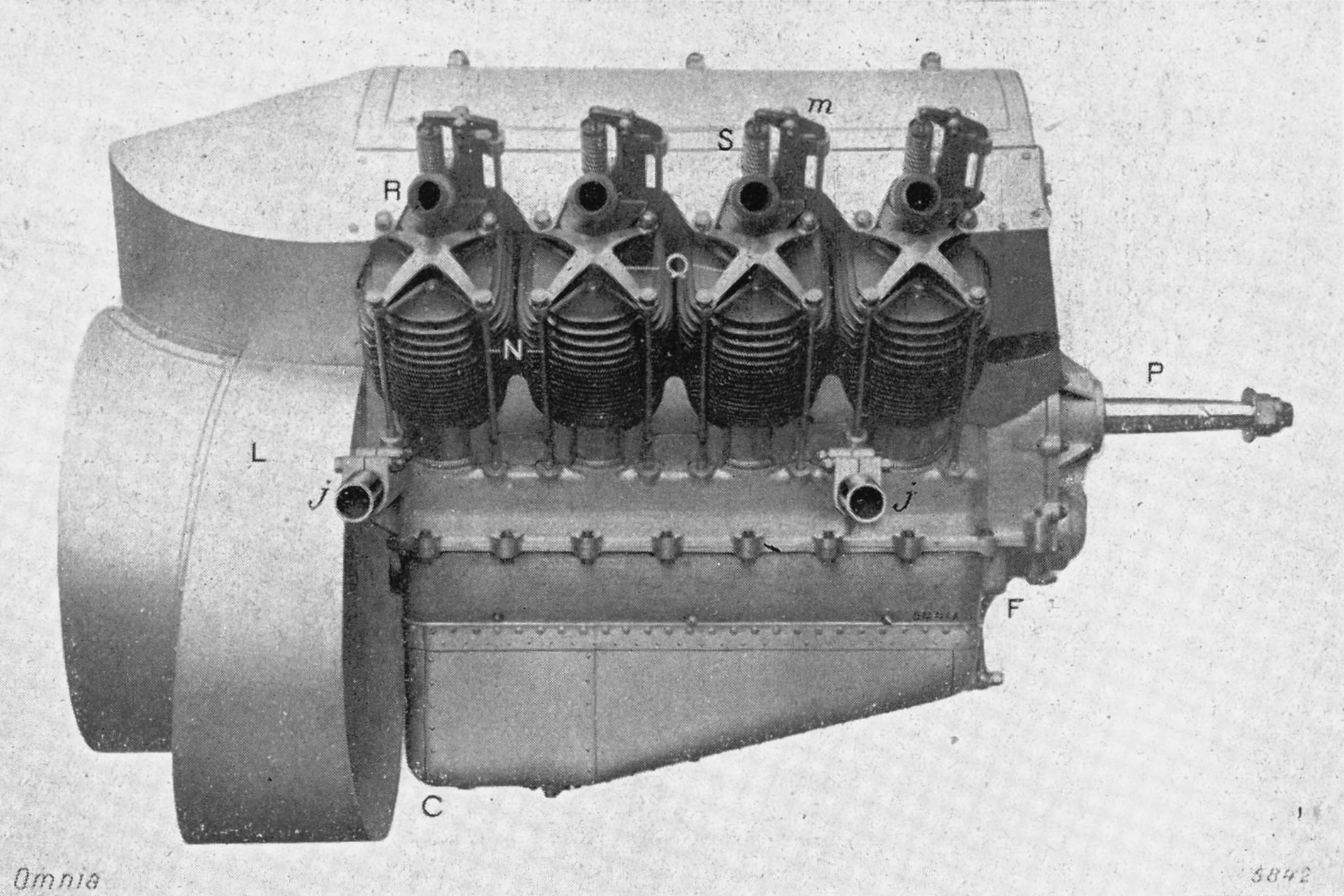
- Renault 50/60 hp aircraft engine, c. 1910/11
- Type: Piston inline aero engine
- National origin: France
- Manufacturer: Renault
- First run: c. 1908
- Developed into: Renault 70 hp

The Renault 50/60 hp aircraft engines were a series of air cooled 90° V8 engines with a bore and stroke of 90 mm × 120 mm (3.5 in × 4.7 in) built by the French Renault company in the years from 1908 to about 1911.

== Design and development ==
The first precursor of the Renault 50/60 hp engine was an air-cooled V8 engine of approximately 40–45 hp (30–34 kW) presented on the Salon de l’Automobile 1907, which has been intended for aircraft and dirigibles and was cooled by two separate fans on both ends of the engine. In 1908 the air-cooled Renault 50/60 hp evolved from that design, using a single fan and therefore allowing the propeller shaft being geared down and combined with the camshaft on the other end of the engine.

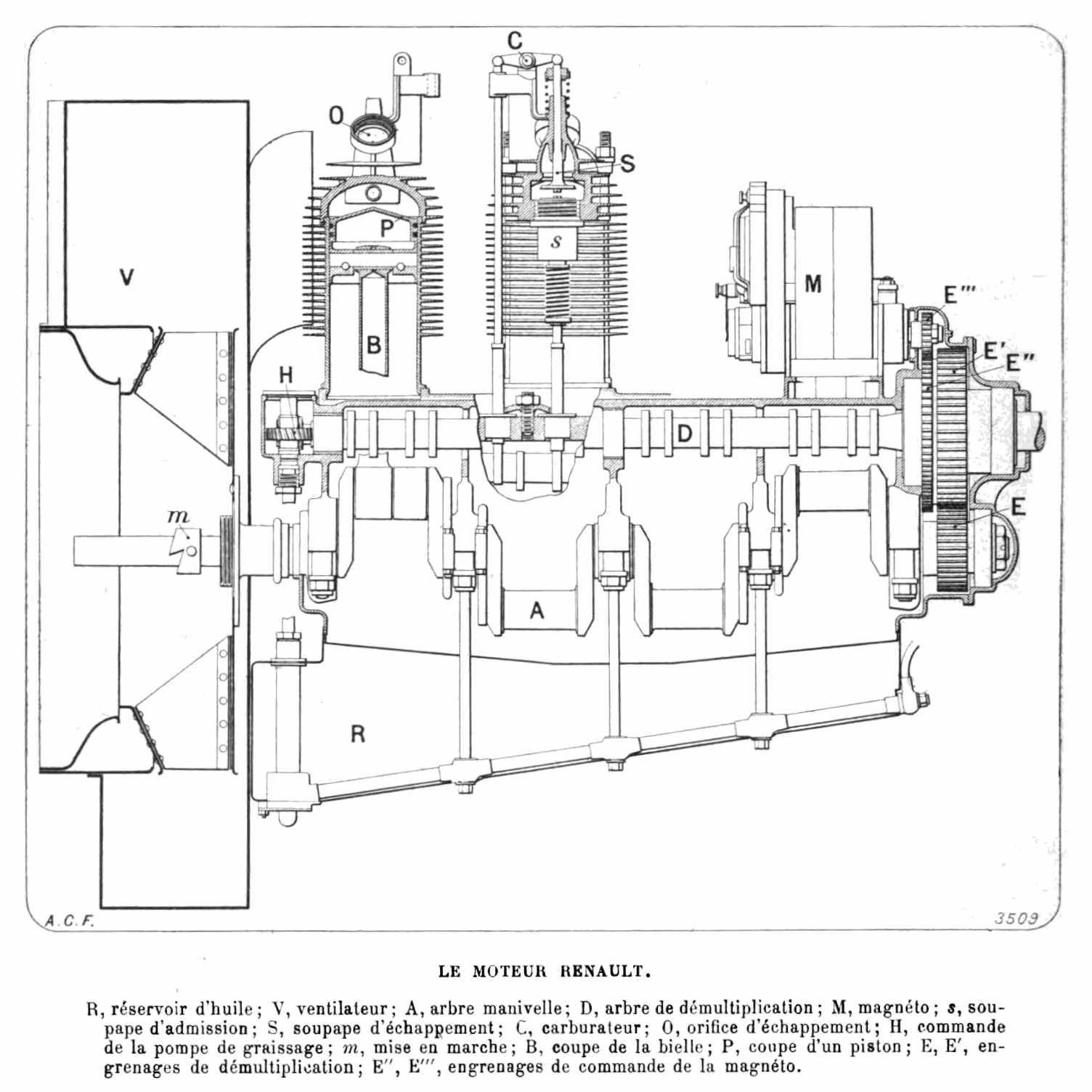
Renault 50/60 hp engine, 1909

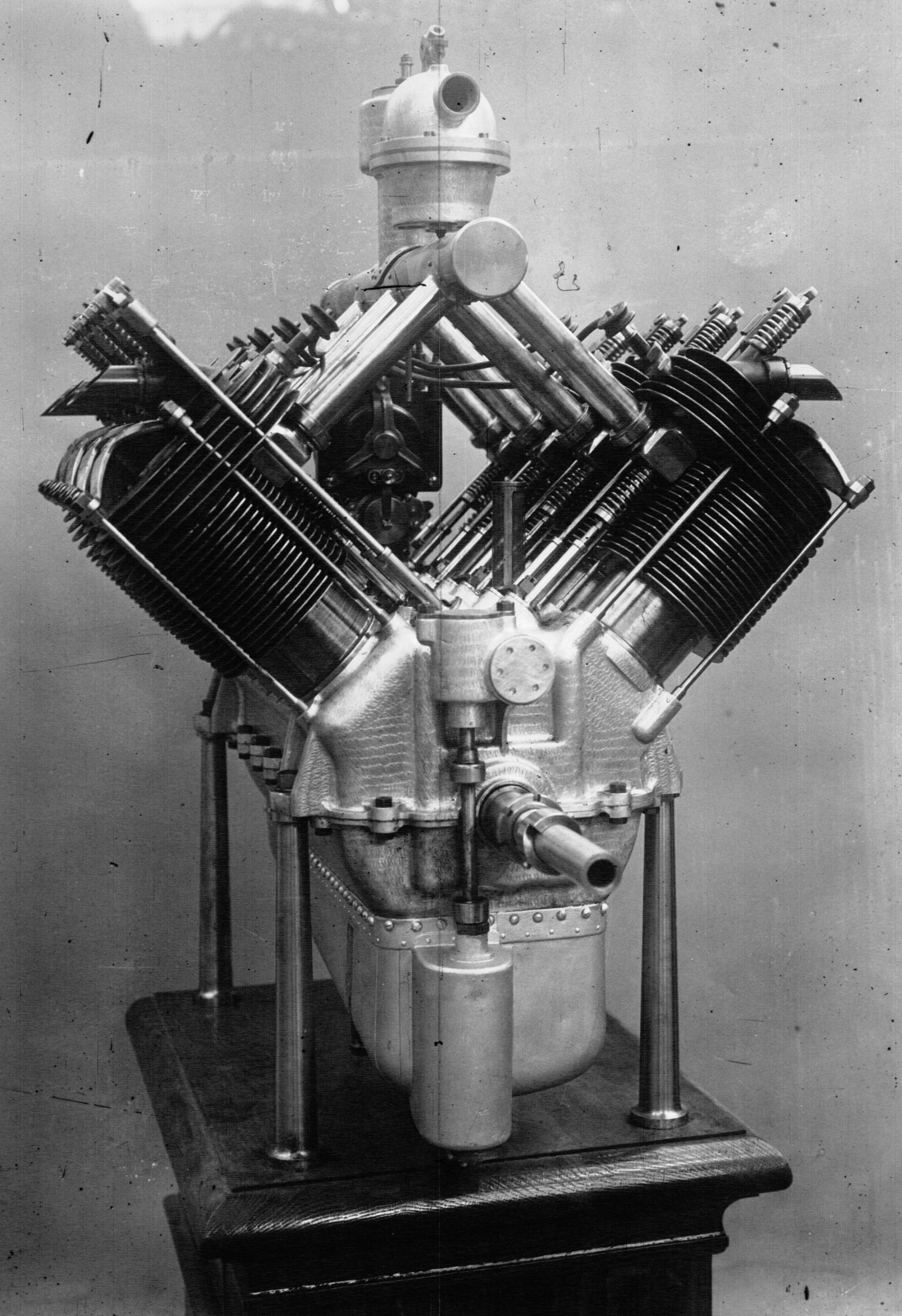
Renault 50/60 hp engine at the Salon Aéronautique, 1909

The Renault 50/60 hp engine had two rows of four cylinders angled at 90-degree to each other and had a bore and stroke of 90 mm × 120 mm (3.5 in × 4.7 in). The cylinders and cylinder heads were separate cast-iron pieces with cast fins for air-cooling. The cylinder heads were secured by a cross-shaped clamp which was bolted to the crankcase with four long studs. Airflow for cooling the cylinders was generated with a fan driven from the rear end of the crankshaft. The fan was blowing air into the sheet metal enclosed chamber between the two rows of cylinders, which then left the enclosure through the narrow spaces between the cylinders, passing through the cylinder's cooling-fins. Various shapes for the blower fan housing were tried, cylindrical and conical, until the definitive spiral-shaped form finally emerged in 1909.

A single camshaft was placed between the two rows of cylinders and operates the inlet and exhaust valves of both cylinder rows, with each valve operated by a separate cam on the camshaft. The inlet and exhaust valves sat vertically opposed in a lateral pocket of the cylinder head on the side of the combustion chamber, with the inlet valve situated below the exhaust valve. The inlet valve was operated directly from the camshaft via a tappet, whereas the exhaust valve was operated via a push rod and a rocker lever. The propeller was mounted directly on the camshaft, which was driven from the crankshaft via reduction gearing consisting of spur gears.

The crankshaft was supported by three intermediate plain bearings and three ball bearings, one on the fan end and the other two supporting the reduction gearing at the propeller end. The two rows of cylinders where staggered so that the connecting rods of each pair of opposing cylinders could be placed side by side the same crank journal.

The crankcase was cast from aluminium in separate upper and lower half parts. While initial versions of the engine in 1908 still had a flat crankcase bottom, subsequent versions in 1909 had a separate oil reservoir attached below the crankcase. A geared oil pump fed the oil from the reservoir to the crankshaft bearings. The oil pump was located at the back of the oil reservoir and was driven over a vertical shaft from the end of the camshaft via helical gears. Later models around 1911 had the oil pump moved slightly forward to the bottom of the oil reservoir, driven via a vertical shaft from the camshaft just before the rearmost cylinders. Likewise the engine mounting was changed on the later models from the vertically aligned mounting holes on the upper crankcase part to transversely aligned steel tubes passing to through the upper crankcase part.

A Renault-type carburetor, made from aluminium, fed the cylinders via intake manifold pipes between the cylinder rows. Ignition was supplied by a single Bosch magneto for all 8 cylinders. The magneto was mounted on top of the reduction gearing assembly at the propeller end, and was driven from the camshaft via spur gears.

The engine was tested at the Concours de Moteurs pour l'Aviation in 1909, where it was found to develop 60.5 CV (44.5 kW) at 1,835.8 rpm (917.9 rpm on the propeller) on average and weighing 179.5 kg (396 lb) including all accessories.

== Applications ==
- Bréguet Type I
- Bréguet Type II
- Bréguet L.1
- Biplan M. Farman, flown at the Grand Prix Michelin 1911

== Specifications (Renault 50/60 hp) ==
Data from Angle

=== General characteristics ===
- Type: air-cooled 90-degree V8 piston aircraft engine
- Bore: 90 mm (3.543 in)
- Stroke: 120 mm (4.724 in)
- Displacement: 6.11 L (373 cu in)
- Length: 1,232 mm (48.5 in)
- Width: 673 mm (26.5 in)
- Height: 648 mm (25.5 in)
- Dry weight: 169 kg (373 lb)

=== Components ===
- Cooling system: Air-cooled
- Reduction gear: 0.5:1

=== Performance ===
- Power output: 60 hp (45 kW) at 1,800 rpm

== See also ==
Related development

- Renault 70 hp

Related lists

- List of aircraft engines
