= Torque effect =

Torque effect is an effect experienced in helicopters and single propeller-powered aircraft is an example of Isaac Newton's third law of motion, that "for every action, there is an equal and opposite reaction."

In helicopters, the torque effect causes the main rotor to turn the fuselage in the opposite direction from the rotor's spin. A small tail rotor is the most common configuration to counter this phenomenon.

In a single-propeller plane, the torque effect causes the plane to turn upwards and left in response to the propeller turning the plane in the opposite direction of the propeller's clockwise spin.
