= Breguet-Richet Gyroplane =

French experimental quadcopter rotary-wing aircraft

Gyroplane No.I and No.II
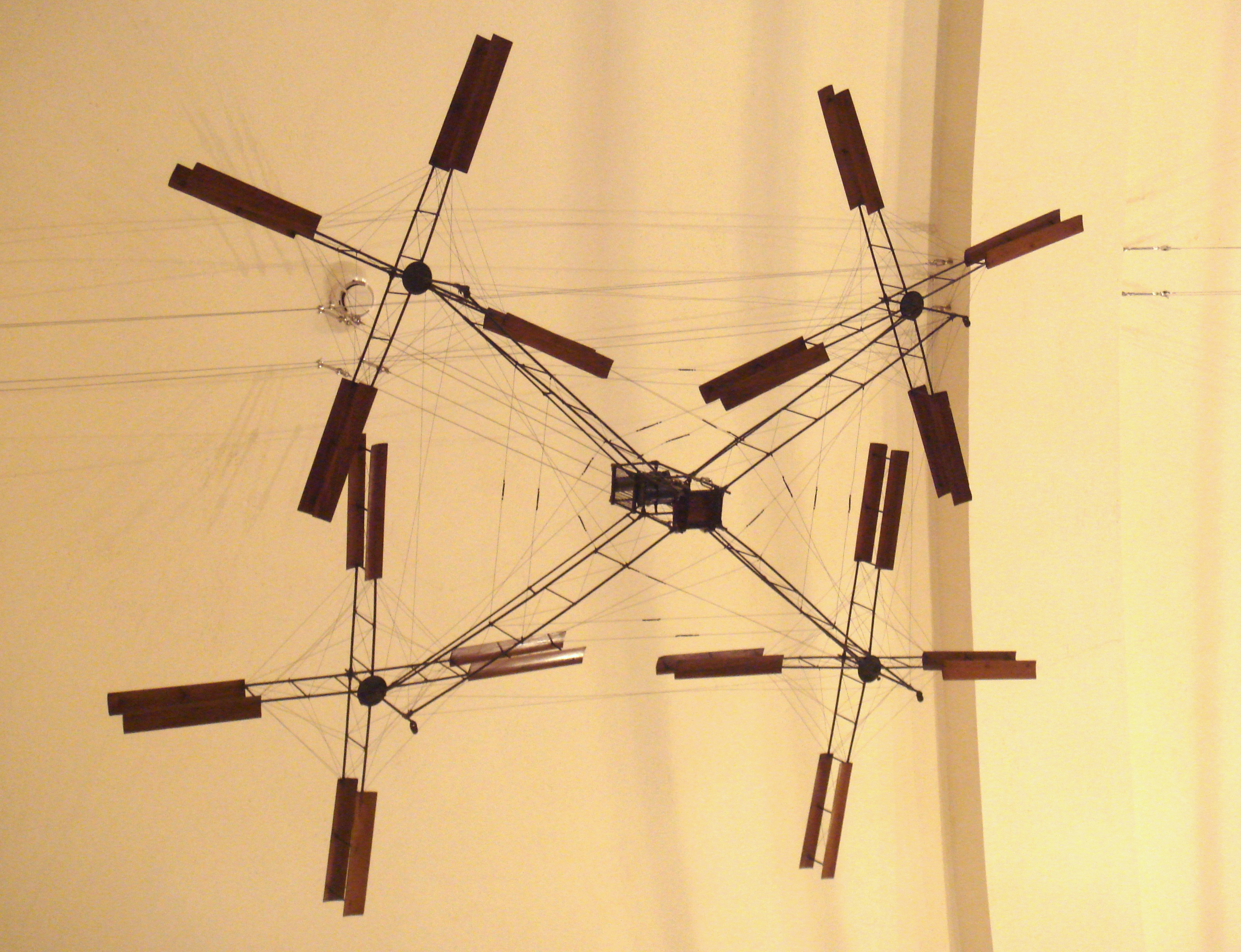
- Model of the Bréguet-Richet Gyroplane No.1.

General information
- Type: Rotary-wing test vehicle
- Manufacturer: Breguet Aviation
- Designer: Louis Breguet
- Number built: 2

History
- First flight: 29 September 1907

The Breguet-Richet Gyroplane was an early French experimental quadcopter rotary-wing aircraft developed by Breguet Aviation.

== Design and development ==
The Gyroplane No.I was one of the earliest attempts to create a practical rotary-wing aircraft. It was designed by the Bréguet brothers with help from Professor Charles Richet. The aircraft had an uncovered open steel framework with a seat for the pilot and a powerplant at the centre. Radiating from the central structure were four wire-braced tubular steel arms, each bearing a superimposed pair of four-bladed rotors. To eliminate the torque effect, two rotor sets were driven clockwise and two counter-clockwise.

== Operational service ==
On 29 September 1907, the Gyroplane No.I was flown for the first time, albeit to an elevation of only 0.6 metres (2.0 ft). It was not a free flight, as four men were used to steady the structure. It was neither controllable nor steerable, but it was the first time that a rotary-wing device had lifted itself and a pilot into the air. It later flew up to 1.52 m (4.99 ft) above the ground. The design was improved and the Gyroplane No.II appeared the following year. No.II had two two-blade rotors of 7.85 m (25.75 ft) diameter and also had fixed wings. Powered by a 41 kW (55 hp) Renault engine, it was reported to have flown successfully more than once in 1908. No.II was damaged in a heavy landing and was rebuilt as the No.IIbis. It flew at least once in April 1909 before being destroyed when the company's works were badly damaged in a severe storm.

== Specifications (No.I) ==
General characteristics

- Crew: one
- Height: 3.7 m (12 ft 2 in)
- Empty weight: 500 kg (1,102 lb)
- Gross weight: 578 kg (1,274 lb)
- Powerplant: 1 × Antoinette water-cooled piston engine, 34 kW (46 hp)
- Main rotor diameter: 4 × 8 m (26 ft 3 in)
- Main rotor area: 402.2 m^{2} (4,329 sq ft) biplane rotors

Performance

- Endurance: 1 minute
- Service ceiling: 0.6 m (2.0 ft)

== See also ==
Aircraft of comparable role, configuration, and era

- Cornu helicopter
- de Bothezat helicopter
