= Paris-Rhône =

Electric car manufacturer

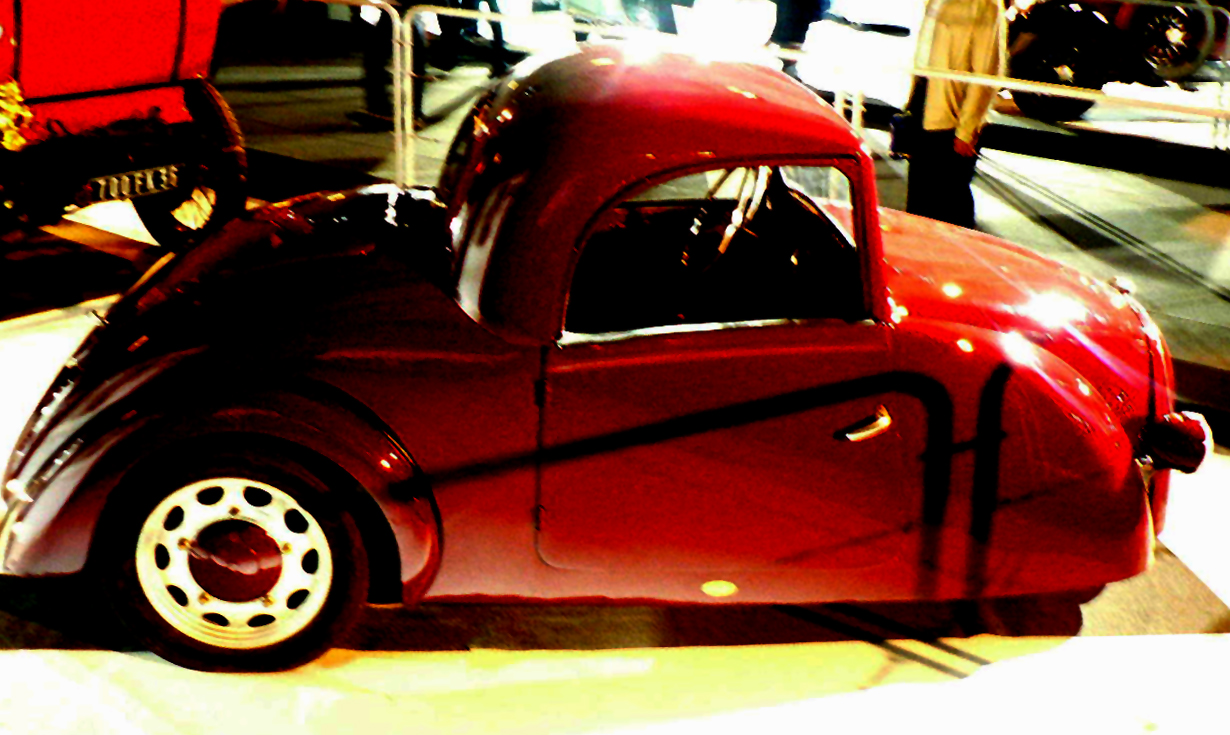

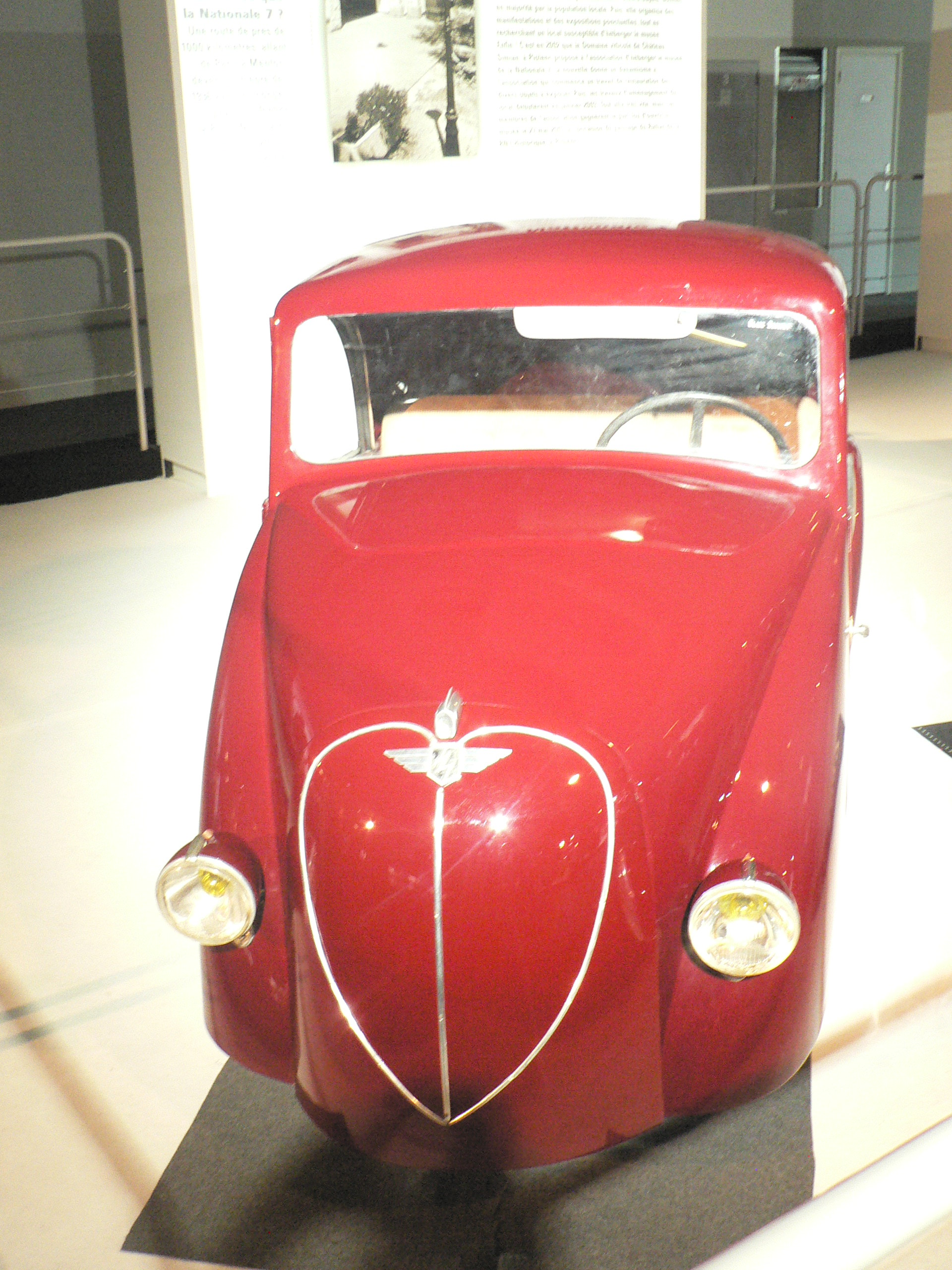

Paris-Rhône was a French producer of small three-wheeler electric cars based in Lyon. The vehicle was first presented in 1941 and production ended in 1950.

== Origins ==
By the time of the Second World War, the Lyon based Paris-Rhône company had been in business as a supplier of specialist electric components to the auto-industry for approximately twenty years, which made them particularly well placed to join the electric cars band wagon that gathered pace after the German invasion of 1940 as petrol for civilian use became virtually unobtainable in France. Unlike many converts to the manufacture of electric cars, Paris-Rhône would have no problems producing their own electric motors in house.

== The car ==
The company produced only electric cars. The first three-wheeler, the Paris-Rhône VPR, was presented to the public in the spring of 1941. It was just 2,500 mm (98.4 in) long and 1,200 mm (47.2 in) wide, weighing approximately 450 kg (992 lb) of which 210 kg was accounted for by six large batteries located under and behind the seat and mounted on a cradle that also accommodated the motor which drove the two rear wheels. The front wheel was mounted on a motor-cycle style fork, but the mechanism was concealed from view by the body work. The electric motor appears to have been an existing unit from the company’s range, and delivered 2.5 hp at 2,300 rpm. A top speed of 30 km/h (19 mph) and a range of approximately 65 kilometers (40 miles) were quoted. The three-wheeled car had one bench seat suitable for two thin people and featured a simple cabriolet body.

A single seater utility version with 125 kg of load capacity was also offered, using the same basic engine type (model TA 14), but in this version the engine tension was only 24 volts as against 36 volts for the two person vehicle, and performance claims for the utility version were correspondingly more modest.

The design was developed by an engineer called Henri Lanoy who the next year produced an updated version called the Baby-Rhône with a closed top body and a slightly less basic arrangement for the front wheel, now incorporating an element of suspension. An updated version of this vehicle, the Baby-Rhône II, was exhibited for the first time at the Lyon Fair in 1942. The little “coupé” body was produced by a coach building company called Faurax et Chassende who had their premises on the “Saint-Priest Road” in Lyon, a few hundred meters along the road from Paris-Rhône’s own factory.

== Enthusiasts ==
A 1942 Paris-Rhône can be seen, in 2011, at the Musée Automobile de Provence at Orgon in south-east France.

== Sources and further reading ==
- G.N. Georgano: Autos. Encyclopédie complète. 1885 à nos jours. Courtille, 1975 (in French)

https://www.valeo.com/en/our-story/
