= Breguet-Dorand Gyroplane Laboratoire =

1930s helicopter prototype

Gyroplane Laboratoire
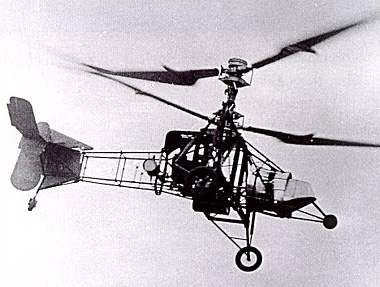
- Gyroplane-Laboratoire, 1933

General information
- Type: Prototype helicopter
- Manufacturer: Breguet/Dorand
- Designer: Louis Breguet
- Status: Destroyed
- Number built: 1

History
- First flight: 26 June 1935

The Gyroplane Laboratoire was an early helicopter. Its designer, Frenchman Louis Breguet, had already experimented with rotorcraft in 1909; however, he chose to concentrate on airplanes until the end of the 1920s. In 1929 he announced a set of patents which addressed the flight stabilization of rotorcraft, and, in 1931, Breguet created the Syndicat d'Etudes de Gyroplane (French for "Syndicate for Gyroplane Studies"), together with Rene Dorand as technical director. Their goal was the development of an experimental helicopter, the Gyroplane Laboratoire.

== Design ==
The aircraft consisted of an open steel tube framework, within which the engine, fuel tank, controls and pilot were situated, together with a tail assembly with plywood tail surfaces. The tailwheel landing gear was installed with the mainwheels on outriggers and with an additional small wheel at the front to avoid nosing-over during landing. Power was provided by a 240 HP Hispano radial engine which propelled the two contra-rotating, coaxial rotors. The coaxial rotor design was chosen because with the rotors turning in opposite directions the torque from one rotor was canceled out by the torque produced by the other rotor.

The two twin-bladed rotors made of metal were shaped like arrows and incorporated both cyclic and collective pitch blade control, with which movement around the pitch and roll axis was controlled, as well as climb and descent.

== Operational history ==
The Bréguet Dorand aircraft was finished in 1933. After ground tests and an accident, the first flight took place on 26 June 1935. Within a short time the pilot, Maurice Claisse, was setting records with the aircraft :

- 14 December 1935: Closed-circuit flight with 500 m diameters
- 26 September 1936: Height of 158 m
- 24 November 1936: Flight duration of 1:02:50 hours over a 44 km closed circuit at 44.7 km/h
- Maximum speed 120 km/h

The Gyroplane Laboratoire and its accomplishments were soon overshadowed by the German Fw 61. Bréguet and Dorand continued to conduct further experiments to improve the design until the aircraft experienced a hard landing in June 1939. Development was abandoned with the outbreak of World War II. The only prototype was destroyed in 1943 during an Allied air attack on the airfield at Villacoublay.

== Specifications (Gyroplane Laboratoire) ==
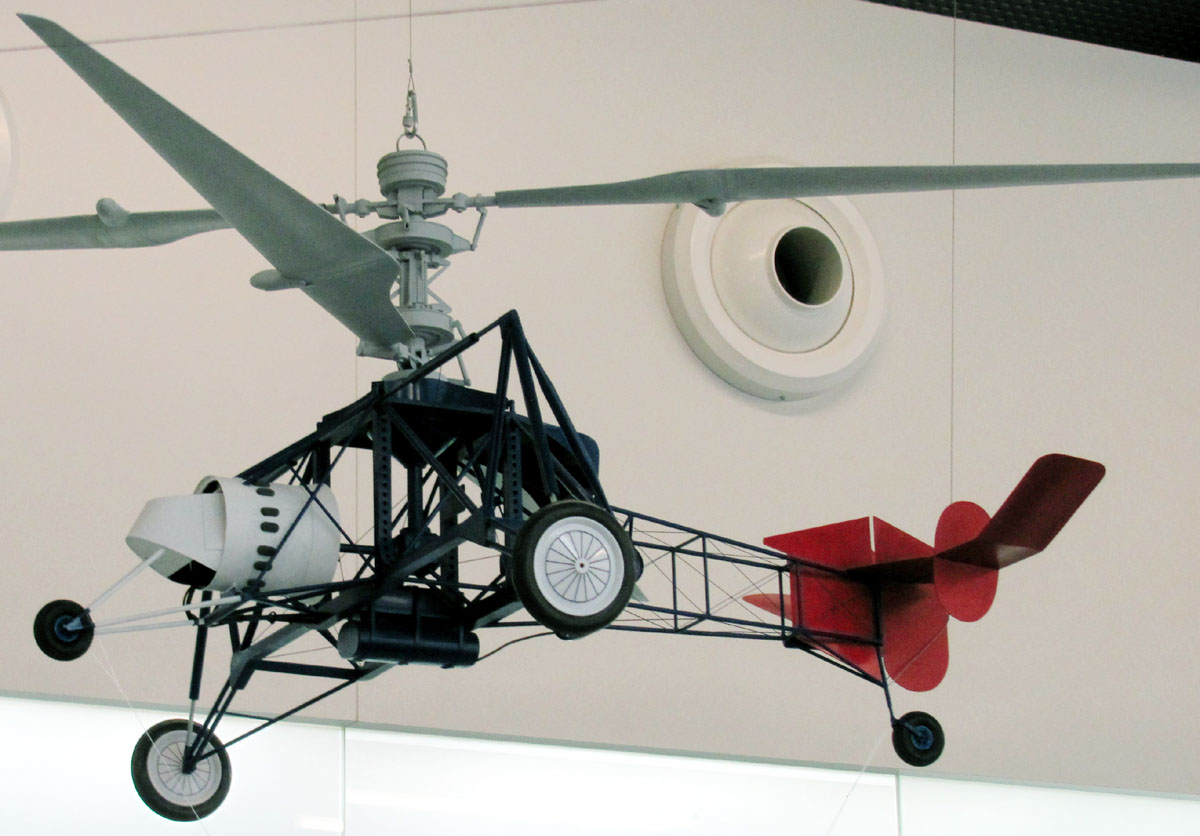
Model of the "Gyroplane Laboratoire" in scale of 1 : 11 as shown in the Hubschraubermuseum Bückeburg (Helicopter Museum)

Data from

General characteristics

- Crew: 1
- Length: 8.92 m (29 ft 3 in)
- Height: 2.79 m (9 ft 2 in)
- Empty weight: 1,430 kg (3,153 lb)
- Max takeoff weight: 1,950 kg (4,299 lb)
- Powerplant: 1 × Hispano-Suiza 8F V-8 water-cooled piston erngine, 225 kW (302 hp)
- Main rotor diameter: 15.89 m (52 ft 2 in)
- Main rotor area: 198.33 m^{2} (2,134.8 sq ft)

Performance

- Maximum speed: 120 km/h (75 mph, 65 kn)
- Range: 44 km (27 mi, 24 nmi)
- Service ceiling: 158 m (518 ft) achieved

== See also ==
Related lists

- List of rotorcraft
