= Breguet Type I =

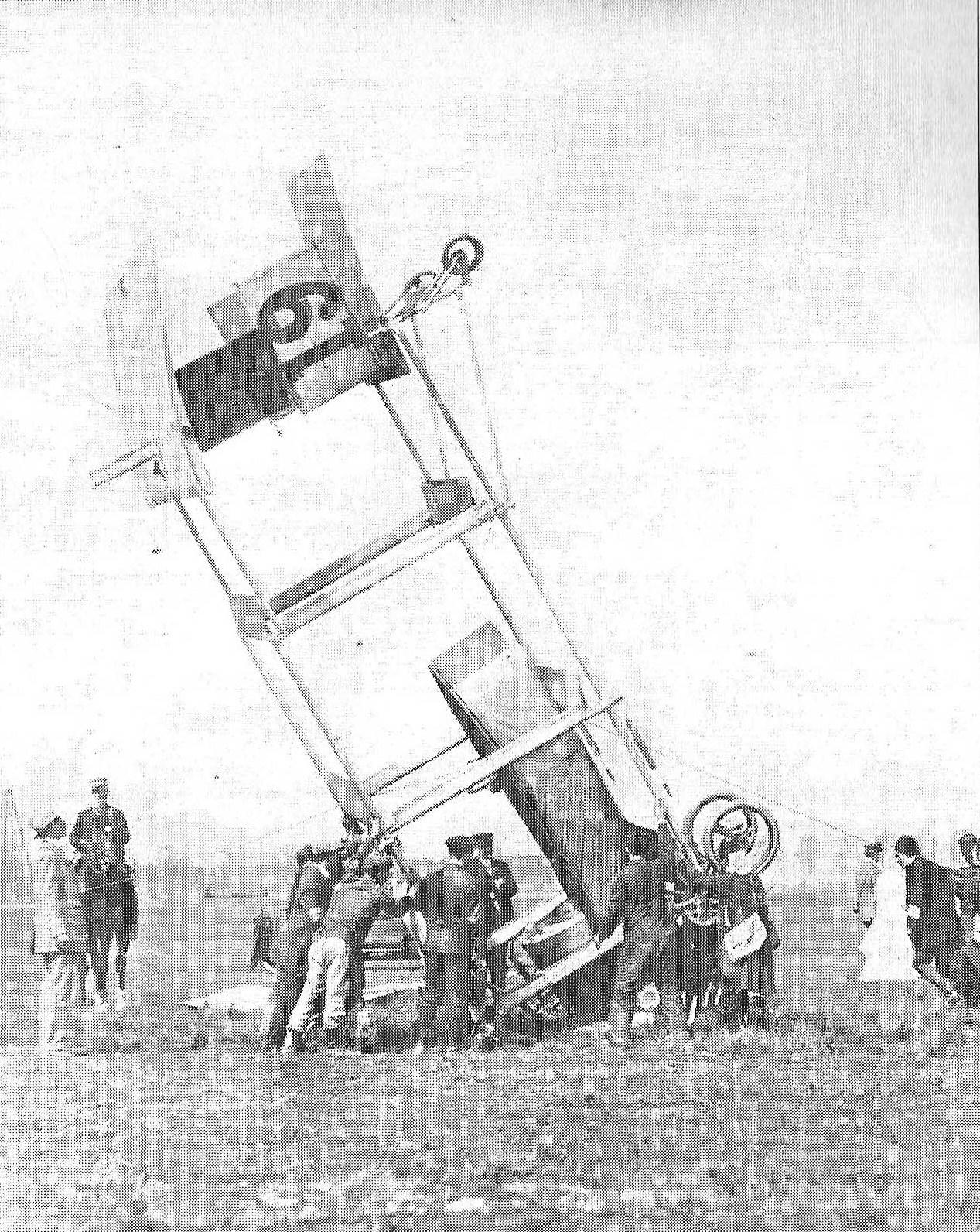
- Breguet Type I after accident at the Grande Semaine d'Aviation in August 1909

General information
- Type: Experimental aircraft
- National origin: France
- Manufacturer: Louis Breguet
- Designer: Louis Breguet
- Number built: 1

History
- First flight: 28 June 1909

The Breguet Type I was an experimental aircraft built in France in 1909. It was Louis Breguet's first fixed-wing aircraft design. Breguet had previously had some success with two helicopter designs, one of which had been exhibited at the Paris Aero Salon in December 1908. Because of these machines, the Type I was at first known as the Breguet Type III.

== Design ==
The Breguet Type I differed from most biplane designs of the time by being of tractor configuration and not having a forward elevator, as used by the Wright Brothers and Gabriel Voisin, and in using a steel structure when wood was the material of choice for most builders at the time. The engine was mounted at the front of the aircraft in a square section nacelle projecting forwards from the lower wing, driving a three-bladed propeller. The upper wing was built in three separate sections, with the entire outer sections pivoting about the main spar for control purposes, while the lower wings, which had a smaller wingspan, were divided into two pivoting planes, with a large gap between them in place of a centre section. The wings were connected by four steel tube interplane struts, each enclosed in a streamlined fairing. The tail surfaces were mounted on four cross-braced steel booms and consisted of a large-span upper elevator and a smaller lower surface, with a pair of rudders filling the gap between them. The undercarriage consisted of a pair of forward-projecting skids with a small wheel mounted between them, supplemented by outrigger wheels on each wingtip. Power was provided by a 60 hp (45 kW) Renault V-8 engine.

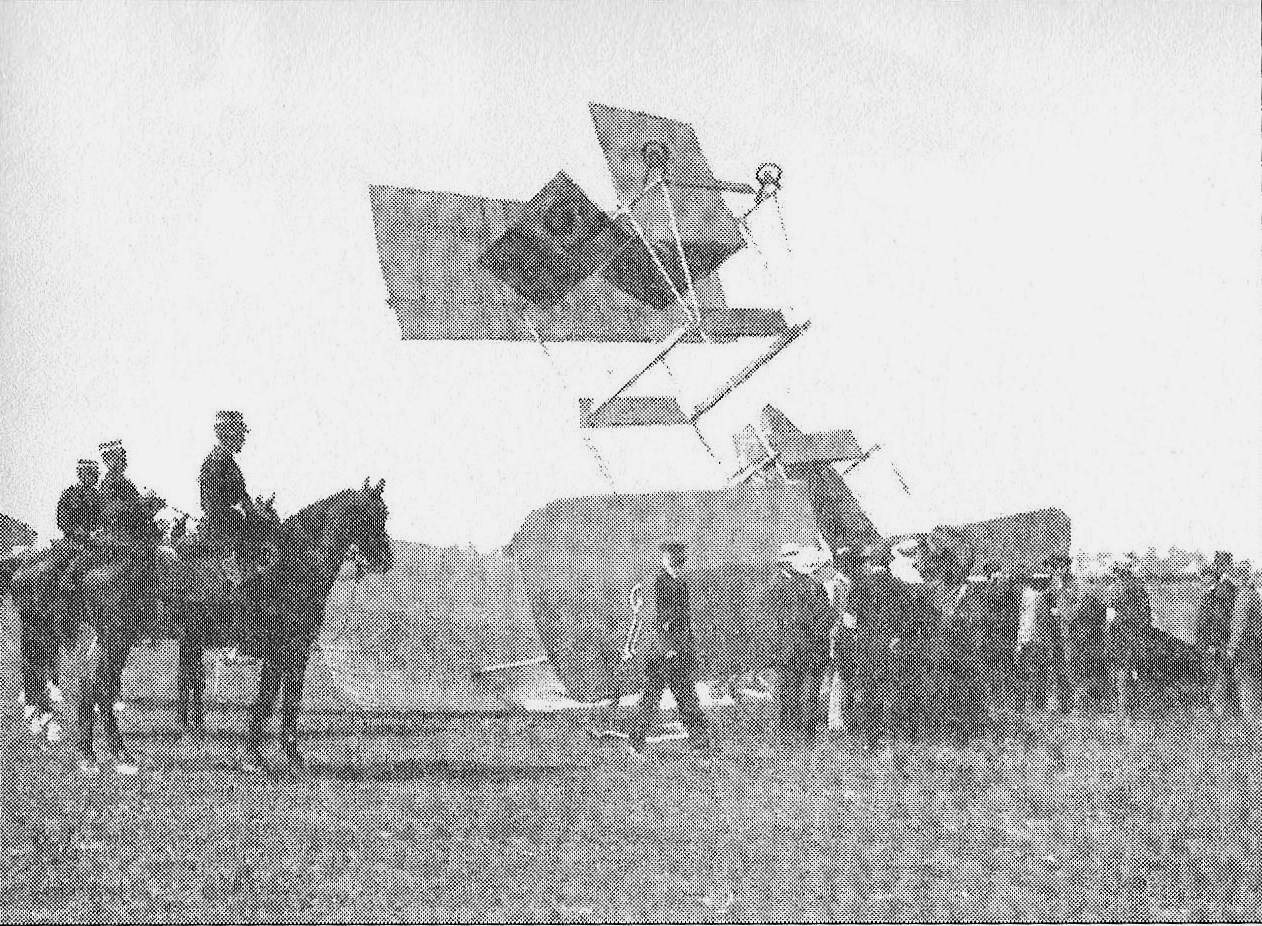
Another view of the Breguet Type I crash

The machine was displayed without an engine at the Olympia Aero Show in London in March 1909 and first took to the air on 28 June at La Brayelle Airfield. Breguet flew this aircraft, given the exhibition number 19, at the Grande Semaine d'Aviation in August, but crashed when the machine was caught in a gust of wind . Breguet himself was unharmed.

== Specifications ==
Data from Hartmann 2005, p.6

General characteristics

- Crew: one pilot
- Length: 9.15 m (30 ft 0 in)
- Wingspan: 13.70 m (44 ft 11 in)
- Wing area: 40.0 m^{2} (404 sq ft)
- Empty weight: 580 kg (1,300 lb)
- Gross weight: 800 kg (1,800 lb)
- Powerplant: 1 × Renault 50/60 hp , 45 kW (60 hp)

Performance

- Maximum speed: 60 km/h (40 mph, 35 kn)
