= Louis Charles Breguet =

French aircraft designer and builder (1880–1955)

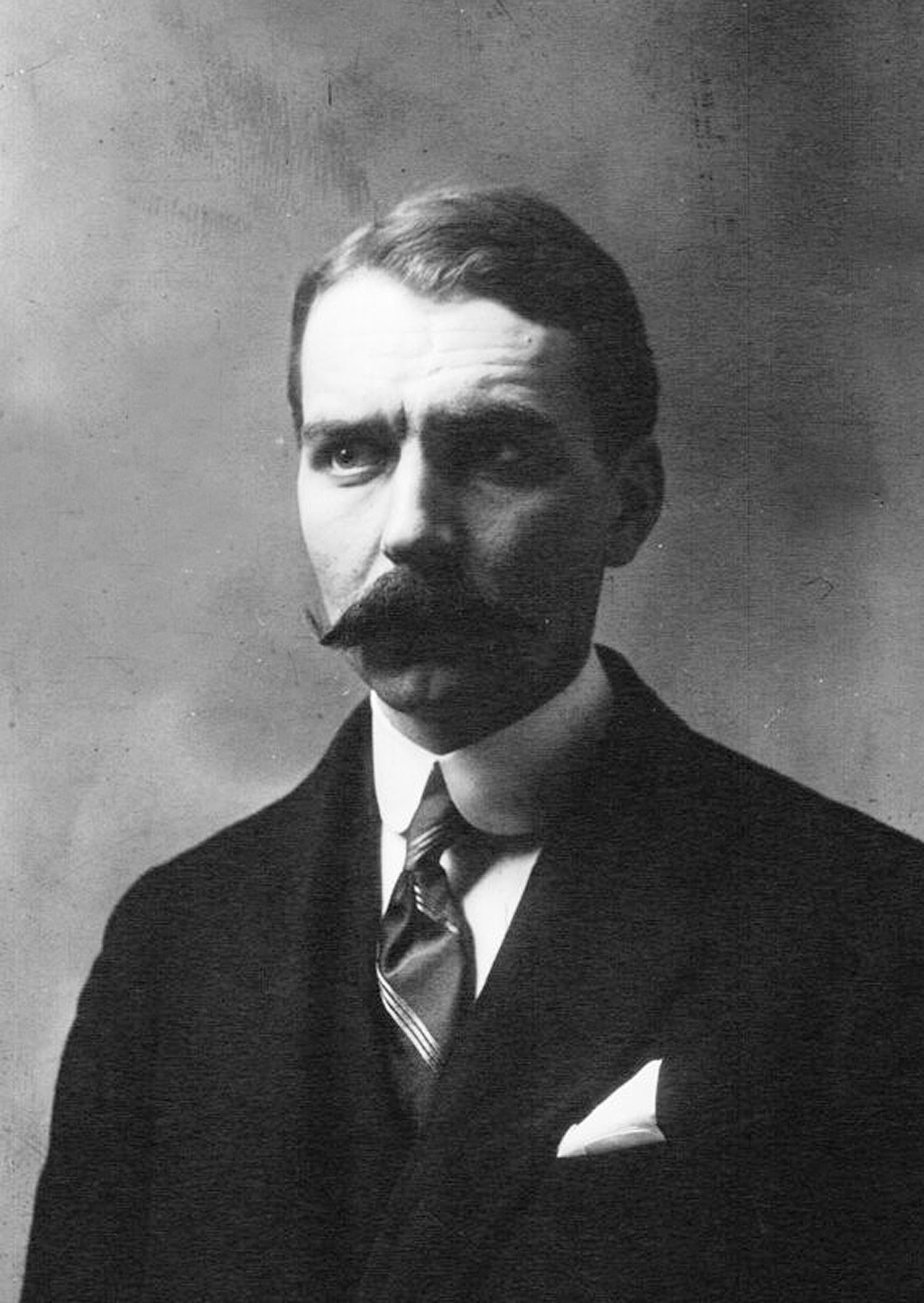
Louis Breguet in 1909

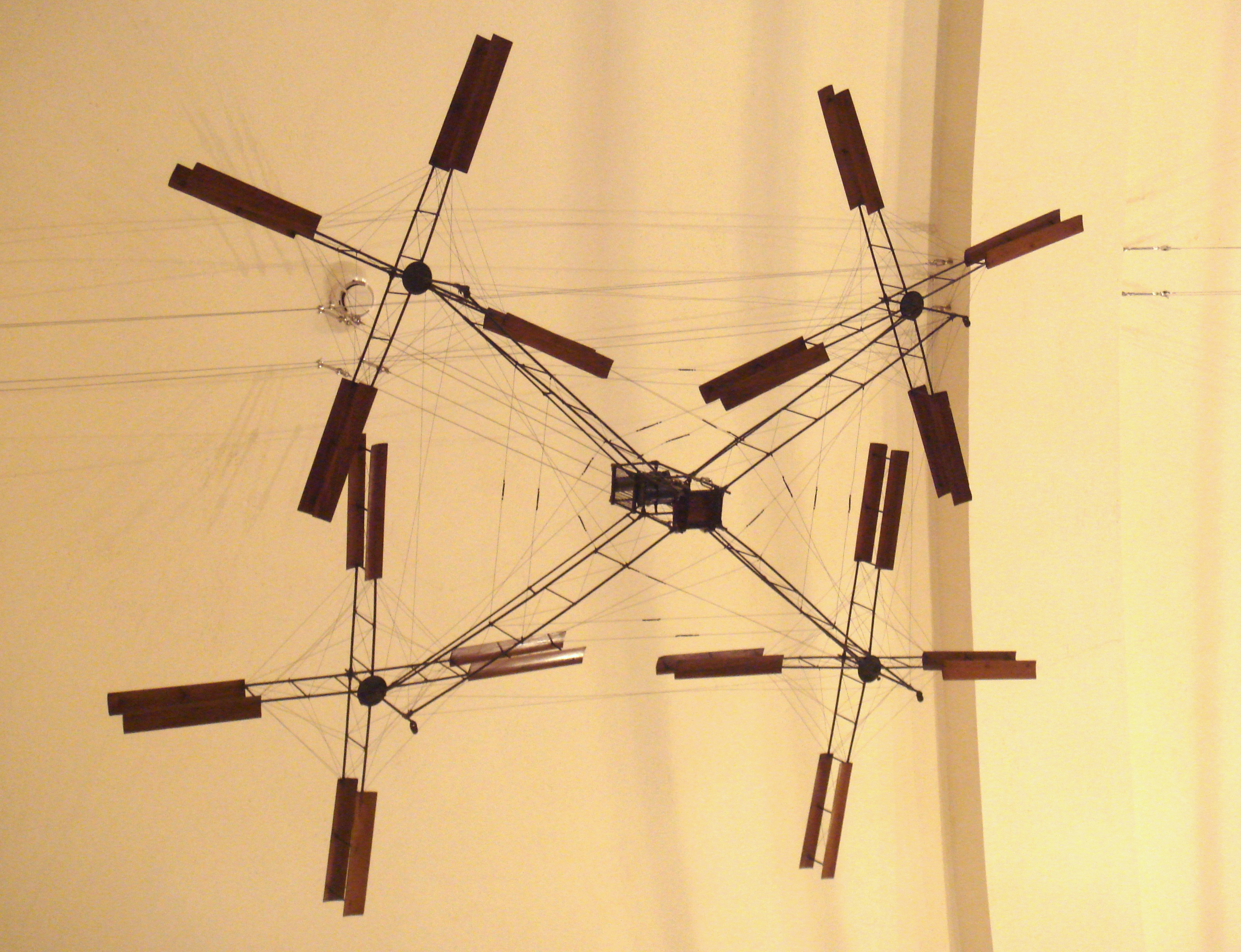
Breguet-Richet Gyroplane (1907). Musée des Arts et Métiers, Paris

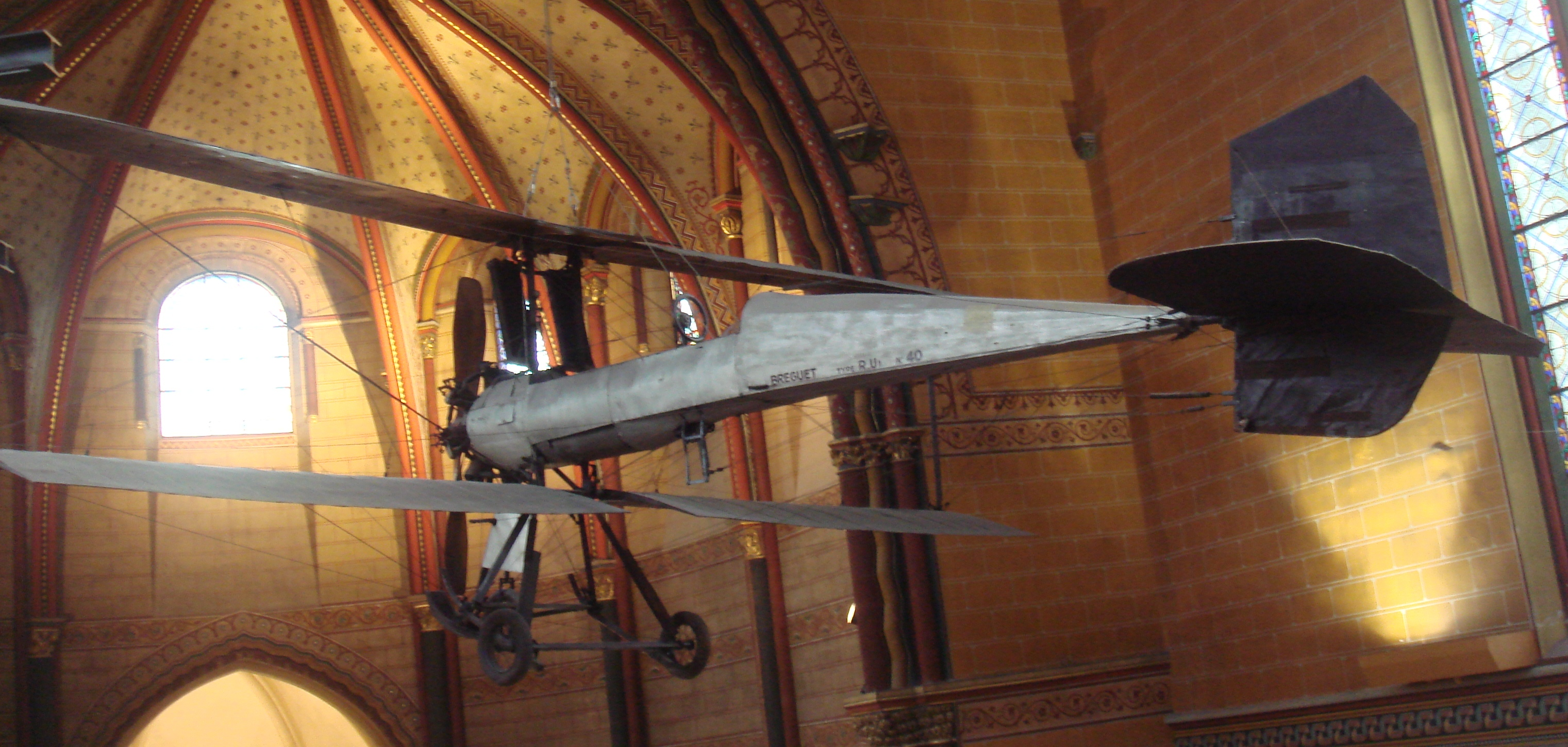
1911 Breguet biplane aeroplane Type R.U1 No.40. Musée des Arts et Métiers, Paris

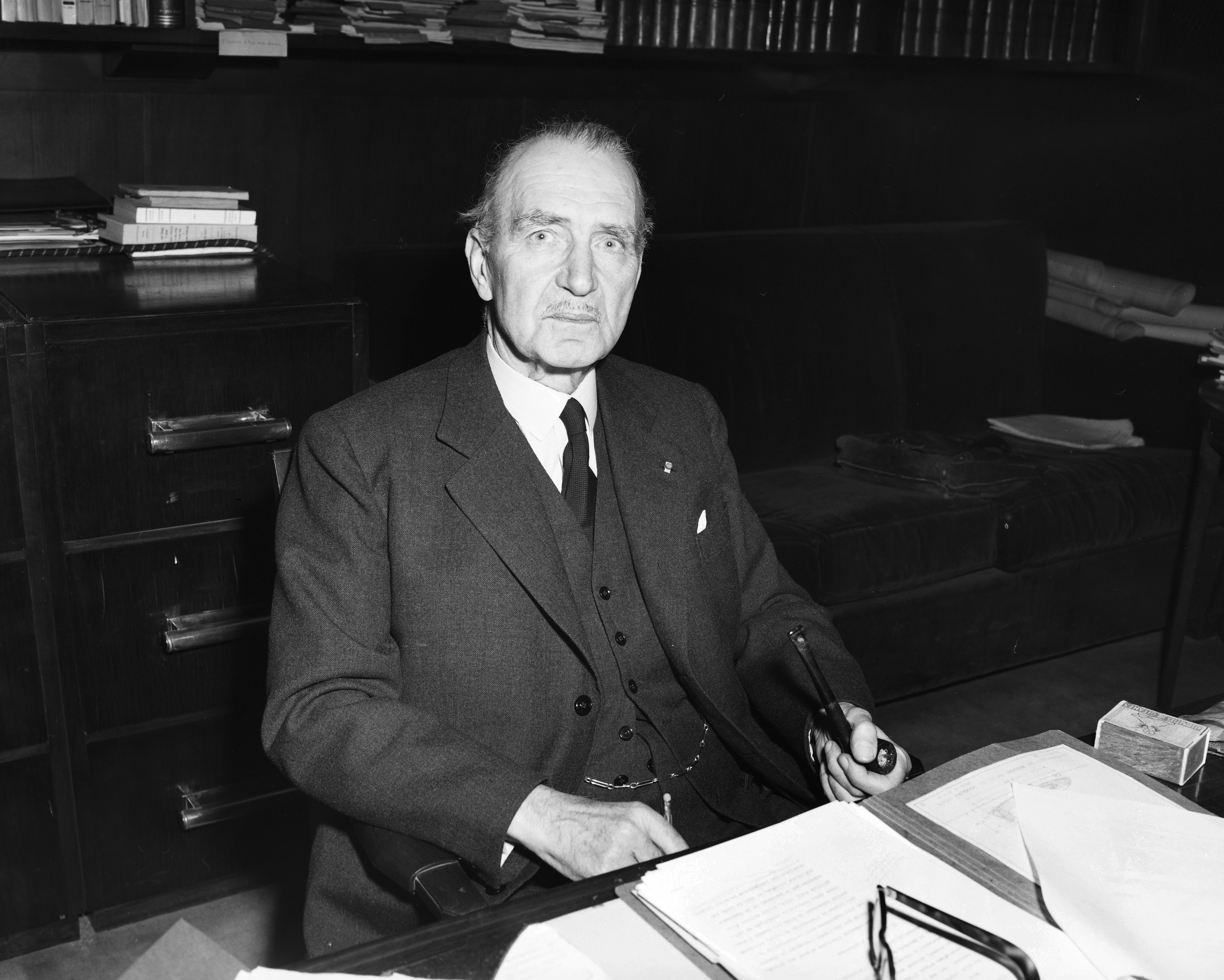
Louis Charles Breguet, 1952

Louis Charles Breguet (English: /brɛˈɡeɪ/, French: [lwi ʃaʁl bʁeɡɛ]; 2 January 1880 in Paris – 4 May 1955 in Saint-Germain-en-Laye) was a French aircraft designer and builder, one of the early aviation pioneers.

== Biography ==
Louis Charles Breguet was the grandson of Louis Clément François Breguet, and great-great-grandson of the famous horologist Abraham-Louis Breguet.

In 1902 Louis married Nelly Girardet, the daughter of painter Eugène Girardet. They had seven children together; five survived infancy.

In 1903, he graduated from École supérieure d'électricité, which was the top electrical engineering school in France.

In 1905, with his brother Jacques, and under the guidance of Charles Richet, he began work on a gyroplane (the forerunner of the helicopter) with flexible wings. On 29 September 1907, at his workshop at La Brayelle, it achieved the first ascent of a vertical-flight aircraft with a pilot, albeit only to a height of 0.6 metres (2.0 ft). It was also not a free flight, as four men were used to steady the structure.

He built his first fixed-wing aircraft, the Breguet Type I, in 1909, flying it successfully before crashing it at the Grande Semaine d'Aviation held at Reims. In 1911, he founded the Société anonyme des ateliers d’aviation Louis Breguet. In 1912, Breguet constructed his first hydroplane.

He is especially known for his development of reconnaissance aircraft used by the French in World War I and through the 1920s. One of the pioneers in the construction of metal aircraft, the Breguet 14 single-engined day bomber, perhaps one of the most widely used French warplanes of its time, had an airframe constructed almost entirely of aluminium structural members. As well as the French, sixteen squadrons of the American Expeditionary Force also used it. A plane of this type has a major role in the plot of the 1927 thriller So Disdained by Nevil Shute.

In 1919 he founded the Compagnie des messageries aériennes, which evolved into Air France.

Over the years, his aircraft set several records. A Breguet plane made the first nonstop crossing of the South Atlantic in 1927. Another made a 4,500-mile (7,200 km) flight across the Atlantic Ocean in 1933, the longest nonstop Atlantic flight up to that time.

He returned to his work on the gyroplane in 1935. Created with co-designer René Dorand, the craft, called the Gyroplane Laboratoire, flew by a combination of blade flapping and feathering. On 22 December 1935 it established a speed record of 67 mph (108 km/h). It was the first to demonstrate speed as well as good control characteristics. The next year, it set an altitude record of 517 feet (158 m).

Breguet remained an important manufacturer of aircraft during World War II and afterwards developed commercial transports. Breguet’s range equation, for determining aircraft range, is also named after him. He died of a heart attack in 1955 at Saint-Germain-en-Laye.

In 1980, Breguet was inducted into the International Air & Space Hall of Fame at the San Diego Air & Space Museum.

== Olympic sailing ==
Breguet, as helmsman of his 8-metre (26 ft) yacht Namousa, won a bronze medal in sailing during the 1924 Summer Olympics.

== See also ==
- Early Birds of Aviation

== Sources ==
- Dick, Ron; Dan Patterson (2003). "Great Names". Aviation Century: The Early Years. Erin, Ontario: Boston Mills. p. 208. ISBN 978-1-55046-407-8.
- Marcel Miocque; Huguette Vernochet; Alain Bertaud; Lise Dassonville-Agron (2001). Houlgate entre mer et campagne. Éditions Charles Corlet. p. 16. ISBN 978-2-85480-976-3.
