= De Dion-Bouton 78 hp =

1910s French piston aircraft engine

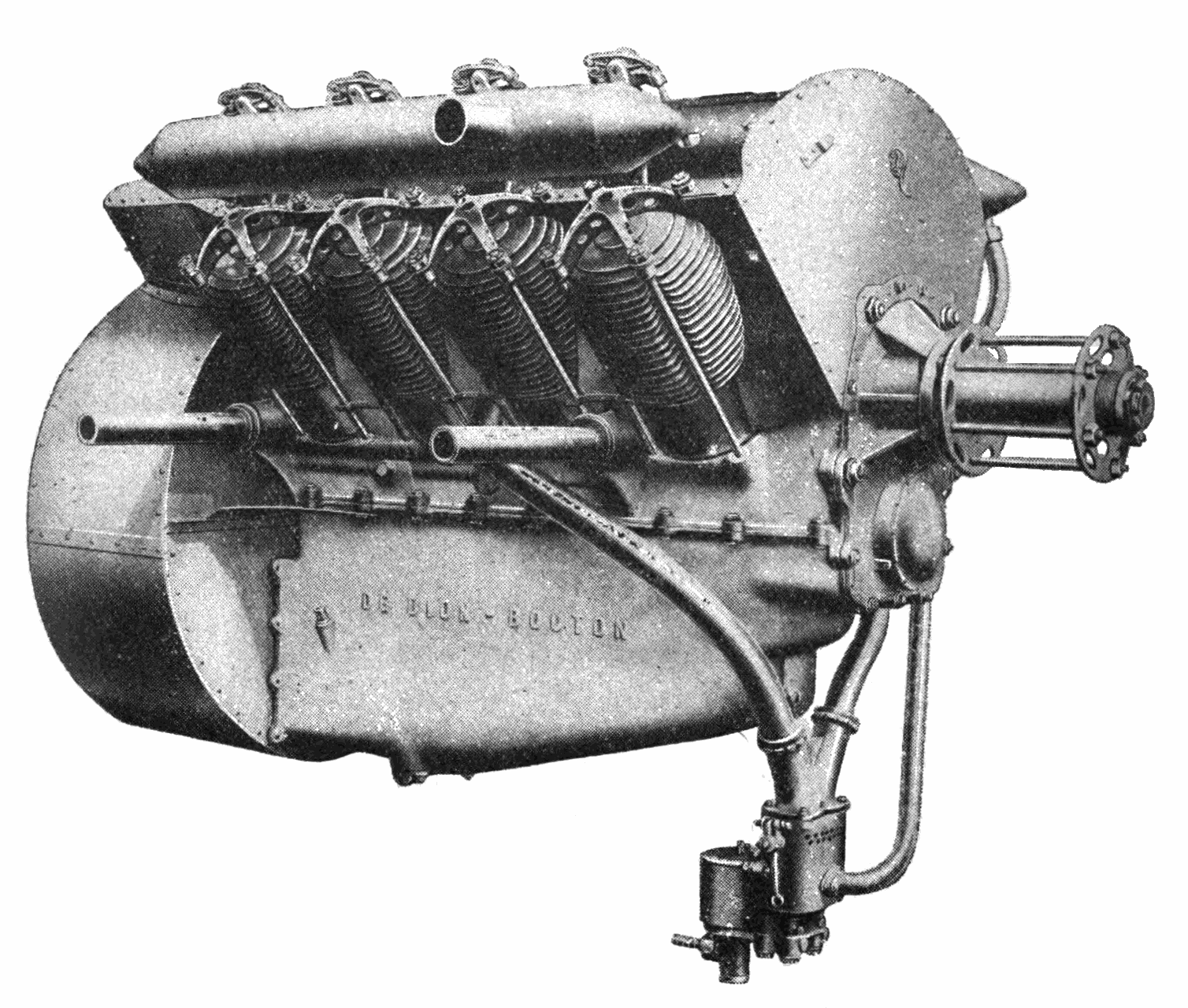
- De Dion-Bouton 78 hp V-8 aircraft engine (December 1913)
- Type: Piston inline aero engine
- National origin: France
- Manufacturer: De Dion-Bouton
- First run: c. 1912
- Major applications: Farman M.F.7bis, Farman M.F.11
- Developed into: De Dion-Bouton 130 hp

The De Dion-Bouton 78 hp, typically referred to as De Dion-Bouton 80 hp, was an eight-cylinder, air cooled vee aircraft engine that has been built by De Dion-Bouton.

== Design and development ==
=== Salon aéronautique de 1912 ===
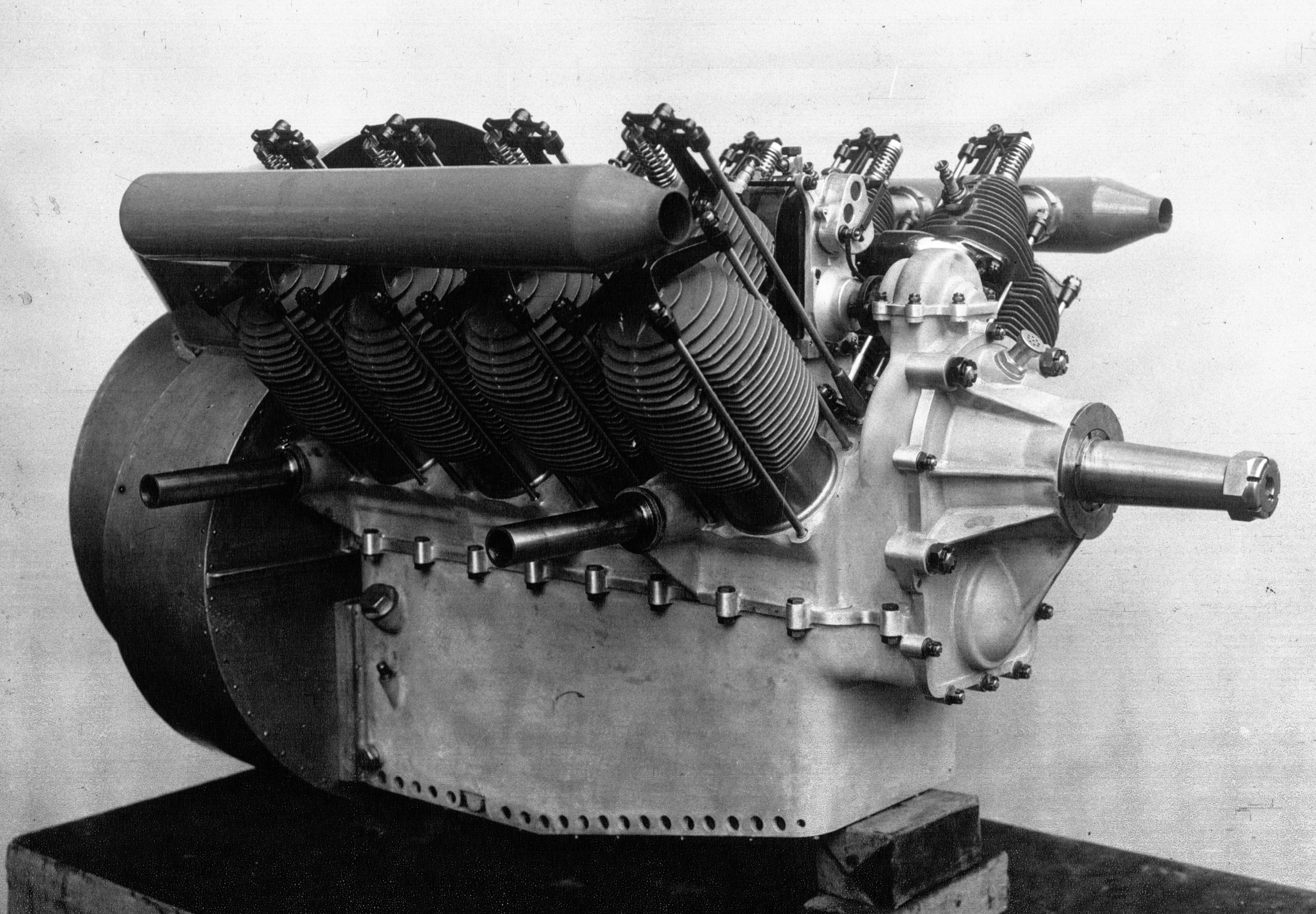
De Dion-Bouton 80 hp aircraft engine presented at the Salon aéronautique de 1912

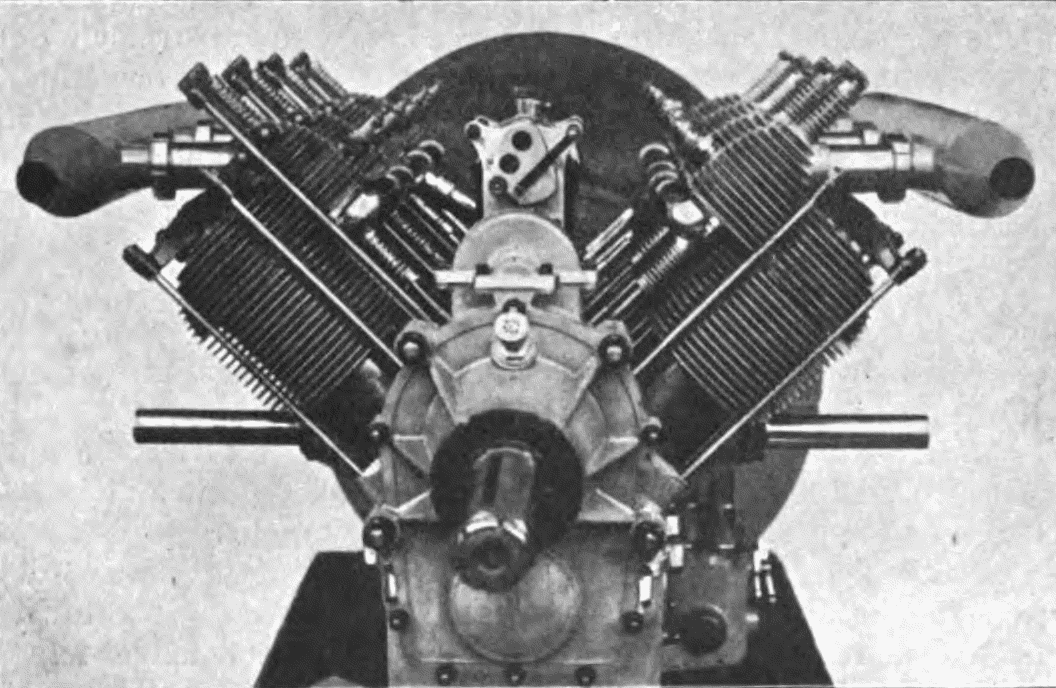
De Dion-Bouton 80 hp (Salon aéronautique de 1912), carburetor attached on crankcase (lower right).

The first version of the engine was presented on the 4th 'Exposition de la Locomotion Aérienne' (Salon aéronautique de 1912) from 26 October to 10 November 1912. It was an air-cooled eight cylinder Vee engine with two rows of four cylinders with a bore of 100 mm and a stroke of 120 mm. The engine was calculated for a power output of 80 hp and had a nominal power of 75 hp at 1700 rpm.

Generally it was noted that the engine had a striking resemblance to the air-cooled Renault V-8 engines of the time, while at the same time it has been accentuated that, contrary to the similar Renault engines, the propeller shaft, while mounted concentric to the camshaft, was actually driven independently by a reduction gear. Reportedly this was done to avoid patent conflicts, since the use of the camshaft as propeller shaft supposedly had already been patented. Actually though, in the final version of the engine at the end of 1913, the separate camshaft was attached to and driven by the propeller shaft in a similar way as in the Renault engines. Besides that, a notable difference to the Renault aviation engines was the use of forked connecting rods, as it was common design practice for the De Dion-Bouton automobile V-8 engines of the time, instead of the master-slave rod arrangements applied by Renault.

Ignition was provided by a Bosch magneto with a single spark plug per cylinder. A De Dion carburetor was fitted on one side of the crankcase. The intake air was routed through a separate chamber in the lower crankcase where it was preheated by the hot engine oil before it reached the carburetor.

=== Development in 1913 ===
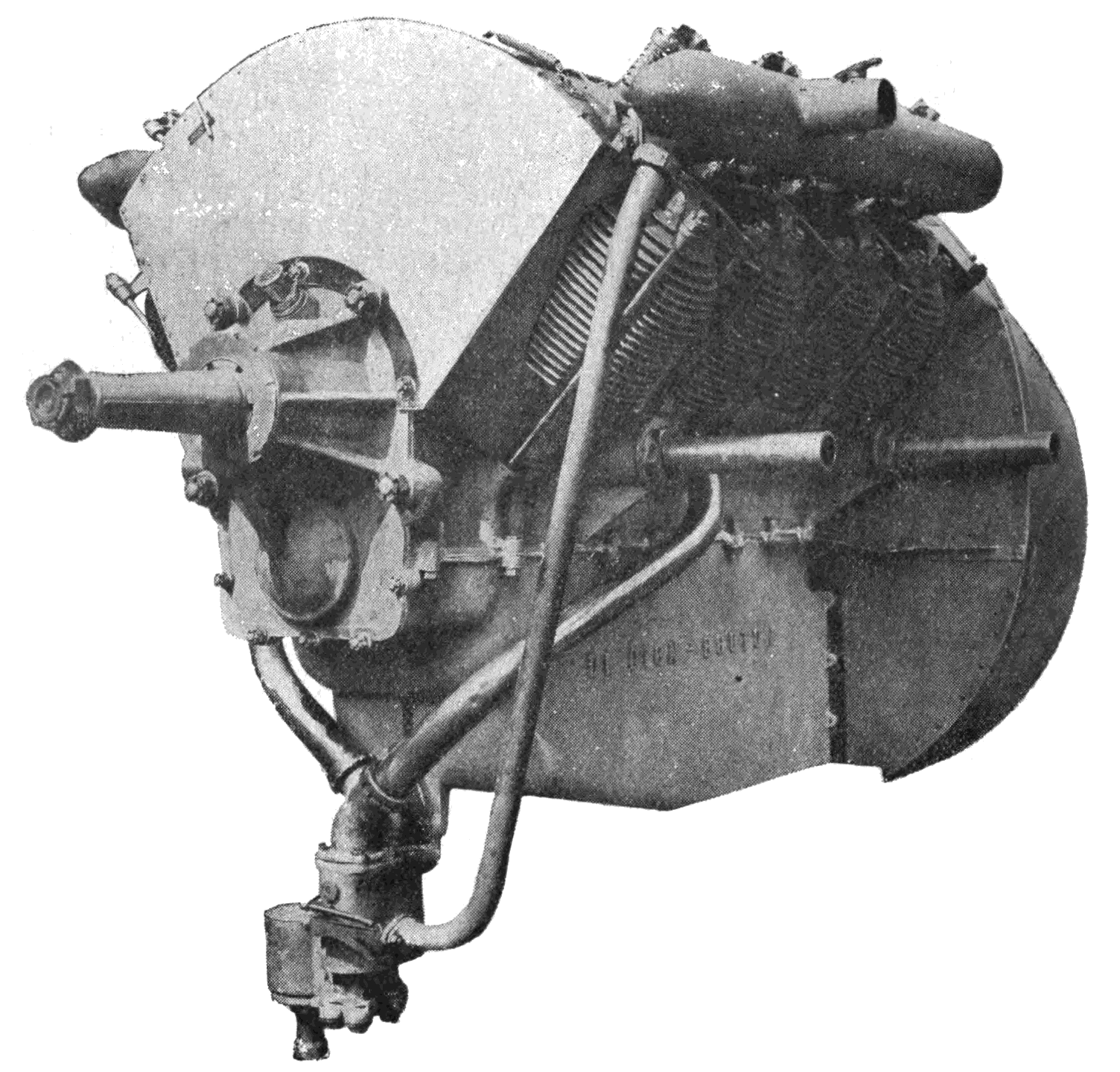
De Dion-Bouton 80 hp engine, ca. mid of 1913, showing redesigned engine case and exhaust manifolds

The engine has been improved throughout the year 1913 as photographs of the engine from mid 1913 show. A Zénith carburetor was placed at the propeller end of the engine, replacing the De Dion carburetor which had been mounted on the crankcase side previously. The exhaust manifolds were adapted, with exhaust gas being diverted via an additional pipe from one of the exhaust manifolds to the carburetor heating jacket. Consequently also the engine case was redesigned, with the preheated air intake for the De Dion carburetor being omitted.

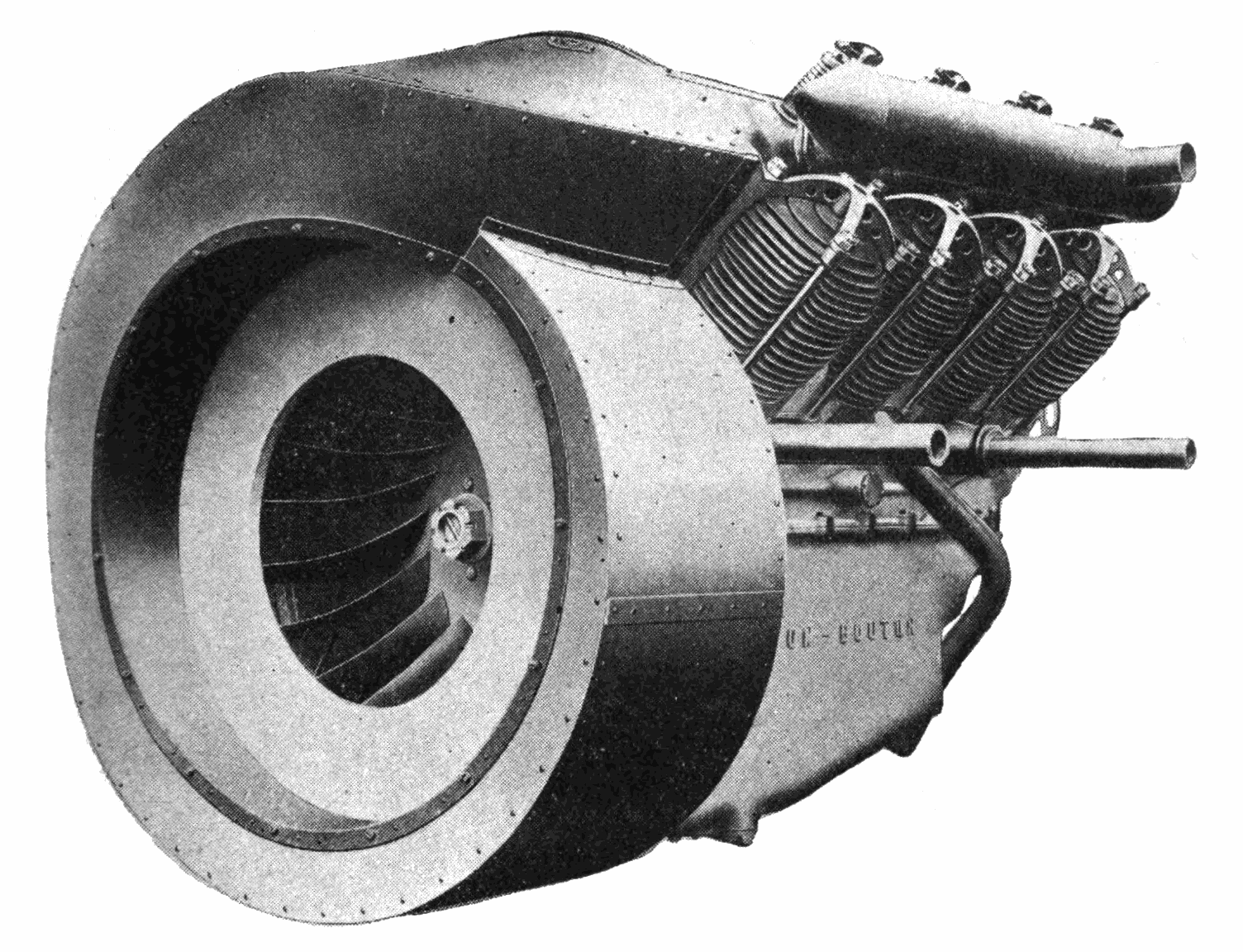
De Dion-Bouton 78 hp engine, view from the fan end

Later that year the improved De Dion-Bouton engine was exhibited at the 5th 'Exposition de la Locomotion Aérienne' from 5 to 25 December 1913. The engine was reported to have a bore of 106 mm and a stroke of 120 mm. and seems to have been the definitive version of the engine. It was also advertised in newspapers at that time. Photographs show further minor refinements of the engine, such as a slightly shortened propeller shaft bearing, a revised placement of the carburetor, and a refinement of the cross shaped clamps holding the cylinders, which now have a more arched form and are drilled through for further weight reduction.

Besides the aforementioned differences to the contemporary Renault V-8 air cooled aviation engines, the De Dion-Bouton 78 hp engine very closely resembled their design. It had eight cylinders arranged in two rows of four cylinders inclined at 90 degrees to each other. The propeller shaft was geared down from the crankshaft by spur gears and rotated at half the engine speed. The intake and exhaust valves were controlled by a single camshaft, which was placed between the two rows of cylinders. The camshaft was connected to the propeller shaft and therefore also rotated at half speed of the crankshaft.

The cylinders and cylinder heads were separate cast-iron pieces with cast fins for air-cooling. The cylinder head was tightened to the cylinder and then secured by a cross-shaped clamp which was bolted to the crankcase with four long studs. The inlet and exhaust valves sat vertically opposed in a lateral pocket of the cylinder head on the side of the combustion chamber, with the inlet valve situated below the exhaust valve. The inlet valve was operated directly from the camshaft via a tappet, whereas the exhaust valve was operated via a push rod and a rocker lever.

The cooling of the cylinders was done by air. A fan was mounted directly on the crankshaft on the end opposite to the propeller, which ensured the circulation of air around the cylinders by forcing the air into the enclosed space between the two cylinder rows. The air was then discharged through the gaps between the individual cylinders. The crankshaft was supported by three plain intermediate bearings and three outer ball bearings, with two of the ball bearings supporting the spur gear on the propeller end and one ball bearing supporting the fan end.

The lower part of the crankcase served as an oil reservoir. A pressurized oil lubrication system was fed by a gear pump located on the lowest point of the crankcase. The oil pump was driven over a vertical shaft from the camshaft via helical gears.

Ignition was provided by a single Bosch type magneto sitting on the reduction gearing between the two cylinder rows and a single spark plug per cylinder.

A dual barrel Zénith carburetor was fitted on the front of the engine case, with each barrel of the carburetor feeding one row of four cylinders.

== Operational history ==
The engine has been employed in the Farman M.F.7bis and Farman M.F.11 pusher aeroplanes of the French Army alongside the very similar Renault 80 hp V-8 engines. In French service, the De Dion-Bouton engine however does not seem to have received same approval of the technical staff, who frequently complained about weaknesses compared to the Renault in their reports.

Toward the end of 1915 some of the Farman M.F.7 in the Spanish military air service were re-engined with De Dion-Bouton 80 hp engines, and also Farman M.F.11 aeroplanes were refitted with the De Dion-Bouton 80 hp, as they were plagued with engine troubles with the originally installed Renault 70 hp engines.

== Applications ==
- Farman M.F.7bis (French Army Types 4 and 5)
- Farman M.F.11 (French Army Types 6, 9, 12, 14 and 16)

== Specifications (De Dion-Bouton 78 hp) ==
Data from Marani

=== General characteristics ===
- Type: 8-cylinder, 90-degree Vee, air-cooled in-line piston engine
- Bore: 106 mm (4.2 in)
- Stroke: 120 mm (4.7 in)
- Displacement: 8.47 L (517 cu in)
- Length: 1,324 mm (52.1 in)
- Width: 960 millimetres (38 in)
- Height: 940 millimetres (37 in)
- Dry weight: 213 kg (470 lb)

=== Components ===
- Fuel system: Zenith-Carburetor
- Reduction gear: 0.5:1

=== Performance ===
- Power output: 73 hp (54 kW) at 1,800 rpm
- Fuel consumption: 33.7 L (7.4 imp gal; 8.9 US gal)
- Oil consumption: 2.6 L (0.57 imp gal; 0.69 US gal)

== See also ==
Related development

- De Dion-Bouton 130 hp

Comparable engines

- Renault 70 hp
- Renault 80 hp

Related lists

- List of aircraft engines
