= Renault 90 hp =

World's first V12 aircraft engine

90 hp
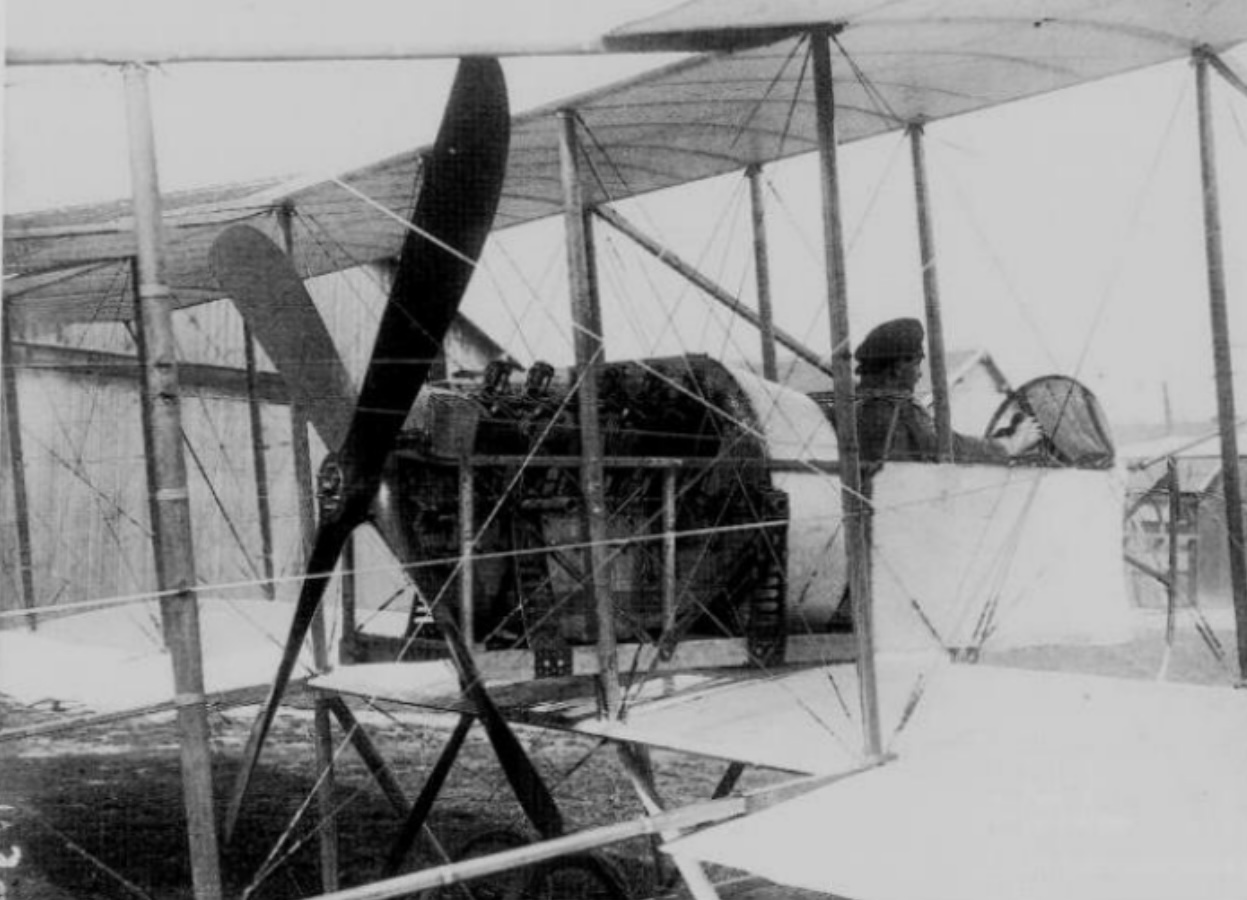
- Renault 90 hp fitted to a Maurice Farman biplane
- Type: Air-cooled V12 aero engine
- National origin: France
- Manufacturer: Renault
- First run: 1911
- Number built: 130
- Developed from: Renault 70 hp
- Developed into: Renault 100 hp

The Renault 90 hp, also known as the 12A (Note: The name "12A" does not appear in Renault’s contemporary publications but is used by later authors when classifying the engine.), was the world’s first V12 aircraft engine. Developed in 1911, it evolved from Renault’s earlier V8 models and retained the same air-cooled design.

The 90 hp model was also the first Renault engine to feature articulated master-and-slave connecting rods, allowing a pair of pistons to connect to a single bearing. As with other air-cooled Renault engines of the era, the propeller was mounted on an extension of the camshaft, which rotated at half the engine speed. This configuration enabled both the engine and the propeller to operate at their most efficient rotational speeds without the need for a dedicated reduction gearbox. Despite the incorporation of these design elements, the engine was relatively heavy for its power output.

The Renault 90 hp was first exhibited in December 1911 at the Paris Air Show and powered several aircraft during the 1912 competition season, though without any notable sporting successes. Renault followed up with a similarly designed, 100 hp model in the summer of 1912.

== Design and development ==
By 1911, V12 engines had been built for boats and automobiles, but Renault's was the first designed for aircraft use. As with other V12s and straight-six engines, Renault's V12 design had the inherent advantage of primary and secondary engine balance. The 60 degree angle between two rows of six cylinders resulted in even firing intervals for smooth power delivery and gave the engine a narrower profile than Renault's 90 degree V8s thereby reducing aerodynamic drag.

In addition to being the world's first V12 aero engine, the 90 hp model was the first Renault aero engine with articulated master-and-slave connecting rods allowing corresponding cylinders in each row to be arranged directly opposite each other which improved dynamic balance. This arrangement also made the engine crankcase shorter than would have been the case if the "side by side" connecting rods (found on the earlier V8 Renault 70 hp) had been used.

The ignition system used two magnetos, one for each bank of six cylinders. Each cylinder had a single spark plug, located in a small pocket on the side of the main combustion chamber along with the intake and exhaust valves. The exhaust valve was positioned at the top of the pocket, while the intake valve was located at the bottom.

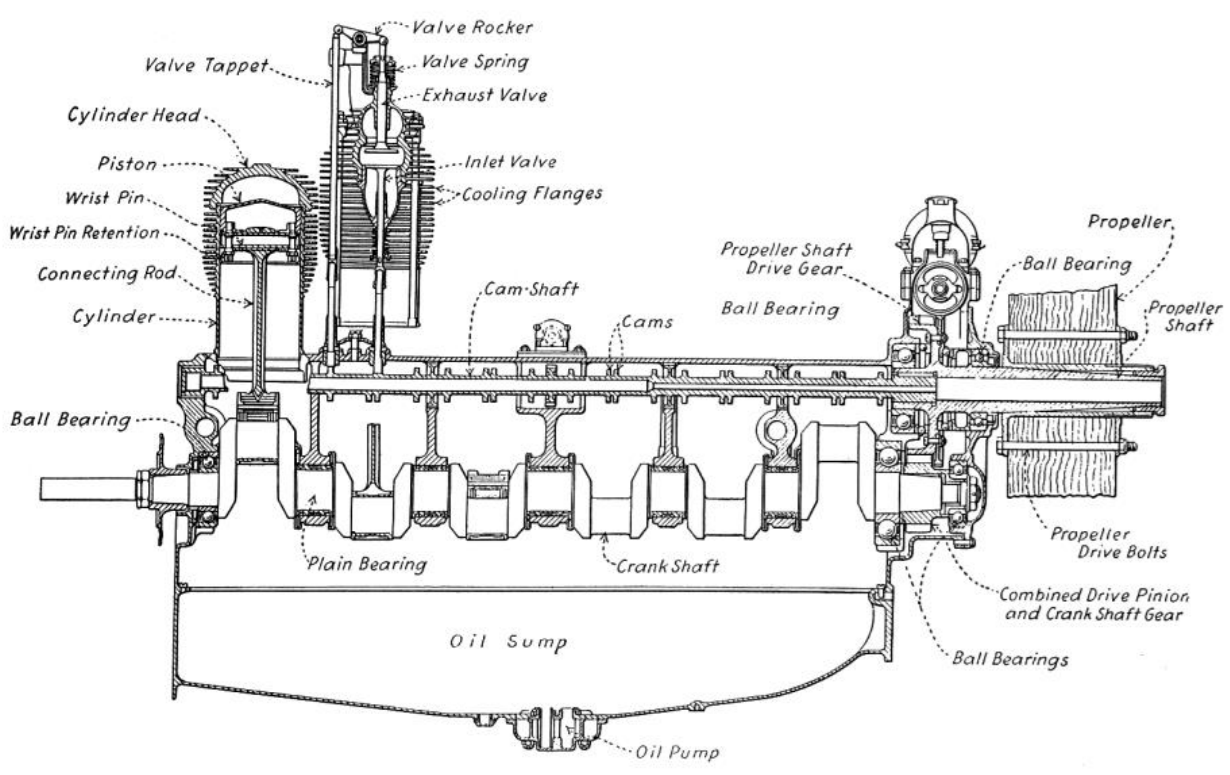
Side sectional view of the Renault 90 hp

Lubricating oil was circulated by a pump mounted at the bottom of the crankcase, which also served as a reservoir for the oil. Unlike some engines of the same period that used total-loss oiling systems, the Renault 90 hp engine continuously recirculated its lubricating oil, resulting in comparatively low consumption.

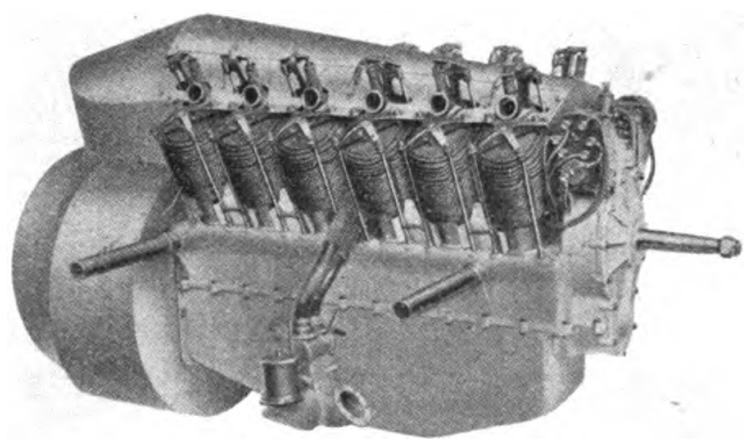
Renault 90 hp with rear mounted centrifugal fan

As with Renault's V8 air-cooled models, engines intended for pusher aircraft were fitted with a centrifugal blower while those engines intended for tractor aircraft used a cowl-mounted air scoop. Cooling air was fed over the large fins on each of the twelve cast iron cylinders. Pistons were made of steel with cast iron piston rings. Cylinder heads were separate castings attached to the aluminum-alloy crankcase with four long stud bolts which held each cylinder assembly in place.

Two steel tubes passed through the crankcase and extended outward on both sides, allowing them to serve as engine supports when mounting the engine into an aircraft fuselage.

A single float-type carburetor was mounted on the left side of the engine's crankcase. In cold conditions, warm air was supplied to the carburetor through air pipes positioned adjacent to and heated by the engine's exhaust pipes.

Another feature inherited from earlier Renault air-cooled V8 engines was the form of reduction gearing where the propeller was fixed to the end of the camshaft allowing it to turn at half engine speed. This method of gearing allowed the engine and propeller to be run close to their optimum speeds without the additional weight penalty of a gearbox while the reverse rotation of the crankshaft and propeller reduced gyroscopic forces improving aircraft handling.

== Operational history ==
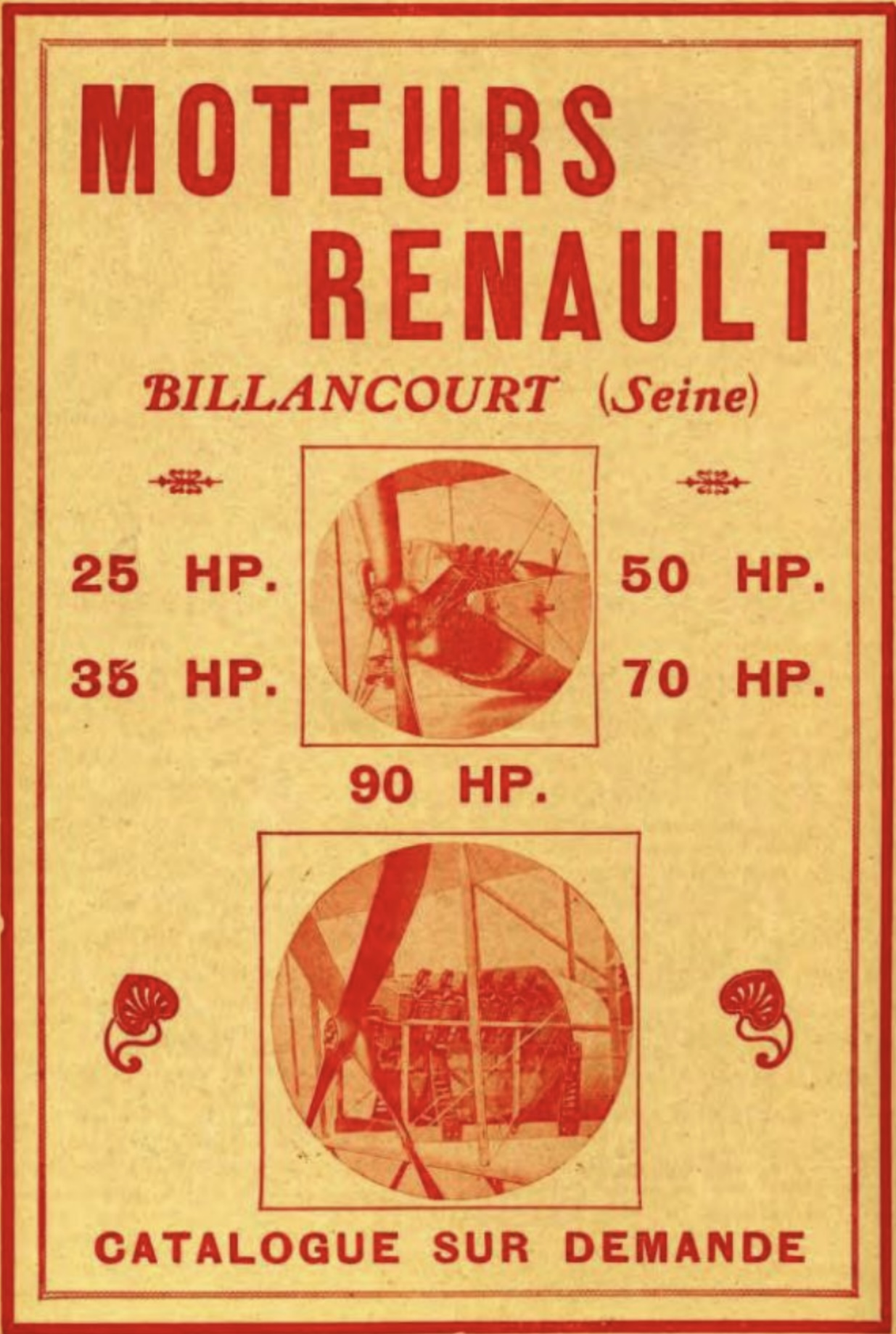
Renault aircraft engine advert c. 1912 showing the five available models

The Renault 90 hp was first exhibited during December 1911 at the Paris Air Show held in the Grand Palais. The engine was offered at a price of 17,000 francs (the 70 hp V8 model was priced at 12,500 francs). The Aeroplane magazine’s correspondent at the event noted that the engine was both large and complex. It also weighed two to three times as much as similarly powerful engines from other manufacturers.

Three Renault 90 hp-powered aircraft built by Astra, Farman, and Breguet entered the first-ever aviation grand prix organized by the Aéro-Club de France, held on the 16-17 June in Anjou. The Renault 90 hp was the heaviest engine in the competition. The weather conditions during the event were terrible, with heavy rain and gale-force winds. The only Renault 90 hp-powered aircraft to complete the course was a two-seater Astra-Wright biplane piloted by Louis Gaubert, who ranked fifth out of five finishers in a special race held on the final day of the event. (Note: The competition's rules favored the larger, heavier aircraft powered by the Renault 90 hp by granting a time bonus based on the number of passengers carried. However, weather conditions during the event were poor. Many entrants withdrew on safety grounds or were unable to take off as their aircraft got bogged down in the muddy ground. The overall winner of the Grand Prix was Roland Garros in a Blériot single-seater monoplane.)

Renault produced 130 examples of the 90 hp model. The 90 hp engine was quickly followed by a 100 hp (75 kW) model in the summer of 1912. Renault continued developing air-cooled V12 engines, with the design eventually reaching 138 hp (103 kW). During World War I, the company shifted its focus to water-cooled V12 engines, and by 1915, the air-cooled models were being built primarily for use in trainer aircraft.

== Applications ==
- Astra-Wright biplane
- Breguet Type IV
- Farman MF.7

== Specifications ==
Data from Angle and L'Aéro

=== General characteristics ===
- Type: Air–cooled, upright, 60-degree, V-12 piston engine
- Bore: 90 mm (3.54 in)
- Stroke: 140 mm (5.51 in)
- Displacement: 10.66 L (650.76 cu in)
- Length: 1,585 mm (62.40 in)
- Width: 803 mm (31.61 in)
- Height: 710 mm (27.95 in)
- Dry weight: 289.4 kg (638 lb)

=== Components ===
- Valvetrain: One exhaust valve and one inlet valve per cylinder. Both valves located in a lateral pocket with the exhaust on top and the intake on the bottom.
- Fuel system: Carburetor mounted on the left side of the engine block.
- Fuel type: Petrol
- Oil system: Wet sump. External oil pump mounted on the bottom of the sump.
- Cooling system: Air-cooled
- Reduction gear: 0.5:1, left hand tractor (there is no reduction gear as such; The reduction was achieved by mounting the propeller on the camshaft).
- Rotation (looking end on at the propeller hub): Engine crankshaft, 1800 rpm counter-clockwise. Camshaft and propeller, 900 rpm clockwise.

=== Performance ===
- Power output: 90 hp (67 kW) - Nominal
- Power-to-weight ratio: 0.232 kW/kg (0.141 hp/lb) at nominal power output

== See also ==
- List of aircraft engines
