= De Dion-Bouton 130 hp =

1910s French piston aircraft engine

De Dion-Bouton 12B 130 hp
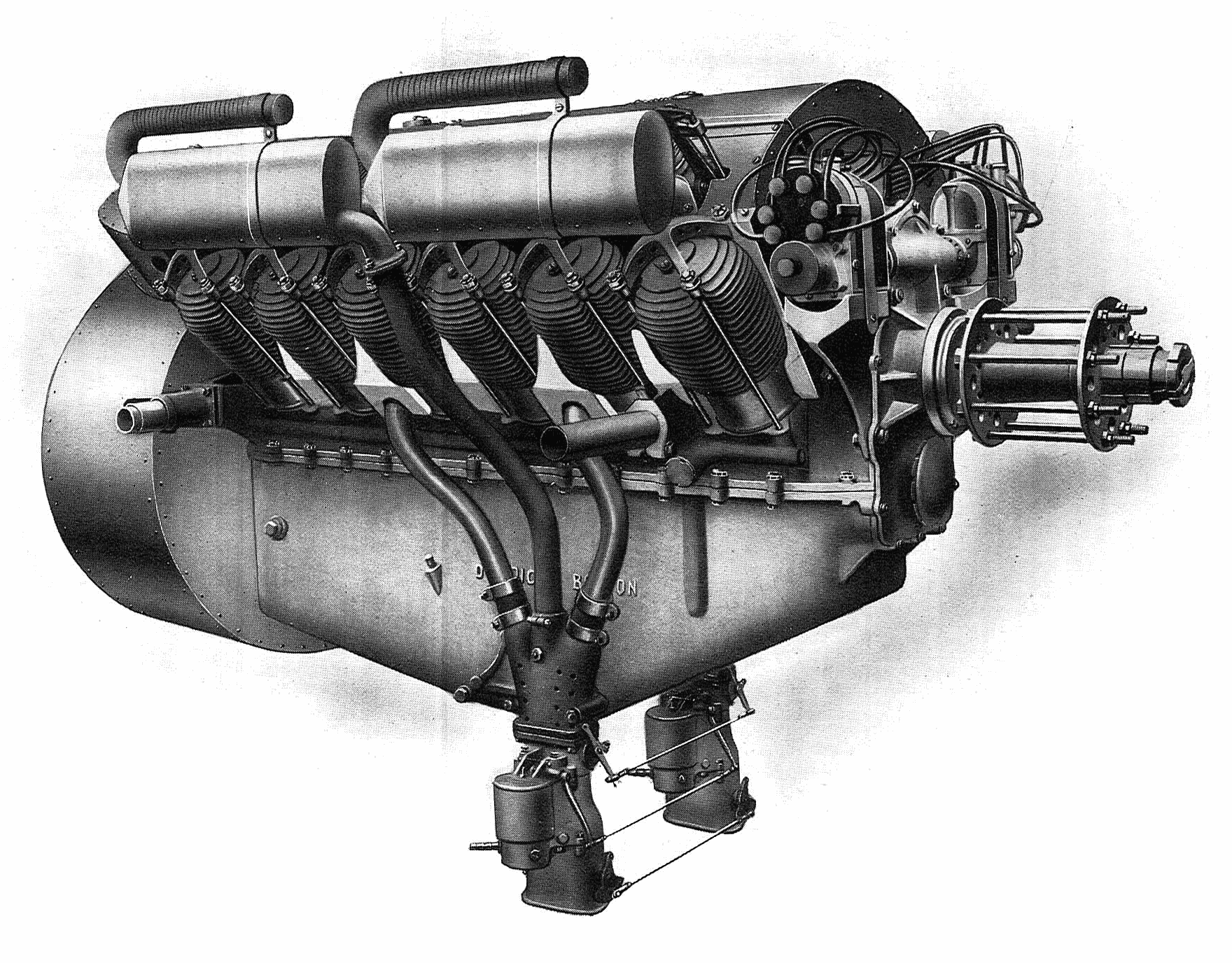
- De Dion-Bouton 12B 130 hp aircraft engine
- Type: Piston inline aero engine
- National origin: France
- Manufacturer: De Dion-Bouton
- First run: c.1914
- Major applications: Farman F.40, Farman M.F.11bis
- Developed from: De Dion-Bouton 78 hp

The De Dion-Bouton 130 hp aircraft engine, also referred to as De Dion-Bouton 12B, was a twelve-cylinder, air cooled vee aircraft engine that has been built by De Dion-Bouton.

== Design and development ==
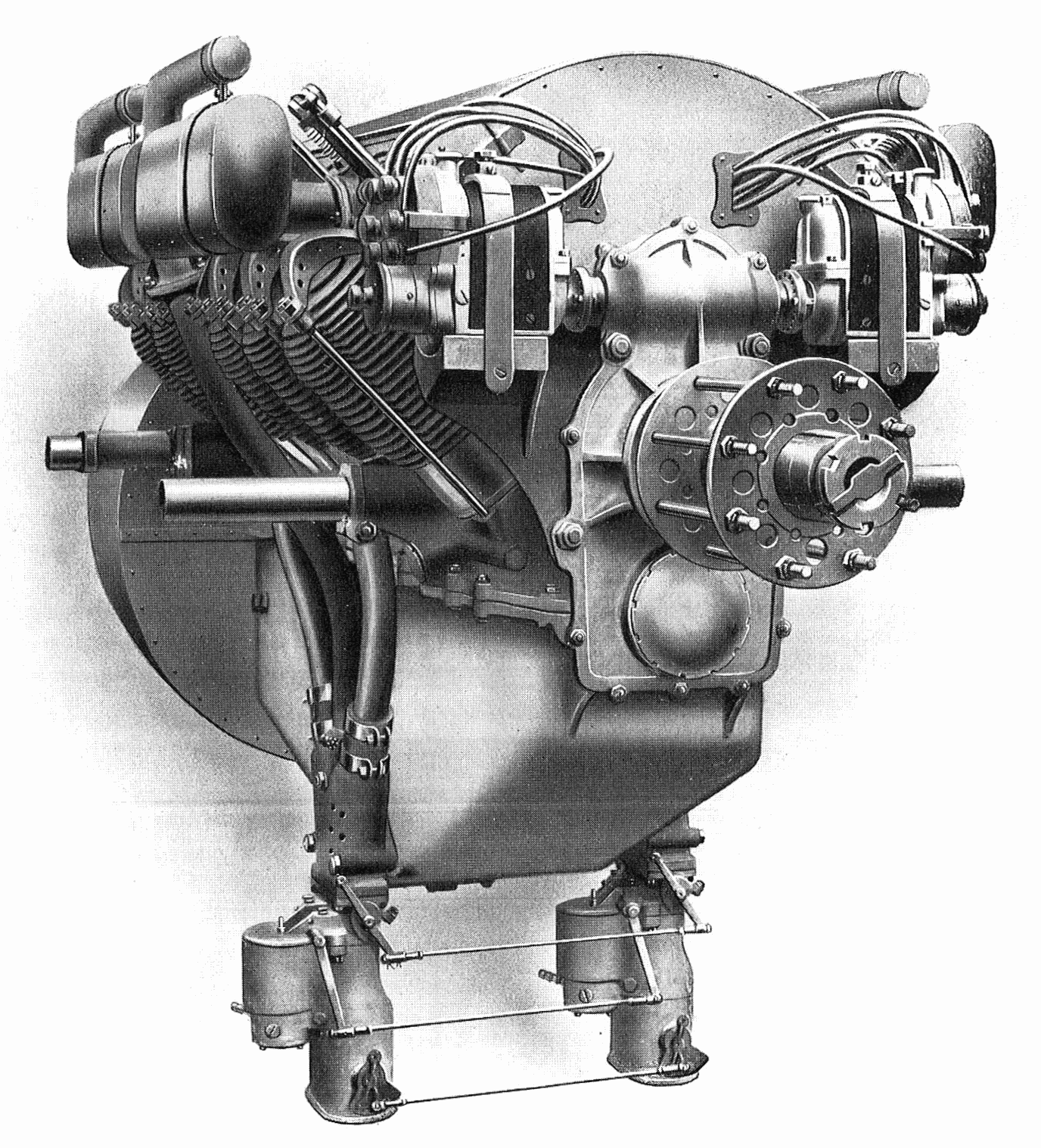
De Dion-Bouton 130 hp aircraft engine (propeller end)

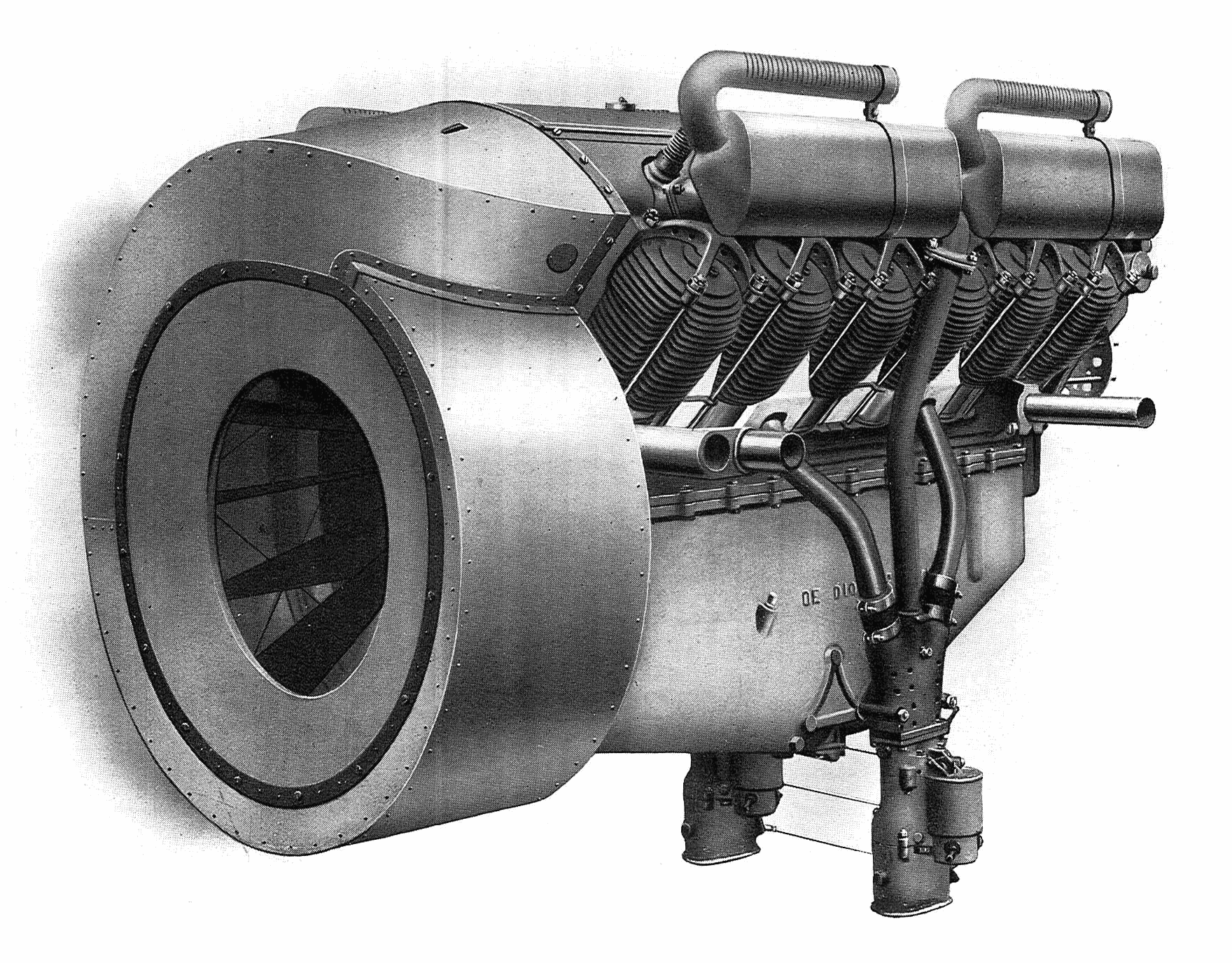
De Dion-Bouton 130 hp aircraft engine (fan end)

The De Dion-Bouton 12B 130 hp aircraft engine was an air-cooled twelve cylinder Vee engine with two rows of six cylinders, having a bore of 106 mm and a stroke of 126 mm. The two cylinder rows were inclined at 90 degrees to each other and consisted of separately cast cylinders.

The propeller shaft was geared down from the crankshaft by spur gears and rotated at half the engine speed. The intake and exhaust valves were controlled by a single camshaft, which was placed between the two rows of cylinders. The camshaft was connected to the propeller shaft and therefore also rotated at half speed of the crankshaft.

The cylinders and cylinder heads were separate cast-iron pieces with cast fins for air-cooling. The cylinder head was tightened to the cylinder and then secured by a cross-shaped clamp which was bolted to the crankcase with four long studs. The inlet and exhaust valves sat vertically opposed in a lateral pocket of the cylinder head on the side of the combustion chamber, with the inlet valve situated below the exhaust valve. The inlet valve was operated directly from the camshaft via a tappet, whereas the exhaust valve was operated via a push rod and a rocker lever.

The cooling of the cylinders was done by air. A fan was mounted directly on the crankshaft on the end opposite to the propeller, which ensured the circulation of air around the cylinders by forcing the air into the enclosed space between the two cylinder rows. The air was then discharged through the gaps between the individual cylinders.

The pistons were made from cast iron and had 3 piston rings. The connecting rods for one cylinder row connected to the crank pin via forked rods, while the rods from the other side were articulated in the space between their forked ends. The crankshaft was supported by five plain intermediate bearings and three outer ball bearings, with two of the ball bearings supporting the spur gear on the propeller end and one ball bearing supporting the fan end.

The lower part of the crankcase served as an oil reservoir. A pressurized oil lubrication system was fed by a gear pump located on the lowest point of the crankcase. The oil pump was driven over a vertical shaft from the camshaft via helical gears.

Ignition was provided by two Bosch type Z.U.6 magnetos and a single spark plug per cylinder. The magnetos were placed opposite to each other on both sides atop the reduction gearing, each driven by a separate transversal shaft via bevel gears.

Two dual barrel Zénith carburetors were fitted, one on each sides of the engine case, with each carburetor feeding one row of six cylinders.

== Applications ==
- Farman M.F.11bis (French Army Type 45)
- Farman F.40 (French Army Type 46)

== Specifications (De Dion-Bouton 12B 130 hp) ==
Data from

=== General characteristics ===
- Type: 12-cylinder, 90-degree Vee, air-cooled in-line piston engine
- Bore: 106 mm (4.2 in)
- Stroke: 126 mm (5.0 in)
- Displacement: 13.34 L (814 cu in)

=== Components ===
- Fuel system: Zenith-Carburetor
- Reduction gear: 0.5:1

=== Performance ===
- Power output: 130 hp (97 kW) at 1,850 rpm

== See also ==
Related development

- De Dion-Bouton 78 hp

Comparable engines

- Renault 130 hp V-12

Related lists

- List of aircraft engines
