= Royal Aircraft Factory B.E.10 =

General information
- Type: Multi-role aircraft
- National origin: British
- Manufacturer: Royal Aircraft Factory
- Status: cancelled
- Number built: 0

History
- Developed from: Royal Aircraft Factory B.E.2

The Royal Aircraft Factory B.E.10 was an aircraft based on the B.E.2c, designed in May 1914. The aircraft was intended to be built with a fabric-covered steel-tube fuselage with pressed alloy sheet ribs, and full-length ailerons. Its wingspan was slightly less than that of the B.E.2c, while it also had a deeper coaming and utilized an oleo undercarriage with a small "buffer" nosewheel. As well, the aerofoil had a reflex trailing edge. Although 4 units were ordered from the Bristol Aeroplane Company, they were never completed before the order was cancelled.

== Specifications ==
Data from The Royal Aircraft Factory

General characteristics

- Crew: 2
- Length: 27 ft 1 in (8.26 m)
- Wingspan: 35 ft 8 in (10.87 m)
- Height: 10 ft 9 in (3.28 m)
- Wing area: 355 sq ft (33.0 m^{2})
- Powerplant: 1 × Renault WB V-8 air-cooled piston engine, 70 hp (52 kW)
