= Renault 130 hp V-12 =

1910s French piston aircraft engine

Renault 130 hp
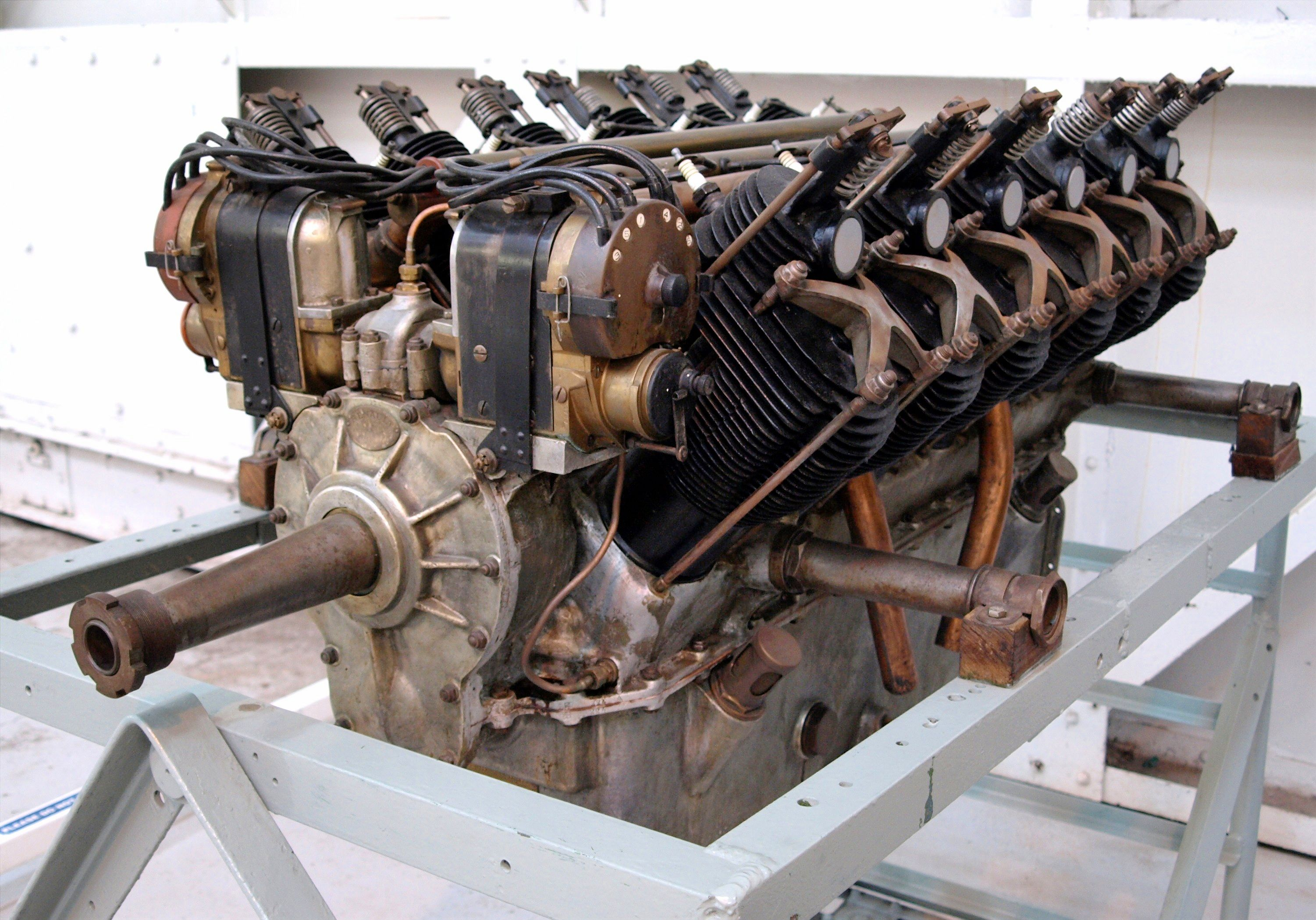
- Renault 130 hp at the Royal Air Force Museum, Cosford
- Type: Piston inline aero engine
- National origin: France
- Manufacturer: Renault
- Major applications: Caudron R.4, Farman MF.11bis, Farman F.40
- Developed from: Renault 100hp V-12

The Renault 130 hp V-12 aircraft engine is a twelve-cylinder, air cooled 90° vee engine built by the French Renault company.

== Design and development ==
The Renault 130 hp V-12 engine was a development from the earlier 100 hp V-12. The main changes in design included an increased angle between the two rows of six cylinders, now being placed at an 90° angle instead of 60° at the previous V-12. Another change was the increase of the displacement, with cylinder dimensions of 105 mm bore and 130 mm stroke. The engine was similar in construction to the Renault 80 hp V-8 engine, also having the same bore and stroke.

The cylinders and cylinder heads were separate cast-iron pieces with cast fins for air-cooling. The cylinder head was tightened to the cylinder with a copper-asbestos washer, and then secured by a cross-shaped clamp which was bolted to the crankcase with four long studs. Airflow for cooling the cylinders was generated with a fan driven from the rear end of the crankshaft. The fan was blowing air into the sheet metal enclosed chamber between the two rows of cylinders, which then left the enclosure through the narrow spaces between the cylinders, passing through the cylinder's cooling-fins.

A single camshaft was situated between the two rows of cylinders and operates the inlet and exhaust valves of both cylinder rows, with each valve operated by a separate cam on the camshaft. The inlet and exhaust valves sat vertically opposed in a lateral pocket of the cylinder head on the side of the combustion chamber, with the inlet valve situated below the exhaust valve. The inlet valve was operated directly from the camshaft via a tappet, whereas the exhaust valve was operated via a push rod and a rocker lever. The propeller was mounted directly on the camshaft, which was driven from the crankshaft via reduction gearing consisting of spur gears.

The lower part of the crankcase served as an oil reservoir. A pressurized oil lubrication system was fed by a gear pump located on the lowest point of the crankcase. The oil pump was driven over a vertical shaft from the camshaft via helical gears.

The pistons, fitted with three cast iron rings, were made of steel and were connected to the crankshaft via master-and-slave connecting rods. The crankshaft had six throws and was supported by five plain intermediate bearings and two outer ball bearings.

Two Zénith 42 DC dual carburetors were fitted on the engine, one on each side of the crankcase, with each dual carburetor feeding one cylinder row.

Ignition was supplied by two magnetos, with each magneto separately serving one cylinder row. The two magnetos were mounted transversely on the top of camshaft on the propeller end. The drive shafts of the magnetos were joined together and driven from the camshaft via helical gears. Three types of magnetos were used, ranging from Bosch Z.U.6 and S.E.V. C.6 magnetos to Lavallette magnetos.

== Applications ==
- Caudron R.4
- Farman MF.11bis
- Farman F.40
- Farman F.1,40

== Preserved engines ==
- One 130 hp Renault 12Db engine is preserved at the Brussels Air Museum.
- One 130 hp Renault 12Dc engine has been on display at the Royal Air Force Museum in Cosford.

== Specifications (Renault 130 hp) ==
Data from Angle

=== General characteristics ===
- Type: 12-cylinder, 90-degree Vee, air-cooled in-line piston engine
- Bore: 105 mm (4.134 in)
- Stroke: 130 mm (5.118 in)
- Dry weight: 350 kg (772 lb)

=== Components ===
- Cooling system: Air-cooled
- Reduction gear: 0.5:1

=== Performance ===
- Power output: 138 hp (103 kW) at 1,800 rpm
- Compression ratio: 4

== See also ==
Related development

- Renault 80 hp

Related lists

- List of aircraft engines
