= Bristol B.R.7 =

B.R.7
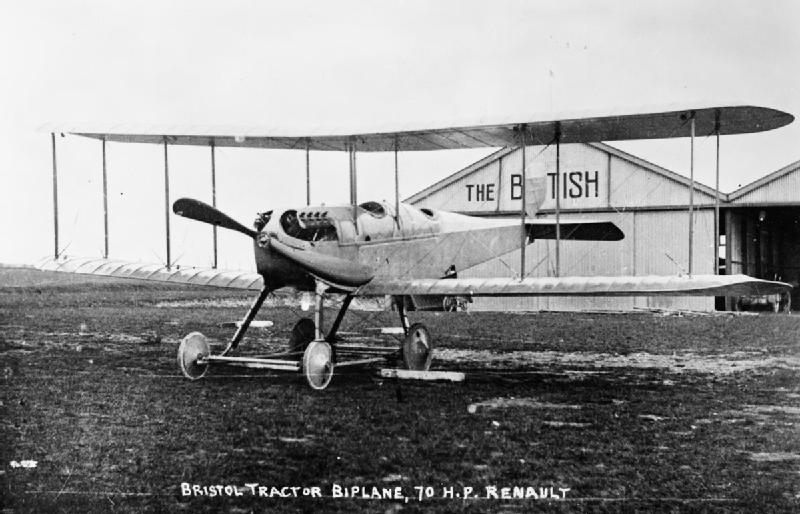

General information
- Type: two-seat military
- National origin: United Kingdom
- Manufacturer: The British and Colonial Aeroplane co. Ltd.
- Designer: Henri Coandă
- Number built: 8 (including one German-built machine)

History
- First flight: March 1913

The Bristol B.R.7 was a Romanian-designed single-engine two-seat biplane built by Bristol to a Spanish government order in 1913. It failed to meet its specifications and the order was cancelled.

== Development ==
The Romanian aircraft designer Henri Coandă was appointed head designer at the Bristol Aeroplane Company in January 1912. He began by building the series of Bristol-Coanda Monoplanes, but when the structural failure of one of these led to a War Office ban on the use of monoplanes by the RFC, Coandă turned to biplane designs. His first such effort, a two-seat single-engine machine, attracted the interest of both the Spanish and German governments.

The Spanish requested the use of the 70 hp (50 kW) Renault engine which they already used in their Maurice Farmans. The German version was to be built by Deutsche Bristol-Werke using a 90 hp (70 kW) Daimler engine, so Coandă had to prepare a design suitable for both powerplants. The Renault-engined version become known as the B.R.7; the German design seems not to have had a distinct label. The first of five B.R.7s ordered for Spain appeared at the Olympia Aero Show in February 1913, flying for the first time in March at Larkhill. Its wings were of two-bay form with no stagger. There were two tandem cockpits, one under the wing and the other, for the pilot behind the trailing edge. Behind the cockpits, the fuselage was quite slender, carrying a nearly semi-circular tailplane with a one-piece elevator and a finless balanced rudder. The undercarriage had the unusual four-wheel form used by the monoplane, with a pair of large wheels mounted below the wing trailing edge and aft of the centre of gravity, together with a slightly smaller pair forward of the engine; the B.R.7 sat on the ground like a tricycle undercarriage aircraft.

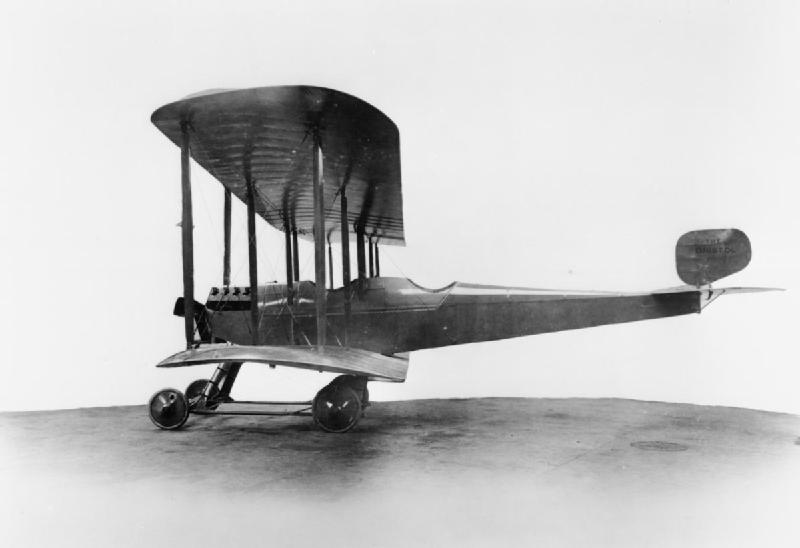

Early tests showed the wings of the B.R.7 produced too little lift because they used the lower camber associated with monoplanes. The wings were replaced with a set with greater camber, which improved performance but not by enough to meet the specification. Experiments with a four-bladed propeller also failed to produce sufficient improvement and the Spanish contract was cancelled. The second machine was lost to fire and the remaining four of the Spanish order flew rarely. A final, seventh B.R.7 was fitted with larger-span wings, but the only example to do much flying was the first prototype, which remained in service at Larkhill as an advanced trainer.

The German-built Daimler-engined machine had wings of much-increased span (from 38 ft/11.58 m to 57 ft/17.37 m) on the upper plane and a consequent increase in wing area of 30%. It also had a larger rudder and ailerons. It flew in July 1913.

== Specifications ==
Data from Barnes 1964, p. 84

General characteristics

- Crew: 2
- Length: 27 ft 5 in (8.36 m)
- Wingspan: 38 ft 0 in (11.58 m)
- Wing area: 440 sq ft (20.9 m^{2})
- Empty weight: 946 lb (429 kg)
- Gross weight: 1,826 lb (828 kg)
- Powerplant: 1 × Renault 70 hp , 70 hp (52 kW)

Performance

- Maximum speed: 63 mph (101 km/h, 55 kn)
- Endurance: 5 hours
