= Savary Hydroaéroplane =

1910s French aircraft

Hydroaéroplane Savary

General information
- Type: Floatplane
- National origin: France
- Designer: Robert Savary
- Number built: 1

History
- Introduction date: 1912

The Hydroaéroplane Savary was a French floatplane built in the early 1910s.

== Specifications ==
Data from

General characteristics

- Crew: 2
- Length: 10.00 m (32 ft 10 in)
- Wingspan: 14.50 m (47 ft 7 in)
- Wing area: 55.00 m^{2} (592.0 sq ft)
- Powerplant: 1 × Renault 75 hp V8 air-cooled piston engine
- Propellers: 2-bladed fixed-pitch propellers x 2

Performance

- Maximum speed: 110 km/h (68 mph, 59 kn)

== Bibliography ==
- Kurc, Alain (March 2000). "Robert Savary, un constructeur français de province" [Robert Savary, a French Provincial Builder]. Avions: Toute l'Aéronautique et son histoire (in French) (84): 42–49. ISSN 1243-8650.
- Kurc, Alain (April 2000). "Robert Savary, un constructeur français de province". Avions: Toute l'Aéronautique et son histoire (in French) (84): 51–58. ISSN 1243-8650.
- Opdycke, Leonard E. (1999). French Aeroplanes before the Great War. Atglen, Pennsylvania: Schiffer Publishing. p. 233. ISBN 0-7643-0752-5.
