= Farman F.40 =

French WW1 reconnaissance aircraft

F.40
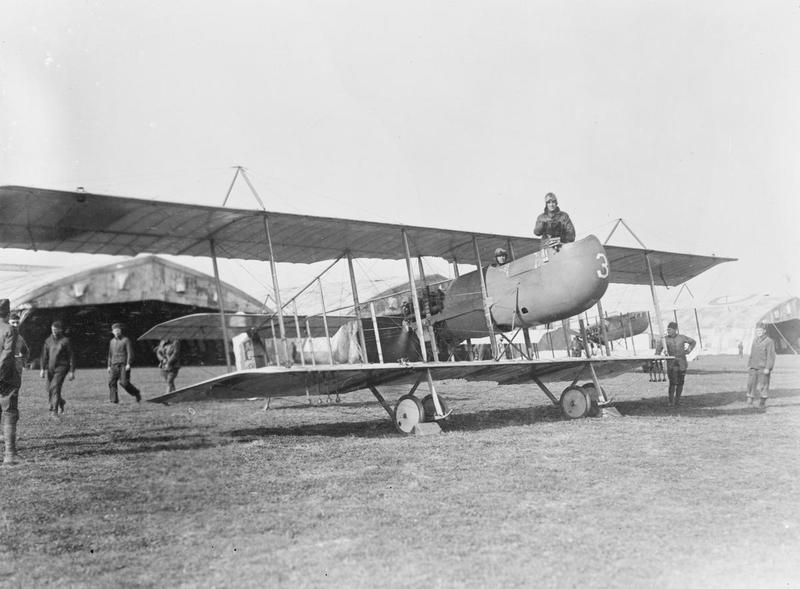
- A Farman F.40 in American service during World War I

General information
- Type: reconnaissance/observation biplane
- Manufacturer: Farman Aviation Works
- Designer: Henry Farman

History
- Introduction date: 1915
- Retired: 1922

The Farman F.40 was a French pusher biplane reconnaissance aircraft. The aircraft was also used as light bomber aircraft in the early part of World War I and later it was used as a trainer.

== Development ==
Developed from a mix of the Maurice Farman-designed MF.11 and the Henry Farman-designed HF.22, the F.40 (popularly called the Horace Farman) had an overall smoother crew nacelle. An open tail boom truss supported a horizontal tailplane and a curved fin. The aircraft went into production in 1915.

== Operational history ==
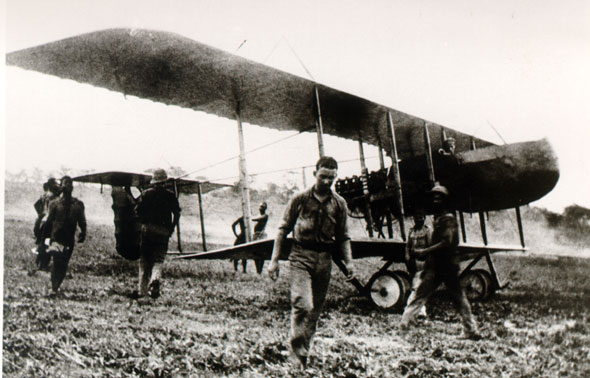
Portuguese Farman F.40 in Mozambique

Forty French Air Force escadrilles (squadrons) were equipped with F.40s. They operated for just over a year, but were replaced in early 1917.

The F.40 was also operated by the No. 5 Wing of the Royal Naval Air Service, Belgian forces in France, and also by the Russians. The Portuguese Forces in Mozambique included a small squadron of F.40, which participated in the East African Campaign.

A number of 120 Farman F.40s were purchased by Romania. These included the Type 42 and Type 60 variants of which 57 equipped with 130 hp (97 kW) De Dion engines, 46 with 130 hp (97 kW) Renault engines, and 17 with 160 hp (120 kW) Renault engines. The Farmans were assigned to squadrons of Grupul 1, Grupul 2 and Grupul 3 and were used until 1920. A Farman F.40 was also used to deliver some important documents for the Union with Transylvania to the Romanian National Council in 1918.

Italian aircraft maker Savoia-Marchetti built F.40s for use by the police force until 1922.

== Variants ==
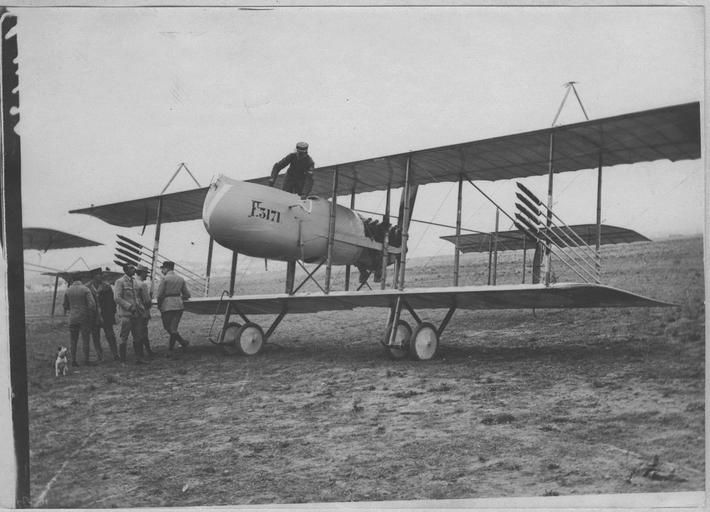
F.40 with Le Prieur rockets

Data from:French aircraft of the First World War

F.40
2-seat reconnaissance aircraft with 130 hp (97 kW) Renault 130 hp, 17.59 m (57.7 ft) span.
F.40
2-seat reconnaissance aircraft with 130 hp (97 kW) De Dion-Bouton 12B, 17.59 m (57.7 ft) span.
F.40H
2-seat seaplane trainer with 130 hp (97 kW) Renault 130 hp, 17.67 m (58.0 ft) span.
F.40bis
2-seat reconnaissance aircraft with 160 hp (120 kW) Renault 8Gc, 17.59 m (57.7 ft) span.
F.40ter
2-seat reconnaissance aircraft with 150 hp (110 kW) Lorraine 8A, 17.59 m (57.7 ft) span.
F.40 QC
2-seat reconnaissance aircraft with 130 hp (97 kW) Renault 130 hp, 17.59 m (57.7 ft) span and elongated tail.
F.40P
adaption to fire Le Prieur rockets
F.41
2-seat reconnaissance aircraft with 80 hp (60 kW) Renault 8B, 16.32 m (53.5 ft) span.
F.41 H
2-seat seaplane with 80 hp (60 kW) Renault 8B, 16.32 m (53.5 ft) span.
F.41bis
2-seat reconnaissance aircraft with 110 hp (82 kW) Lorraine 6AM, 16.32 m (53.5 ft) span.
F.41bis H
2-seat seaplane with 110 hp (82 kW) Lorraine 6AM, 16.32 m (53.5 ft) span.
F.1,40
2-seat trainer powered by an 80 hp (60 kW) Renault 8B, 17.67 m (58.0 ft) span.
F.1,40bis
2-seat floatplane trainer powered by a 110 hp (82 kW) Lorraine 6AM, 17.67 m (58.0 ft) span.
F.1,40bis
2-seat trainer powered by a 160 hp (120 kW) Renault 8C, 17.67 m (58.0 ft) span.
F.1,40
2/3-seat trainer powered by a 130 hp (97 kW) Renault 130 hp, 17.67 m (58.0 ft) span.
F.1,40ter
2-seat trainer powered by a 160 hp (120 kW) Lorraine 8Aby, 17.67 m (58.0 ft) span.
F.1,41
2-seat trainer powered by an 80 hp (60 kW) Renault 8B, 16.39 m (53.8 ft) span.
F.1,41 H
2-seat floatplane trainer powered by an 80 hp (60 kW) Renault 8B, 16.39 m (53.8 ft) span.
F.1,46
2-seat dual-control trainer powered by an 80 hp (60 kW) Renault 8B, 17.67 m (58.0 ft) span.
F.2,41
2-seat trainer powered by a 275 hp (205 kW) Lorraine 8Bd, 17.67 m (58.0 ft) span.

=== Army type numbers ===
The French Army applied type numbers to aircraft types in service. Initially these were used in a similar fashion to individual serial numbers, later used to denote similar aircraft types.

Army Type 42
F.40
Army Type 43
F.40
Army Type 44
F.41bis with 110 hp (82 kW) Lorraine 6AM engine.
Army Type 51
F.41.
Army Type 51 E2
F.1,41 with wings of altered camber.
Army Type 56
F.40bis.
Army Type 57
F.40ter.
Army Type 60
F.1,40bis.
Army Type 61
F.1,40ter.

== Operators ==
=== Military operators ===
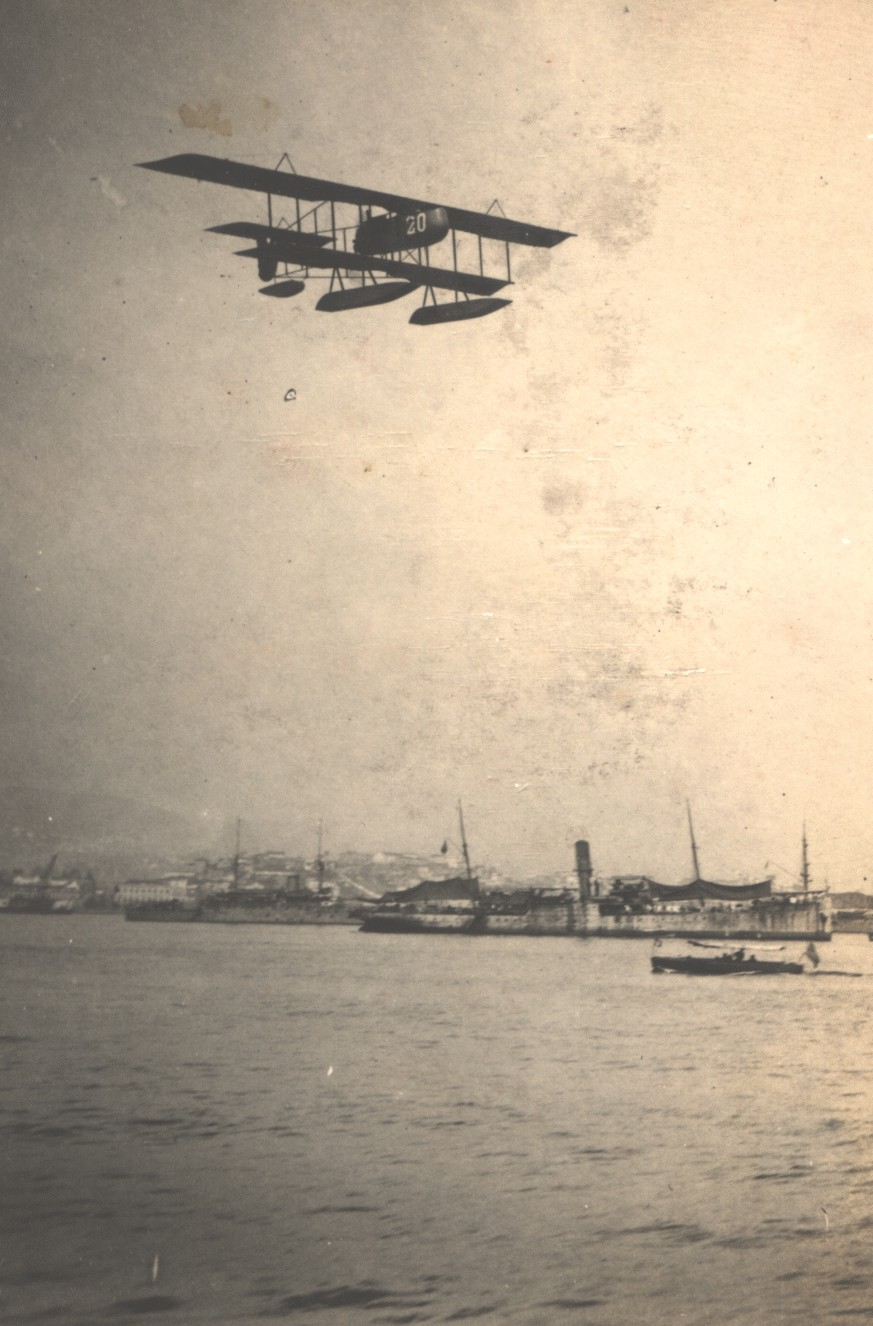
F.41 seaplane of the Brazilian Navy

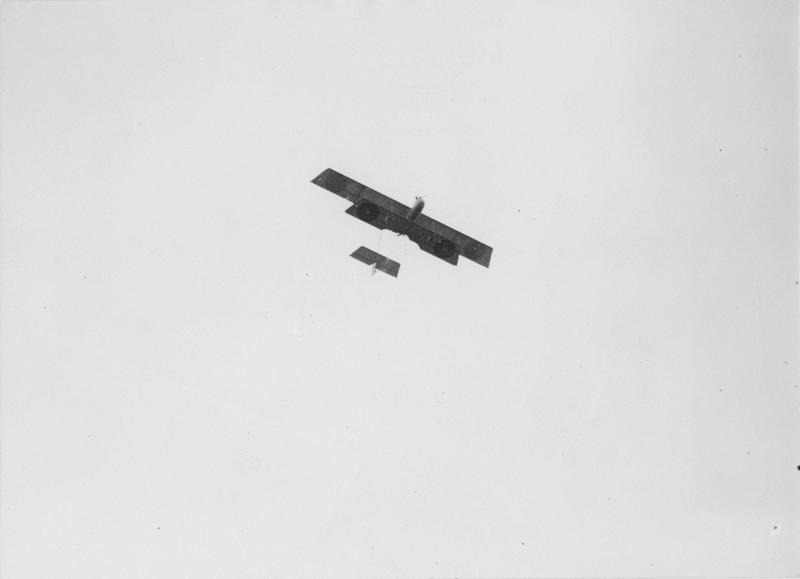
Romanian Farman F.40 in flight

Belgium

- Belgian Air Force

Brazil

- Brazilian Naval Aviation

France

- Armée de l'Air

Greece

- Hellenic Air Force

Kingdom of Italy

- Corpo Aeronautico Militare

Netherlands

- Royal Netherlands Aviation Department One aircraft only.

Norway

- Norwegian Army Air Service

Portugal

- Portuguese Air Force

Romania

- Romanian Air Corps

Russia

- Imperial Russian Air Force

Serbia

- Serbian Air Force

Soviet Union

- Soviet Air Force - Taken over for the Russian Air Force.

United Kingdom

- Royal Naval Air Service

United States

- American Expeditionary Force

Venezuela

- Venezuelan Air Force - Two aircraft only.
- Venezuelan Navy

=== Civil operators ===
Colombia

- Compañía Colombiana de Navegación Aérea (CCNA)

== Specifications (F.40 with Renault 130 hp engine) ==
Data from French aircraft of the First World War, The Encyclopedia of World Aircraft

General characteristics

- Crew: 2
- Length: 9.25 m (30 ft 4 in)
- Wingspan: 17.59 m (57 ft 9 in)
- Height: 3.9 m (12 ft 10 in)
- Wing area: 52 m^{2} (560 sq ft)
- Empty weight: 748 kg (1,649 lb)
- Gross weight: 1,120 kg (2,469 lb)
- Powerplant: 1 × Renault 130 hp V-12 air-cooled piston engine, 97 kW (130 hp)
- Propellers: 2-bladed fixed-pitch pusher propeller

Performance

- Maximum speed: 135 km/h (84 mph, 73 kn) at 2,000 m (6,600 ft)
- Range: 420 km (260 mi, 230 nmi)
- Endurance: 2 hours 20 minutes
- Service ceiling: 4,050 m (13,290 ft)
- Time to altitude: 2,000 m (6,600 ft) in 15 minutes

Armament

- Guns: 1x or 2x 7.70 mm (0.303 in) Lewis machine-gun
- Rockets: (F.40P) 10 × Le Prieur rockets
- Bombs: 240 kg (530 lb) of bombs

== Bibliography ==
- Antoniu, Dan (2014). Illustrated History of Romanian Aeronautics. ISBN 978-973-0-17209-6.
- Cony, Christophe (July 1997). "Aviateur d'Observation en 14/18 (deuxième partie)" [Observation Aircraft of 14/18]. Avions: Toute l'aéronautique et son histoire (in French) (52): 10–15. ISSN 1243-8650.
- Davilla, Dr. James J.; Soltan, Arthur M. (January 2002). French Aircraft of the First World War. Flying Machines Press. pp. 233–244. ISBN 1891268090.
- Donald, David (1997). "Farman F.40". The Encyclopedia of World Aircraft. Prospero Books. p. 399. ISBN 1-85605-375-X.
- Klaauw, Bart van der (March–April 1999). "Unexpected Windfalls: Accidentally or Deliberately, More than 100 Aircraft 'arrived' in Dutch Territory During the Great War". Air Enthusiast (80): 54–59. ISSN 0143-5450.
- Liron, Jean (1984). Les avions Farman. Collection Docavia. Vol. 21. Paris: Éditions Larivière. OCLC 37146471.
