= Renault 70 hp =

70 hp/Type WB
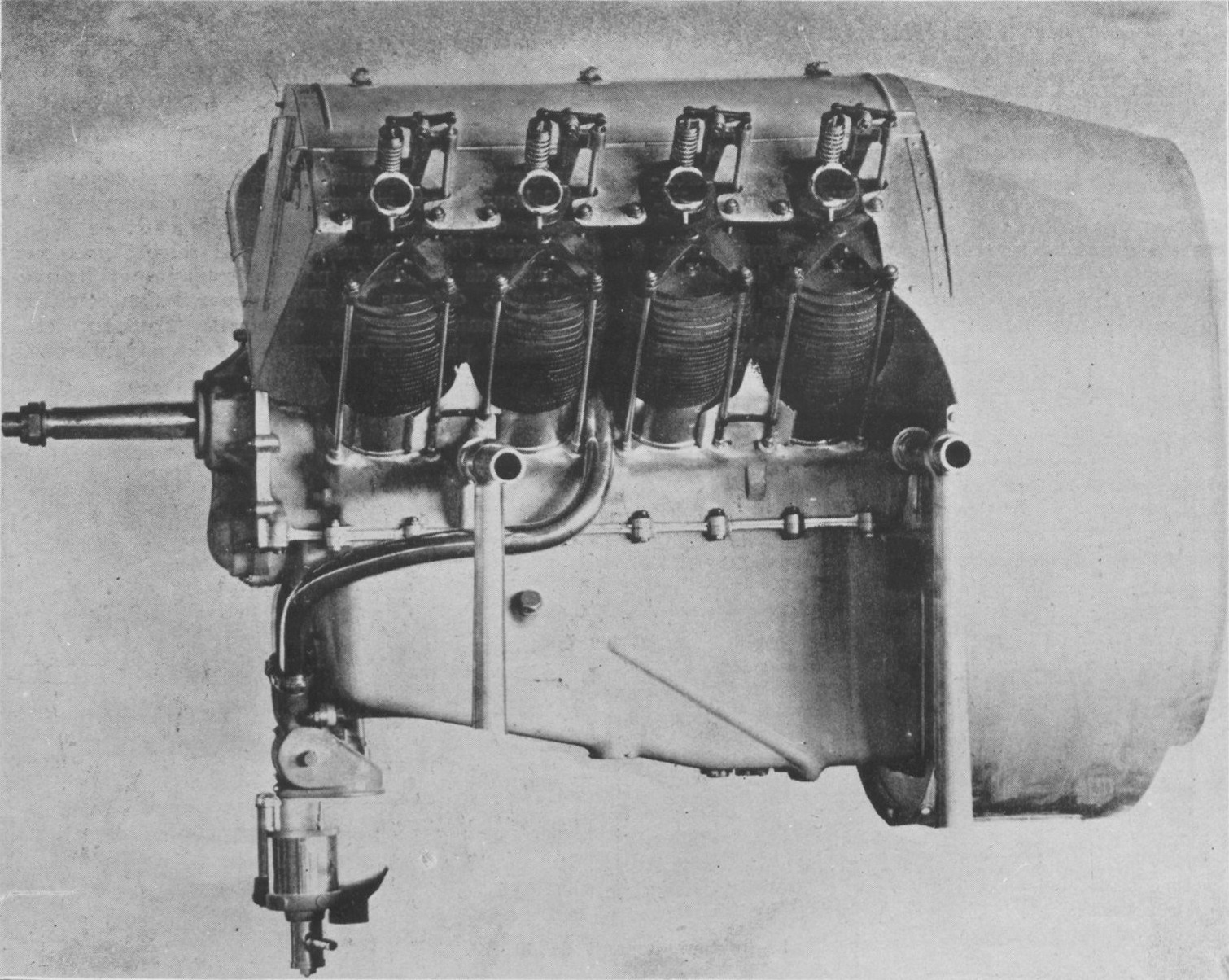
- Type: Air-cooled V8 piston engine
- National origin: France
- Manufacturer: Renault; Rolls Royce; Wolseley Motors; Airco; Mitsubishi
- First run: 1910
- Major applications: Farman MF.7; Royal Aircraft Factory B.E.2
- Number built: 1,200 (France); 230 (United Kingdom); 15 (Japan)
- Developed from: Renault 50/60 hp
- Developed into: Renault 80 hp; Renault 90 hp; RAF 1

The Renault 70 hp, (8Ab , 8C) is a French V8 aero engine that first ran in 1910. The type powered many early military aircraft including the Farman MF.7 Longhorn and the Royal Aircraft Factory B.E.2. In addition to French production, these engines were also built in the United Kingdom and equipped the majority of British aircraft sent to France at the start of WW1.

== Design and development ==
As with other Renault air cooled V8s, the engine has an early form of reduction gearing where the propeller is fixed to the end of the camshaft and turns at half engine speed. This method of gearing allowed the engine and propeller to be run close to their optimum speeds without the additional weight penalty of a gearbox. Engines intended for pusher aircraft were fitted with a centrifugal blower which fed cooling air over the large finned cast iron cylinders.

Compared to contemporary air cooled rotary engines built by Gnome, the 70 hp Renault had a worse power to weight ratio but better fuel economy. Aircraft powered by the Renault 70 hp set distance and duration records in 1912.

The first military orders were placed in 1911 with 81 engines delivered to the French army for use in Farman observation aircraft. In 1912 Farman aircraft powered by the Renault 70 hp equipped two out of the five French squadrons.

In the United Kingdom the 70 hp air cooled V8 model was manufactured by Renault's British subsidiary and their licensees; Rolls Royce, Wolseley and Airco. Renault refused to sell licenses to German firms in the years before WW1.

In Japan, the Provisional Military Balloon Research Association began assembling Renault 70 hp aircraft engines from imported components as early as 1913. From 1915, unlicensed copies were manufactured by the workshops of Dr Kishi Kazuta. Mitsubishi commenced licensed production at its Kobe plant in 1916, marking the company's entry into aircraft engine manufacture; a total of 15 engines were completed.

== Variants ==
Data from Wolseley Motors's 1917 instruction manual. Weights shown include flywheel, exhaust branches, cowl and propeller boss.

Type W.B - Version with internal lube oil pump. Dry weight: 440 lb (200 kg)

Type W.C - Version with external lube oil pump. Dry weight: 440 lb (200 kg)

Both the W.B and W.C variants were available for pusher (propeller at back) and tractor (propeller at front) aircraft. Engines fitted to tractor aircraft had a cowl scoop which directed part of the propellers air steam across the cylinders. Engines fitted to pusher aircraft were equipped with a back mounted (opposite end from prop) centrifugal blower. The blower added an extra 50 lb (22.7 kg) of weight and consumed 4 hp (3.0 kW).

Type W.X - 75 hp variant. Outwardly almost identical to the 70 hp models but with a larger 100 mm (3.9 in) cylinder bore and redesigned connecting rods. The connecting rods used the same side by side layout as the 70 hp model but had a two-stud design. Same external lube oil pump design as the type W.C. Dry weight: 455 lb (206 kg). Nominal power output: 75 hp (56 kW). Actual power output: 80 hp (60 kW) at 1,800 rpm.

== Applications ==
- Airco DH.1
- Armstrong Whitworth F.K.2
- SS class airships
- Blackburn Type E
- Breguet Type IV
- Bristol B.R.7
- Central Centaur IVA
- Farman MF.7 Longhorn
- Farman MF.11 Shorthorn
- Flanders F.4
- Royal Aircraft Factory B.E.2
- Royal Aircraft Factory F.E.2
- Royal Aircraft Factory R.E.1
- Savary Hydroaéroplane
- White & Thompson Bognor Bloater

== Survivors ==
- Norsk Teknisk Museum, Oslo

== Specifications (70 hp) ==
Data from Lumsden and Angle. Note: Figures are for British built W.B variant designed to be mounted in tractor configuration.

=== General characteristics ===
- Type: Inline air–cooled, upright, 90-degree, V8 piston engine
- Bore: 3.78 in (96 mm)
- Stroke: 4.72 in (120 mm)
- Displacement: 423.76 cu in (7 L)
- Length: 45.5 in (1,156 mm)
- Width: 29.8 in (757 mm)
- Height: 32.8 in (833 mm)
- Dry weight: 396 lb (180 kg)

=== Components ===
- Valvetrain: Single overhead exhaust valve, single side inlet valve per cylinder.Although this valve arrangement is cited as "one side and one overhead valve," both valves are situated in a lateral pocket from/to which gases flow. Therefore both valves are "side valves" one on top of this lateral pocket and one on its bottom. There are no valves on the combustion chamber or on the overhead position.
- Fuel system: Single carburettor
- Fuel type: 40–50 octane petrol
- Cooling system: Air-cooled
- Reduction gear: 0.5:1, left hand tractor (there is no reduction gear as such; The reduction is achieved by mounting the propeller on the camshaft).

=== Performance ===
- Power output: 75 hp (56 kW) at 1,800 rpm (70 hp (52 kW) for models with the cooling fan designed for pusher aircraft)
- Specific power: 0.17 hp/cu in (7.4 kW/L)
- Compression ratio: 4.12:1
- Fuel consumption: 7.25 gallon/hr (27.4 L/hr)
- Specific fuel consumption: 0.64 lb/(hp⋅h) (0.39 kg/kWh)
- Oil consumption: 6.5 pints/hr (3 L/hr)
- Power-to-weight ratio: 0.19 lb/hp (0.12 kg/kW)

== See also ==
Comparable engines

- De Dion-Bouton 78 hp

Related lists

- List of aircraft engines
