= Farman MF.7 =

French pre-WW1 reconnaissance aircraft

MF.7
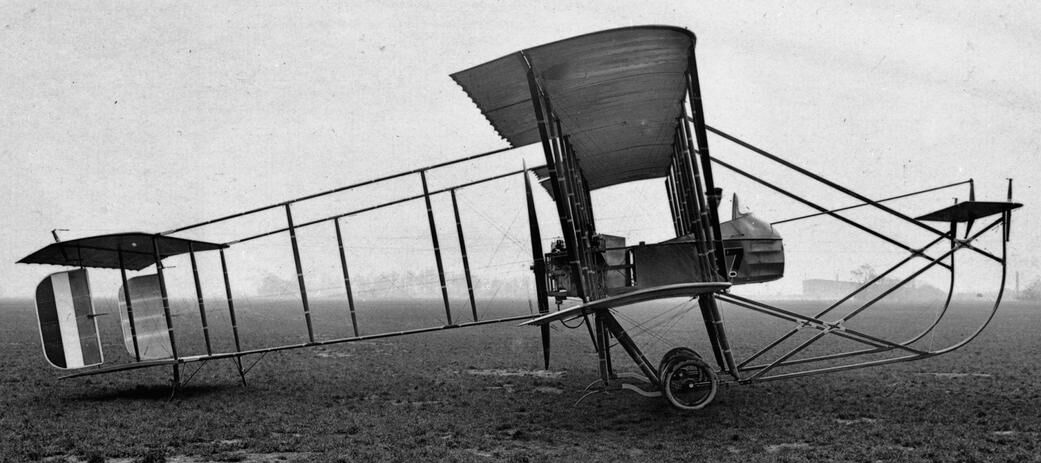

General information
- Type: Reconnaissance
- Manufacturer: Farman Aviation Works
- Designer: Maurice Farman
- Primary users: French Air Force Royal Flying Corps; Australian Flying Corps; Royal Danish Air Force

History
- Retired: 1922

The Maurice Farman MF.7 Longhorn is a French biplane developed before World War I which was used for reconnaissance by both the French and British air services in the early stages of the war before being relegated to service as a trainer.

== Design and development ==
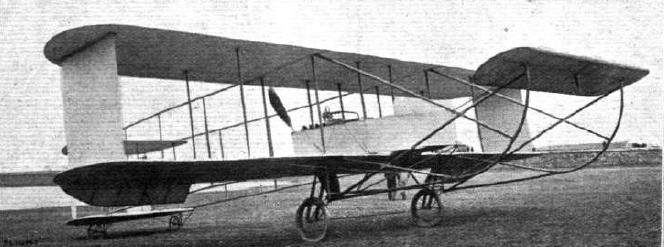
Maurice Farman's 1910 biplane

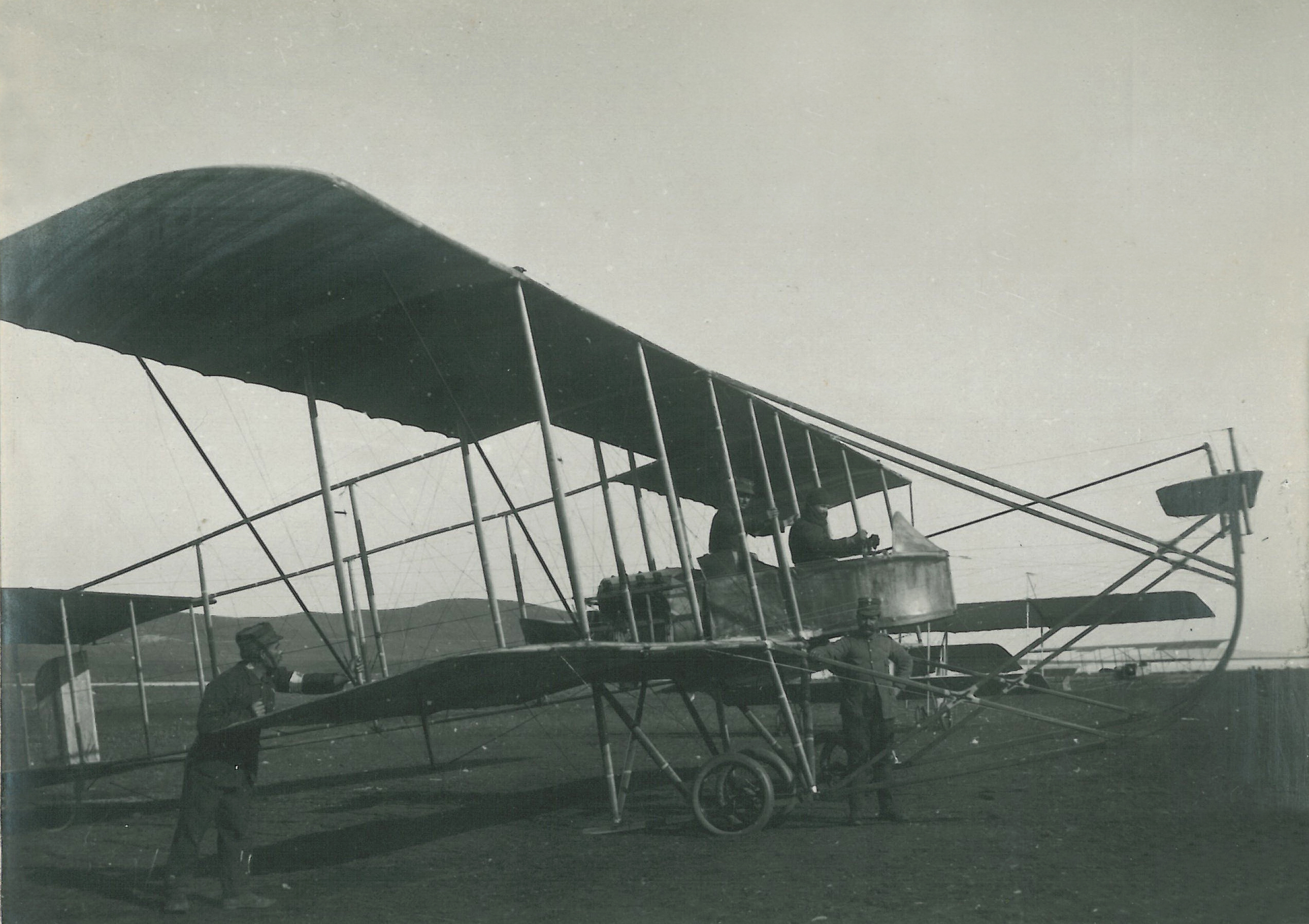
MF.7 Longhorn at Preveza in 1912

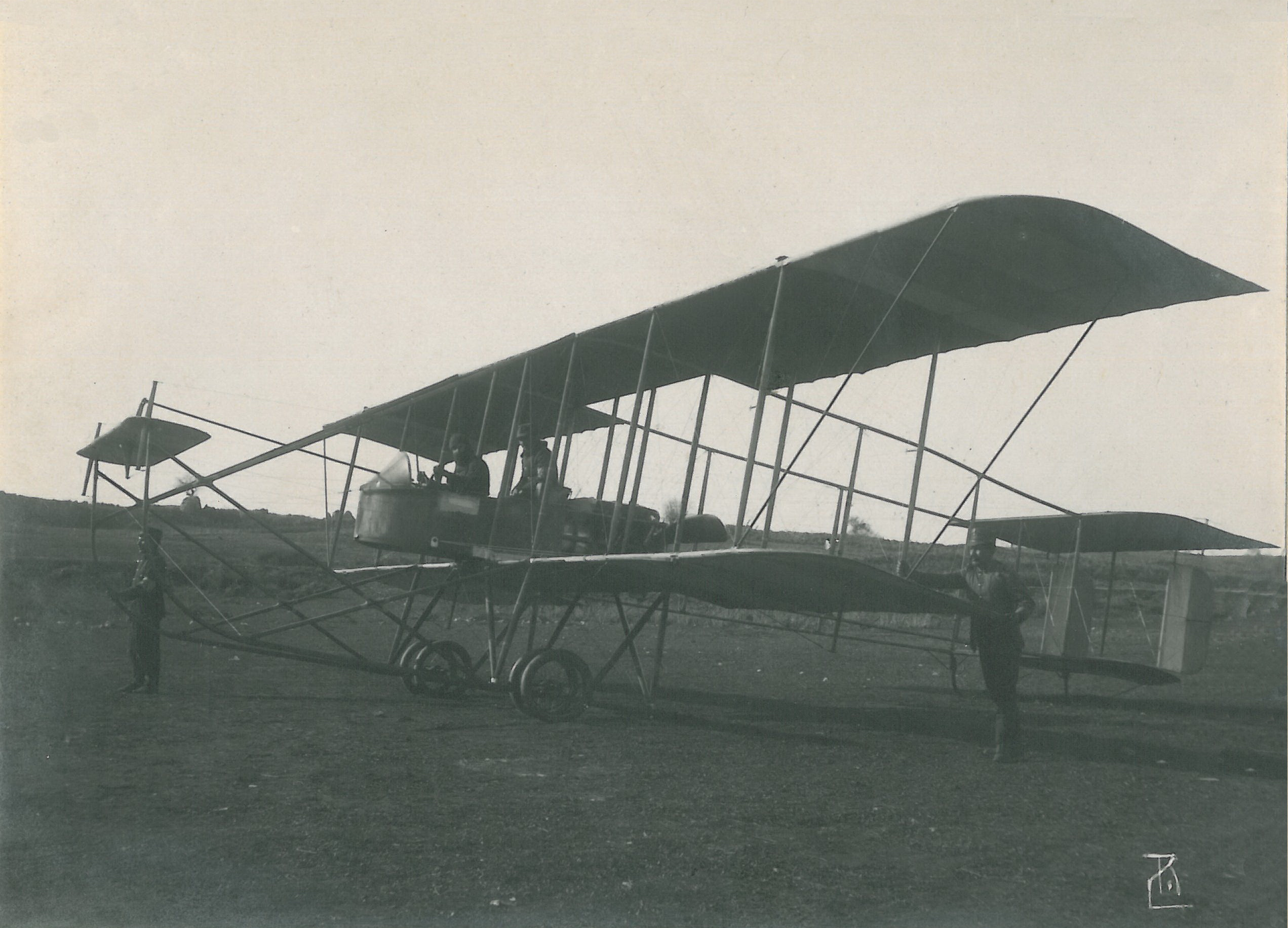
MF.7 Longhorn at Preveza in 1913

The "Longhorn" is a three bay biplane with a forward elevator mounted on upcurved extensions of the landing skids and an empennage carried on four booms consisting of biplane horizontal stabilizers with an elevator attached to the trailing edge of the upper surface and twin rudders. The airframe was constructed using a combination of ash and silver spruce, and many of the members including the outer interplane struts and the outrigger booms carrying the tail surfaces are hollow. It is powered by a Renault air-cooled V8 engine driving a pusher propeller mounted at the back of a fabric-covered nacelle. The propeller is mounted on the engine's camshaft, and therefore revolves at half the engine speed. Its name was derived from the distinctive front-mounted elevator and elongated skids.

The design originated with Maurice Farman's second aircraft, which was built in 1910. This was 12.75 m (41.8 ft) long and had upper and lower wings both spanning 11 m (36 ft). The wings had rounded ends and the outer pair of interplane struts were fabric-covered to form voisin-style side curtains. The undercarriage was also of Voisin pattern, with a pair of mainwheels mounted on trailing arms below the skids. Lateral control was effected by ailerons mounted on the lower wings only. Pitch control was effected solely by a front-mounted elevator, the tail surfaces consisting of biplane fixed stabilising surfaces and twin rudders. The gap between the wings was 1.5 m (5 ft).

The side curtains were soon removed, and subsequent aircraft, including that flown by Maurice Tabateau to win the 1910 Michelin Cup, had square-ended wings and modified tail surfaces, with an elevator added to the upper rear stabiliser.

The 1911 Maurice Farman aircraft flown to win the Michelin Puy de Dôme prize had an increased wingspan, the upper wing spanning 16 m (52 ft 6 in) and the lower 14.5 m (47 ft 7 in). Ailerons were mounted on both upper and lower wings. The undercarriage now had two pairs of wheels attached to the skids using elastic cords.

The Maurice Farman is the subject of a detailed technical description in the issue of Flight dated 6 July 1912. This describes it as a new type but also notes that in essence, the design was at least two years old. The aircraft described differs from earlier aircraft principally in having a 2 m (6 ft 7 in) gap between the wings.

== Operational history ==
=== Early civil flights ===
Early versions of the design were used for instruction purposes at Maurice Farman's flying school at Buc.

On October 28, 1910, Maurice Tabateau won the Coupe Michelin prize by flying 464.72 km (288.76 mi) in 6 hr 1 min 35 s

On 7 March 1911 Eugène Renaux flew an example to win the Michelin Prize offered for a passenger-carrying flight from Paris to the summit of the Puy de Dôme.

A variant with an extra bay, increasing the span of the upper wing to 20 m (66 ft), was used by Géo Fourny to set an endurance record of 720 km (450 mi) in 11 hr 29 min 11 s on 2 September 1911. This was one of the two aircraft entered by Maurice Farman for the French military aircraft competition held in November 1911. The second aircraft was of similar span, but was rigged so that it had staggered wings.

=== Military use ===
- The Australian Flying Corps (AFC), provided with the MF.7 by the British Indian Army, operated it during the Mesopotamian campaign of 1915–16.
- Some Maurice Farman 7 were sold to Spain and served with the Servicio de Aeronáutica Military since 1913.
- Four MF.7s were sold to Norway and served with the Norwegian Army Air Service.
- MF.7s were used by the Imperial Japanese forces in the World War I Battle of Tsingtao, with one downed by the German force's sole working aircraft. This was the first documented downing of an airplane in battle.
- A Greek example was converted to a hydroplane flown by Michael Moutoussis with Aristeidis Moraitinis as observer and carried out the world's first air-naval co-operation mission during the First Balkan War.

== Operators ==
United Kingdom

- Royal Flying Corps
  - No. 2 Squadron RFC
  - No. 3 Squadron RFC
  - No. 4 Squadron RFC
  - No. 5 Squadron RFC
  - No. 6 Squadron RFC
  - No. 7 Squadron RFC
  - No. 9 Squadron RFC
  - No. 15 Squadron RFC
  - No. 30 Squadron RFC
  - No. 41 Squadron RFC

Australia

- Australian Flying Corps
  - Central Flying School AFC at Point Cook, Victoria
  - Mesopotamian Half Flight

Belgium

- Belgian Air Force

Denmark

- Royal Danish Air Force

France

- French Air Force

Greece

- Royal Hellenic Navy
- Royal Hellenic Air Force

Italy

- Corpo Aeronautico Militare

Japan

- Imperial Japanese Navy Air Service

Mexico

- Mexican Air Force

Norway

- Norwegian Army Air Service operated four aircraft until the late 1920s

Romania

- Romanian Air Corps

Russia

- Imperial Russian Air Service

Spain

- Spanish Air Force

== Surviving aircraft ==
A Maurice Farman MF.7 "Longhorn" formerly of the Belgian army, now on display at the Musée de l'Air et de l'Espace in Paris.

- Musée de l'Air et de l'Espace, Paris
- Norsk Teknisk Museum, Oslo

== Specifications (MF.7) ==
Data from Encyclopedia of Military Aircraft

General characteristics

- Crew: 2
- Length: 11.35 m (37 ft 3 in)
- Wingspan: 15.4 m (50 ft 6 in)
- Height: 3.45 m (11 ft 4 in)
- Gross weight: 855 kg (1,885 lb)
- Powerplant: 1 × Renault 70 hp V-8 air-cooled piston engine, 52 kW (70 hp)

Performance

- Maximum speed: 95 km/h (59 mph, 51 kn)
- Service ceiling: 4,000 m (13,000 ft)

== See also ==
Related development

- Farman MF.11

Related lists

- List of military aircraft of France

== Bibliography ==
- Liron, Jean (1984). Les avions Farman. Collection Docavia. Vol. 21. Paris: Éditions Larivière. OCLC 37146471.
- Bruce, J. M. (1982). The Aeroplanes of the Royal Flying Corps (Military Wing). London: Putnam. ISBN 0-370-30084-X.
