= Renault 80 hp =

V8 piston aircraft engine

80 hp/Type WS
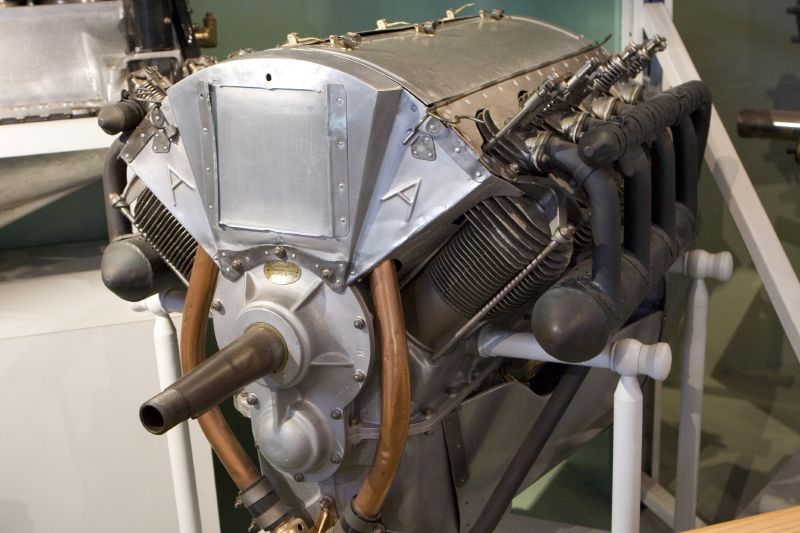
- Renault 80 hp at the Canada Aviation Museum
- Type: Air-cooled V8 piston engine
- Manufacturer: Renault; Rolls Royce; Wolseley Motors; Airco; Brazil Straker; Vickers; Swift Aeronautical
- First run: 1913
- Major applications: Airco DH.6
- Number built: 2,216
- Developed from: Renault 70 hp
- Developed into: ADC Airdisco

The Renault 80 hp, or 8Ca, or Type WS is a development of the Renault 70 hp V8 aero engine that was produced exclusively in the United Kingdom by Renault's British subsidiary, and its licensees, from 1913 to 1918.

Apart from being physically larger, the only major design change between the 80 hp and the earlier 70 hp model was the use of articulated connecting rods. As a result, corresponding cylinders in each row were arranged directly opposite.

== Applications ==
- Airco DH.6
- Alliance P.1
- Avro 548
- Farman MF.11 Shorthorn
- Farman F.41 and F.1,41
- Royal Aircraft Factory S.E.5 (single postwar civilian conversion)
- Vickers F.B.7A

== Engines on display ==
- A preserved Renault 80 hp is on display at the Canada Aviation Museum
- A partially cut open Renault 80 hp engine is on display at the Science Museum in London
- Another one on display at the Museo Nacional de Aeronautica in Morón -Buenos Aires-Argentina

== Specifications (80 hp) ==
Data from Lumsden

=== General characteristics ===
- Type: Inline air-cooled, upright, 90-degree, V8 piston engine
- Bore: 4.13 in (105 mm)
- Stroke: 5.12 in (130 mm)
- Displacement: 548.9 cu in (9 L)
- Length: 50.6 in (1,285 mm)
- Width: 35.5 in (902 mm)
- Height: 35.3 in (897 mm)
- Dry weight: 463 lb (210 kg)

=== Components ===
- Valvetrain: Single overhead exhaust valve, single side inlet valve per cylinder.Although this valve arrangement is cited as "one side and one overhead valve," both valves are situated in a lateral pocket from/to which gases flow. Therefore both valves are "side valves" one on top of this lateral pocket and one on its bottom. There are no valves on the combustion chamber or on the overhead position.
- Fuel system: Single 32 mm Claudel-Hobson carburettor
- Fuel type: 40–50 octane petrol
- Cooling system: Air-cooled
- Reduction gear: 0.5:1, left hand tractor.(There is no proper "reduction gear". The reduction in this case is achieved due to the fact that the Airscrew is mounted on the Cam Shaft, therefore the shaft rotation speed, and so the airscrew, is half of the crank speed)

=== Performance ===
- Power output: 80 hp (60 kW) at 1,800 rpm (nominal)
- Specific power: 0.15 hp/cu in (6.7 kW/L)
- Compression ratio: 4.16:1
- Power-to-weight ratio: 0.17 hp/lb (0.28 kW/kg)

== See also ==
Related development

- RAF 1

Comparable engines

- Curtiss OX-5
- De Dion-Bouton 78 hp

Related lists

- List of aircraft engines
