= Farman MF.11 =

French WW1 reconnaissance aircraft

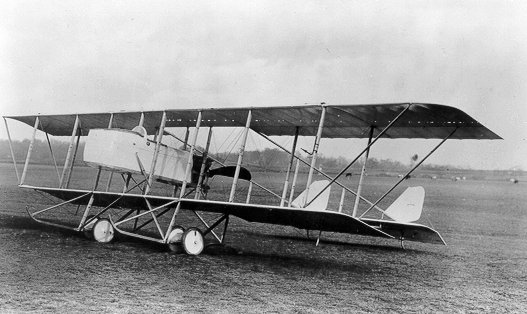

General information
- Type: Reconnaissance / Bomber
- Manufacturer: Farman Aviation Works
- Designer: Maurice Farman
- Primary users: French Air Force Royal Flying Corps

History
- Introduction date: May 1914
- First flight: 1913
- Developed from: Farman MF.7

The Maurice Farman MF.11 Shorthorn is a French aircraft developed before World War I by the Farman Aviation Works. It was used as a reconnaissance and light bomber during the early part of World War I, later being relegated to training duties.

The Maurice Farman Shorthorn was the aircraft in which Biggles, Capt W.E. Johns' fictional character, first took to the air in "Biggles Learns To Fly".

== Design and development ==
A pusher configuration unequal-span biplane like the earlier Farman MF.7, the MF.11 differed in lacking the forward-mounted elevator, the replacement of the biplane horizontal tail surfaces with a single surface with a pair of rudders mounted above it, and the mounting of the nacelle containing crew and engine in the gap between the two wings. The aircraft was also fitted with a machine gun for the observer, whose position was changed from the rear seat to the front in order to give a clear field of fire.

Its nickname in British service was derived from that of the MF.7 Longhorn, as it lacked the characteristic front-mounted elevator and elongated skids of its predecessor. The aircraft was also referred to by British pilots as the Rumpty.

From 1914, Farman built a modified version of the MF.11 for French army with a larger wingspan of 21 m (69 ft) and powered by a 100 hp Renault V-12 which was known as the Farman MF.12 or Type Armee XXVI.

== Operational history ==
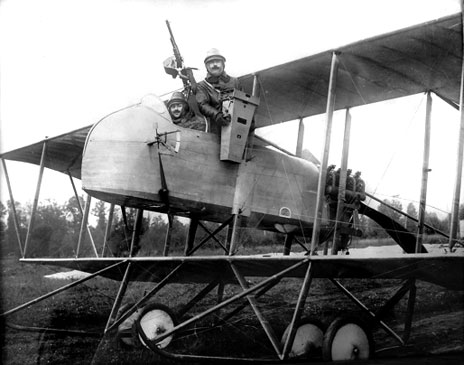
Reconnaissance version of the MF.11 with camera detail

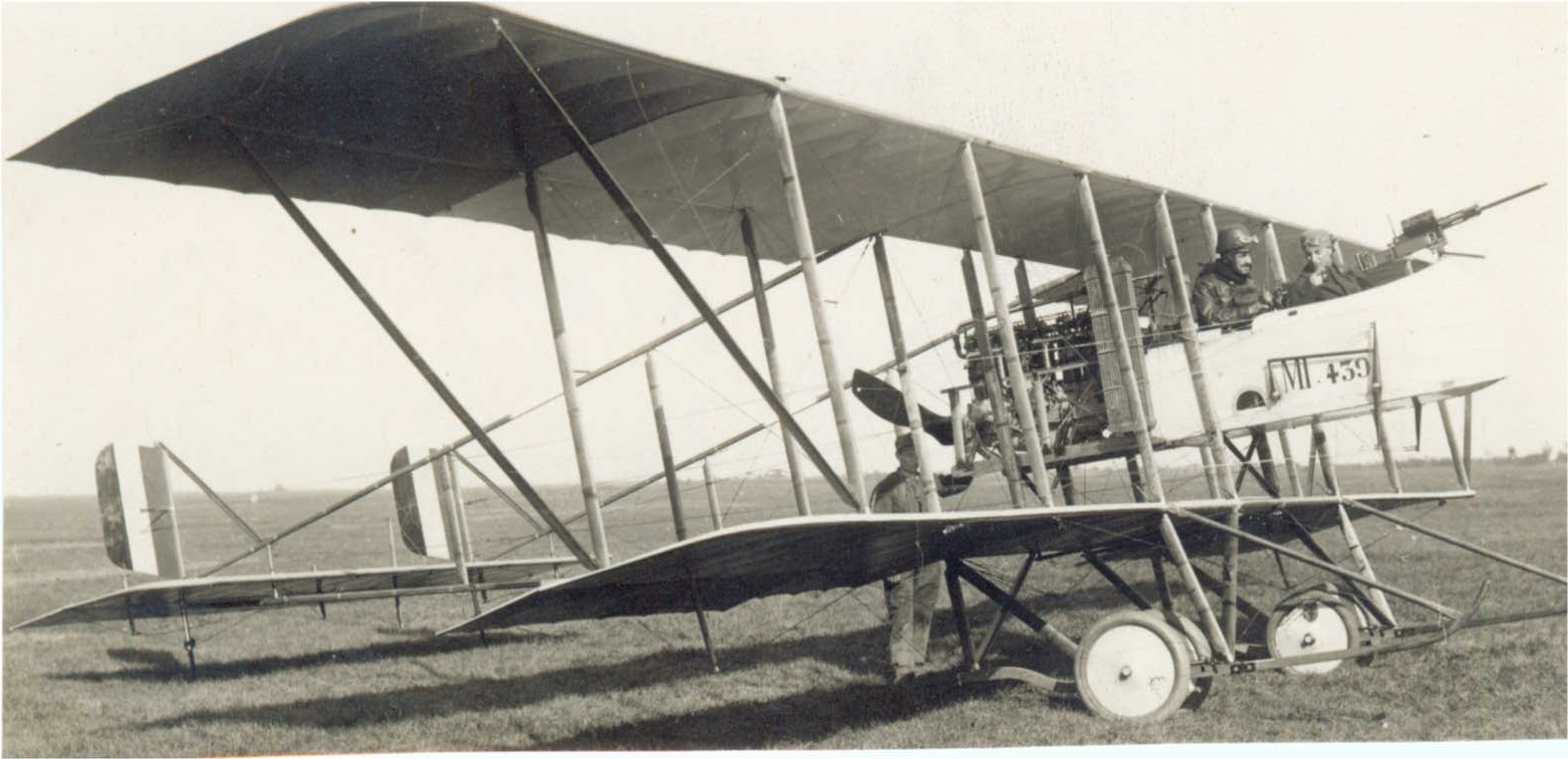
Italian air force MF.11

On 6 September 1914, the first air-sea battle took place when a Japanese Farman MF.11 aircraft launched by the seaplane carrier Wakamiya unsuccessfully attacked SMS Kaiserin Elisabeth with bombs.

The MF.11 served in both the British and French air services on the Western Front in the early stages of the war. It flew the first bombing raid of the war when, on 21 December 1914, an MF.11 of the Royal Naval Air Service attacked German artillery positions around Ostend, Belgium.

The MF.11 was withdrawn from front-line service on the Western Front in 1915 but continued to be used by the French in Macedonia and the Middle East, while the British also used it in the Dardanelles and Africa. The Australian Flying Corps (AFC), provided with the MF.11 by the British Indian Army, operated it during the Mesopotamian campaign of 1915–16.

Following its withdrawal from frontline service, the MF.11 continued to be used by the British in flight schools where it became known as the Rumpty (or Rumpety). Despite its archaic looks, the MF.11 was regarded as a good aircraft for trainee pilots as its sturdy build meant that bad landings rarely caused damage to the undercarriage.

Italy's Società Italiana Aviazione, a Fiat company, licence-built a number of MF.11s under the designation SIA 5 from early 1915, fitted with a fixed forward machine gun and a 74.5 kW (100 hp) Fiat A.10 engine.

In 1916, the AFC also bought some MF.11s for training purposes.

== Operators ==
Australia

- Australian Flying Corps
  - No. 5 (Training) Squadron AFC in United Kingdom
  - Mesopotamian Half Flight
  - Central Flying School AFC at Point Cook, Victoria

Belgium

- Belgian Air Force

France

- French Air Force

Italy

- Corpo Aeronautico Militare

Greece

- Hellenic Air Force

Kingdom of Hejaz

- Hejaz Air Force - Two Farman MF.11s were obtained from Italy in 1921.

Japan

- Imperial Japanese Army Air Service

Norway

- Royal Norwegian Air Force

Portugal

- Portuguese Air Force

Romania

- Romanian Air Corps

Russia

- Imperial Russian Air Force

Saudi Arabia

- Royal Saudi Air Force

Serbia

- Serbian Air Force

Spain

- Spanish Air Force

Switzerland

- Swiss Air Force

Ukraine

- Ukrainian Air Force - One aircraft only.

United Kingdom

- Royal Flying Corps
  - No. 2 Squadron RFC
  - No. 3 Squadron RFC
  - No. 4 Squadron RFC
  - No. 9 Squadron RFC
  - No. 14 Squadron RFC
  - No. 16 Squadron RFC
  - No. 19 Squadron RFC
  - No. 23 Squadron RFC
  - No. 24 Squadron RFC
  - No. 25 Squadron RFC
  - No. 29 Squadron RFC
  - No. 30 Squadron RFC
  - No. 65 Squadron RFC
- Royal Naval Air Service

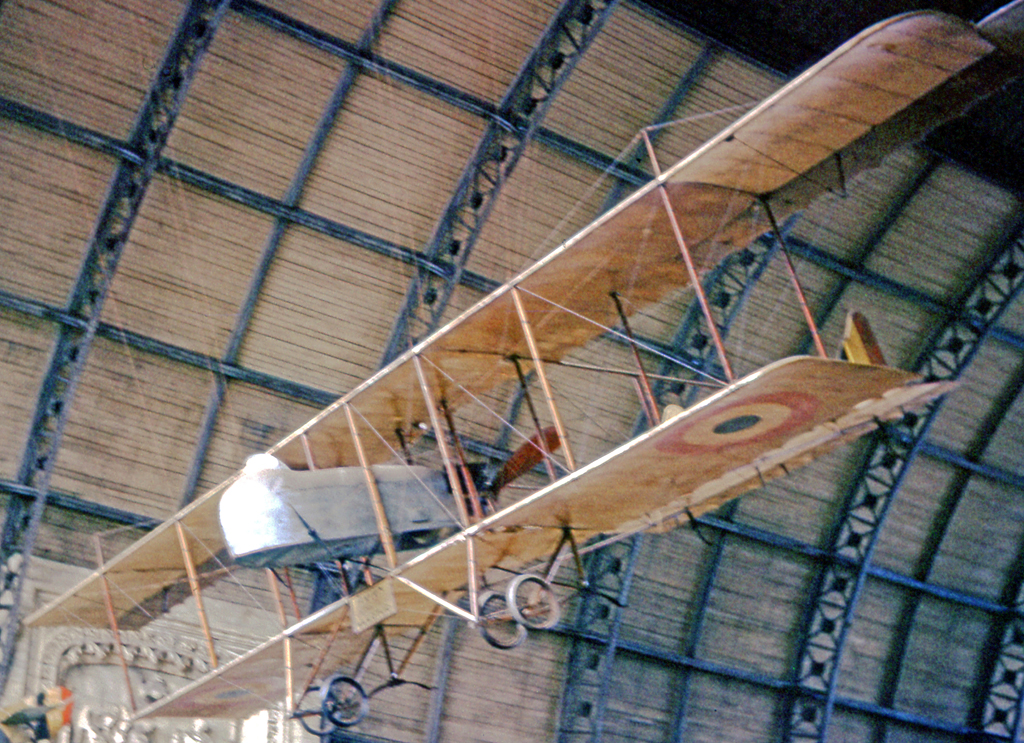
Belgian Air Force Farman F-11 A.2 in the Brussels War Museum in July 1965

== Surviving aircraft ==
- The Canada Aviation Museum has an MF.11 manufactured by Airco for the Royal Flying Corps and sent to Australia in 1917.
- Farman F.11A-2, Royal Army and Military History Museum, Brussels, Belgium.
- Farman MF.11 Shorthorn (#CFS-20, RAAF Museum at Point Cook, Victoria, Australia.

== Specifications (Farman MF.11) ==
Data from British and Allied Aircraft Manufacturers of the First World War

General characteristics

- Crew: 2 (pilot & observer/gunner)
- Length: 9.3 m (30 ft 6 in)
- Wingspan: 15.7 m (51 ft 6 in)
- Height: 3.1 m (10 ft 2 in)
- Empty weight: 654 kg (1,442 lb)
- Gross weight: 928 kg (2,046 lb)
- Powerplant: 1 × Renault 80 hp V-8 air-cooled piston engine
- Propellers: 4-bladed fixed-pitch pusher propeller

Performance

- Maximum speed: 116 km/h (72 mph, 63 kn)

Armament

- Guns: 1 × 7.62 mm (0.30 in) machine gun

== See also ==
Related development

- Farman MF.7
- Farman F.40

Related lists

- List of military aircraft of France
- List of pusher aircraft by configuration
- List of World War I Entente aircraft

== Bibliography ==
- Cony, Christophe (July 1997). "Aviateur d'Observation en 14/18 (deuxième partie)" [Observation Aircraft of 14/18]. Avions: Toute l'aéronautique et son histoire (in French) (52): 10–15. ISSN 1243-8650.
- Liron, Jean (1984). Les avions Farman. Collection Docavia. Vol. 21. Paris: Éditions Larivière. OCLC 37146471.
