= Keith Brown =

Keith Brown may refer to:

== Sports ==
- Keith Brown (baseball) (born 1964), American baseball pitcher
- Keith Brown (basketball), coach in 2010–11 NCAA Division I men's basketball season
- Keith Brown (cricketer) (born 1963), English cricketer
- Keith Brown (ice hockey) (born 1960), Canadian ice hockey player
- Keith Brown (footballer, born 1954), English footballer (Grimsby Town)
- Keith Brown (footballer, born 1979), Scottish footballer (Barnsley FC, Oxford United, Falkirk FC)
- Keith Brown (pole vaulter) (1913–1991), American athlete and politician
- Keith Brown (sprinter), winner of the 1978 NCAA Division I outdoor 4 × 400 meter relay championship
- Keith Brown (hurdler), American hurdler, 2014 relay All-American for the Iowa Hawkeyes track and field team

== Politicians ==
- Keith Brown (Ontario politician) (1926–2015), retired businessperson and politician
- Keith Brown (pole vaulter) (1913–1991), American politician and athlete
- Keith Brown (Scottish politician) (born 1961), depute leader of the Scottish National Party and former Scottish government minister
- Keith Brown (New York politician) (born 1968), member of the New York State Assembly
- Keith L. Brown (diplomat) (1925–2016), American diplomat

== Others ==
- Keith Brown, former stage manager of the piano group The 5 Browns
- Keith Brown (born 1967), technical and security author and co-founder of Pluralsight
- Keith Brown (linguist) (1935–2025), British linguist
- Keith Kendle Brown (1901–1939), British aviator known as K. K. Brown
- Keith L. Brown (musician) (born 1983), American jazz pianist, educator, and composer
- Old Dry Keith, British petroleum engineer known for his bland sandwiches
