= Bekesbourne Aerodrome =

British airfield, 1916–1940

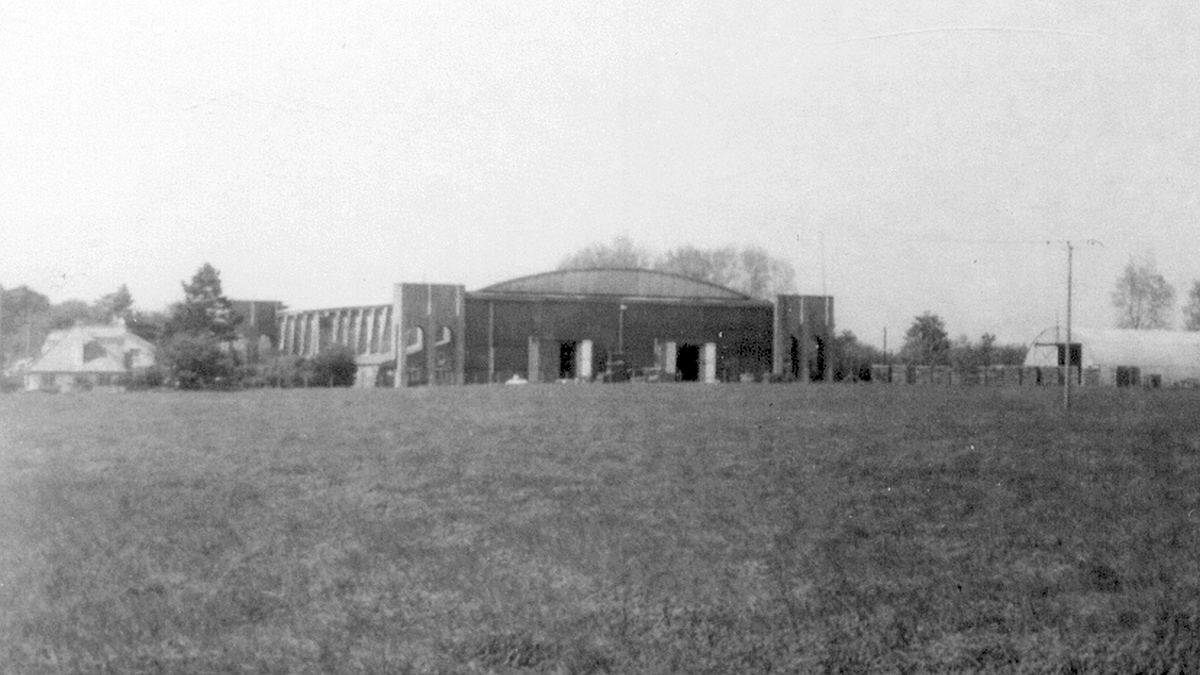
- IATA: none; ICAO: none

Summary
- Airport type: Private
- Serves: Canterbury
- Location: 6 km (3.7 mi) southeast of Canterbury
- Opened: 1916
- Closed: 1940
- Elevation AMSL: 170 ft (52 m)
- Coordinates: 51°15′16″N 1°9′22″E

Map
- Interactive map of Bekesbourne Aerodrome

Bekesbourne Aerodrome was an airport located at the southeast edge of the village of Bekesbourne, southeast of Canterbury, Kent. It operated from 1916 until 1940, and had both military and civil roles.

== History ==
=== World War I ===
The airfield started as RFC Bekesbourne when the Royal Flying Corps requisitioned 98 acres (40 ha) of land in 1916 as an Emergency Landing Ground (ELG). B flight of No. 50 (Home Defence) Squadron moved in, operating Armstrong Whitworth F.K.3 and F.K.8 and Royal Aircraft Factory B.E.2 and B.E.12 aircraft. Very little action was seen. After a German bombing raid on London in 1917, some S.E.5 aircraft from No.56 Squadron were brought in between 21 June and 5 July, but again, no combat operations were undertaken.

Despite the land being on a slope, and quite restricted in dimensions (there is a railway line on the northern boundary), 50 Squadron moved in entirely on 8 February 1918, and soon standardised on the S.E.5A fighter. With the creation of the Royal Air Force on 1 April, the Squadron's duties expanded at what was now RAF Bekesbourne, and it upgraded its tents and temporary buildings. The S.E.5A aircraft were found to take too long to warm up, and during August were replaced by 24 Sopwith Camels.

By September 1918 two Belfast Truss hangars had been completed, along with other buildings. The squadron nicknamed its hangar "The Nest". The commanding officer from December 1918 until disbandment was Major A T Harris AFC., later Marshal of the Royal Air Force Sir Arthur Harris GCB OBE AFC. 50 Squadron was disbanded in June 1919.

=== Inter-war years ===
During 1919, dozens of Sopwith Snipes were stored at the airfield, some direct from the manufacturer, and were all burned. In 1920 the RAF relinquished the airfield and civilian flying started.

The airfield was named Canterbury Airport. though it was usually referred to as Bekesbourne Aerodrome even in official papers such as aircraft registration documents where that name is given as the "Usual Station". There is no record of any scheduled services using the airport.

A notable occupant of the airport was Dr. Edward Douglas Whitehead Reid, a senior surgeon at Kent and Canterbury Hospital. In 1919 he bought an old Airco DH.6 which he kept at the airport - becoming the first owner in Britain of a private aircraft after World War I. He went on to own several further aircraft, all based here, which he used for visiting patients, touring, joyriding flights, and competitions. He became very well known in aviation circles, and when he was killed in a crash in 1930, one of the tributes at his funeral came from Amy Johnson.

The Kent Gliding Club had a base here. Dr Whitehead Reid was a member, and in 1930 became its president.

In 1930, the landowner Robert Christian Ramsay set up Kent Aircraft Services. This company operated the airfield and built Avro 504K aircraft from spare parts (see list below). He also established Kent Flying Club in 1931, setting up a workshop, offices and a lounge and bar in the hangar. Their first aircraft were an autogyro, Cierva C.19 G-ABUH, and a De Havilland DH.60M Moth, G-AAKO. (Note: There is movie film of a Kent Flying Club social event, the Cerva G-ABUH and the hangar taken by Robert Ramsay in 1932.) One of the club's first students was the owner, RC Ramsay, then aged 71, who gained his "A" licence after 20 hours dual teaching from the instructor, Fit-Lt J. H, Barringer.

Both organisations were transferred to a new company, Airsales & Service Ltd in 1934. The new company traded as aircraft dealers and as an aircraft maintenance and repair organisation. Aircraft ownership seemed to transfer easily between RC Ramsay, Kent Flying Club, and Airsales & Service, with most at some time operating with the club. They all appear to have ceased operations when the airfield was closed by the start of WWII, and Airsales & Service Ltd was wound up in 1945.

==== Aircraft built by Kent Aircraft Services ====
These were all Avro 504K aircraft built from spare parts and fitted with three seats.

- G-AAUJ c/n KAS.1 registered 2 February 1930
- G-AAUK c/n KAS.2 registered 7 February 1930
- G-AAUL c/n KAS.3 registered 7 February 1930
- G-AAWC c/n KAS.5 registered April 1930
- G-AAWD c/n KAS.4 registered April 1930
- G-ABJF c/n KAS.6 registered March 1931
- G-ABOL c/n KAS.7 registered 23 July 1931

Another notable user of the airport was Michael Randrup, who started his training here in 1935 and gained his pilot's licence in 1936. He possibly used DH.60G Gipsy Moth G-ABJZ which his cousin Ivan C Randrup kept here from October 1936 until he sold it to Airsales & Service on 5 July 1938. He went on to become chief test pilot for D. Napier & Son, in which role he piloted English Electric Canberra B.2 WK163 to set a new world aeroplane altitude record of 70,310 feet (21,430 m) in 1957.

In the 1930s, flying circuses were very popular, and visited hundreds of venues, from official airfields to appropriate farms or waste land. It is thought that the following flying circuses visited Bekesbourne: Alan Cobham’s Flying Circus, British Hospitals Air Pageant Tour, British Empire Air Display Tour, Coronation Air Displays Tour.

A section of the Civil Air Guard was established here in 1938, but the airport was closed on the outbreak of war in 1939.

=== World War II ===
Despite having been closed in 1939, the airfield was reactivated for a short period in 1940, when, on 20 May, Westland Lysanders of No. 2 Squadron RAF arrived. They were joined for two days (29 and 30 May) by Lysanders from No. 13 Squadron. The Lysanders made armed reconnaissance flights over France until 2 Squadron moved out on 8 June. The airfield was well obstructed by strakes and abandoned, never to be used again.

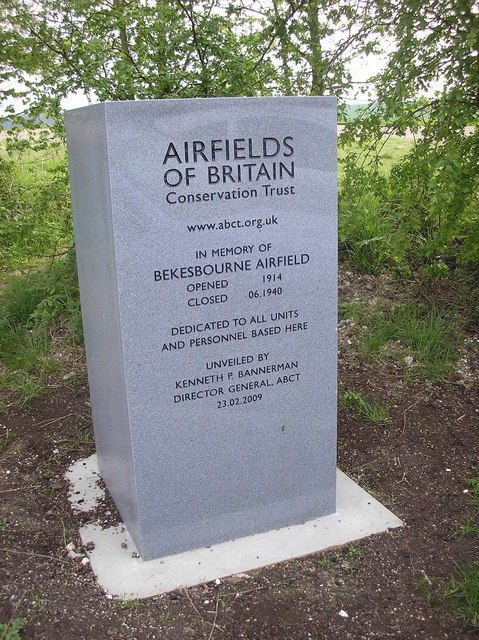
Airfields of Britain Conservation Trust Memorial

== Current use ==
Some airfield buildings, including the Officers’ Mess and combined station chapel and NAAFI, have been converted into bungalows. One of the Belfast Truss Hangars survived the war, and was converted to a warehouse. It was severely damaged by the Great Storm of 1987. It was rebuilt afterwards, but in 1997 it was demolished and the site was redeveloped to create the De Havillands housing estate. The rest of the airfield returned to agricultural use.

Local road names reflect the existence of the airfield: Aerodrome Road, Lysander Close, and De Havillands. There are two memorial stones, one from the Airfields of Britain Conservation Trust, and one commemorating the RFC and RAF.

== Accidents and incidents ==
- On 23 June 1921, a passing aircraft, a Blériot-SPAD S.27, F-CMAY of Compagnie des Messageries Aériennes, was en route from Croydon to Le Bourget, Paris. It encountered technical problems and attempted a forced landing, possibly aiming for the aerodrome, but crashed onto the adjacent railway line, first hitting telegraph cables which would have softened the impact. The two passengers were entirely unharmed, while the pilot received minor injuries having been pinned underneath the aircraft. The aircraft was written off, and was cleared from the railway line by workmen from the aerodrome.
- On 2 January 1931 Avro 504K, G-AARV, suffered engine failure on the approach to Bekesbourne on a flight from Lympne. The aircraft was written off but the pilot and owner, Sydenham Armstrong Payne Jr, was unhurt.
- On 5 February 1933 a Martinsyde F4A Buzzard, G-ABKH, crashed on take-off. The aircraft was written off, but the pilot survived.
- On 2 September 1934 DH.60G Gipsy Moth G-AAEU, owned by RC Ramsay and operated by Kent Flying Club, stalled and crashed at Adisham, near Bekesbourne, during an aerial treasure hunt. Norman Ramsay, the owner's son, and John Wilfred James were killed, and the aircraft was written off.
- On 9 August 1937 Miles M.2 Hawk G-ADBK of Kent Flying Club stalled and spun in on approach, killing pilot Garnet Percival Lovett, the sole occupant.
- On 25 June 1939 Miles M.2 Hawk G-ACHZ of Airsales and Service Ltd stalled, crashed and caught fire at the aerodrome. The pilot, the only occupant, Cecil James Dobson was killed.
- On 21 July 1939, de Havilland DH.60G Gipsy Moth G-ABJZ of Airsales and Service Ltd and operated by Kent Flying Club, flying from Bekesbourne, collided with RAF Hawker Hind K5418 over Tilmanstone, Kent. The two occupants of the Moth, Keith Kendle 'K. K.' Brown, the Chief Flying Instructor of Kent Flying Club, and his pupil, Donovon William Alan Pragnell, were killed, as was the sole occupant of the Hind, Pilot-Officer D.C.Lewis RAFVR.
- On 24 August 1939 a landing de Havilland Moth Minor, G-AFMZ, operated by Kent Flying Club, struck and killed a cyclist riding on an adjacent road.
- On 30 August 1939 Miles M.2 Hawk G-ADVR of Airsales and Service Ltd crashed on takeoff. The aircraft was written off, but the pilot, the only occupant, was unhurt.
- On 22 May 1940, Lysander P1672 landed with three hung-up bombs which dropped off and exploded, destroying the aircraft. The pilot, G. Grant-Govan survived injured, but air gunner Horace Gwyn Jones, age 20, was killed.
