= Edward Whitehead Reid =

Pioneering British private aviator

Edward Douglas Whitehead Reid
- Born: 22 June 1883; Canterbury, Kent
- Died: 20 October 1930 (aged 47); West Kent Hospital, Maidstone, Kent
- Education: Christ's College, Cambridge
- Known for: Pioneer of British private aviation
- Spouse: Mary Dixon Harrison (1880 – 1935)
- Aviation career
- Air force: RAF
- Rank: Flight lieutenant

Edward Douglas Whitehead Reid (22 June 1883 – 20 October 1930) was a British general practitioner and surgeon who pioneered the use of private aircraft after the First World War. He was commonly known as Dr E.D. Whitehead Reid but sometimes, particularly in military contexts, as Dr E.D.W. Reid.

== Early life ==
Edward Douglas Whitehead Reid was born in Canterbury, Kent on 22 June 1883. His parents were Thomas Whitehead Reid, a general practitioner, and Emily Eliza (née Munns). He had two younger siblings, Kathleen Sibyl Reid and Thomas Roscow Reid.

He attended Tonbridge School, then on 19 October 1901 was admitted to Christ's College, Cambridge. As a medical student, he gained his BA in 1905. He moved to St Bartholomew's Hospital (Barts) and in 1909 he was appointed a house physician there. On the death of his father in 1910, he moved back to Canterbury to take over the family practice.

He was an excellent sportsman, his activities including rowing, shooting, high jump, hurdling and sprinting, becoming captain of Barts Athletic Club, and winning many prizes at the London Athletic Club. He also became an Honorary Surgeon to Kent and Canterbury Hospital, a medical officer at The King's School, Canterbury and lecturer in surgery at St Augustine's College, Canterbury. He specialised in radiography and electrotherapy.

He married Mary Dixon Harrison (1880 – 1935) on 15 August 1910 in her birth town of Berwick-on-Tweed, Northumberland. They had no children.

== Military career ==
Whitehead Reid joined the British Army on 23 March 1915 as a captain in the Royal Army Medical Corps. His first main posting was as senior surgeon at The Duchess of Westminster's Hospital, titled No.1 BRCS - British Red Cross Society Hospital at Le Touquet, France, which operated from 30 October 1914 to July 1918 in a former casino fitted out for up to 250 patients, with an X-ray room.

He was later assigned to the Egyptian Expeditionary Force as an RAF medical officer to a school of artillery observation at Heliopolis.

== Aviation ==
During his time in Egypt, Whitehead Reid started to persuade any flying instructors he could find to give him lessons, and he soon became very enthusiastic about the activity, developing into a very proficient pilot.

On leaving the RAF in 1919, he returned to Canterbury as a GP and gained the use of Bekesbourne Aerodrome, previously an RAF airfield, and its large hangar. He quickly obtained an Airco DH.6 biplane, which was registered to him on 2 December 1919. This made him the very first private aircraft owner in Britain after WWI. He gained his Royal Aero Club (RAeC) certificate (No 7883) on 27 July 1920. Very unusually, and to the envy of many, the doctor employed a full-time mechanic to care for his aircraft, whom he credited for never having had to do a forced landing throughout his flying career.

His next aircraft was an Avro 504K, a training aircraft which had been modified into a three-seat Avro 548 'Tourist' for pleasure flights, but which Whitehead Reid converted back a two-seater.

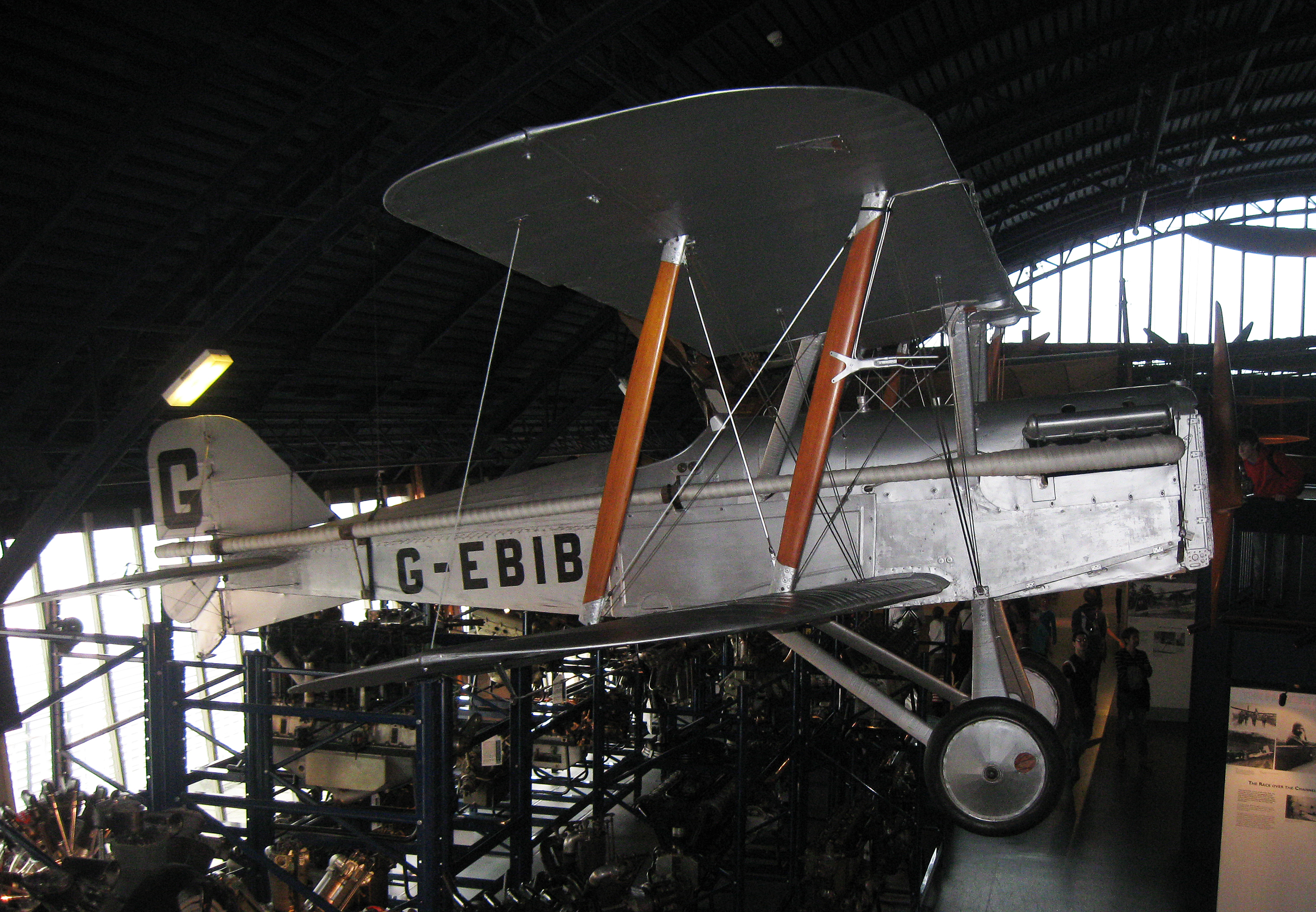
RAF SE5a G-EBIB, possibly from the same batch as those of Whitehead Reid

This was followed by a Royal Aircraft Factory S.E.5a, which was damaged beyond repair in a taxiing accident within a year, to be replaced by another. Whitehead Reid told the story of their acquisition as follows. After WWI, many SE5as were surplus to the RAF's requirements and were sold off straight from the factory for spares or scrapping, because official policy barred their sale as functioning aircraft. A worker at a factory anonymously bid for five at auction, obtaining them all for £5. Instead of destroying them, he dismantled them carefully, assembling the parts in what appeared to be a scrapheap, which he then removed. The worker, possibly named G Wigglesworth, then reassembled them to full flying condition and sold them for £30 each, with two going to Whitehead Reid, and two going to a skywriting company, possibly Savage Skywriting.

Often being alone at the airport, Whitehead Reid developed an unusual way of getting his aircraft out of the hangar by himself. He would chock the wheels, start the engine and set it to idle, then, removing the chocks, would lift the tail and guide it out under its own power.

The doctor used his aircraft for his own pleasure, but was happy to give joy rides, often supporting local charities in the process. He also used them for visiting patients who had a handy nearby field, for occasional aerobatic displays, and for visiting air meetings and races.

In 1927 the government introduced subsidies for flying clubs to train new pilots, and several new clubs were set up to take advantage. One was the East Kent Flying Club, established at Lympne, and soon renamed the Cinque Ports Flying Club in honour of its president, Earl Beauchamp, who was Lord Warden of the Cinque Ports. Whitehead Reid was a founding director.

=== Air racing ===
He took part in some of the earliest post-war aerial events, particularly at the nearby Lympne Airport which was the centre of light aircraft activity in Britain at the time. He attended some events anonymously, as his wife Mary was unhappy about him taking part in air racing. Events in which he participated include:

- 17 April 1922 Second Croydon Aviation Race Meeting at London Terminal Aerodrome, Croydon. The doctor entered the Club Handicap race and 2nd Croydon Handicap race in G-EAPW.
- 23 June 1923 Grosvenor Challenge Cup starting and finishing at Lympne. An out-and-back touring race via Croydon, Birmingham, Bristol, and Croydon again. Whitehead Reid, in G-EBCA, retired at Birmingham deciding that his machine was just too slow, and returned directly to Lympne via Croydon.
- 6 August 1923 Aerial Derby at Waddon Aerodrome (Croydon Airport) consisting of two circuits of London. The doctor, entered under the name 'A T Renno', flying SE5a G-EBCA, came in 9th, out of a field of 12.
- 3 August 1925 RAeC August Meeting at Lympne. Whitehead Reid came 2nd in a field of nine in the Private Owners' Handicap (International) race in G-EBCA.
- 18 September 1926 Lympne Light Aeroplane Trials: Whitehead Reid entered the Lympne Open Handicap (a 50-mile race) in SE5a G-EBCA but was not placed.
- 31 March 1929 Cinque Ports Flying Club meeting at Lympne. The doctor flew Westland Widgeon II G-EBJT to 4th place out of six in the Private Owners race.
- 26 May 1929 Desprez Challenge Cup at Filton Aerodrome, Bristol. Whitehead Reid came 2nd in Widgeon II G-EBJT.

=== List of aircraft ===
- G-EAPW Airco DH.6 ex C6503. Registered to Whitehead Reid on 2 December 1919. Some registers report the registration was not taken up, possibly because a Certificate of Airworthiness was not required at the time. Built by Morgan & Co, Leighton Buzzard, Bedfordshire. Fate unknown.
- G-EAFH Avro 504K cn ATC14 ex K-147. Converted by Avro at Hamble to an Avro 548 'Tourist' - a three-seater with a large double cockpit behind the pilot and powered by a Renault 80 hp engine. It was delivered to Whitehead Reid on 31 March 1922. He paid £12 10s (£12.50) for it and converted it to a two-seater with the passenger ahead of the pilot. The doctor sold it in 1928, and it crashed in Southport on 31 May 1935.
- G-EAZT SE5a ex E6013 bought by the doctor on 4 August 1922 from G Wigglesworth. (Note: G Wigglesworth had another aircraft registered in his name, RAF B.E.2c G-EAQR which was apparently also kept at Bekesbourne.) Built by Air Navigation and Engineering Company (ANEC), Addlestone, Surrey and powered by an RAF 1a engine of 108 horsepower (81 kW). It was damaged beyond repair in a taxiing accident at Bekesbourne in the summer of 1923.
- G-EBCA SE5a ex E5956 delivered to Whitehead Reid on 20 August 1923 from G Wigglesworth. Built by ANEC, and powered by a Renault 80hp (60 kW) engine. Withdrawn from use on 24 July 1928.
- G-EBJT Westland Widgeon II. This had been the first prototype of the Widgeon I which was damaged at Lympne trials in 1926. Rebuilt as the Mk.II, it was delivered to Whitehead Reid from the Westland factory at Yeovil by their pilot, Harald Penrose on 5 January 1928. The doctor named the aircraft Wendy after his dog. The aircraft crashed on 19 October 1930 killing the doctor and his passenger (see below).

=== Auxiliary Air Force ===
On 11 May 1926 Whitehead Reid joined 601 (County of London) Bomber (B) Squadron which had been formed on 14 October 1925. This was known as "The Millionaires' Squadron" because at one time there were reported to be six millionaire members. He was promoted to Flying Officer on 12 January 1928, then Flight Lieutenant on 20 November 1928.

The squadron was formed at RAF Northolt, Middlesex on 14 October 1925, moving to RAF Hendon in January 1927. Equipped with the Airco DH.9 and, from November 1929, the Westland Wapiti they specialised in performing exercise bombing raids on London to test their own abilities and those of the defenders. They held annual training summer camps at Lympne.

=== Gliding ===
In the late 1920s Whitehead Reid took an interest in gliding. The Kent Gliding Club was founded on 4 January 1930 and the doctor was a member. Some of the club's activities took place at Bekesbourne aerodrome, and in the same year the doctor became the club's president.

He was also involved with the British Gliding Association (BGA), which was formed on 27 March 1930. With several senior members, including Sir Sefton Brancker, Col. the Master of Sempill, Sir Gilbert Walker, Mr Eric Gordon England and Capt. C.H. Latimer-Needham, he visited the Rhön gliding competition at Wasserkuppe, Germany. This was a hotbed of German aeronautical design and development at the time. Whitehead Reid arrived in his Widgeon on 20 August 1930, leaving for Frankfurt the next day,

The doctor gained his 'A' certificate at the BGA Gliding Meeting at Ditchling Beacon, Sussex, held on 18–19 October 1930. The doctor and his passenger were killed on the return flight to Bekesbourne.

== Death ==
On the afternoon of 19 October 1930, Whitehead Reid was returning in his Westland Widgeon G-EBJT from Shoreham, where he had been attending the BGA meeting at Ditchling Beacon. He was carrying a passenger, Miss Annie Irene Burnside, aged 27, an enthusiastic airwoman. She was the daughter of Annie and Canon Walter Fletcher Burnside who was headmaster of St. Edmund's School, Canterbury.

The weather started to close in, and the doctor undid his harness so that he could see better through the windscreen. At East Sutton Park near Maidstone, he circled the mansion of Mrs Stanley Wilson, and found a field in which to land. As he drew nearer, he realised that it was ploughed, so was unsuitable for landing. He applied full power to go around, and pulled up steeply to avoid trees at the edge of the field; however, a wing hit some branches, tearing it off and causing the aircraft to crash into a further tree. Miss Burnside was killed instantly, and the doctor rendered unconscious, seriously hurt with a fractured skull and other injuries. He was rushed to West Kent Hospital in Maidstone, where he died the following day, never having regained consciousness.

His funeral was held on 24 October at Canterbury Cathedral which was attended by 3,000 people. One of the floral tributes was from Amy Johnson. Miss Burnside's funeral was at Harbledown, near Canterbury, on the same day. Whitehead Reid's sister Kathleen, now Mrs Reginald H Lucas, attended.
