= Line 31 =

Line 31 may refer to:

- Line 19 (Hangzhou Metro), known as Line 31 during planning.
- Line 31 (Beijing Subway)
- Brussels tramway line 31
- Zurich trolleybus line 31, a trolleybus operated between Kienastenwies and Hermetschloo in Zurich, Switzerland
- Line 31 (IndyGo), a bus route operated on U.S. Route 31 in Indianapolis, Indiana, US

== See also ==
- S31 (disambiguation)#Rail and transit, railway lines numbered S31
- S31 (disambiguation)#Roads, roads numbered S31
- 31 (disambiguation)#Transportation, bus routes numbered 31
- List of highways numbered 31
