= Blériot-SPAD S.27 =

S.27
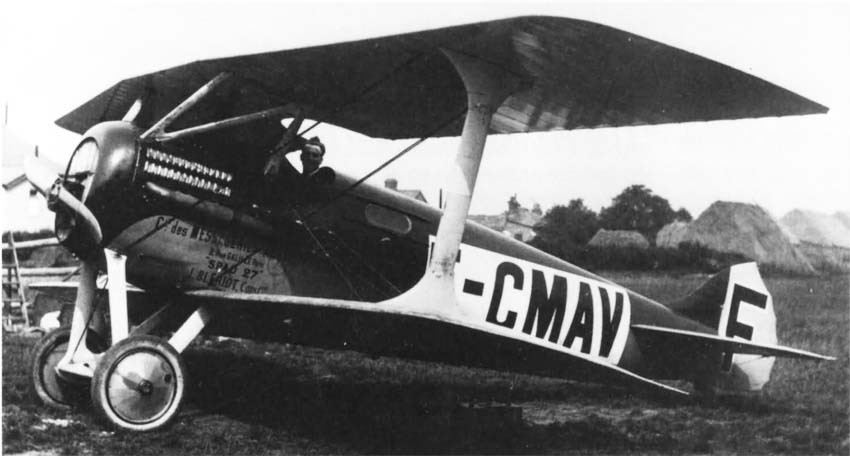

General information
- Type: Airliner
- Manufacturer: Blériot
- Designer: André Herbemont
- Primary user: CMA/Air Union
- Number built: ca. 10

History
- First flight: November 10 1919

The Blériot-SPAD S.27 was a small French airliner developed soon after World War I. It was produced as a way for the Blériot company to find new markets for its wartime products in the postwar market, in this instance by adapting the design of the S.20 fighter into a small airliner. Accommodation for two passengers was provided in a small cabin within the fuselage, but in other respects the S.27 strongly resembled its predecessor.

Three were operated by CMA on its Paris-London route, this total increasing to ten by the time that the company merged into Air Union.

== Operators ==
France

- CMA/Air Union

== Specifications (S.27) ==
Data from European Transport Aircraft since 1910

General characteristics

- Crew: 1
- Capacity: 2 passengers
- Length: 7.3 m (23 ft 11 in)
- Wingspan: 9.72 m (31 ft 11 in)
- Wing area: 30 m^{2} (320 sq ft)
- Empty weight: 850 kg (1,874 lb)
- Gross weight: 1,260 kg (2,778 lb)
- Powerplant: 1 × Hispano-Suiza 8Fa water-cooled V8 engine, 220 kW (300 hp)

Performance

- Maximum speed: 230 km/h (140 mph, 120 kn)
- Endurance: 3 hr

== See also ==
Related development S.XVIII - S.20 - S.26 - S.31
