= S26 =

S26 may refer to:

== Aviation ==
- Blériot-SPAD S.26, a French racing seaplane
- Philippine Air Lines Flight S26, which crashed in 1969
- Short S.26, a British flying boat transport
- Sikorsky S-26, a Russian biplane bomber

== Rail and transit ==
- S26 (Berlin), a line of the Berlin S-Bahn, Germany
- S26 (St. Gallen S-Bahn), an S-Bahn service operating over the Rheineck–Walzenhausen mountain railway line, Switzerland
- S26 (ZVV), a Zurich S-Bahn service operating over the Tösstal Railway line, Switzerland
- S26, an Aargau S-Bahn line, Switzerland
- Konbu Station, in Rankoshi, Isoya District, Hokkaido, Japan

== Roads ==
- Shanghai–Changzhou Expressway, China
- County Route S26 (California), United States
- U.S. Route 1 in New Jersey, partially numbered S26 until 1953

== Submarines ==
- HMS Renown (S26), of the Royal Navy
- INS Vagsheer (S26), of the Indian Navy
- USS S-26 (SS-131), of the United States Navy

== Other uses ==
- 40S ribosomal protein S26
- British NVC community S26, a swamps and tall-herb fens community in the British National Vegetation Classification system
- Djabwurrung language
- S26: In case of contact with eyes, rinse immediately with plenty of water and seek medical advice, a safety phrase
- S26, a postcode district in Sheffield, England
- Samsung Galaxy S26, a smartphone model by Samsung
