= ADC Airdisco =

1920s British piston aircraft engine

Airdisco
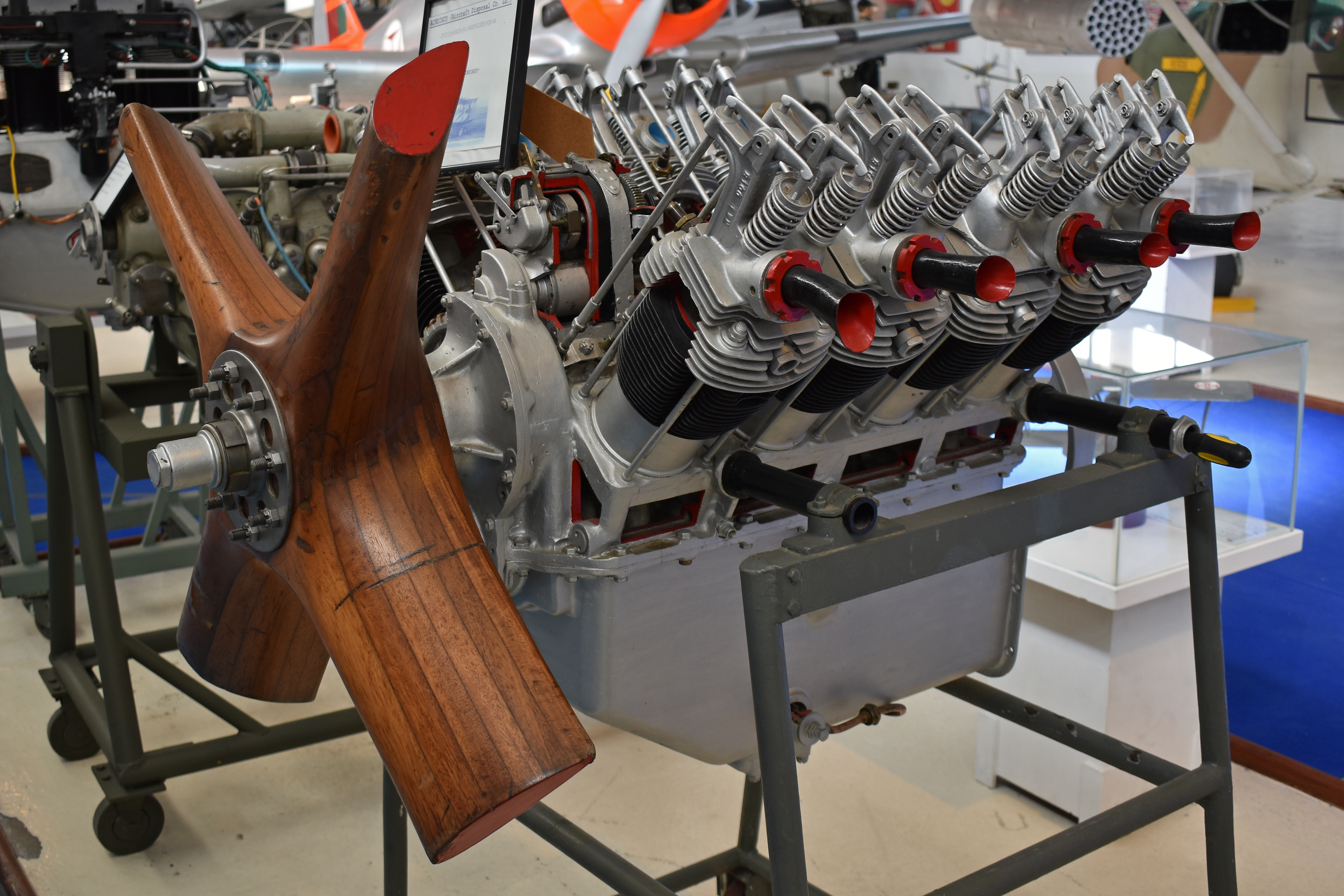
- ADC Airdisco on display at the Museu do Ar
- Type: Air-cooled V8 piston engine
- National origin: United Kingdom
- Manufacturer: Aircraft Disposal Company
- First run: 1925
- Major applications: de Havilland DH.51; Avro 548
- Developed into: ADC Cirrus

The ADC Airdisco is a British V8 aero engine that first ran in 1925.

== Design and development ==
The 'Airdisco' was developed from the Renault 80 hp aero engine by Frank Halford of the Aircraft Disposal Company, the main difference being the use of aluminium cylinder heads. Halford later used one bank of cylinders to create the Cirrus engine.

== Applications ==
- Avro 548A
- Cierva Parnall Gyroplane
- de Havilland DH.51
- Royal Aircraft Factory S.E.5A

== Survivors ==
A de Havilland DH.51 owned and operated by the Shuttleworth Collection at Old Warden, Bedfordshire remains airworthy and is powered by an original ADC Airdisco engine.

== Specifications (Airdisco) ==
Data from Lumsden

=== General characteristics ===
- Type: Air-cooled, upright, V8 piston engine
- Bore: 4.13 in (105 mm)
- Stroke: 5.12 in (130 mm)
- Displacement: 548.94 cu in (9 L)
- Length: 46 in (1,168 mm)
- Width: 21.3 in (541 mm)
- Height: 31.1 in (790 mm)
- Dry weight: lb ( kg)
- Designer: Frank Halford

=== Components ===
- Valvetrain: 1 inlet and 1 exhaust valve per cylinder
- Fuel system: Carburettor
- Fuel type: 74 octane
- Cooling system: Air-cooled
- Reduction gear: 0.5:1, right hand tractor

=== Performance ===
- Power output: 120 hp (89kW) at 1,800 rpm (takeoff power)
- Compression ratio: 4.6:1

== See also ==
Related development

- ADC Cirrus

Related lists

- List of aircraft engines
