= S31 =

S31 may refer to:

== Aviation ==
- Blériot-SPAD S.31, a French racing aircraft
- Letov Š-31, a Czechoslovak fighter aircraft
- Lopez Island Airport, in Washington, United States
- Short S.31, a British bomber prototype
- Sikorsky S-31, an American sesquiplane

== Naval vessels ==
- ARA Salta (S-31), a submarine of the Argentine Navy
- Brazilian submarine Tamoio (S-31)
- HMS Vengeance (S31), a submarine of the Royal Navy
- SMS S31 (1913), a torpedo boat of the Imperial German Navy
- Spanish submarine Almirante García de los Reyes (S31)
- USS S-31 (SS-136), a submarine of the United States Navy

== Rail and transit ==
- S31 (Long Island bus)
- Warabitai Station, a closed station in Oshamambe, Hokkaido, Japan
- S31, a line of the Bern S-Bahn, in Switzerland
- S31, a line of the Hamburg S-Bahn, in Germany
- S31, a line of the Karlsruhe Stadtbahn, in Germany
- S31, a line of the Lucerne S-Bahn, in Switzerland
- S31, a former line of the Zurich S-Bahn, in Switzerland

== Roads ==
- Mehran Highway, in Sindh, Pakistan
- County Route S31 (California), United States
- County Route S31 (Bergen County, New Jersey), United States
- U.S. Route 206, partially numbered New Jersey Route S31 until 1953

== Other uses ==
- Sulfur-31, an isotope of sulfur
