= Compagnie des Messageries Aériennes =

French airline (1919–1923)

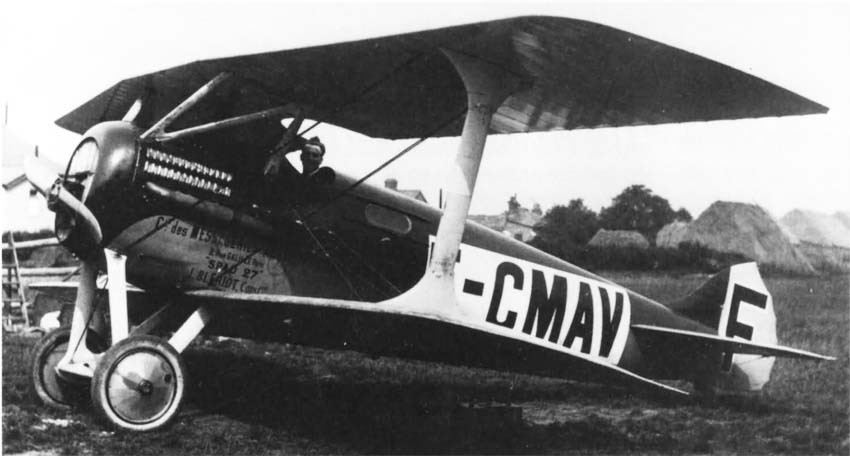
- Blériot-SPAD S.27
IATA	ICAO	Call sign
N/A	N/A	N/A
- Founded: February 1919
- Commenced operations: 18 April 1919
- Ceased operations: 1 January 1923
- Operating bases: Le Bourget Airport, Paris, France
- Destinations: Brussels, Belgium; Lille-Lesquin Airport, Lille, France; Hounslow Heath Aerodrome, Middlesex, United Kingdom
- Key people: Founders: Louis Blériot; Louis Charles Breguet; René Caudron; Louis Renault

Compagnie des messageries aériennes was a pioneering French airline which was in operation from 1919–23, when it was merged with Grands Express Aériens to form Air Union.

== History ==
Compagnie des messageries aériennes was established February 1919 by Louis Charles Breguet, Louis Blériot, Louis Renault and René Caudron. The first commercial route, a mail and freight service between Le Bourget Airport, Paris and Lille-Lesquin Airport, Lille, was started 18 April 1919 using ex-military Breguet 14s. In August, a service was started to Brussels. On 19 September, an international passenger service between Paris - Le Bourget Airport and London (Hounslow Heath Aerodrome) was started, also using Breguet 14s.

CMA absorbed Compagnie générale transaérienne (CGT) in 1921 so that it could add postal service to its offerings.

The company was merged with Grands Express Aériens to form Air Union on 1 January 1923.

== Accidents and incidents ==
- On 23 June 1921, a Blériot-SPAD S.27, F-CMAY of CMA was en route from Croydon to Le Bourget. It encountered technical problems and attempted a forced landing, possibly aiming for Bekesbourne Aerodrome, Kent, but crashed onto an adjacent railway line, first hitting telegraph cables which would have softened the impact. The two passengers were unharmed, while the pilot received minor injuries having been pinned underneath the aircraft. The aircraft was written off.
- On 3 June 1922, CMA's Blériot-SPAD S.33 F-ACMH en route from Croydon to Le Bourget crashed into the English Channel off Folkestone, killing both passengers and the pilot.
- On 15 March 1923, Farman F.60 Goliath F-AEIE overran the runway on landing at Croydon and collided with a building. The aircraft was later repaired and returned to service.
- On 3 December 1923, Goliath F-AEIF, which may have been operated by CMA, crashed at Littlestone, Kent.

== Fleet ==
- Breguet 14 (2 passengers)
- Farman F.60 Goliath (12 passengers, 15 aircraft)
- Blériot-SPAD S.27 (2 passengers, 10 aircraft)
- Blériot-SPAD S.33 (5 passengers, 15 aircraft)

== See also ==
- List of airlines by foundation date
