= SPAD S.XX =

French WW1 fighter aircraft

S.20
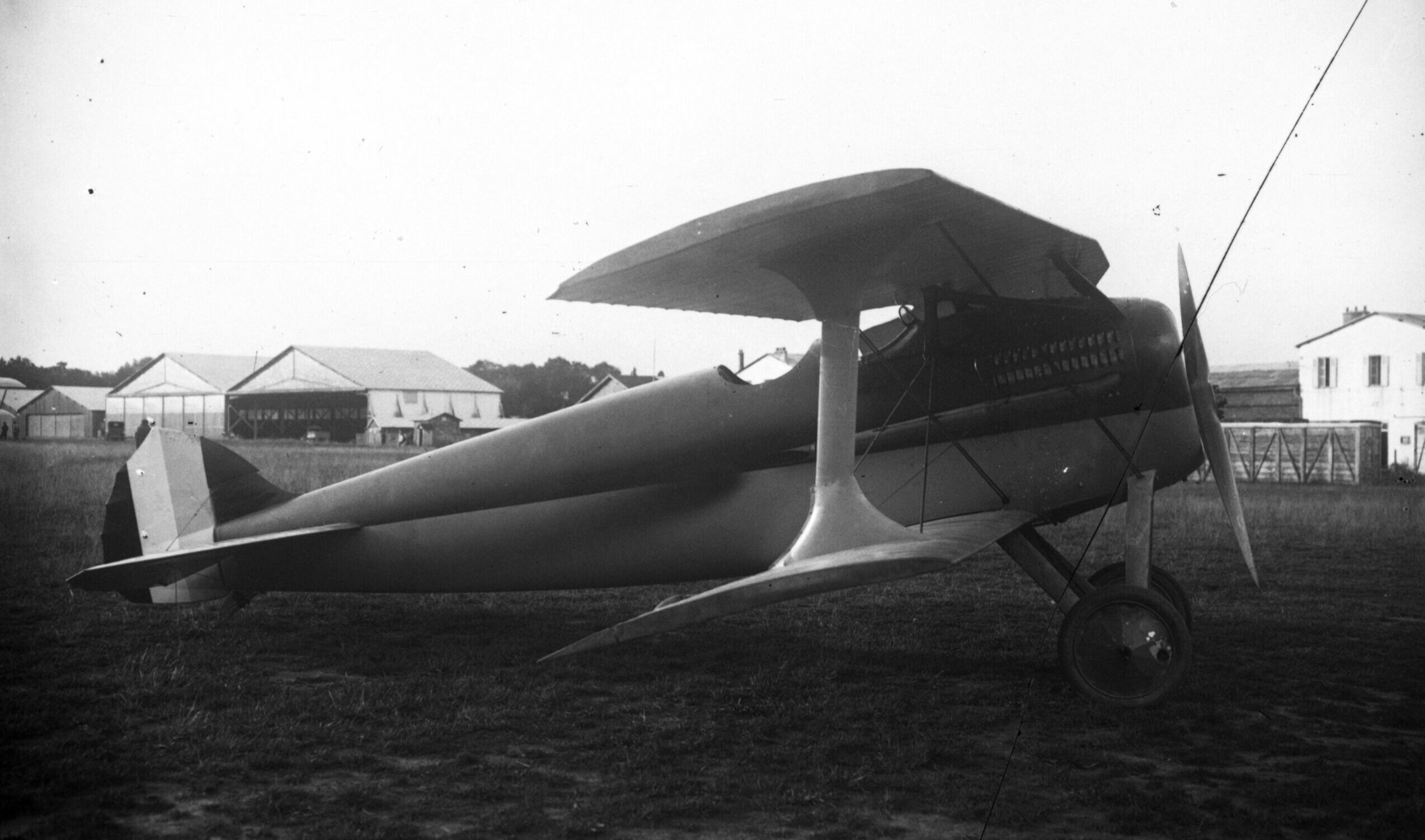

General information
- Type: Fighter
- Manufacturer: Blériot
- Designer: André Herbemont
- Primary user: Aéronautique Militaire
- Number built: ca. 100

History
- Introduction date: October 1920
- First flight: August 7 1918

The Blériot-SPAD S.20 (originally known as the SPAD S.XX) was a French fighter aircraft developed near the end of World War I. Too late to serve in the war, almost 100 of these aircraft equipped the French Air Force in the years immediately following. These agile aircraft were also used successfully for air racing and record-setting.

== Design and development ==
The S.XX was a refinement of the S.XVIII and was a two-seat fighter biplane which carried a pilot and tail gunner. The design was conventional but featured an upper wing with a pronounced sweep-back. This was joined to the lower wing by large I-struts. Like its predecessor, the S.XX became known colloquially as the "Herbemont", after its designer. Originally the French government issued an open-ended contract for these aircraft at the rate of 300 per month. However, this was cancelled at the Armistice, before any aircraft had been delivered. The order was later revived to obtain a modern fighter for France's post-war air force, and 95 were purchased. Additionally, the Japanese Mitsubishi company bought three examples, and the government of Bolivia bought one.

In 1918, a S.XX set the world airspeed record for a two-seat aircraft, with a speed of 230 km/h (143 mph), and in July 1919 Joseph Sadi-Lecointe set an altitude record of 8,900 m (29,200 ft) in one. This was the beginning of a prodigious streak of records set by a series of refined S.20s with increasingly shorter wingspans. Before the year was over, Sadi-Lecointe set two new speed records for the S.20's class: 249 km/h (155 mph) in September, and 252 km/h (157 mph) in October, as well as winning the Prix Henri Deutsch de la Meurthe competition five days earlier.

1920 saw S.20s used to break records not only in their own class, but the world absolute airspeed record three times over. On February 28, Jean Casale reached 283 km/h (176 mph), but this was soon broken twice by Bernard de Romanet, first on October 9 with a speed of 292 km/h (182 mph), and then on November 4 at 309 km/h (193 mph). The same year, the two S.20bis-5s competed in the Gordon Bennett Cup. One, piloted by Casale, was disqualified, but the other, piloted by de Romanet, was placed second.

== Variants ==
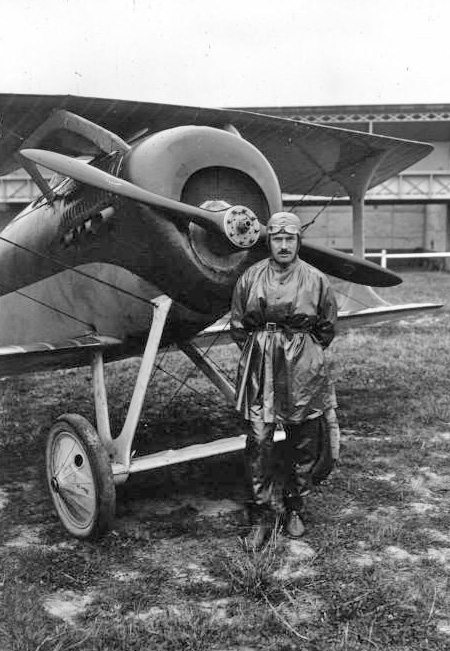
de Romanet standing in front of one of the S.20bis racers

- S.XX - original military production version (95 built in series)
- S.XX bis - improved military version (2 built) with larger wings and tail. One sold to Mitsubishi
- S.20 bis-1 - racer
- S.20 bis-2 - racer with shortened wingspan
- S.20 bis-3 - racer with further shortened wingspan
- S.20 bis-4 - racer with even further shortened wingspan
- S.20 bis-5 - racer for Gordon Bennett cup (2 built). Radically modified wing design - upper wing changed to gull configuration.
- S.20 bis-6 - racer with shortened cabane struts and custom-built Hispano-Suiza engine

== Operators ==
Bolivia

- Bolivian Air Force - biplaza artillado, 1921

France

- Aéronautique Militaire
  - 2ème Régiment d'Aviation

Paraguay

- Paraguayan Air Arm - One S.XX was used in the Revolution of 1922.
  - Paraguayan Military Aviation School - The 1922 Revolution survivor was used as a fighter trainer in the Military Aviation School. Wfu in 1925.

== Specifications (S.XX) ==
General characteristics

- Crew: two, pilot and gunner
- Length: 7.30 m (23 ft 11 in)
- Wingspan: 9.72 m (31 ft 11 in)
- Height: 2.80 m (9 ft 2 in)
- Wing area: 30.0 m^{2} (323 sq ft)
- Empty weight: 867 kg (1,911 lb)
- Gross weight: 1,306 kg (2,879 lb)
- Powerplant: 1 × Hispano-Suiza 8Fb inline engine , 224 kW (300 hp)

Performance

- Maximum speed: 217 km/h (135 mph, 117 kn)
- Range: 400 km (250 mi, 220 nmi)
- Service ceiling: 8,000 m (26,240 ft)
- Rate of climb: 5.6 m/s (1,100 ft/min)

Armament

- 2 × fixed, forward-firing .303 Vickers machine guns
- 1 × trainable, rearward-firing .303 Lewis gun

== See also ==
Related development

- Blériot-SPAD S.27

== Bibliography ==
- Bruner, Georges (1977). "Fighters a la Francaise, Part One". Air Enthusiast (3): 85–95. ISSN 0143-5450.
- Sapienza, Antonio Luis (April 1999). "Le role de aviation lors de la révolution de 1922 au Paraguay" [The Role of Aircraft during the 1922 Paraguayan Revolution]. Avions: Toute l'aéronautique et son histoire (in French) (73): 24–26. ISSN 1243-8650.
- Taylor, Michael J. H. (1989). Jane's Encyclopedia of Aviation. London: Studio Editions. p. 163.
- EADS website
- aviafrance.com
- Hirschauer, Louis; Dollfus, Charles, eds. (1920). L'Année Aéronautique: 1919-1920. Paris: Dunod. p. 9.
- Hirschauer, Louis; Dollfus, Charles, eds. (1921). L'Année Aéronautique: 1920-1921. Paris: Dunod. p. 15.
