= Binker Golding =

British saxophonist (born 1985)

- Born: 1985 (age 40–41)
- Education: Middlesex University
- Occupation: Jazz musician
- Website: binkergolding.com

Binker Golding (born 1985) is a British jazz musician, who has released solo albums on Gearbox Records and is one half of the MOBO award-winning jazz duo Binker and Moses.

Golding was born in 1985 and comes from Enfield, London, and went to Middlesex University, obtaining a Bachelor of Arts degree in Jazz in 2007. He is a former member of Tomorrow's Warriors.

== Discography ==
=== Solo work ===
- Abstractions of Reality Past and Incredible Feathers (2019, Gearbox)
- Moon Day (2021, Byrd Out)
- Dream Like A Dogwood Wild Boy (2022, Gearbox)

=== With Binker and Moses ===
- Dem Ones (2015, Gearbox)
- Journey To The Mountain Of Forever (2017, Gearbox)
- Alive in the East? (2018, Gearbox)
- Escape the Flames (2020, Gearbox)
- Feeding The Machine (2022, Gearbox)

=== With Charles Tolliver ===
- Connect (2020, Gearbox)
