= Connect (Charles Tolliver album) =

Studio album by Charles Tolliver
- Released: 2020
- Recorded: November 2019
- Studio: RAK Studios, London
- Genre: Jazz
- Length: 39:25
- Label: Gearbox; GB1561
- Producer: Darrel Sheinman

Charles Tolliver chronology
Emperor March: Live at the Blue Note (2009)	Connect (2020)

Connect is an album by trumpeter and composer Charles Tolliver. Arriving over a decade after 2009's Emperor March: Live at the Blue Note, it was recorded during November 2019 at RAK Studios in London, and was issued on CD, vinyl, and via digital download in 2020 by Gearbox Records, Tolliver's first release as a leader for the label. On the album, Tolliver is joined by saxophonists Jesse Davis and Binker Golding, pianist Keith Brown, double bassist Buster Williams, and drummer Lenny White.

== Reception ==
Professional ratings
Review scores
Source	Rating
All About Jazz	4.5/5 stars
AllMusic	4/5 stars
DownBeat	3/5 stars
Jazz Journal	3.5/5 stars
Jazzwise	4/5 stars
Tom Hull – on the Web	B+

Giovanni Russonello of The New York Times stated that the album "stands out in large part based on the quality of [Tolliver's] compositions," which "tend to balance syncopated elements as if they were structural beams." He wrote: "The drums, the piano and bass, the horns: Each scribbles out its own pattern, contrasting with the others and occasionally uniting."

DownBeat's John Murph praised the album's "rugged amalgam of hard-bop swagger, backbeat funk and steely Afrocentric sense of determination," and stated that Tolliver's playing "reveals a weathered beauty that best can be compared to the emotive prowess of singers like Jimmy Scott or Sarah Vaughan in their latter years."

In a review for AllMusic, Matt Collar called Connect "an intimate, intensely expressive album that works as a dynamic counterpoint to [Tolliver's] large-ensemble productions," and noted that it is the presence of a "kind of rousing group aesthetic and unified intensity that makes Connect such a vital small-group companion to Tolliver's big-band work."

Writing for Jazzwise, Kevin Le Gendre described the album as "a fine consolidation of the vocabulary the trumpeter has devised over five decades, which is a deeply touching take on hard bop and modal jazz whereby the themes are soulfully yearning." He commented: "At the age of 78, Tolliver has deserved elder statesman status, and this is the kind of cultured work, with intellect and emotion in symbiosis, that befits an artist who has contributed a great deal to modern music during a lengthy, eventful career."

Derek Ansell of Jazz Journal remarked: "As an example of contemporary jazz in the classic tradition from the 40s onwards, this is a sterling session, original, well played and extremely well recorded."

Commenting for London Jazz News, Adam Sieff called the album "a blast," and wrote: "the energy everyone creates here is incredible. I haven't been able to stop listening to this, it's some of the most exciting and vital music I've heard for some time. Great tunes, fantastic playing, beautifully recorded."

In an article for All About Jazz, Chris May stated: "the album finds Tolliver still at the top of his game in a recording career which began in the mid 1960s... The lineup... is a killer combination... He chooses his projects with care and his quality control is spot on. So the release of Connect... is doubly welcome."

Bill Hart of The Vinyl Press commented: " If you don't get hooked by the first track, I'd urge you to pick another genre—this is modern jazz at its best. It's accessible, well played and beautifully recorded."

Jazz Trail's Filipe Freitas remarked: "Spreading sheer joy while demonstrating athleticism, the group members show an innate, nearly telepathic way of communication... Tolliver knows he doesn't need ultra-modern aesthetics to make his music sound beautifully. With tremendous breadth and maturity, this is an album where we can reconnect with his music and rediscover his singular points of view."

== Track listing ==
Composed by Charles Tolliver.

1. "Blue Soul" – 9:38
2. "Emperor March" – 13:32
3. "Copasetic" – 6:07
4. "Suspicion" – 9:59
5. "Blue Soul (edit)" – 6:07 (bonus track on digital download)

== Personnel ==
- Charles Tolliver – trumpet
- Jesse Davis – alto saxophone
- Binker Golding – tenor saxophone (tracks 3 and 4)
- Keith Brown – piano
- Buster Williams – double bass
- Lenny White – drums
