= K. K. Brown =

British aviator (1901–1939)

- Born: 1 July 1901; South Yarra, Victoria, Australia
- Died: 21 July 1939 (aged 38); Tilmanstone, Kent, England
- Spouse: Gwendolyn Stanbury (m. 1930; died 1939)
- Military career
- Branch: Royal Air Force
- Service years: 1927–1939

Keith Kendle Brown (1 July 1901 – 21 July 1939) was a British aviator. He served as a flight instructor, aerobatic pilot, and officer in the Royal Air Force until his death in 1939 in an aircraft collision over Tilmanstone.

Brown was born on 1 July 1901 in South Yarra, Australia. He married Gwendolyn Stanbury in 1930.

== Career ==
Brown was commissioned as a flying officer into the Royal Air Force on 13 November 1927. He was appointed the chief instructor at the Cinque Ports Flying Club, Lympne, the instructor of the Nottingham Aero Club, and then made chief instructor of the Kent Flying Club, by which point he was "a very experienced pilot".

In 1929, Brown flew to the Hythe Venetian Fete, with R. H. Wynne as Bomber, for the purpose of bombing a castle or raft. The Flight International reported:

As a bombing expedition it was not very successful, only one hit being secured, but as an exhibition of flying, the show was absolutely first class, and it was chiefly due to the terrific speed of Mr. Brown’s dives, that Mr. Wynne was unable to gauge the right moment to release the bombs. We congratulate Mr. Brown on a very fine performance.

In 1931, Brown bore witness to the aeroplane crash at Newingreen, Kent and the death of pilot Nigel Benjamin Cohen, son and heir of Sir Herbert Benjamin Cohen, 2nd baronet. When diving from a height of about 4,000 feet, he observed first that a wing fell from the machine and then that it crashed, missing the New Inn by only a few feet and crashing near the wall at the back of the hotel. He was quickly on the scene and observed that the engine seemed to be running perfectly. He considered that the crash was due to the excessive strain upon the structure of the machine owing to its big dive.

Brown was one of a small number of people who gathered to see Bill Lancaster's Final flight as he departed England on 11 April 1933. At the 1933 Cinque Ports Wakefield Cup Race, Brown "flew in the craziest manner possible in the Avro 504 (Bristol Lucifer)." In 1934, he flew Ken Waller's 1912 Caudron. Among his students was actress Jeanne de Casalis. In August 1936, he flew at Lympne for the Cinque Ports Club International Rally and 1936 Wakefield Cup Race.

== Death and aftermath ==
On 21 July 1939, a Hawker Hind K5418 of Oxford University Air Squadron was destroyed in a mid-air collision with a de Havilland DH.60 Moth G-ABJZ of Kent Flying Club over a cornfield adjoining Beeches Wood, Tilmanstone, near Deal, Kent. Brown and two others were killed instantly (his pupil, Donovon William Alan Pragnell, of St. Martin's, Stodmarsh Road, Canterbury and Pilot officer David Curig Lewis RAFVR, of Porthkerry, near Barry, Glamorgan, sole occupant of the Hind). The Hind was on a map-reading exercise between Dover and Dymchurch when its tail was struck from above and behind by the Moth, which landed 200 yards (180 m) from its engine and was damaged beyond repair. The Hind's pilot landed about 20 yards (18 m) from his aircraft, while the tail fell in a cornfield about 50 yards (46 m) beyond the Moth.

A. K. Mowll, Deputy East Kent Coroner, opened the inquest at Eastry Institution on 22 July 1939. The Dover Express reported that Brown was "a man of very considerable experience" and that "of what flying experience Lewis had he (the Coroner) had at the moment no information." Alexander Robert Ramsay, of Woodlands Cottage, Adisham, Manager of Air Sales and Service, Ltd., proprietors of the Kent Flying Club, Bekesbourne, identified the bodies of Brown and Pragnell. He had seen the aeroplane go up at approximately 11.30. Frederick Lionel Benbow Hebbert, Wing Commander, Royal Air Force, stationed at Lympne Airport, identified the body of Lewis.

Dr. D. M. M. Fraser, of Eastry, said he examined the three bodies at 16:30 on the day of their deaths at the Eastry Mortuary. He observed that "the principle injury to Brown was a fracture of the base of the skull and there were multiple other injuries, consistent with having fallen from a height, but not a relatively great height, perhaps 200 feet or 300 feet. The cause of death was the fracture of the base of the skull."
