= Keith Brown (footballer, born 1954) =

English footballer

Personal information
- Full name: Keith Brown
- Date of birth: 23 September 1954 (age 72)
- Place of birth: Grimsby, England
- Position: Winger

Senior career*
Years	Team	Apps	(Gls)
1972–1973	Nottingham Forest	0	(0)
1973–1976	Grimsby Town	39	(5)
1976–19??	Louth United		
- * Club domestic league appearances and goals

Keith Brown (born 23 September 1954) is an English professional footballer who played as a winger.
