= De Havilland DH.51 =

DH.51
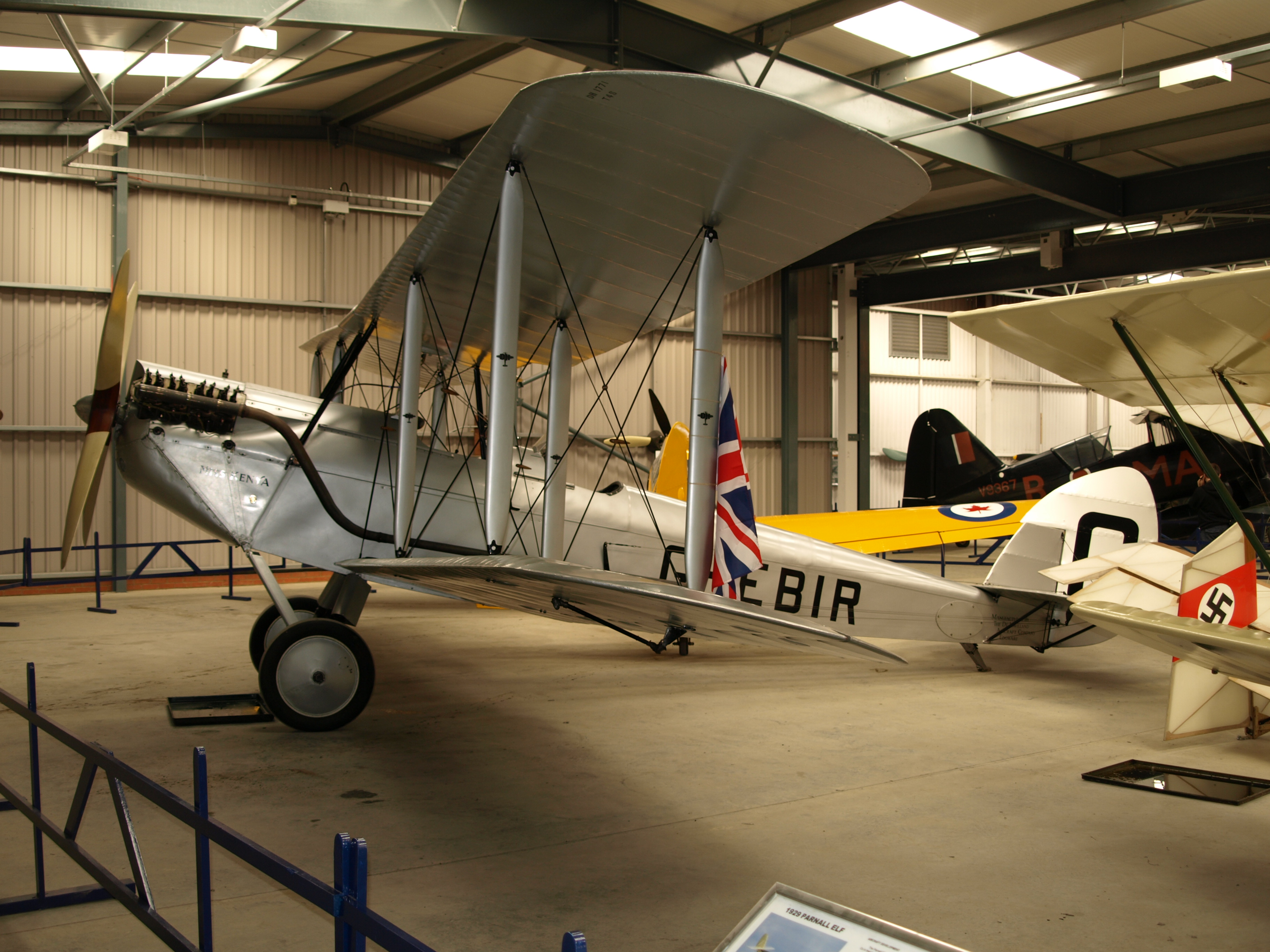
- The sole remaining airworthy DH.51, G-EBIR, at the Shuttleworth Collection

General information
- Type: Touring biplane
- Manufacturer: de Havilland
- Number built: 3

History
- First flight: 1924

The de Havilland DH.51 is a 1920s British three-seat touring biplane built by de Havilland at Stag Lane Aerodrome, Edgware.

== Design and development ==
De Havilland designed the DH.51 as an economical touring biplane, based on the 90 hp (67 kW) RAF 1A engine which was available from war-surplus stocks. The aircraft first flew in July 1924; it performed well but because it did not have a dual-ignition system it was refused a certificate of airworthiness. As it would have taken at least ten hours of flight testing to certify it with a single-ignition system, de Havilland decided to re-engine the aircraft instead. The aircraft was fitted with an ADC Airdisco Air-cooled V8 piston engine, which considerably improved performance but was no longer cheap to operate. As a result, only three aircraft were built. The first aircraft was fitted with single-bay wings and was designated the DH.51A. It was exported to Australia and later converted to a floatplane as the DH.51B.

== Operational service ==
The first aircraft was exported to Australia in 1927, as a floatplane it capsized in Sydney Harbour in January 1931. The second aircraft remained in the UK until it was scrapped in 1933. A third and final aircraft was built in 1925 and exported to Kenya in 1929, having the honour of being the first aircraft on the Kenyan civil register as VP-KAA. After 40 years of service it returned by air freight to the UK in 1965 where it was restored by Hawker-Siddeley Aviation at Hawarden. It was then put on the UK register as G-EBIR and passed to The Shuttleworth Collection in Bedfordshire where it remains in an airworthy condition to this day.

== Surviving aircraft ==
The third aircraft (registered G-EBIR and named Miss Kenya; built in 1925) remains airworthy with the Shuttleworth Collection, Old Warden, England and can be seen at flying events throughout the summer months. It is still powered by an Airdisco (Renault) 120hp V-8 engine driving a fixed pitch 4-bladed wooden propeller.

== Specifications (DH.51 Airdisco engine) ==
Data from De Havilland Aircraft since 1909

General characteristics

- Crew: 1
- Capacity: 2 passengers
- Length: 26 ft 6 in (8.08 m)
- Wingspan: 37 ft 0 in (11.28 m)
- Height: 9 ft 9 in (2.97 m)
- Wing area: 325 sq ft (30.2 m^{2})
- Empty weight: 1,342 lb (609 kg)
- Gross weight: 2,240 lb (1,016 kg)
- Powerplant: 1 × ADC Airdisco V-8 air-cooled piston engine, 120 hp (89 kW)
- Propellers: 4-bladed fixed-pitch

Performance

- Maximum speed: 108 mph (174 km/h, 94 kn)
- Stall speed: 43 mph (69 km/h, 37 kn)
- Service ceiling: 15,000 ft (4,600 m)
- Rate of climb: 960 ft/min (4.9 m/s)

== See also ==
- List of de Havilland aircraft
