= De Havilland DH.60 Moth =

1925 utility aircraft family

DH.60 Moth, Cirrus Moth, Genet Moth, Gipsy Moth, and Moth Major
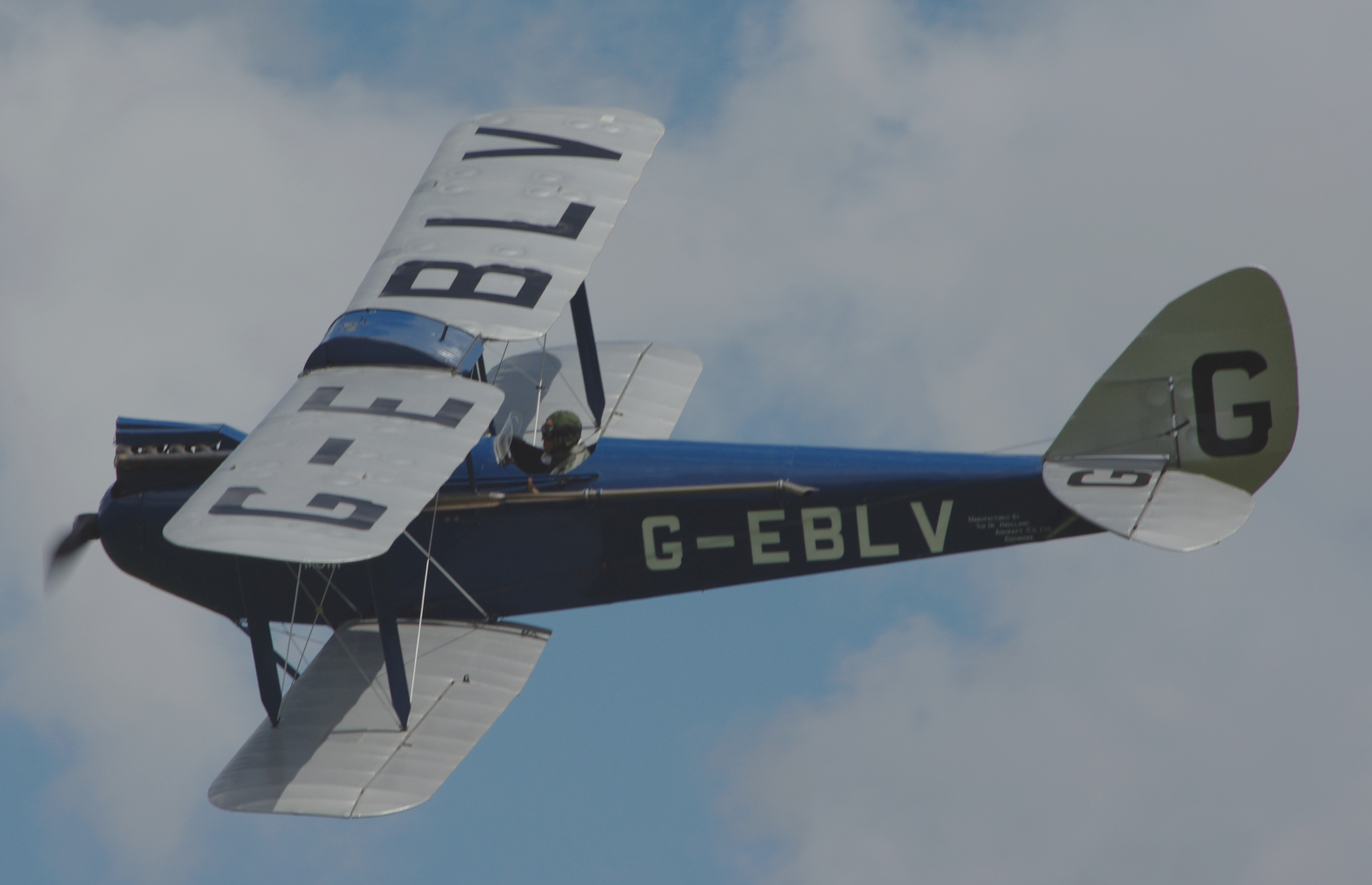
- BAe Systems' DH.60 Cirrus III Moth, based at The Shuttleworth Collection, Old Warden. It was the eighth DH.60 produced, delivered 29 August 1925 and retains the early single axle.

General information
- Type: Trainer
- Manufacturer: de Havilland Aircraft Company
- Designer: Geoffrey de Havilland
- Number built: 1,535

History
- First flight: 22 February 1925 (DH.60 Cirrus Moth)
- Developed from: de Havilland DH.51
- Developed into: de Havilland Tiger Moth

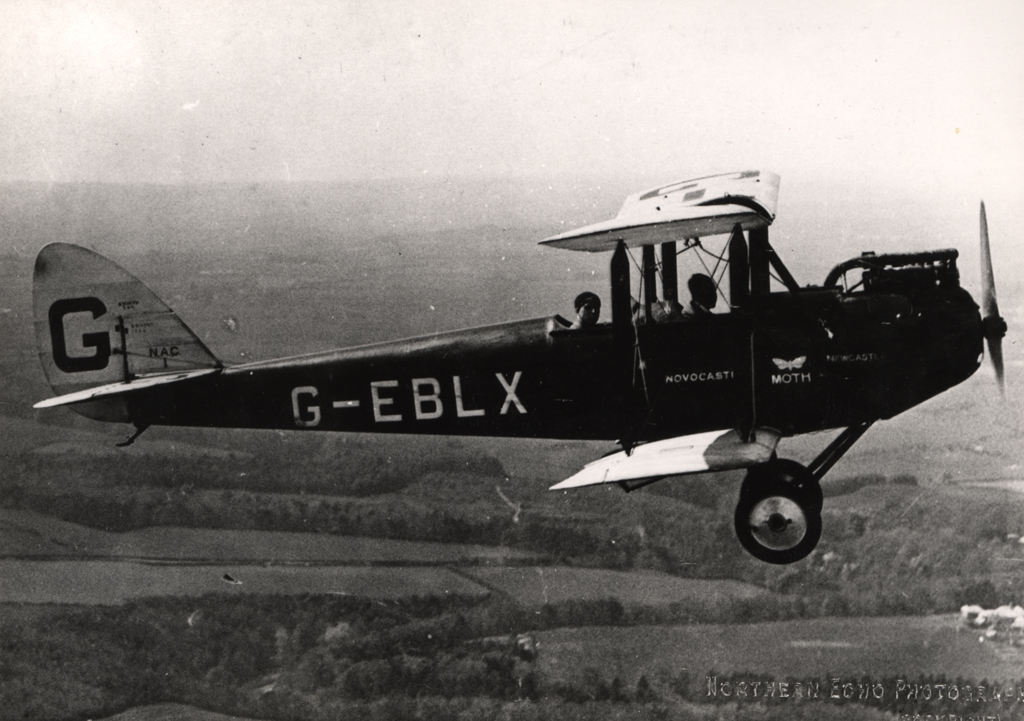
Cirrus 1 Moth G-EBLX Novocastria of the Newcastle upon Tyne Aero Club, 1925

The de Havilland DH.60 Moth is a 1920s British two-seat touring and training aircraft that was developed into a series of aircraft by the de Havilland Aircraft Company.

== Development ==
The DH.60 was developed from the larger DH.51 biplane. The first flight of the ADC Cirrus-powered prototype DH.60 Moth (registration G-EBKT) was carried out by Geoffrey de Havilland at the works airfield at Stag Lane on 22 February 1925. The Moth was a two-seat biplane of wooden construction, it had a plywood covered fuselage and fabric covered surfaces, a standard tailplane with a single tailplane and fin. A useful feature of the design was its folding wings which allowed owners to hangar the aircraft in much smaller spaces. The then Secretary of State for Air Sir Samuel Hoare became interested in the aircraft and the Air Ministry subsidised five flying clubs and equipped them with Moths.

The prototype was modified with a horn-balanced rudder, as used on the production aircraft, and was entered into the 1925 King's Cup Race flown by Alan Cobham. Deliveries commenced to flying schools in England. One of the early aircraft was fitted with an all-metal twin-float landing gear to become the first Moth seaplane. The original production Moths were later known as Cirrus I Moths.

Three aircraft were modified for the 1927 King's Cup Race with internal modifications and a Cirrus II engine on a lowered engine mounting. The original designation of DH.60X (for experimental purposes) was soon changed to Cirrus II Moth; the DH.60X designation was re-used in 1928 for the Gipsy I powered version with a split axle. The production run for the DH.60X Cirrus Moth was replaced by later Gipsy powered variants, but it was still available to special order.

=== Gipsy engine ===
Although the Cirrus engine was reliable, its manufacture was not. It depended on components from surplus World War I 8-cylinder Renault engines and therefore numbers were limited by the stockpile of surplus Renaults. de Havilland therefore decided to replace the Cirrus with a new engine designed by Frank Halford to be built by his own factory. In 1928, when the new de Havilland Gipsy I engine became available, a company-owned DH.60 Moth G-EBQH was re-engined to become the prototype DH.60G Gipsy Moth.

Next to the increase in power, the main advantage of this update was that the Gipsy was a completely new engine available in as great a number as the manufacture of Moths necessitated. The new Gipsy engines could simply be built in-house on a production-line side by side with the Moth airframes. This also enabled de Havilland to control the complete process of building a Moth airframe, engine and all, streamline productivity and in the end lower manufacturing costs. While the original DH.60 was offered for a relatively modest £650, by 1930 the price of a new Gipsy-powered Moth was still £650, in spite of its improved engine.

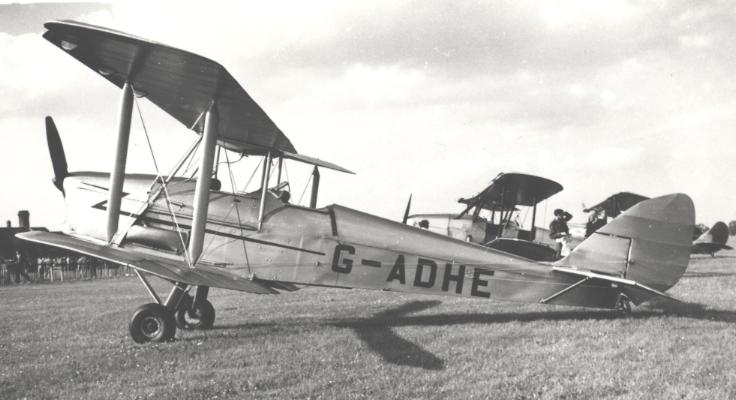
DH.60G-III Moth Major G-ADHE at Coventry in June 1954

A metal-fuselage version of the Gipsy Moth was designated the DH.60M Moth and was originally developed for overseas customers, particularly Canada. The DH.60M was also licence-built in Australia, Canada, the United States and Norway. Also in 1931 a variant of the DH.60M was marketed for military training as the DH.60T Moth Trainer.

In 1931, following the upgrade of the Gipsy engine to become the Gipsy II, de Havilland inverted the engine and re-designated it the Gipsy III. This engine was fitted into a Moth aircraft, which was re-designated the DH.60G-III Moth Major. This sub-type was intended for the military trainer market and some of the first aircraft were supplied to the Swedish Air Force.

The DH.60T Moth was re-engined with the Gipsy III and was initially re-designated the DH.60T Tiger Moth. The DH.60T Tiger Moth was further modified with swept back mainplanes and the cabane struts were moved forward to improve egress from the front cockpit in case of emergency. The changes were great enough that the aircraft was again re-designated, becoming the DH.82 Tiger Moth.

== Design ==
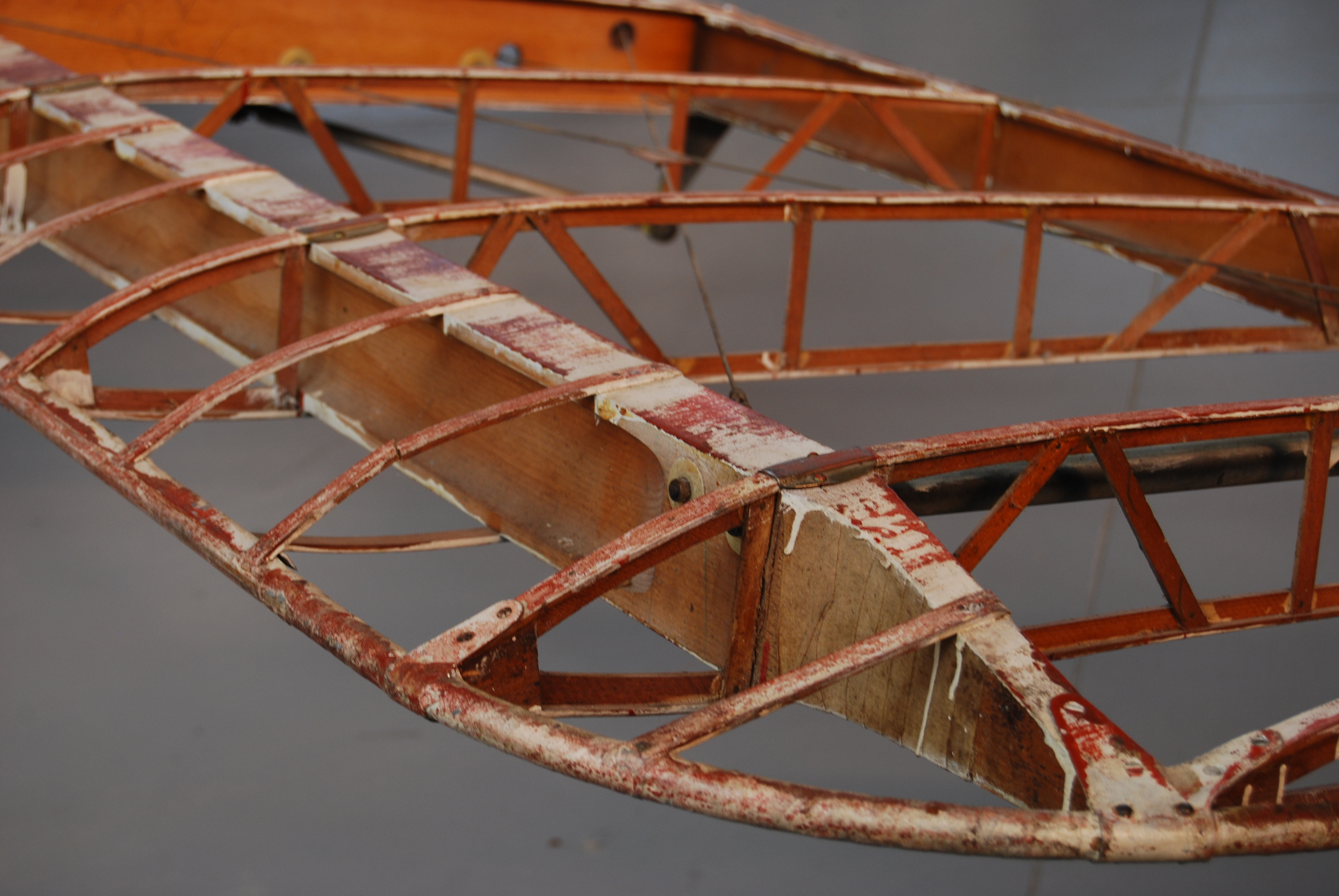
Lower port wing internal structure

Apart from the engine, the new Gipsy Moth was a standard DH.60. Except for changes to accommodate the engine the fuselage remained the same, the exhaust still ran alongside the left side of the cockpits and the logo on the right side still read 'De Havilland Moth'. The fuel tank was still housed in the bulging airfoil that formed the centre section of the upper wing. The wings could still be folded alongside the fuselage and still had de Havilland's patented differential ailerons on the bottom mainplanes and no ailerons on the top ones. Colour options still remained as simple as before: wings and tail in "Moth silver", fuselage in the colour the buyer chose.

== Operational history ==
As there was no real comparison between the original DH.60 and the new DH.60G, the Gipsy Moth quickly became the mainstay of British flying clubs as the only real recreational aircraft in the UK. By 1929 it was estimated that of every 100 aeroplanes in Britain, 85 were Moths of one type or another, most of them Gipsy Moths. This was in spite of the fact that with de Havilland having switched from the Cirrus engine to its own Gipsy engine, surplus Cirruses were now pouring into the market and a trove of Cirrus-powered aircraft like the Avro Avian, the Klemm Swallow, and the Miles Hawk started fighting for the flying club and private market.

Although replaced in production by the DH.82 Tiger Moth, the Gipsy Moth remained the mainstay of the British flying scene up to the start of WWII. The war however marked the end of the Gipsy Moth and post-war it was quickly replaced by ex-RAF Tiger Moths pouring into the civilian market.

=== DH.60 Moth in flying clubs ===
The DH.60 arrived at the right spot at the right time. Next to the Moth's maiden flight, 1925 also marked the birth of the first five Royal Aero Club flying schools and clubs and with its simplicity and performance, the Moth was the aircraft of choice to equip the clubs. De Havilland then used this income to concentrate on developing the Moth further into a mass-produced, mass-market aircraft. The Moth made the aero clubs at least just as much as the aero clubs made the Moth. The Moth remained the mainstay of the clubs even long after more modern aircraft became available.

With de Havilland's habit of painting the wings and tailplane of the Moth in silver also came the clubs' habit of distinguishing their aircraft by painting their fuselage in one distinctive club colour. Aircraft of the London Aero Club had a yellow fuselage (plus yellow struts and wheel caps); those of Newcastle a red one. Green stood for the Midlands and blue for Lancashire. Registration letters were black on the wings and, depending on the club colour, either black or white on the fuselage.

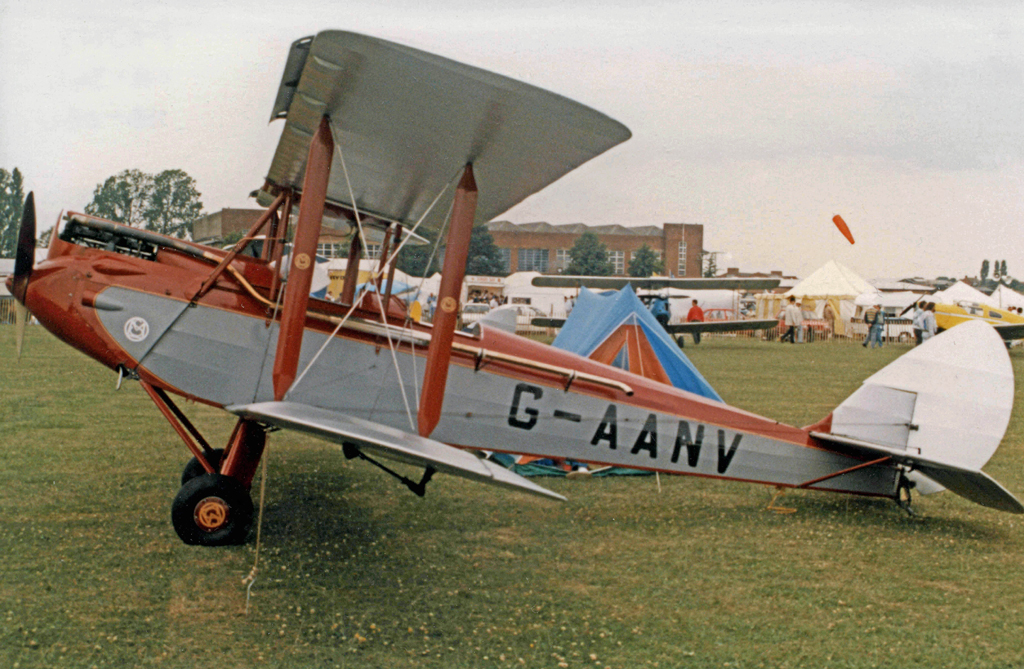
DH.60 Moth built in 1931 in France under licence by Morane-Saulnier

As the Royal Aero Club marketed the idea of flying clubs to other members of the Commonwealth, the de Havilland Aircraft Company followed suit and soon established subsidiaries in Australia and Canada to supply the local flying clubs with Gipsy Moths. Canadian Moths were offered with a detachable canopy for winter flying. Other factories to licence-build the Gipsy Moth were the Larkin Aircraft Supply Company in Australia (which built 32 DH60 Cirrus Moths for the RAAF), the Munitions Supply Board built 6 DH60M's and Commonwealth Dockyards (Codock) built 1 DH60G also for the RAAF, while Genairco built 3 DH60X, and de Havillands own factory in Australia locally built 7 DH60G Gipsy Moths.

Other manufacturers of the DH60 were Morane-Saulnier in France (40 built), the Moth Aircraft Corporation in the U.S. (18 DH60G built and 161 DH60M built). A further 40 built were by de Havilland Canada and 10 built by the Norwegian Army Aircraft Factory in Norway.

(Note that the General Aircraft Company, (Genairco) in Australia, after overhauling and repairing 6 DH60 Cirrus Moths for the RAAF and then building 3 local examples of the DH60X Cirrus II Moth, also went on to design and build their own derivative "Aussie Moth" biplane. This Genairco design was strongly influenced and based on the DH60 fuselage layout but with intended improvements including a wider fuselage able to seat 2 in the front cockpit, deeper cockpit doors and with a different wing and rudder profile. While initially called a "Genairco Moth" and now more correctly called a "Genairco Biplane", these later 9 aircraft (with 2 built as cabin biplanes) are not variants of the DH60 Moth despite some DH production lists including them.)

=== DH.60 Moth in private use ===
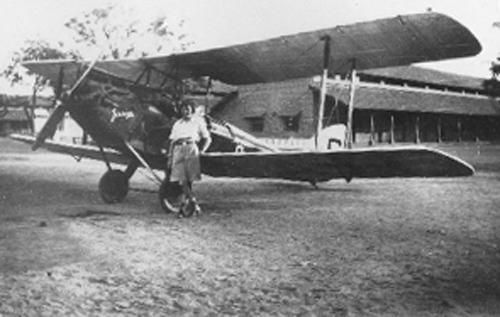
Amy Johnson and Jason, a DH.60G Gipsy Moth, in Jhansi, India in 1930

Most Gipsy Moths belonged to flying clubs, but after the Prince of Wales purchased a Gipsy Moth (G-AALG) for his own private flying, the aircraft became popular with high society. In addition the Moth was used for many record flights. The 'Lonely Flyer' Sir Francis Chichester flew his Gipsy Moth from England to Australia, on to New Zealand and then across the Pacific to Japan. Although he originally planned to fly around the world, a crash in Japan convinced him to switch to sailing. (Chichester subsequently named his yachts 'Gipsy Moth II', 'Gipsy Moth III', and most famously, 'Gipsy Moth IV'.)

Of the aviatrixes, London secretary Amy Johnson flew her Gipsy Moth (G-AAAH "Jason") 11,000 mi (17,703 km) to Australia in 1930, and Jean Batten used a Gipsy Moth for her flights from England to India and England to Australia (the aircraft used to fly to India was G-AALG borrowed from Victor Dorée, who then owned the aircraft.) In March 1928 Mary Bailey flew her Cirrus Moth solo from Croydon to Cape Town, a trip of three weeks, and returned the following year.

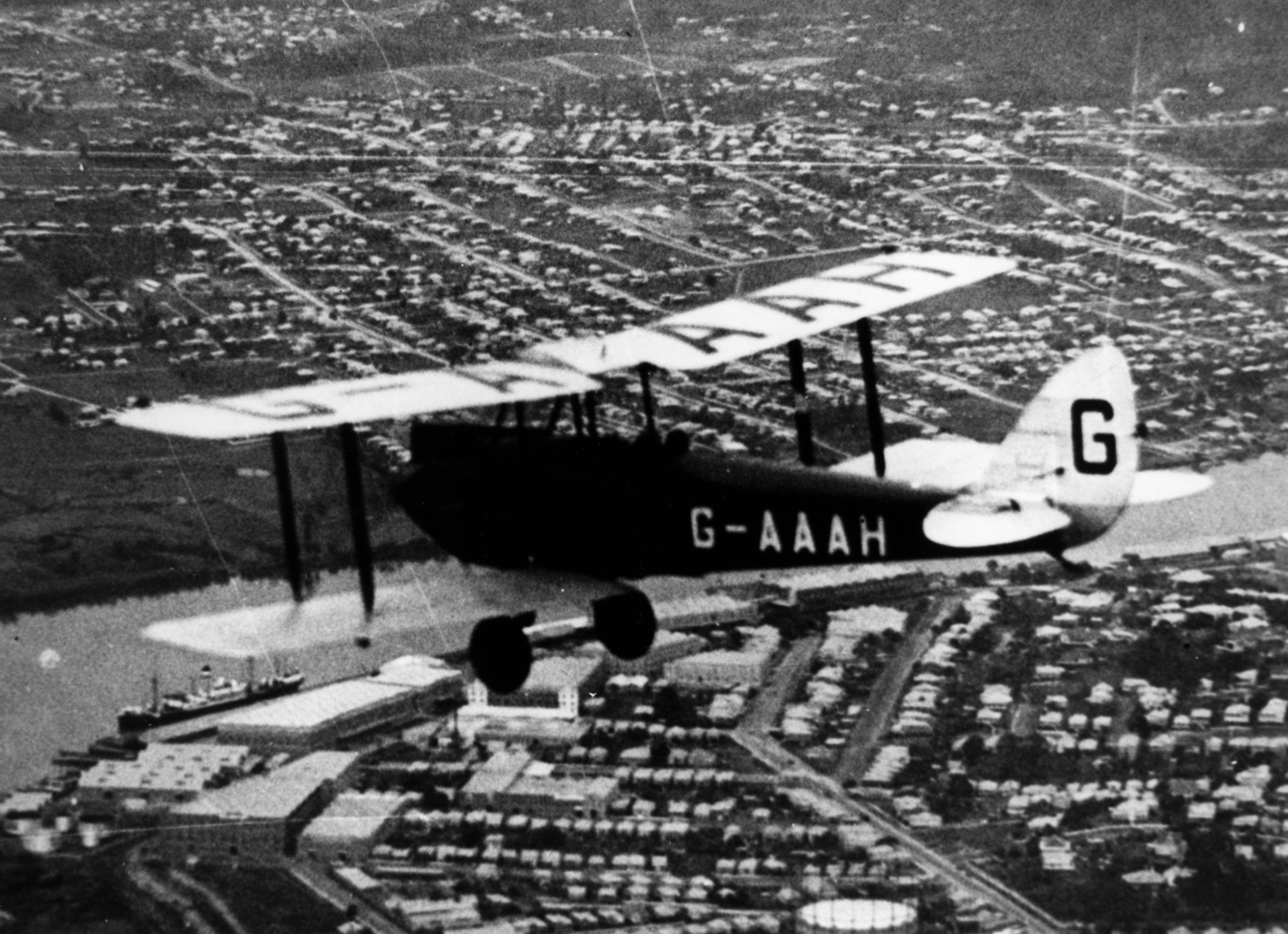
Amy Johnson's Gipsy Moth (G-AAAH "Jason")

=== DH.60 Moth in military service ===
Although the DH.60T was aggressively marketed as a military trainer, response was rather lukewarm. In particular the RAF initially purchased only a handful of aircraft for testing and found that many aspects of the Moth did not suit their method of military flight training. However, by 1931 the RAF had acquired 124 DH.60M Moths and these were used by the Central Flying School and other training units until 1939.

Moth trainers were however ordered by a number of foreign air forces including those of Argentina, Australia (as noted above), Austria, Norway, Portugal, Sweden and the flying arm of the Danish Navy. Finnish Valtion lentokonetehdas licence-built 21 Moth trainers of which 18 were purchased by Finnish Air Force. First examples were equipped with Cirrus engine while 11 later ones had Hermes engine, X-type landing gear struts and a locally built engine cover which earned these the name "Härkä-Moth" ("Bull Moth").

Two Gipsy Moths were purchased by the Paraguayan government during the Chaco War. They were used as liaison aircraft. One was lost in a fatal accident at Ñu-Guazú Air Force Base and the other survived the war. It was transferred to the Paraguayan Aeroclub in 1936.

The bulk of military Moths however were civilian sport aircraft impressed by their countries air forces and used as trainers and liaison aircraft. Like this, civilian Moths ended up flying for both the Nationalist and Republican air forces during the Spanish Civil War. This was repeated on a larger scale during the Second World War where Moths ended up flying, amongst others, for the air forces of Egypt, China (with several captured ex-Chinese aircraft flying for the Japanese), Ireland, Italy, Iraq, Belgian Congo, Dutch East Indies (later taken over by the Indonesian AF), South Africa, New Zealand and the U.S. Navy.

== Variants ==
(Variants are listed in chronological order)

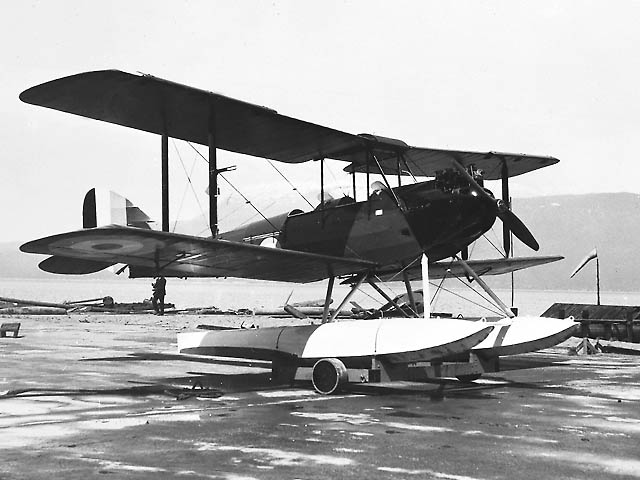
Royal Canadian Air Force DH.60 Cirrus Moth fitted with floats

- DH.60 Moth, (later known as the Cirrus Moth or Cirrus I Moth)

Prototype and early production aircraft powered by a 60 hp (45 kW) ADC Cirrus engine. (later described as a Cirrus Mk I Engine). 8 pre-production and 31 production aircraft built.

- DH.60X Cirrus II Moth (initially known as the Moth Type X or Experimental Moth)

Introduced in 1927 this variant had a slightly larger wingspan by 1 foot, increased length by 2.5 inches and decreased distance between the upper and lower wings. Powered by an uprated 80 hp (60 kW) ADC Cirrus Mark II engine, 333 built. (many were later upgraded to Cirrus Mk III or Cirrus Hermes engines, and eventually to Gipsy engines)

- DH.60 Genet Moth

A small number of DH.60 Moths were fitted with the Armstrong Siddeley Genet radial engine. The type was used by the Royal Air Force Central Flying School for display purposes, six built.

- DH.60G Gipsy Moth

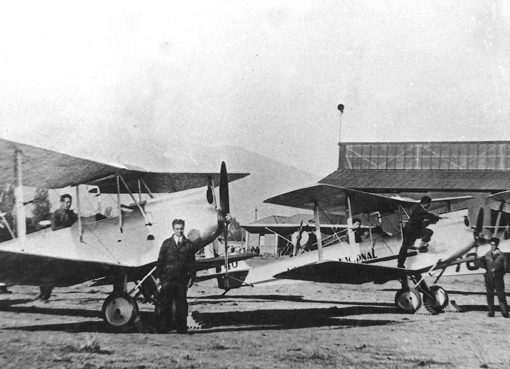
DH.60G Gipsy Moths in service with LAN-Chile, 1933

First major overhaul of the design: Cirrus engine replaced by a 100 hp (75 kW) de Havilland Gipsy I engine.

- DH.60GII Gipsy II Moth

Powered by a 120 hp (89 kW) Gipsy II engine. Commonly referred to as a "Gipsy Moth" just like the 100 hp (75 kW) version.

- DH.60X Gipsy Moth

re-use of the DH60X designation to describe the initially optional 'X' braced undercarriage version of the early Gipsy Moth. (X-style undercarriage became standard for the DH.60M and all subsequent models)
(Production for all Gipsy Moth I and Gipsy Moth II variants: 595 built by de Havilland at Stag Lane Aerodrome, 40 built by Morane-Saulnier in France, 18 built by the Moth Corporation in the United States, and 32 built by Larkin Aircraft Supply Company (LASCO), 3 by General Aircraft Company (Genairco), 1 by Codock (Cockadoo Island Dockyard and Engineering Co Ltd), and 7 by de Havilland Aircraft Pty Ltd (DHA) in Australia.)

- DH.60M Moth (Metal Moth)

The original plywood box fuselage replaced with a construction of metal stringers covered with doped fabric. Although overall weight increased, maintenance became easier and metal fuselages became standard for all later versions. Four pre-production aircraft, 536 built by de Havilland at Stag Lane, 40 built by de Havilland Canada, 161 built by the Moth Corporation in the United States, 10 built by the Norwegian Army Aircraft Factory in Norway, and 6 by the Munitions Supply Board in Australia. American production started in 1928 at Lowell, Massachusetts and continued there until Curtiss-Wright purchased Moth Corporation in 1930 and shifted production to their plant near St Louis. American-built versions were designated DH-60GM when powered by imported British engines, and DH-60GMW with engines built locally under licence.

- DH.60T (Moth Trainer)

Trainer variant of the Metal-Gipsy Moth. Rearranging of the inner wing bracing wires allowed for easier access to the front cockpit, a necessity for military pilots wearing parachutes. Two prototypes and 47 production aircraft were built. Designated I1H in Brazilian Navy service.

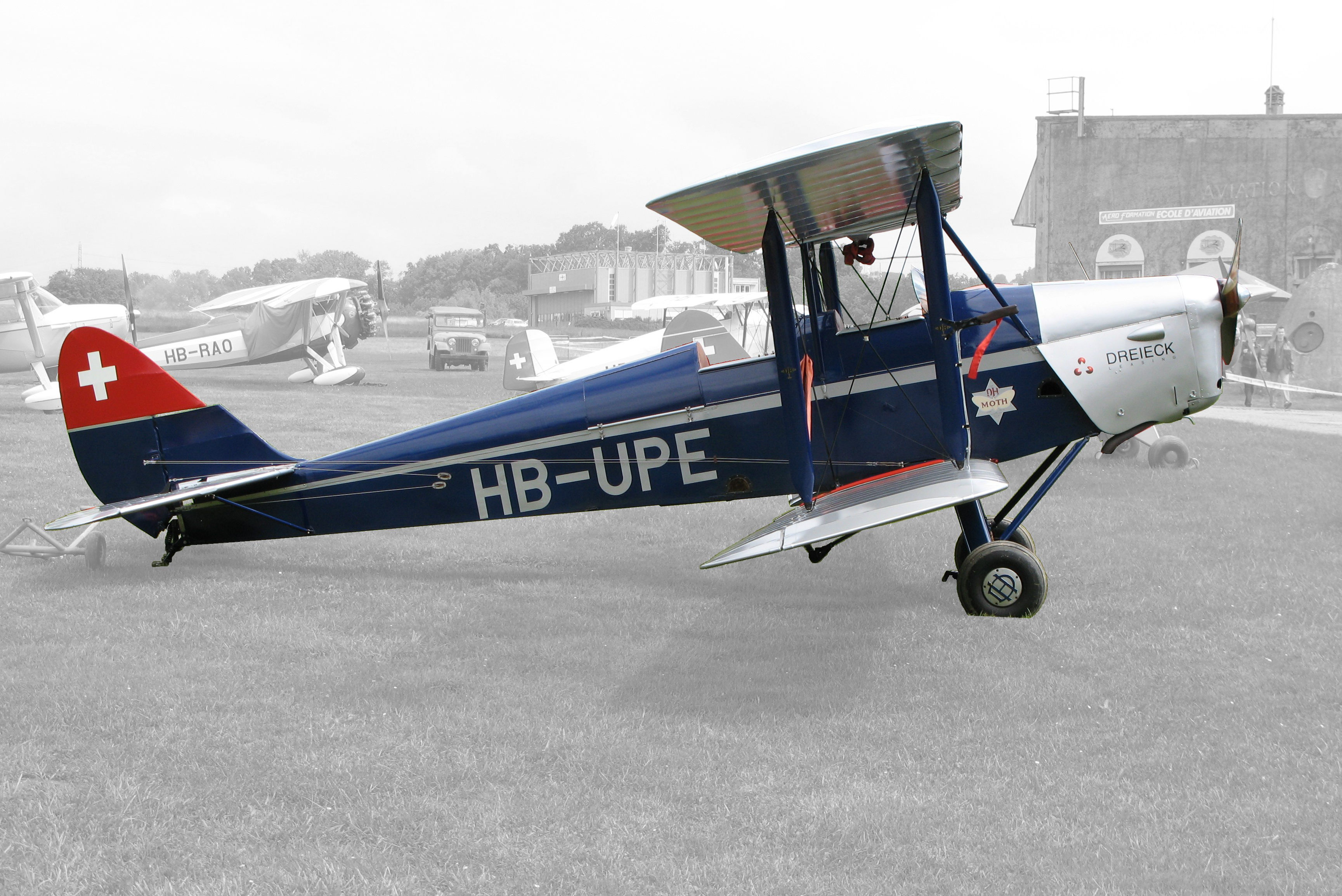
Swiss registered DH.60G III Moth Major

- DH.60G III Moth

In 1931 the company took a de Havilland Gipsy II engine and turned it upside down and re-designated it the Gipsy III, this engine was then fitted to the Moth to create the DG.60G III Moth, 57 built including 10 as fuselages for the Royal Air Force as 'Queen Bee' target drones.

- DH.60G III Moth Major

In 1934 from the 58th DH.60G III onwards, the engine name was changed to Gipsy Major and the resulting variant was renamed the DH.60G III Moth Major. 96 were built including 10 as fuselages for the Royal Air Force as 'Queen Bee' target drones, production ending in May 1935. A final Moth Major was built by the de Havilland Technical School, giving total production of the DH.60G III of 154.

- DH.60T (Tiger Moth Prototypes)

Eight prototypes with swept wings for a proposed RAF trainer. Because of the substantial changes, the aircraft entered production as the DH.82 Tiger Moth.

Note: Variant information taken from Bransom.

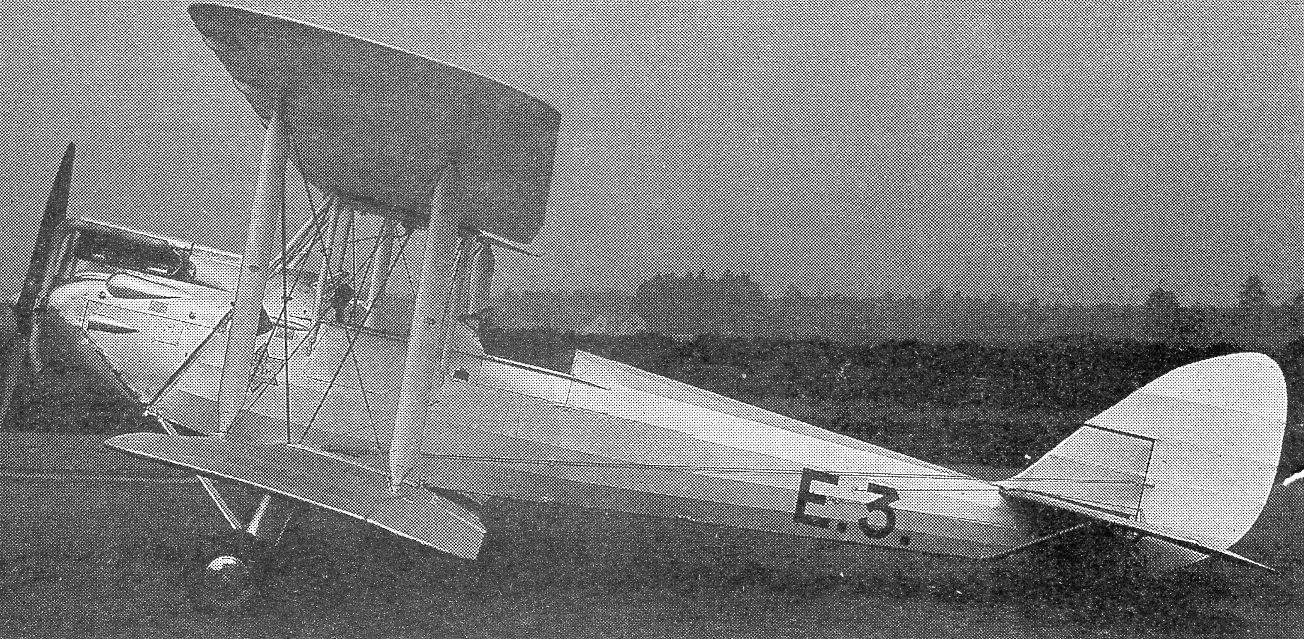
Prototype DH.60T

== Operators ==
=== Military operators ===
Australia

- Royal Australian Air Force

Austria

- Austrian Air Force (1927–1938)

Belgium

- Belgium Air Force – Postwar, one aircraft.

Belgian Congo

- Force Publique

Burma

- Burma Volunteer Air Force – One aircraft only.

Brazil

- Brazilian Air Force
- Brazilian Army
- Brazilian Naval Aviation

Canada

- Royal Canadian Air Force

China

- Chinese Nationalist Air Force

Chile

- Chilean Air Force

Cuba

- Cuban Navy

Denmark

- Danish Army Flying Corps
- Danish Naval Air Service

Egypt

- Royal Egyptian Air Force

Ethiopia

- Imperial Ethiopian Air Force

Finland

- Finnish Air Force: 23 total, including 18 Finnish license-built versions and 5 former civilian aircraft. In use between 1929 and 1944, registrations MO-93, MO-94, MO-96–104, MO-106–116.

France

- Armée de l'air: About 20 requisitioned in September 1939

Germany

- Luftwaffe (small numbers)

Greece

- Hellenic Air Force

Hungary

- Hungarian Air Force

Ireland

- Irish Air Corps

Iraq

- Iraqi Air Force

Empire of Japan (captured from China)
Norway

- Norwegian Army Air Service

New Zealand

- New Zealand Permanent Air Force
- Royal New Zealand Air Force
  - No. 4 Squadron RNZAF

Paraguay

- Paraguayan Air Arm
  - Transport Squadron during the Chaco War

Poland

- Polish Air Force

Portugal

- Portuguese Navy

Romania

- Royal Romanian Air Force

South Africa

- South African Air Force

Spanish Republic

- Spanish Republican Air Force

Spanish State

- Spanish Air Force

Sweden

- Swedish Air Force

United Kingdom

- Royal Air Force
  - Central Flying School
  - Royal Air Force College
  - No. 5 Flying Training School RAF
  - No. 24 Squadron RAF
  - No. 173 Squadron RAF
  - No. 510 Squadron RAF
- Royal Navy Fleet Air Arm

United States

- United States Navy – One DH.60 purchased for use by the US Naval attaché in London.

Kingdom of Yugoslavia

- Royal Yugoslav Air Force
- Yugoslav Royal Navy

== Surviving aircraft ==
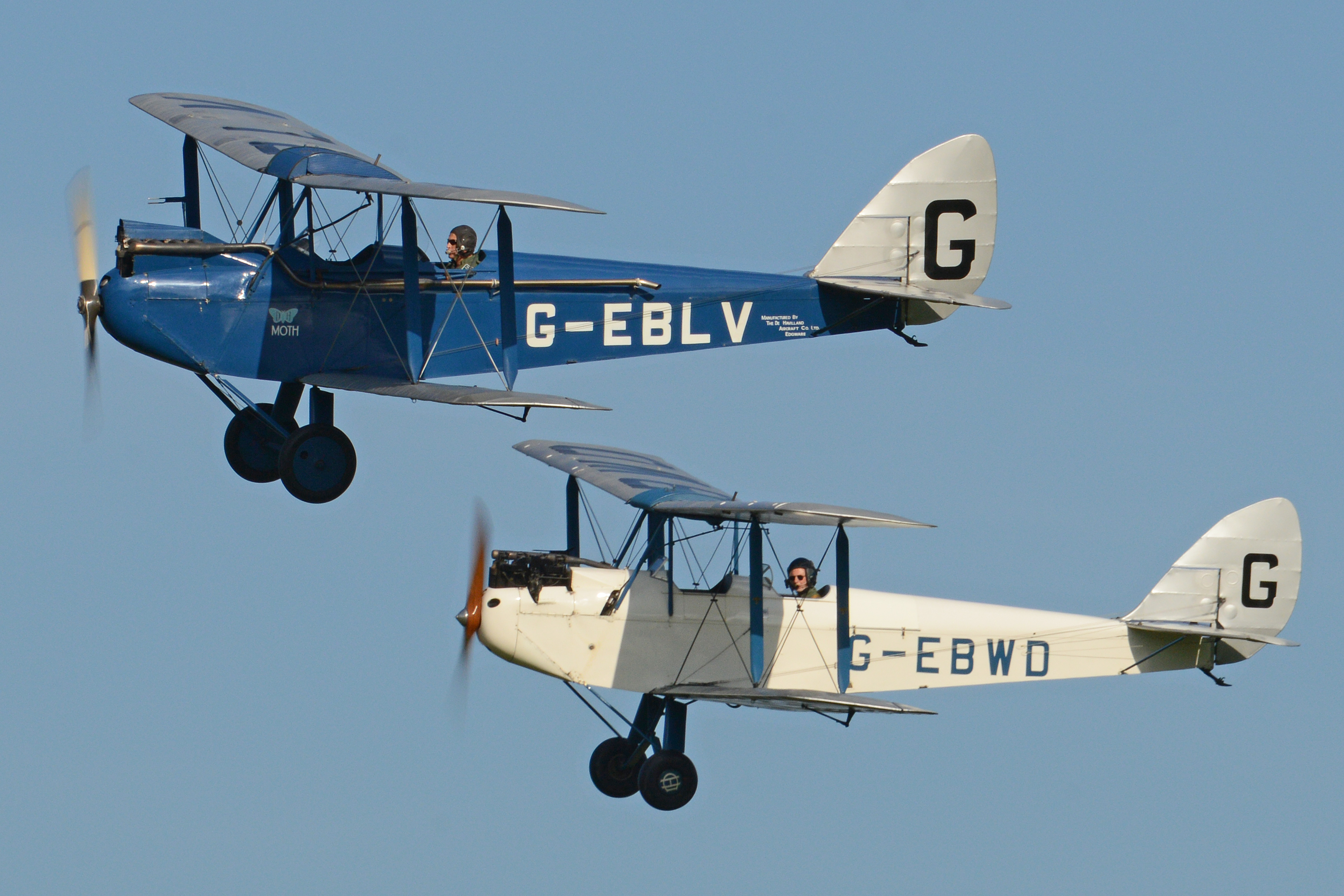
G-EBLV & G-EBWD displaying at Evening Airshow, Old Warden, Bedfordshire.

- 31 de Havilland DH.60 Moths were on the UK aircraft register in August 2017.
- 19 DH.60 Moths were on the Australian aircraft register on 7 May 2023.
- There are 7 static display DH60's in Australia (a DH60X, three DH60G's and two DH60M's.)
- There is one DH.60M at Kjeller Aerodrome outside Oslo, Norway. Built by de Havilland in March 1929, it was shipped to Australia, registered as VH-UKC and won the air race between Sydney and Perth that same year. Crashed in May 1930 and subsequently stored. Remains bought by Kjeller Flyhistoriske Forening in Norway in 2007, and rebuilt to as new standard over a ten-year period. Airworthy, with new registration LN-KFM.
- The oldest surviving DH.60 Moth (G-EBLV built in 1925, the eighth example built), was still airworthy in 2023, and although previously owned and operated by the BAe Systems Heritage Flight in the UK, it has now been donated to the Shuttleworth Collection, Old Warden Aerodrome where it has been based and operated for many years.
- A 1928 DH.60X Moth (G-EBWD) has been based at a single aerodrome (Old Warden) for longer than any other aeroplane in aviation history. This Moth was originally Richard Shuttleworth's own private aircraft in which he learnt to fly and during its career was extensively modified with an original Cirrus Hermes engine but an X-legged undercarriage and different windshields on the front and rear cockpit. It remains airworthy as of August 2017 and is displayed at British airshows during the summer months.
- VH-UAE is the world's second oldest DH.60 still airworthy (serial number 192, constructed in 1925, 12th example built), the first DH60 to be exported, and was first registered in Australia as G-AUAE on 5 November 1925, and later updated to the current VH- registration markings, making it the longest registered, airworthy aircraft in Australia. It was impressed into RAAF for training service during WW2 (A7-88), and disposed of in 1945. The original 'VH' registration was re-issued. Other than a brief restoration time during 2000, the aircraft has been airworthy and registered since 1925.
- A 1928 built DH.60X Moth coded G-EXBU, but with Spanish registration EC-KCY, is kept in flying condition and takes part regularly on the monthly air show held by the Fundación Infante de Orleans in the aerodrome of Cuatro Vientos, in Madrid.

== Aircraft on display ==
The following DH.60 Moth aircraft are on public display in museums:

- DH.60G Gipsy Moth, G-AAAH, Jason used by Amy Johnson is on static display at the London Science Museum.
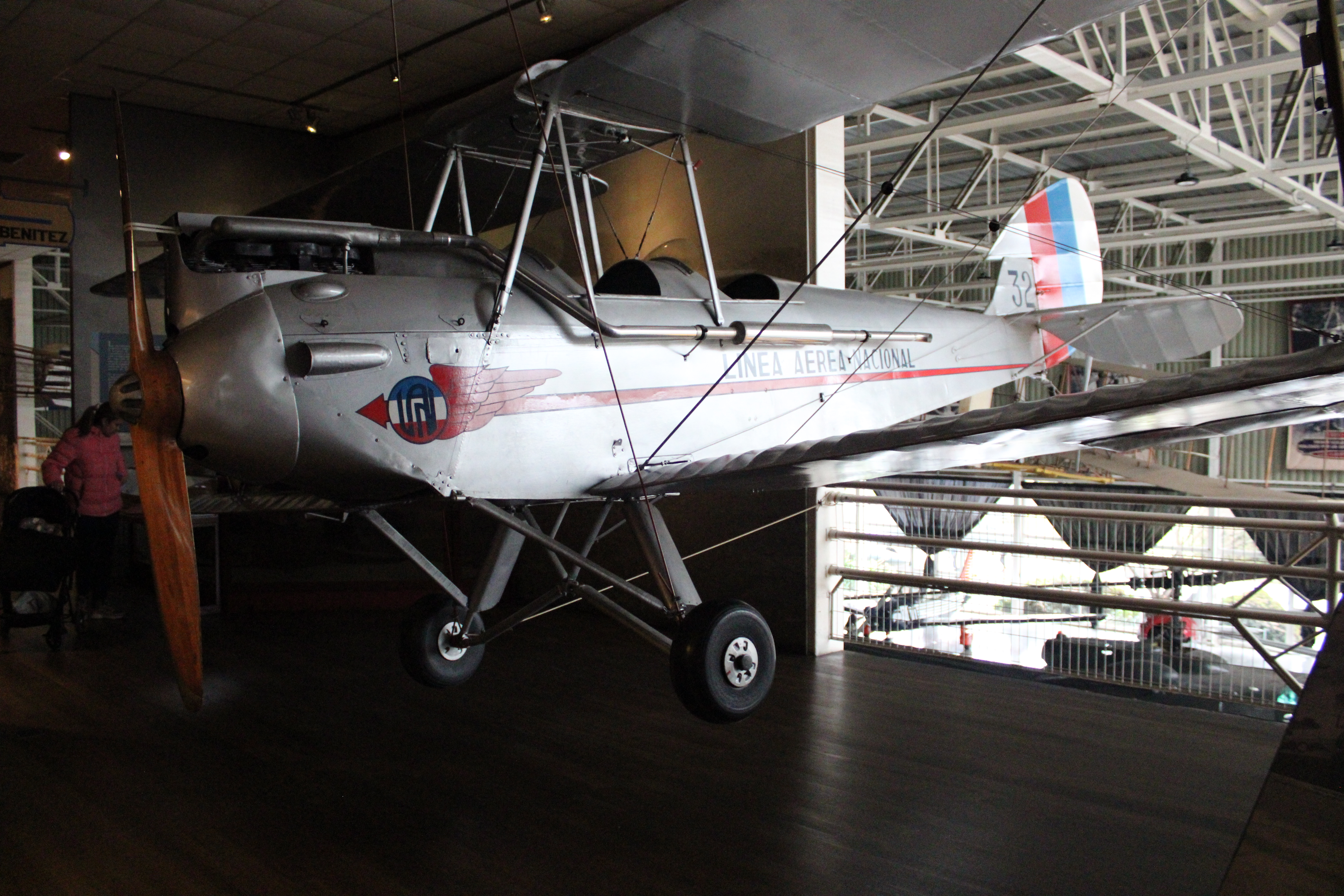
- A gipsy Moth on display, showing the Lan Airlines Colors.
  DH.60G Gipsy Moth, formerly CC-FNG, now marked as 'LAN 32' at Museo Nacional Aeronáutico y del Espacio de Chile, Chile.
- DH 60G Gipsy Moth, formerly VH-ULJ, c/n 1074, on static display at The South Australian Aviation Museum, Port Adelaide, South Australia.
- DH 60G Gipsy Moth, formerly VH-UKV, "Diana" c/n 1066 on static display at the Australian National Aviation Museum,(Moorabbin Air Museum) Moorabbin, Victoria, Australia.
- DH60G Gipsy Moth, OH-VKM on static display at Malmö Museums, Sweden.
- DH60X Cirrus Moth, OH-EJA, ”Jurre”, on static display at Finnish Air Force Museum, Finland

== Specifications (DH.60G Gipsy Moth) ==
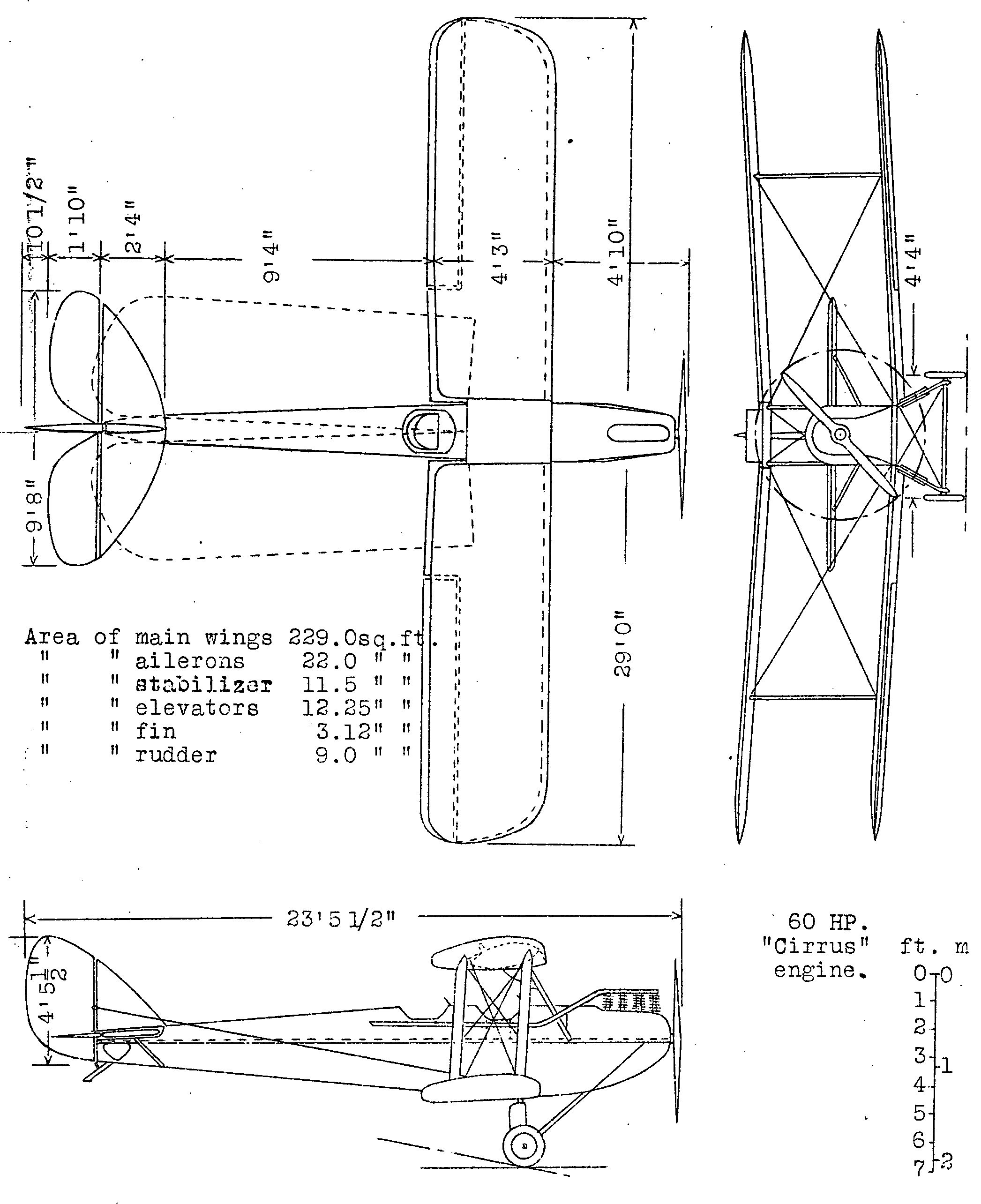
DH.60 Cirrus Moth 3-view drawing from NACA Aircraft Circular No.18

Data from De Havilland Aircraft since 1909

General characteristics

- Crew: 2
- Length: 23 ft 11 in (7.29 m)
- Wingspan: 30 ft 0 in (9.14 m)
- Height: 8 ft 9 1/2 in (2.680 m)
- Wing area: 243 sq ft (22.6 m^{2})
- Empty weight: 920 lb (417 kg)
- Max takeoff weight: 1,650 lb (748 kg)
- Powerplant: 1 × de Havilland Gipsy I 4-cylinder air-cooled in-line piston engine, 100 hp (75 kW)
- Propellers: 2-bladed fixed-pitch propeller

Performance

- Maximum speed: 102 mph (164 km/h, 89 kn)
- Cruise speed: 85 mph (137 km/h, 74 kn)
- Range: 320 mi (510 km, 280 nmi)
- Service ceiling: 14,500 ft (4,400 m)
- Rate of climb: 500 ft/min (2.5 m/s)

== See also ==
- de Havilland Moth

Related development

- Caproni Ca.100
- de Havilland Tiger Moth

Aircraft of comparable role, configuration, and era

- Aero A.34
- Albatros L.82
- Avro Avian
- Boeing-Stearman Model 75
- PZL.5
