= Keith L. Brown (musician) =

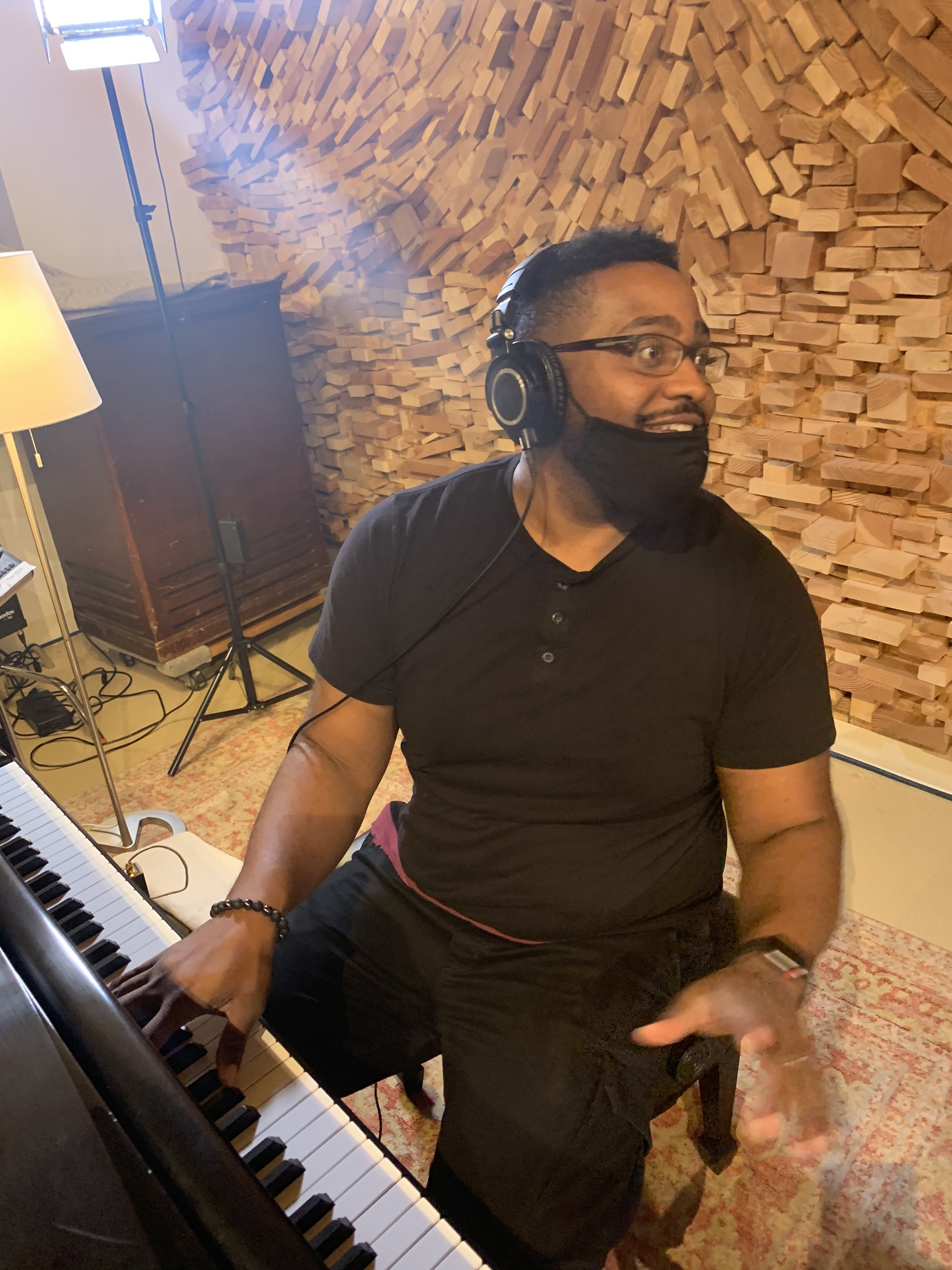

Background information
- Also known as: Keith Brown
- Born: August 13, 1983 (age 43); Memphis, Tennessee, US
- Genres: Jazz (Modern & Traditional), R&B, and Funk
- Occupation: Musician
- Instrument: Piano
- Years active: 2005–present
- Label: Space Time Records
- Website: www.Keithbrownpiano.com

Keith L. Brown (born August 13, 1983) is an American jazz pianist, educator, and composer. He is the regular pianist for Grammy nominated saxophonist Kenny Garrett, and has released three albums on Space Time Records.

== Early life and education ==
Brown was born in Memphis Tennessee and raised in Knoxville, Tennessee, where he developed a deep passion for music from a young age.

Keith's father, Donald Brown, is a jazz pianist, composer, and educator, and producer. Keith's mother Dorothy is also a pianist and plays various woodwind instruments.

== Musical career ==
Brown attended Pellissippi State and The University of Tennessee where he earned bachelor's and master's degrees in music, after which he moved to New York City. There he began touring and performing with artists such as Jazzmeia Horn, Charles Tolliver, Camille Thurman & the Darrell Green Quartet, Stefon Harris, Buster Williams, Lenny White, Dezron Douglas, Sherman Irby, Bill Saxton, Steve Turre, Endea Owens, Melanie Charles, Russell Gunn, Joe Farnsworth, John Clayton, George Coleman, and most recently Kenny Garrett.

In May 2021, Keith released his third album as a leader with Space Time Records under the name "Keith Brown Trio" called African Ripples. Brown says African Ripples was "composed and collected to convey his personal experiences through black music and how it has rippled out in so many different directions." The album received 4 stars from DownBeat Magazine.

== Discography ==
=== As leader/co-leader ===
- Sweet & Lovely (Space Time Records, 2011)
- The Journey (Space Time Records, 2015)
- African Ripples (Space Time Records, 2021)

=== Soundtracks ===
- Canal Street (Space Time Records, 2020) Featured F.R.C. from Keith Brown's album The Journey

=== As Sideman ===
Year released	Leader	Title	Label
2013	Gregory Tardy	Standards and More	SteepleChase
2015	Vance Thompson's Five Plus Six	Such Sweet Thunder	
2017	Kenneth Brown	3 Down	Space Time Records
2019	Steve Slagle	Spirit Calls	Jaxsta
2019	Kenneth Brown	2nd Chances	Space Time Records
2019	Darryl Hall	Swingin' Back	Space Time Records
2019	T.K. Blue	The Rhythms Continue	JAJA Records
2020	Charles Tolliver	Connect	Gearbox Records
2020	Gregory Tardy	If Time Could Stand Still	WJ3 Records
2020	Jazzmeia Horn	Where We Are	Diggers Factory
2021	Kenneth Brown	Love People	Space Time Records
2021	Melanie Charles	Ya'll Don't (Really) Care About Black Women	Verve Records
2021	Janinah Burnett	Love the Color of Your Butterfly	Clazz Records
2021	Jazzmeia Horn and Her Noble Force	Dear Love	Empress Legacy Records
2022	Aaron Bazzell	Aesthetic	
2022	Gregory Tardy	Sufficient Grace	WJ3 Records
2022	Endea Owens	Where the Nubian's Grow	BassBae Music
2023	Brandon Sanders	Compton's Finest	Savant Records
2023	Endea Owens	Feel Good Music	BassBae Music
