= Avro 548 =

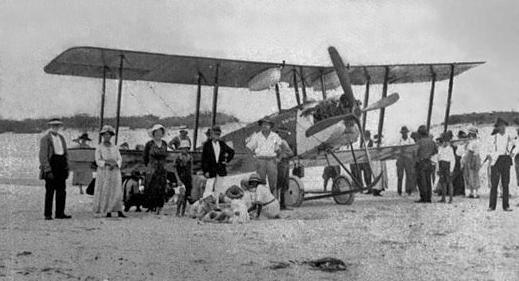
- Avro 548, 1922

General information
- Type: Civil utility aircraft
- Manufacturer: Avro
- Number built: 38

History
- Manufactured: 1920–25
- First flight: October 1919

The Avro 548 was a civil trainer aircraft built in Britain by Avro after World War I. Its design was based extensively on Avro's 504 military aircraft, but it had an inline engine and a third seat. The prototype, designated 545, first flew with a Curtiss OX-5 V-8 engine, but this proved impractical for the civil market on account of the engine's weight and the complexity of its cooling system. An air-cooled Renault engine was used instead, and the designation 548 applied to this configuration. In practice, these aircraft were usually customised for their buyers and most differed from each other in equipment and detail; some were retrofitted war-surplus 504s. Many were used as civil trainers, others for joyriding, personal transport and racing.

A revised version, the 548A resulted when fitted with an ADC Airdisco engine, a development of the Renault which gave 120 hp (90 kW). This engine greatly improved performance.

Plans for a version with an enclosed cabin, designated 553 were never brought to fruition.

== Operators ==
Latvia

- Latvian Air Force - Two 548Ns acquired 1924.

Portugal

- Portuguese Air Force - Two 548As acquired 1924.

== Specifications (548) ==
Data from Avro Aircraft since 1908

General characteristics

- Crew: one pilot
- Capacity: two passengers
- Length: 29 ft 5 in (8.97 m)
- Wingspan: 36 ft 0 in (10.97 m)
- Height: 10 ft 5 in (3.18 m)
- Wing area: 330 sq ft (30.7 m^{2})
- Empty weight: 1,338 lb (607 kg)
- Gross weight: 1,943 lb (881 kg)
- Powerplant: 1 × Renault 80 hp air-cooled V-8 engine , 80 hp (60 kW)

Performance

- Maximum speed: 80 mph (129 km/h, 70 kn)
- Cruise speed: 65 mph (105 km/h, 56 kn)
- Range: 175 mi (282 km, 152 nmi)
- Rate of climb: 350 ft/min (1.8 m/s)
