= Blériot-SPAD S.31 =

1920s French aircraft

SPAD S.31

General information
- Type: Racer aircraft
- National origin: France
- Manufacturer: SPAD
- Number built: 1

History
- First flight: 1920

The Bleriot-SPAD S.30 was a French racer aircraft built in the early 1920s.

== Design ==
The S.31 was a biplane with a monocoque fuselage of wood and canvas construction, as well as floats. It was built to participate in the 1920 Schneider Cup.

== Specifications ==
Data from

General characteristics

- Crew: 1
- Length: 8.20 m (26 ft 11 in)
- Wingspan: 10.43 m (34 ft 3 in)
- Height: 3.42 m (11 ft 3 in)
- Wing area: 31.45 m^{2} (338.5 sq ft)
- Empty weight: 1,075 kg (2,370 lb)
- Gross weight: 1,510 kg (3,329 lb)
- Powerplant: 1 × Hispano-Suiza inline engine, 250 kW (340 hp)
- Propellers: 2-bladed fixed pitchpropeller

Performance

- Maximum speed: 210 km/h (130 mph, 110 kn)

== See also ==
Related lists

- List of Interwar military aircraft
