= Blériot-SPAD S.26 =

SPAD S.26
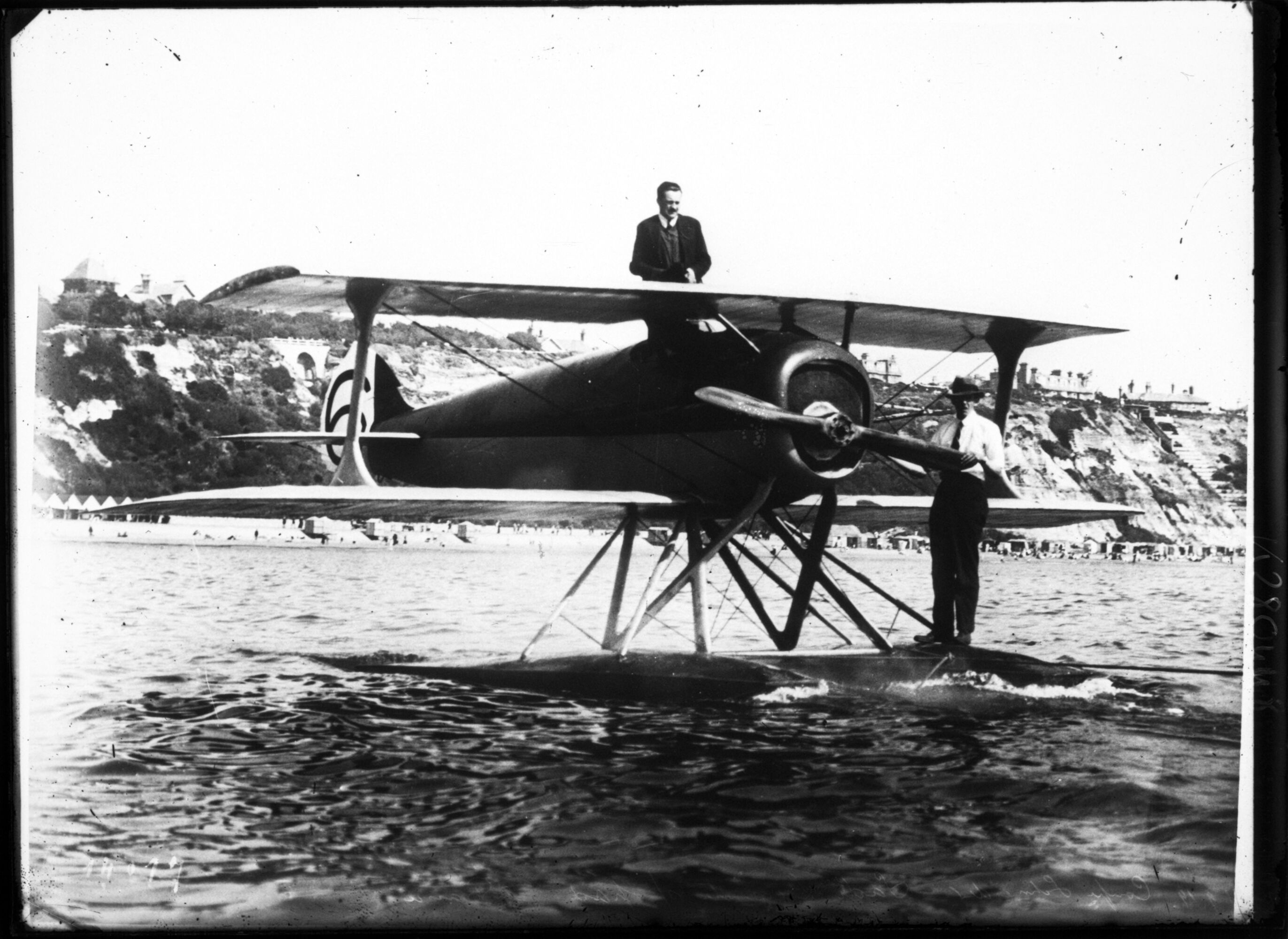

General information
- Type: Seaplane racer
- National origin: France
- Manufacturer: SPAD
- Number built: 1

History
- First flight: 28 August 1919

The Bleriot-SPAD S.26 was a seaplane racer aircraft built in the late 1910s.

== Design ==
The S.26 was a biplane with a monocoque fuselage of wood and canvas construction as well as floats. Although intended to take part in the 1919 Schneider Cup, a puncture in one of the floats during flight testing eliminated it from the Schneider Cup.

== Specifications ==
Data from

General characteristics

- Crew: 1
- Length: 8.10 m (26 ft 7 in)
- Wingspan: 8.69 m (28 ft 6 in)
- Height: 3.16 m (10 ft 4 in)
- Wing area: 26 m^{2} (280 sq ft)
- Empty weight: 850 kg (1,874 lb)
- Gross weight: 1,130 kg (2,491 lb)
- Powerplant: 1 × Hispano-Suiza inline engine, 250 kW (340 hp)
- Propellers: 2-bladed fixed pitchpropeller

Performance

- Maximum speed: 250 km/h (160 mph, 130 kn)

== See also ==
Related lists

- List of Interwar military aircraft
