= Vélizy-Villacoublay Air Base =

French Air Force base near Paris, France

Vélizy-Villacoublay Air Base Base aérienne 107

- IATA: VIY; ICAO: LFPV

Summary
- Owner: Government of France
- Operator: French Air and Space Force
- Location: Villacoublay, France
- Elevation AMSL: 584 ft (178 m)
- Coordinates: 48°46′23″N 002°11′59″E

Map
- Location of Vélizy-Villacoublay Air Base

Runways
| Direction | Length | | Surface |
| Direction | m | ft | Surface |
|---|---|---|---|
| 09/27 | 1,813 | 5,948 | Asphalt |
| 11/29 | 1,212 | 4,000 | Closed |

The Vélizy-Villacoublay Air Base (French: Base aérienne 107 Vélizy-Villacoublay) (IATA: VIY, ICAO: LFPV) is a French Air and Space Force (Armée de l'air et de l'espace, abbr. ALAE) base. The base is located approximately 2 miles (3.2 km) southeast of the centre of Vélizy-Villacoublay; about 8 miles (13 km) southwest of Paris.

The air base property is within three communes in two departments: Vélizy-Villacoublay and Jouy-en-Josas in Yvelines, and Bièvres in Essonne.

== Units ==
The base is the home station for the following units:

- Escadron de Transport 41 Verdun with the SOCATA TBM 700
- Escadron de Transport 60 with the Airbus A330, Dassault Falcon 7X, Dassault Falcon 2000, Dassault Falcon 900 and the Eurocopter AS332 Super Puma
- Escadron d'Hélicoptères 3/67 Parisis with the Eurocopter Fennec
- Escadrille aérosanitaire 6/560 Étampes
- Groupe Interarmées d'Hélicoptères

== Aircraft ==
Aircraft assigned to the base are:

- 1 Airbus A330-200 (Presidential plane: Cotam 001) (however, the runways are too short for this plane, which is stationed at Évreux-Fauville Air Base)
- 2 Dassault Falcon 7X
- 3 Eurocopter AS332 Super Puma
- 2 Dassault Falcon 2000EX
- 8 AS 555UN FENNEC
- 2 Dassault Falcon 900
- 6 TBM700

The air base is also important for the national security of France through the Joint Service Helicopter Group (Groupe interarmées d'hélicoptères). The Group is a joint Army / Air Force unit and provides air mobility to the country's two prime counter-terror units - the National Gendarmerie's GIGN and the National Police's RAID. The force is composed of six Aérospatiale SA 330 Puma helicopters, four provided by the Army Special Operations Brigade's 4th Special Forces Helicopter Regiment and two by the French Air and Space Force.

== History ==
=== Early history ===
Airfield in 1912

The Villacoublay plateau has played an important role in the development of French aviation ever since artist and photographer Nadar took the world's first aerial photographs from a balloon here in 1858. The world's first closed circuit flight took place at nearby Chalais-Meudon, in the airship La France, designed and flown by Charles Renard and Arthur Constantin Krebs, on 9 August 1884. It flew around Villacoublay during its 23-minute flight. In 1897, Clement Ader tested his Avion III on a circular track at nearby Satory with total lack of success.

Count Charles de Lambert owned two Wright biplanes. In 1910 his flying field flooded, and he was moving the aircraft by oxcart when he needed to stop in Villacoublay, at a farm whose owner, Paul Dautier, had the previous year permitted an aircraft, designed by Alfred de Pischof and Paul Koechlin to fly from his land. Dautier offered Lambert his fields as a base for the aircraft. The Count accepted and, as holder of the Wrights' patents, set up the Wright-Astra flying school later that year. Louis Breguet followed, and set up an aircraft factory and flying school in July 1911. The Morane Brothers joined in, buying fields around the original farm in February 1912 to establish their school, and the Nieuport flying school followed that November.

The French Army had also arrived in 1910, using it for aircraft testing, one of the first tests being of air-to-ground radio. The ground's proximity to Paris meant that Military Aeronautics, which was created in 1912, used the airfield to give demonstrations to high-ranking officials, performed in March and September 1912. The first flight test conducted by the Service Technique de l'Aéronautique (STAé) took place here in the same year, and the airfield remained a military flight test centre until World War II.

Société Astra, an established builder of airships and balloons, had acquired the licence to build Wright designs in 1909, and set up workshops at Villacoublay in 1912. They developed their own designs, the Astra C and Astra CM, which were built here. In 1914 Louis Breguet expanded his workshops, moving into old Michelin works nearby. It became a main manufacturing base until in 1936 when Breguet and the works were taken over by the government-owned Arsenal de l'Aéronautique.

Activity continued unabated during World War I, and during the 1920s and 1930s many air shows and flying events were held at the airfield, and there were particularly big shows in 1937 and 1938. Marcel Bloch also set up facilities here, the company's first military aircraft, the MB.80, making its first flight at the airfield in the summer of 1932. The field was divided into two main areas, with commercial activity to the north, and military activity to the south, both sharing the flying field.

At the beginning of World War II French fighter units moved in to help defend Paris, but on 3 June 1940 the airfield was heavily bombed by the Luftwaffe. The base was soon evacuated, and the Germans occupied it on 13 June.

Destroyed Junkers Ju 88 at Villcoublay airfield, September 1944

=== German use during World War II ===
Seized by the Germans in June 1940 during the Battle of France, Villacoublay was used as a Luftwaffe military airfield during the occupation. Known units assigned (all from Luftflotte 3, Fliegerkorps IV):

- Kampfgeschwader 55 (KG 55) 21 June 1940 – 16 June 1941 Heinkel He 111P/H (Fusalage Code: G1+)
- Kampfgeschwader 27 (KG 27) Jun-July 1940 Heinkel He 111P (Fusalage Code: 1G+)
- Aufklärungsgruppe 14 (AFG 14) Nov 1940-May 1941 Junkers Ju 88
- Jagdfliegerschule 5 (JFS 5) Jun 1941-24 February 1943 Messerschmitt Bf 109
- Jagdgeschwader 105 (JG 105) 25 February-31 August 1943 Messerschmitt Bf 109
- Jagdgeschwader 54 (JG 54) 7 June-5 September 1944 Focke-Wulf Fw 190A

KG 55 and KG 27 took part in the Battle of Britain; AFG 14 was a photoreconnaissance organization; JFS 5 was a training unit for Bf 109 pilots; JG 105 and JG 54 were day interceptor units against Eighth Air Force heavy bombers.

It was attacked on several occasions by heavy bombers of both the United States Army Air Forces (USAAF) Eighth and Fifteenth Air Forces during 1943 and early 1944. Largely due to its use as a base for Bf 109 and Fw 190 interceptors, Villacoublay was attacked by USAAF Ninth Air Force Martin B-26 Marauder medium bombers and Republic P-47 Thunderbolts mostly with 500-pound general-purpose bombs; unguided rockets and .50 caliber machine gun sweeps when Eighth Air Force heavy bombers (Boeing B-17 Flying Fortresses, Consolidated B-24 Liberators) were within interception range of the Luftwaffe aircraft assigned to the base. The attacks were timed to have the maximum effect possible to keep the interceptors pinned down on the ground and be unable to attack the heavy bombers. Also the P-51 Mustang fighter-escort groups of Eighth Air Force would drop down on their return to England and attack the base with a fighter sweep and attack any target of opportunity to be found at the airfield.

=== American use ===
It was liberated by Allied ground forces about 27 August 1944 during the Northern France Campaign. Almost immediately, the USAAF IX Engineer Command 818th Engineer Aviation Battalion began clearing the base of mines and destroyed Luftwaffe aircraft; filling bomb craters in the runway with rubble and an asphalt patch along with repairing operational facilities for use by American aircraft. Subsequently, Villacoublay became a USAAF Ninth Air Force combat airfield, designated as "A-42" about 30 August, only a few days after its capture from German forces.

Almost immediately, the 48th Fighter Group moved into the repaired air base, flying P-47 Thunderbolts from 29 August until 15 September 1944. The combat unit moved east along with the advancing Allied forces and Villacoublay became a supply and maintenance base for combat aircraft, becoming the home of the 370th Air Service Group and several Air Materiel squadrons from Air Technical Service Command. It was also given the designation of AAF-180. In addition, numerous C-47 Skytrain squadrons moved in and out, supporting airborne operations, including Operation Varsity, and Allied airborne crossing of the Rhine in March 1945.

After the war ended, Villacoublay remained under American control, designated as AAF Station Villacoublay. It was assigned to the United States Air Forces in Europe (USAFE) as a transport base by the C-47 Skytrain-equipped 314th Troop Carrier Group. It remained under USAFE control until 31 August 1946 when it was returned to the French Air Force.

=== From 1945 ===
The base has been totally rebuilt since the war. The prewar/wartime runway, 11/29 was closed and a new east–west 6000' (1800m) runway 09/27 was laid down along with expanded aircraft parking areas and multiple hangars as part of an operational NATO air base.

For a period after 1964 the base was the home to the Military Air Transport Command (COTAM), and also to the Air Force Training Command.

The body of Diana, Princess of Wales was flown from Vélizy-Villacoublay Air Base to RAF Northolt, west London, after her death in Paris on August 31, 1997.

== Facilities ==
It has the head office of the Bureau enquêtes accidents pour la sécurité de l'aéronautique d'État (BEA-É). This agency investigates accidents and incidents involving government and military aircraft.

== See also ==
- Advanced Landing Ground
