= Lycée Chaptal =

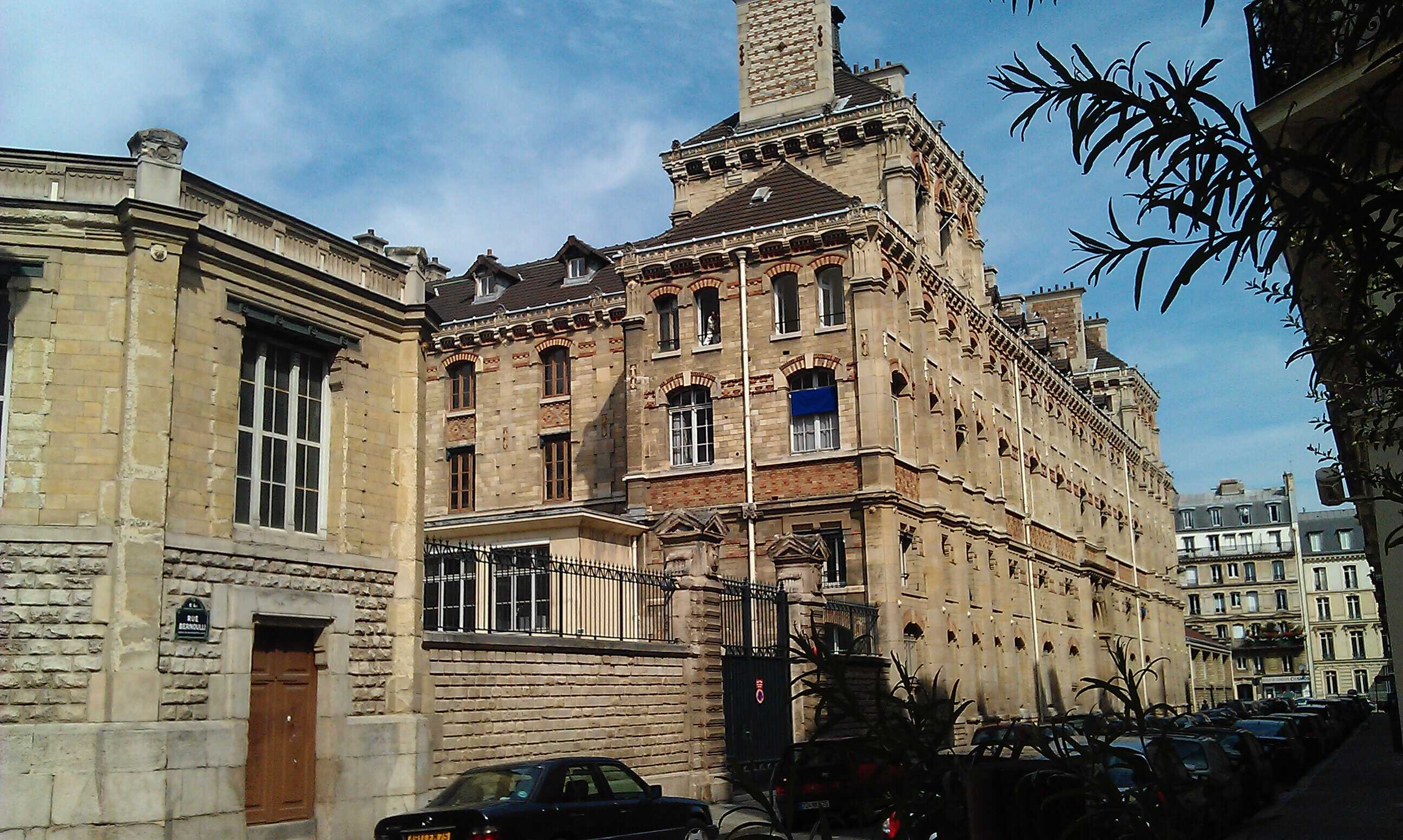

Location
- 45 Boulevard des Batignolles 75008 Paris; France
- 48.881258°N 2.319868°E

Information
- Type: Lycée
- Established: 7 October 1844; 181 years ago
- School district: 8th arrondissement
- Website: www.lycee-chaptal-paris.fr

The Lycée Chaptal, formerly the Collège Chaptal, is a large secondary school in the 8th arrondissement of Paris, named after Jean-Antoine Chaptal, with about 2,000 pupils. It was taken over by the City of Paris in 1848 after the founder ran into financial difficulties. The pupils were expected to go on to careers in commerce or manufacturing. The curriculum was innovative for its day, with emphasis on French rather than classical studies, and on modern languages and science. At the first it was primarily a boys' boarding school, but it is now a co-educational day school. The present buildings were completed in 1876. Notable alumni include Alfred Dreyfus, André Breton, Jean Anouilh, Daniel Hechter and Nicolas Sarkozy.

== Foundation ==
Prosper Goubaux (1795–1858), a writer and professor of the University of Paris, had founded the Pension Saint-Victor in 1844. It provided board and lodging for students at the Collège Bourbon. (Note: The Lycée impérial Bonaparte became the Collége royal Bourbon in 1914. During the French Revolution of 1848 the Collége Bourbon was briefly called the Lycée Chaptal, but soon returned to the original name of Lycée Bonaparte. This school is now the Lycée Condorcet.) Goubaux saw growth in industry, commerce, agriculture and applied sciences, and saw that parents wanted their children to be prepared for these occupations through special studies. However, contemporary state education ignored these needs and was solely concerned with classical literary studies. Goubaux wanted to create a college for the sons of the prosperous middle classes, from whom would come the heads of the great commercial and industrial enterprises. It would teach boys to understand their times, and to appreciate the great achievements of modern civilization, while also being aware of literature and the arts.

The idea of vocational education, and of replacing study of the classics with courses in French, modern languages and science, was revolutionary. At the time, most learned men thought that a classical education gave a solid, moral basis. Without it the only end in life would be to make money. Goubaux asserted that models of virtue and heroism could be found outside the poems of Virgil and Homer, and that the study of science and of all of creation was more valuable than the study of Livy or Tacitus. In France, surely public education should also include the study of France, the French language and French literature. Abel-François Villemain, the Minister of Education, said "A French college in France, never!"

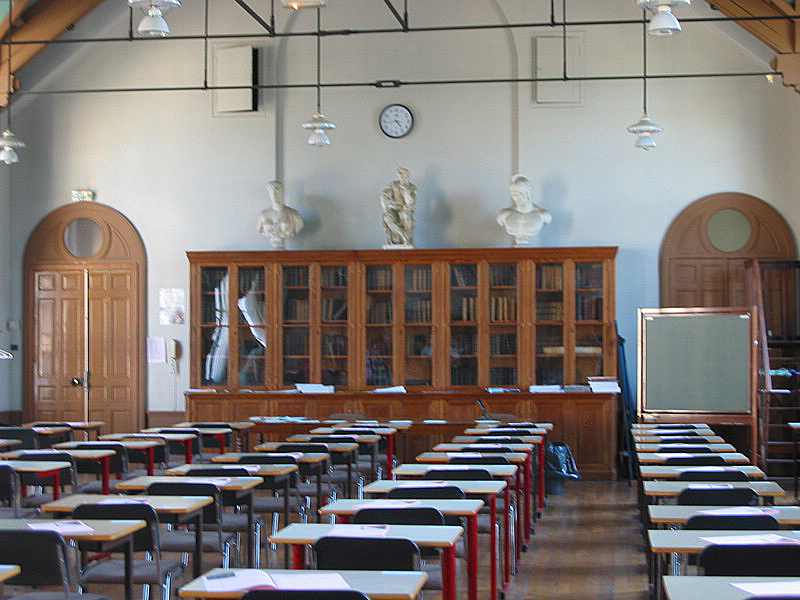
Salle Prosper Goubaux in the 1876 school building

The city of Paris proved more open than the state to the ideas advanced by Goubaux, and allowed him to open the establishment called at first the École municipale Francois I^{er}, changed to Collège Chaptal in 1848. Courses began on 7 October 1844. The school was supervised by a board composed of the director, Prosper Gobaux, and six members of the municipal council. It was located on a site between the Rue Blanche and Rue de Clichy. The school did not conform to the normal pattern of state schools. In its lower, or preparatory classes it gave elementary primary education. In its middle classes it gave advanced primary education, and in its upper classes it gave scientific secondary education. There were also elements of classical secondary education, since it gave some Latin classes.

== History ==
Goubaux ran into debt when a partner absconded with the school's funds. In 1848 he persuaded the City of Paris to take over responsibility for the school, while he continued as director. The study of Latin was introduced in 1850. That year the 6th year program was introduced, designed to prepare students for entry to the grandes écoles such as the École Polytechnique, École Centrale Paris and École des Mines de Paris. Subjects included technology, industrial economy, law and administration. In 1853 the courses were codified and defined in detail. Latin was definitely established in 1853 to meet the needs of the baccalauréat of sciences. Pupils were required to study that language if they wanted to continue beyond the fourth year.

Goubaux died in 1858 and was succeeded by M. Moujean, who directed the college until 1887. It was during his tenure that Chaptal became firmly established as one of the leading public educational establishments in France. By 1867 the school had 1,055 pupils. In 1868 the educationalist Matthew Arnold wrote that the college had 1,000 scholars, of whom 600 were boarders and paid £40 per year. It was one of the two great municipal schools of Paris, the other being the École Turgot. The École Turgot was a day school, mainly for the sons of small tradespeople, while the Collège Chaptal served children of more prosperous parents. An 1868 description said,

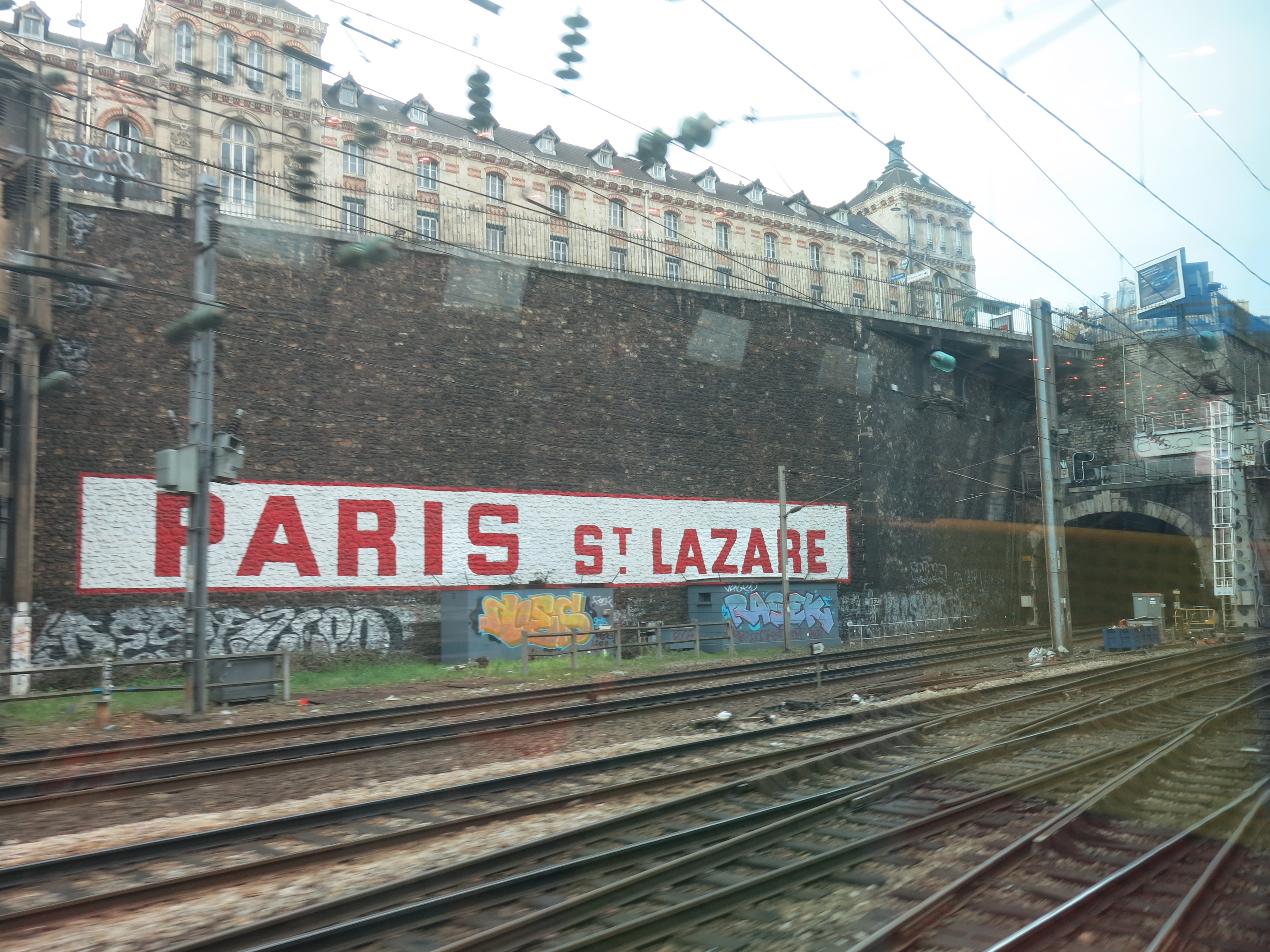
Lycée Chaptal above the railways tracks of the Gare Saint-Lazare

With a large staff of well-paid professors and teachers, whose cost amounts to nearly 12,000l., this school now pays a surplus of over 8,200l. per annum to the city funds. Among its professors are some of the most eminent in France, and they teach carefully and examine closely. For the six weeks preceding their vacation, the boys of the upper division pay visits to industrial works, and take notice of the dimensions of the machinery, and of the parts of the works, from which they afterwards execute plans and elevations. Some of these drawings are accurately made and beautifully finished. The boys from this school are almost uniformly successful in obtaining admission to the École Centrale des Arts et Manufactures, and a fair proportion of them pass the unusually difficult entrance examination of the École Polytechnique.

The original premises were irregular in plan and too cramped for the student body, despite additions and rented properties on the Rue Pigalle and Rue de Clichy. In a session at the Hôtel de Ville on 10 July 1862 the college's board of directors agreed on a move to "spacious gardens" of 13,500 square metres (145,000 sq ft) in the area between the Boulevard des Batignolles to the north, the newly opened Rue de Rome, the Rue de Bernoulli and the Rue Andrieux. The architect Eugène Train (1832–1930) was selected to build the new school following specifications defined by the city. Construction started in 1866, but was interrupted by the Franco-Prussian War of 1870. Work resumed in 1871 and was completed in 1876. (Note: The Casino de Paris now occupies the site of the original school, which was demolished after the school had moved to the new buildings in 1874.)

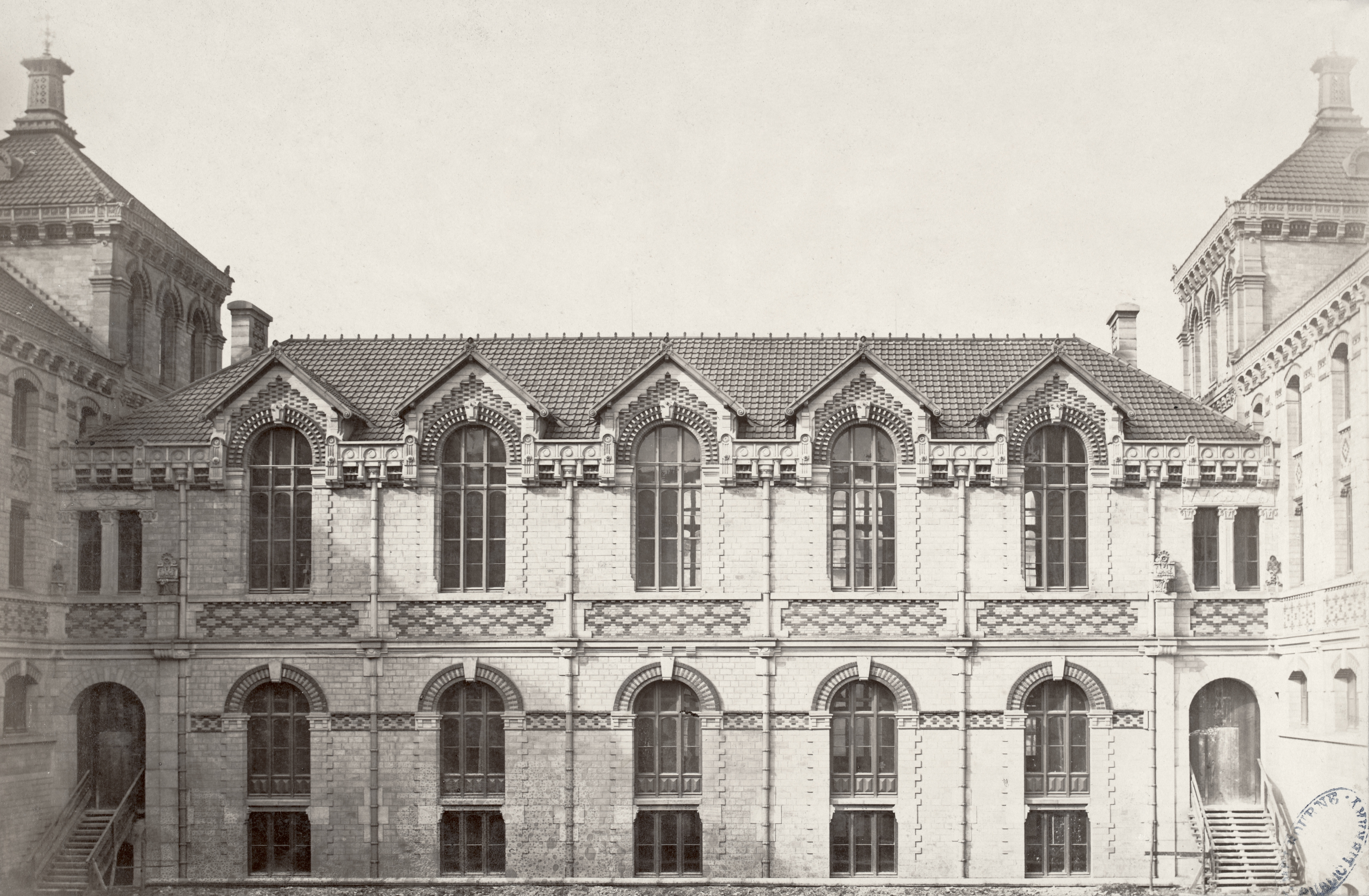
Interior court

In 1869 changes were made to meet the needs of pupils destined for commercial careers. Students who had not studied Latin could now continue into their fifth year with senior commercial studies. 6,587 youths were educated at the Collège Chaptal between 1867 and 1877. Of these, three quarters engaged in trade, 7% in manual labor, 2% in the liberal professions, and the remainder went on the university in France or abroad. There were more than 1,300 pupils by 1878. The school was prosperous, with fees covering expenses. An 1880 description of the school said it was very similar to the best German Realschule. The regular five-year course covered religious instruction, mathematics, physics, natural sciences, French language and literature, modern languages, history, geography, industrial and artistic drawing, music, gymnastics and military exercises. A sixth year prepared students for the Polytechnic or other school that demanded advanced knowledge of mathematics.

The college ran educational trips in the vacations where fifty of the top pupils were taken by a professor to visit an important center of industry or other interest, funded by the Paris Municipal Council. In 1879 the Chaptal students visited Le Havre. The Ghilde Les Forgerons (Guild of the Smiths) was founded in 1911 by a group of young activist intellectuals who were pupils of the Collège Chaptal and had a common interest in art. They were led by Luc Mériga (pseudonym of Maurice Liger). Magdeleine Paz was a member. The Ghilde Les Forgerons was active until 1919, and dissolved in 1920.

Moujean was succeeded in 1887 by Ernest Charles Coutant, formerly director of the École Jean-Baptiste-Say. The college retained its unusual organization that let it give both primary and secondary education. The building was planned for 1,000 pupils, but had 1,300 in 1877, 1,500 in 1900 and 1,900 in the 1980s. This growth was made possible by the decline in numbers of resident students, so dormitories could be transformed into classrooms. Before becoming the Lycée Chaptal in 1945, the municipal college was administered under a special statute, with highly qualified teachers, and included classes to prepare students for admission to the grandes écoles.

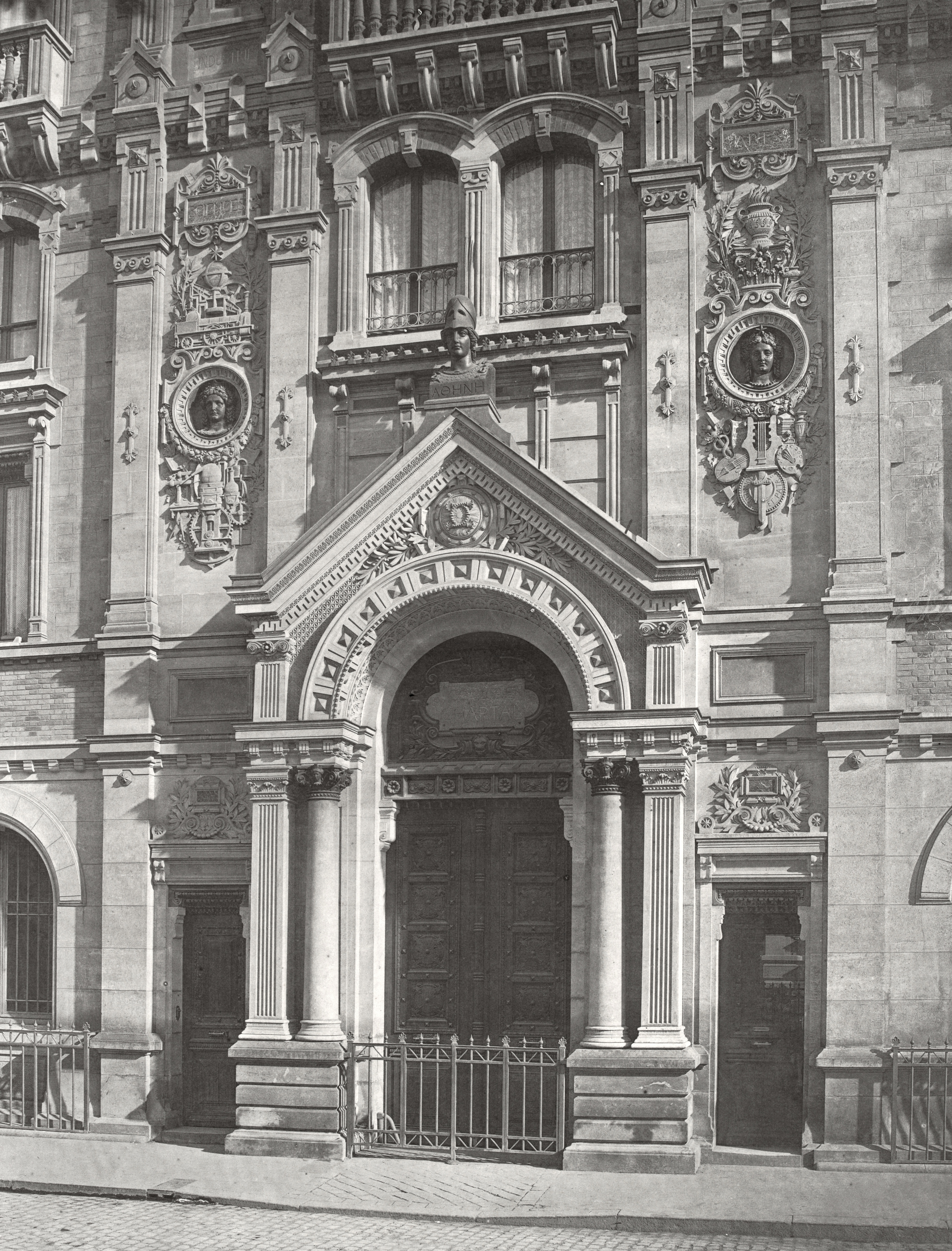
Main portico

== Building ==
Eugène Train designed a complex with three colleges – lower, middle and high – each arranged round a court. The colleges had separate entrances on the Boulevard des Batignolles, Rue de Rome and Rue Andrieux, and each had its own classrooms, study rooms and one or more amphitheaters. The colleges were connected by covered galleries to shared facilities in the center including the refectory, gymnasium, drawing rooms and lecture halls for physics and chemistry. The facade on the Boulevard des Batignolles included the administrative offices. The buildings were modern, with radiators for heating, ventilation, water tanks and gas lighting. Giandomenico Facchina contributed mosaics.

The facade on the Boulevard des Batignolles combines Romanesque and the Renaissance elements. It is over 100 metres (330 ft) in length, flanked by square towers, The decor includes multi-colored geometric brick patterns, serrated cornices, wrought iron work and carved reliefs representing Trade, Industry, Science and Art. The pediment of the main entrance is crowned by a bust of Athena. The design was not a complete break from the barracks-style schools of the period, but Train had tried to make it more welcoming and modern. The finished building was praised for its design and appearance, and for achieving good quality at low cost.

In 1881 the library was moved into the chapel and in 1885 a large gym was built on the Rue Andrieux. Since then there have been relatively few changes. The chapel was replaced by a concrete building holding the documentation and information centers, with a second gym in the basement. The building that holds the drawing rooms was raised by one floor to create dormitories. The college was designated a historical monument in 1992 and is indexed in the Base Mérimée, a database of architectural heritage maintained by the French Ministry of Culture, under the reference PA00088868.

== Rankings ==
For the years 2008 to 2014 the lycée ranked 8th out of 109 at the departmental level in terms of quality of education, and 106th at the national level. In 2015 L'Étudiant gave the following rankings compared to selected schools for the 2014 course:

| Stream | Admissions to a grande école | Rate of admission | 5 year average | National rank | Change in one year |
|---|---|---|---|---|---|
| Economic & commercial (ECS) | 5 / 43 pupils | 12% | 14% | 26th of 95 | ▼1 |
| Literature (Khâgne LSH) | 9 / 68 pupils | 13% | 8% | 7th of 73 | ▲1 |
| Mathematics & physics (MP) | 9 / 79 pupils | 11% | 12% | 32nd of 114 | ▼5 |
| Physics & chemistry (PC) | 8 / 75 pupils | 11% | 8% | 20th of 110 | ▲16 |
| Physics & engineering sciences (PSI) | 30 / 93 pupils | 32% | 23% | 16th of 120 | ▲4 |
| Physics & technology (PT) | 23 / 37 pupils | 62% | 59% | 4th of 62 | ▼2 |
| Biology, chemistry, physics and earth sciences (BCPST) | 21 / 76 pupils | 28% | 28% | 37th of 53 | ▲6 |

== Notable alumni ==
- Cyril Abiteboul (born 1977), racing car engineer
- Jean Anouilh (1910–87), dramatist
- Dove Attia (born 1957), music producer
- Zo d'Axa (1864–1930), journalist
- Didier Barbelivien (born 1954), lyricist
- Jean-Louis Barrault (1910–1994), actor, theatre director
- Patrick Baudry (born 1946), astronaut
- André Breton (1896–1966), writer
- Philippe Bouvard (born 1929), TV presenter
- Henri Cordier (1849–1925), ethnographer
- Bernard Cottret (born 1951), historian
- Alfred Dreyfus (1859–1935), officer (see Dreyfus affair)
- Mathieu Dreyfus (1857–1930), industrialist
- René Dubos (1901–1982), microbiologist
- Marie-Louise Dubreil-Jacotin (1905–72), mathematician
- Alexandre Dumas, fils (1824–1895), writer
- Pierrette Fleutiaux (born 1941), writer
- Eugène Freyssinet (1879-1962), civil engineer
- Abel Gance (1889–1981), film director
- Aristide Gromer (born 1908), chess master.
- Daniel Hechter (born 1938), fashion designer
- Paul César Helleu (1859–1927), artist
- Michel Houellebecq (born 1956), writer
- Charles Koechlin (1867–1950), composer
- Richard Lahautière (1813–82), journalist
- Michel Lang (1939–2014), film director
- André Joseph Lefèvre (1869–1929), politician
- Lucien Lévy (1892–1965), radio engineer and radio receiver manufacturer.
- Jean-Louis Le Moigne (born 1931), engineer
- Raymond Loewy (1893–1986), industrial designer
- Salvador de Madariaga ((1886–1978), diplomat
- Paul Morand (1888–1976), author
- Philbert Maurice d'Ocagne (1862–1935), mathematician
- Léon Ortiz (1868–after 1901), anarchist, burglar and notable illegalist
- Magdeleine Paz (1889–1973), journalist
- Alfred de Pischof (1882–1922), aviation pioneer
- René Quinton (1866–1925), physiologist
- Jean Ramadier (1913–1968), colonial administrator
- Bernard Roy (born in 1934), mathematician
- Nicolas Sarkozy (born 1955), politician
- Jeanloup Sieff (1933–2000), photographer
- Jean Yanne (1933–2003), actor

== Notable teachers ==
- Henri Abraham (1868–1943), physicist
- Jacques Ancel (1879–1943), geographer
- Charles Angrand (1854–1926), mathematician and artist
- Athanase Josué Coquerel (1820–75), theologian
- Georges Dumas (1866–1946), doctor and psychologist
- Pierrette Fleutiaux (born 1941), writer
- Émile-Félix Gautier (1864–1940), geographer
- Charles Victor Naudin (1815–99), naturalist and botanist

== Publications ==
- A. Veyret (1878). Collège Chaptal (ed.). Collège Chaptal. Leçons élémentaires de dessin géométrique (in French). Paris: Dauvin.
- A. Veyret (1881). Collège Chaptal (ed.). Collège Chaptal. Leçons de dessin géométrique (in French). Paris: impr. de Duval.
- Collège Chaptal, ed. (1895). Le livre du cinquantenaire (1844-1894) (in French). Paris: A. Hennuyer. p. 11.
- Ferdinand Brunot (1924). Collège municipal Chaptal (ed.). Discours prononcé par M. Ferdinand Brunot,... à la distribution des prix (in French). p. 12.

== Sources ==
- Abrams, Dennis (2009-01-01). Nicolas Sarkozy. Infobase Publishing. ISBN 978-1-4381-1987-8.
- Anouilh, Jean (2000-12-14). Antigone. A&C Black. ISBN 978-0-413-69540-6.
- Arnold, Matthew (1868). Schools and Universities on the Continent. Macmillan and Company. p. 89.
- Assad, Arjang A.; Gass, Saul I. (2011-06-28). Profiles in Operations Research: Pioneers and Innovators. Springer Science & Business Media. ISBN 978-1-4419-6281-2.
- Cathé, Philippe; Douche, Sylvie; Duchesneau, Michel (2010). Charles Koechlin: compositeur et humaniste. Vrin. ISBN 978-2-7116-2316-7.
- Chauvin, Victor (1866). Histoire des lycées et collèges de Paris: Suivie d'un appendice sur les principales institutions libres et d'une notice historique sur le concours général... Hachette.
- "Classement 2015 des prépas ECS". L'Étudiant (in French).
- "Classement 2015 des prépas LSH". L'Étudiant (in French).
- "Classement 2015 des prépas MP". L'Étudiant (in French).
- "Classement 2015 des prépas PC". L'Étudiant (in French).
- "Classement 2015 des prépas PSI". L'Étudiant (in French).
- "Classement 2015 des prépas PT". L'Étudiant (in French).
- "Classement 2015 des prépas PCPST". L'Étudiant (in French).
- Desanges, Paul (April–June 1975). "Chronique d'une communauté militante: Les Forgerons (1911-1920)". Le Mouvement Social (91, Culture et militantisme en France: De la Belle Époque au Front Populaire). Editions l'Atelier on behalf of Association Le Mouvement Social: 35–58. doi:10.2307/3807287. JSTOR 3807287.
- Duplan, E. (1891). "Le Collège Chaptal". L'enseignement primaire public à Paris (in French). Paris: Direction de l'enseignement primaire, Seine (France). Imprimerie Chaix.
- Kiddle, Henry; Schem, Alexander Jacob (1879). The Year-book of Education for 1878 [and 1879]. E. Steiger.
- Knapp, Bettina Liebowitz (1997-01-01). Pierrette Fleutiaux. Rodopi. ISBN 90-420-0372-3.
- Knight, Edward Henry (1880). Reports of the United States Commissioners to the Paris Universal Exposition, 1878. Published Under Direction of the Secretary of State by Authority of Congress. U.S. Government Printing Office.
- Larrue, Jacques; Payen, Jean-Marie (2000). Jean Ramadier: gouverneur de la décolonisation. KARTHALA Editions. ISBN 978-2-84586-011-7.
- Le Baron, Yves (1998). "Faits historiques" (in French). Lycée Chaptal.
- "Lycée Chaptal - Paris 08". L'Express.
- Magill, Frank N. (2013-05-13). "André Breton". The 20th Century A-GI: Dictionary of World Biography. Routledge. ISBN 978-1-136-59334-5.
- Mairie de Paris (2012). "The Petit-Palais Mosaics". Patryst.
- Ministère de l'éducation nationale (1893). Bulletin officiel du Ministère de l'éducation nationale (in French). Ministère de l'éducation nationale.
- Pouillon, François (2012). Dictionnaire des orientalistes de langue française. KARTHALA Editions. ISBN 978-2-8111-0790-1.
- Schatzman, Evry L. (1989). La science menacée. Odile Jacob. ISBN 978-2-7381-0044-3.
- Society of Arts (1868). "Technical and Scientific Education". Edinburgh Review, Or Critical Journal. L. Scott.
