= Air Transport Command (disambiguation) =

Air Transport Command was a United States Air Force unit created during World War II.

Air Transport Command may also refer to:

- I Troop Carrier Command, known as "Air Transport Command, United States Army Air Forces" from 30 April 1942 to 30 June 1942
- Canadian Forces Air Transport Command, the "Air Transport Command" of the 'Canadian Armed Forces' of Canada
- European Air Transport Command, a coordinating centre in Europe for five European armed forces founded 2010

== See also ==
- RAF Transport Command, Royal Air Force
- Military Air Transport Command, French Air Force
- Military Transport Aviation, Soviet Air Forces
