= Air Force Training Command (France) =

The Air Force Training Command (Commandement des ecoles de l'armee de l'air, CEAA) was a major command of the French Air Force.

It was created to replace the 5th Bureau of the Air Staff for the training of personnel by decree 62-290 of March 15, 1962. It was previously located at Vélizy – Villacoublay Air Base (BA 107).

It was responsible for training all new air force personnel as well as on the technical and on the job training of the other air force personnel, as well as the officers and NCO training. CEAA was also responsible for all schools and training facilities.
