= Bernard Cottret =

French historian (1951–2020)

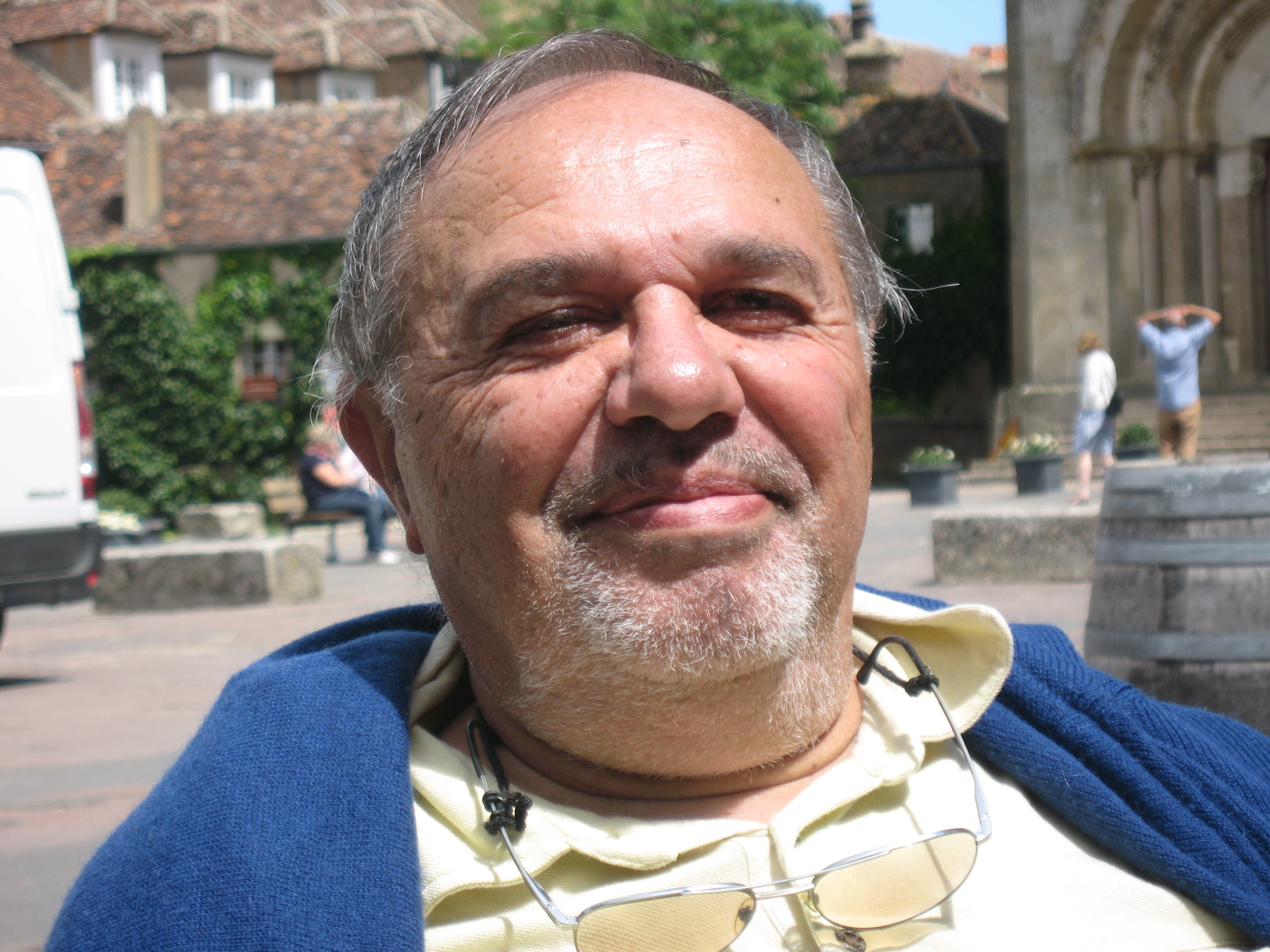
- Born: 1951; Boulogne-Billancourt, France
- Died: July 13, 2020 (aged 69)
- Education: École Normale Supérieure Lettres et Sciences Humaines; Paris West University Nanterre La Défense
- Occupation: Academic
- Employer: Versailles Saint-Quentin-en-Yvelines University
- Known for: Historian and literary scholar
- Website: http://bernardcottret.monsite-orange.fr/

Bernard Cottret (1951 – July 13, 2020) was a French historian and literary scholar.

== Biography ==
Stemming from a family of artists and musicians, Bernard (Jean) Cottret is the son of Bernard Cottret (1923–2011) and Geneviève Aurel († 1999), classical singers and soloists. His only son Yann is also a musician. He studied at the lycée Descartes in Rabat and at the lycée Chaptal in Paris, where he met his wife, Monique Cottret, née Astruc, also a historian, before graduating from the École Normale Supérieure Lettres et Sciences Humaines. Serving as a linguist at the Centre de Langues et Etudes Etrangères Militaires in 1977–78, he left the army as a lieutenant in the French reserve and after a few years at the Sorbonne and at the university of Lille, as assistant- and then as full professor, he was from 1992 to 2011 professor of British civilization and history at the Versailles Saint-Quentin-en-Yvelines University, where he is now Professor Emeritus. He is now retired and lives in the country; he is also an occasional lay preacher in the United Protestant Church of France. He founded and chaired the department of humanities of his university, and established close links with the College of Charleston, SC, where he held a summer seminar in 1994. Cottret is also a fellow of the Institut Universitaire de France, and a member of the Institut de Recherches sur les Civilisations de l'Occident Moderne, Paris-Sorbonne. Cottret is the author and editor of more than forty volumes, which address the history of the British Isles, colonial America, France and Europe in a comparative perspective. He also authored fifty chapters in various books and forty articles in academic journals, not to mention numerous radio or television interviews and broadcasts. Some of these contributions have been translated into English, German, Dutch, Spanish, Italian, Portuguese, Polish, Japanese, Korean, Turkish and Georgian. Several essays deal with the Protestant Reformation and religious issues, in relation with politics. He has given over 250 lectures in France, Ireland, Britain, the Netherlands, Switzerland, Germany, the Czech Republic, Canada and the United States. He has organized annual summer seminars in partnership with Potsdam and some Polish associates.

== Works ==
It is primarily as a historian that he approached the Protestant Reformation, reading Lucien Febvre and benefiting from the enlightened teachings of Robert Mandrou and Elisabeth Labrousse. Jean Delumeau and Emmanuel Le Roy Ladurie have also greatly influenced him at a later stage; the friendship of Jean Malaurie, of Laurent Theis, of Marianne Carbonnier, Bertrand Van Ruymbeke and some others have confirmed his intellectual and spiritual acumen, favoring freedom of expression and thought over conformism and political correctness. The Huguenots in England, published in 1991, uses the French Protestant diaspora to understand English society in the early modern period. In 1993, Christopher Hill welcomed in Renaissance Quarterly (Renaissance Quarterly) "a very interesting book, on a subject insufficiently explored by English-speaking historians. Professor Cottret begins with some useful remarks, of contemporary relevance, on immigration, past and present, and problems of adaptation, both for the immigrants and for the host country. In England the Huguenot churches maintained their cultural independence at the price of firm control by pastors and elders, striving to preserve the purity of Calvinist doctrine against the temptations of a differently authoritarian Anglican church and of the easier-going dissenting congregations”. He went on “for English-speaking readers the main interest of the story lies in the new angle of vision which it offers on English social development in the sixteenth and seventeenth centuries". Renaissance Quarterly, Vol. 46, No. 4 (Winter, 1993), pp. 831–832. The American edition of Calvin: A Biography (2000) was well received and described by the publication of The Institute on Religion and Public Life as the best of recent biographies.

== Awards ==
From 1988 to 2002, Bernard Cottret was a member of the steering committee of the Bibliothèque nationale de France. In 1988 he defended at the Paris West University Nanterre La Défense a thesis in English literature dedicated to Bolingbroke who became for eighteenth-century Frenchmen the typical "philosophe anglois" and greatly influenced Voltaire and Montesquieu. It led, at the request of Jonathan Clark, to a book in English devoted to the political work of Bolingbroke, and the Conservative Enlightenment.

The Académie française awarded several of his books (Monseigneur-Marcel history prize, silver medal in 1992 for Cromwell, François-Millepierres history prize in 2003 for the La Révolution américaine). He also received in 1997 the prix Budget from the Académie des Inscriptions et Belles-Lettres for Calvin, and more recently with his wife Monique Cottret, the Académie des sciences morales et politiques 2006 award Pierre-Georges Castex for French Literature for Jean-Jacques Rousseau en son temps. In July 2011 The Académie des Sciences Morales et Politiques awarded him the Charles-Aubert-Histoire prize for the whole of his historical productions.

Bernard Cottret was among the founders of the Prix national du livre médiéval : Provins patrimoine mondial (National Book award medieval : Provins World Heritage), which first went to Michel Pastoureau for his book L’Ours, histoire d’un roi déchu (The Bear story of a fallen king) in September 2007. That same year, he was appointed a member of the André Kaspi Committee on public commemorations, by the defense secretary in charge of veterans. He later participated in the 2012 Jean-Jacques Rousseau committee for national celebrations at the Ministry of Culture. His notice is published in Contemporary Authors and Who's Who in France

== Bibliography ==
- Terre d’exil. L’Angleterre et ses réfugiés (Exile. England and its refugees), Aubier, Paris, 1985. (ISBN 2700722043)
- La Glorieuse Révolution d’Angleterre, 1688 (The Glorious Revolution of England, 1688), Gallimard, Paris, 1988. (ISBN 2070712605)
- Le Christ des Lumières. Jésus, de Newton à Voltaire (Christ the Enlightenment. Jesus, from Newton to Voltaire), Le Cerf, Paris, 1990, réédition CNRS, 2011. (ISBN 2204040983)
- (in Italian) Il cristo dei Lumi, Morcelliana, Brescia, 1992.
- The Huguenots in England. Immigration and Settlement c.1550-1700, Cambridge University Press, Cambridge, 1991.
- Cromwell, Fayard, Paris, 1992.
- Bolingbroke, exil et écriture au siècle des Lumières. Angleterre-France (vers 1715-vers 1750) (Bolingbroke exile and writing in the Enlightenment. England-France (1715-1750)), Paris, Klincksieck, 1992.
- 1598, l’Édit de Nantes. Pour en finir avec les guerres de religion (1598, the Edict of Nantes. To end the wars of religion), Perrin, Paris, 1997. (ISBN 9782262012083)
- Bolingbroke's Political Writings. The Conservative Enlightenment, Basingstoke, Macmillan 1997, 436 p.; id., New York, St Martin's Press, 1997, 436 p.
- John Calvin, W.B.Eerdmans, Grand Rapids (Mich.), 2000.
- Henri VIII. Le pouvoir par la force (Henri VIII, power by force), Payot, Paris, 2005. (ISBN 2360510169)
- La Renaissance, 1492-1598. Civilisation et barbarie (The Renaissance, 1492–1598. Civilization and barbarism), Éditions de Paris, Paris, 2000. (ISBN 2-84621-001-2)
- Histoire de la Réforme protestante (History of the Protestant Reformation), Perrin, Paris, 2001. (ISBN 2262032327)
- Du patriotisme aux nationalismes (1700-1848) (From patriotism to nationalism (1700-1848)), Créaphis, Paris, 2002. (ISBN 2-913610-23-4)
- La Révolution américaine (The American Revolution), Perrin, Paris, janvier 2003. Version poche Tempus, 2004. (ISBN 2-262-01821-9)
- Jean-Jacques Rousseau, en son temps (Jean-Jacques Rousseau in his time) (with Monique Cottret), Perrin, Paris, 2005. (ISBN 2262021287)
- Cosmopolitismes, patriotismes. Europe et Amérique 1773-1802 (Cosmopolitanisms, patriotism. Europe and America 1773-1802), Rennes, Les Perséides, 2005, 216 p. With Marc Belissa. (ISBN 978-2-915596-10-6)
- Le Jardin. Figures et métamorphoses (Garden. Figures and metamorphoses), Dijon, EUD, 2005, 316 p. With Anne-Marie Brenot. (ISBN 2915552320)
- Convertir/Se convertir. Regards croisés sur l’histoire des missions chrétiennes (Convert/To convert. Perspectives on the History of Christian Missions), Paris, Nolin, 2006, 202 p., with Jan Borm, Jean-François Zorn. (ISBN 2910487288)
- Sainte ou sorcière ? L’héroïsme chrétien au féminin (Saint or witch? Women and Christian heroism), Paris, Éditions de Paris, 2006. With V. Alemany, M. Cottret, 272 p. (ISBN 2-84621-076-4)
- Histoire de l’Angleterre. De Guillaume le Conquérant à nos jours (History of England. From William the Conqueror to the Present), Paris, Tallandier, janvier 2007, 610 p. (ISBN 978-2-84734-262-8)
- Naissance de l’Amérique du Nord, Actes fondateurs 1607-1776 (Birth of North America, founding acts 1607-1776 ), Paris, Indes savantes, 2008. (ISBN 2846542007)
- La République et le Royaume (Republicanism and the Kingdom of God), Éditions de Paris, Paris, 2008. (ISBN 2846211116)
- Calvin. Traité des reliques (Calvin. Treatise on Relics), Éditions de Paris, Paris, 2008. (ISBN 2846211108)
- La royauté au féminin. Élisabeth Ire d'Angleterre (Queenship and Royalty. Elizabeth I of England), Paris, Fayard, 2009. (ISBN 2213643172)
- Karl Marx, une vie entre romantisme et révolution (Karl Marx, a life between Romanticism and Revolution), Perrin, Paris, 2010. (ISBN 226203270X)
- Savoir et pouvoir au siècle des Lumières (Knowledge and Power at the Time of the Enlightenment), Éditions de Paris, 2011 (With J. Borm and Monique Cottret). (ISBN 978-2-84621-147-5)
- Jean-Jacques Rousseau, Lettre à Christophe de Beaumont (Jean-Jacques Rousseau, letter to Christophe de Beaumont), Gollion, Infolio, 2012, with Monique Cottret. (ISBN 978-2-88474-859-9)
- Thomas More. La face cachée des Tudors (Thomas More. The hidden face of the Tudors), Tallandier, 2012. (ISBN 2847348034)
- La révolution anglaise, une rébellion britannique, Perrin, 2015. (ISBN 9782262036393)
- Ces reines qui ont fait l'Angleterre, Tallandier, 2016.
- Le siècle de l'édit de Nantes, CNRS éditions, 2018.
