= Escadron de Transport 60 =

Transport Squadron 60 (Transportation, Training and Calibration Squadron 65)
- Escadron de Transport 60 (Escadron de transport, d'entrainement et de calibration 65)
- Country: France
- Branch: French Air and Space Force
- Type: Military transport aircraft
- Role: Transport

The Escadron de transport, d'entraînement et de calibration 00.065 (ETEC 65, "Transportation, training and calibration squadron") is a unit of the French Air and Space Force, under direct command of the Minister of Defence, in charge of the transportation of the President, the Prime Minister and other French government officials.

== History ==
In July 1945, the GAEL (groupe aérien d'entraînement et de liaison) was created. It was first based at Le Bourget Airport, then relocated to the Villacoublay Air Base.

In 1969, the GAEL was split in two units, then in 1984 in three units.

In 1991, the three units were merged again into the l'ETEC 00.065 (escadron de transport, d'entraînement et de calibration), which was still called "GAEL".

In July 1995, the French president Jacques Chirac decided to dissolve the Groupe de Liaisons Aériennes Ministérielles (GLAM). The GLAM's aircraft were transferred to the ETEC.

== Aircraft ==
The ETEC uses

- 1 Airbus Airbus A330-200, Registration: F-RARF
- 2 Dassault Falcon 7X
- 2 Falcon 900 (soon to be replaced),
- Falcon 2000LX
- 7 Socata TBM 700,
- 3 Eurocopter Super Puma helicopters (VIP-configured)

In 2003, the ETEC provided 673 flight hours for the President, 516 for the Prime Minister, 602 for the Ministry of Foreign Affairs and 318 for the Ministry of Defence. A flight hour typically costs:

- €4050 for an Airbus,
- €5750 for a Falcon 900 and
- €4090 for a Falcon 50.

Flight are identified as "COTAM 0xy", with the callsign "COTAM 001" ("COTAM Unité") being reserved for the President and "COTAM 002" for foreign presidents.

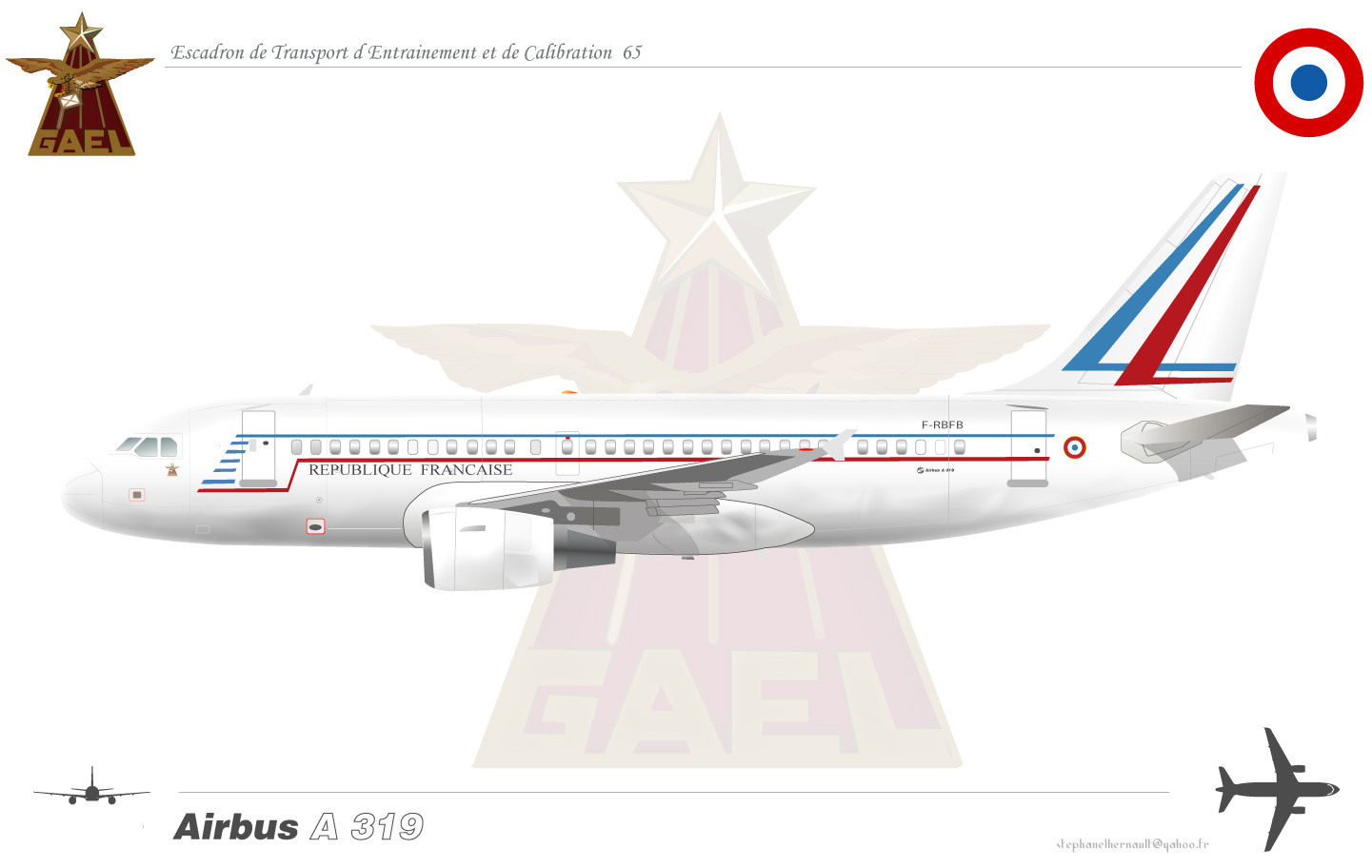
Airbus A319

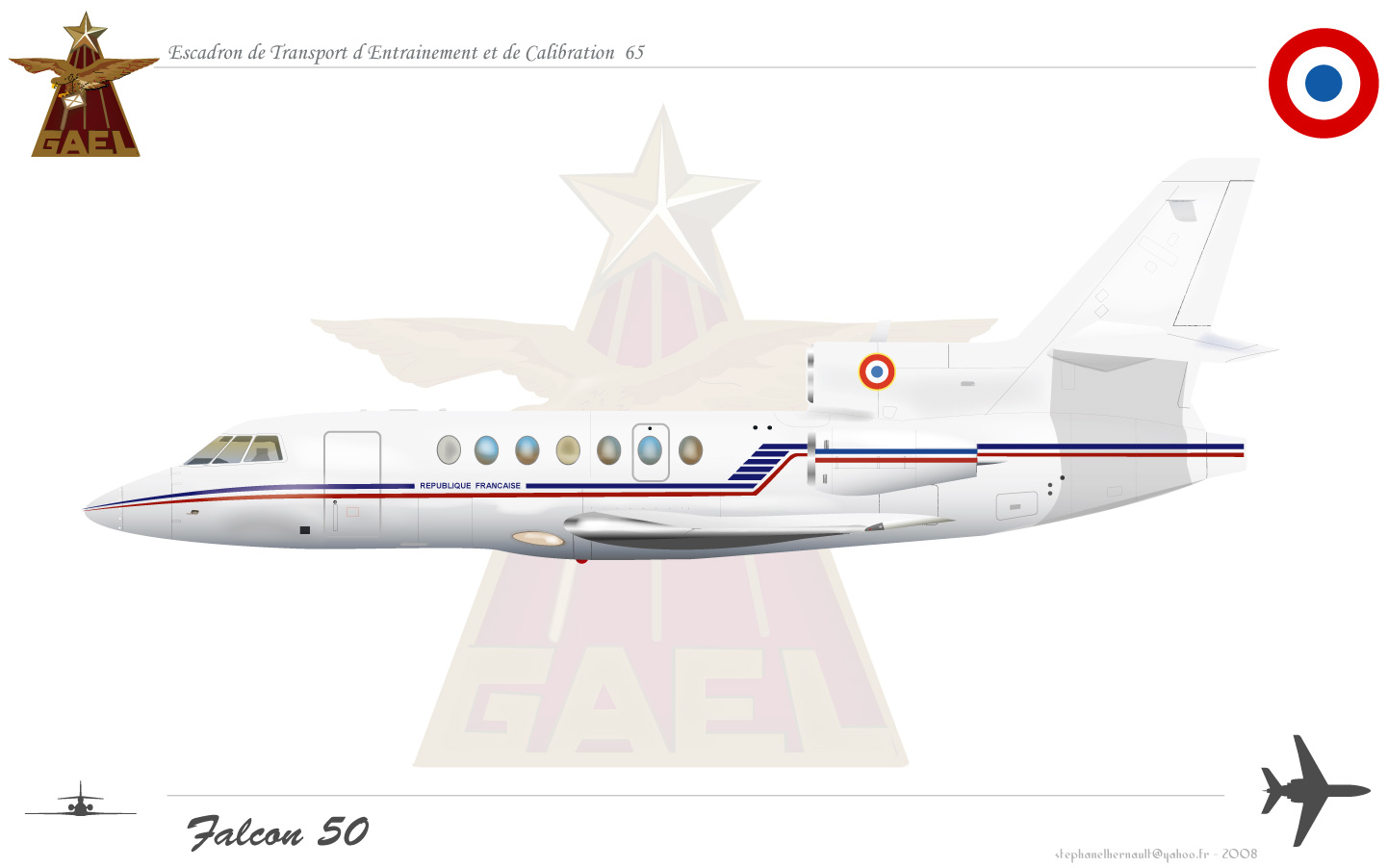
Dassault Falcon 50

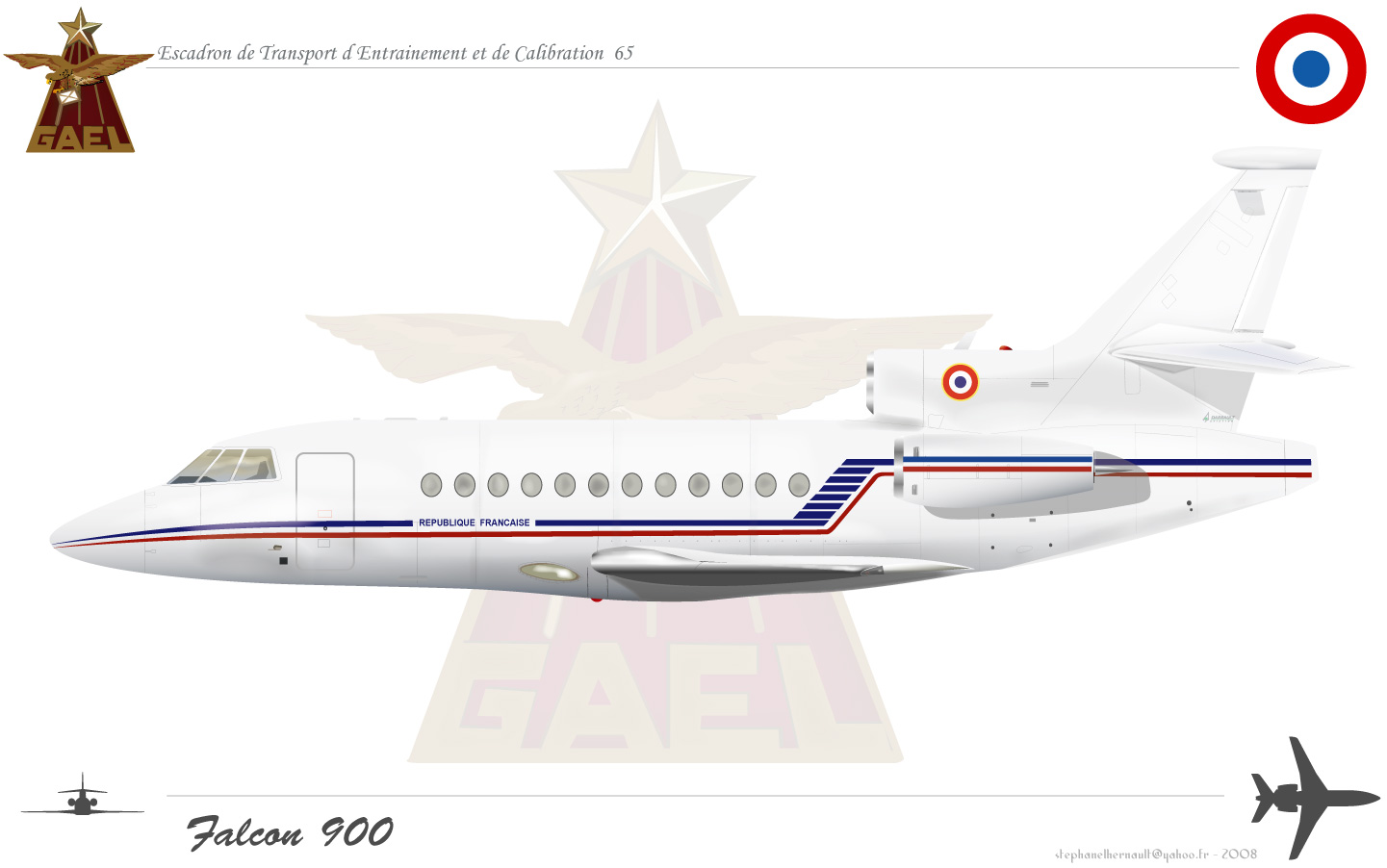
Dassault Falcon 900

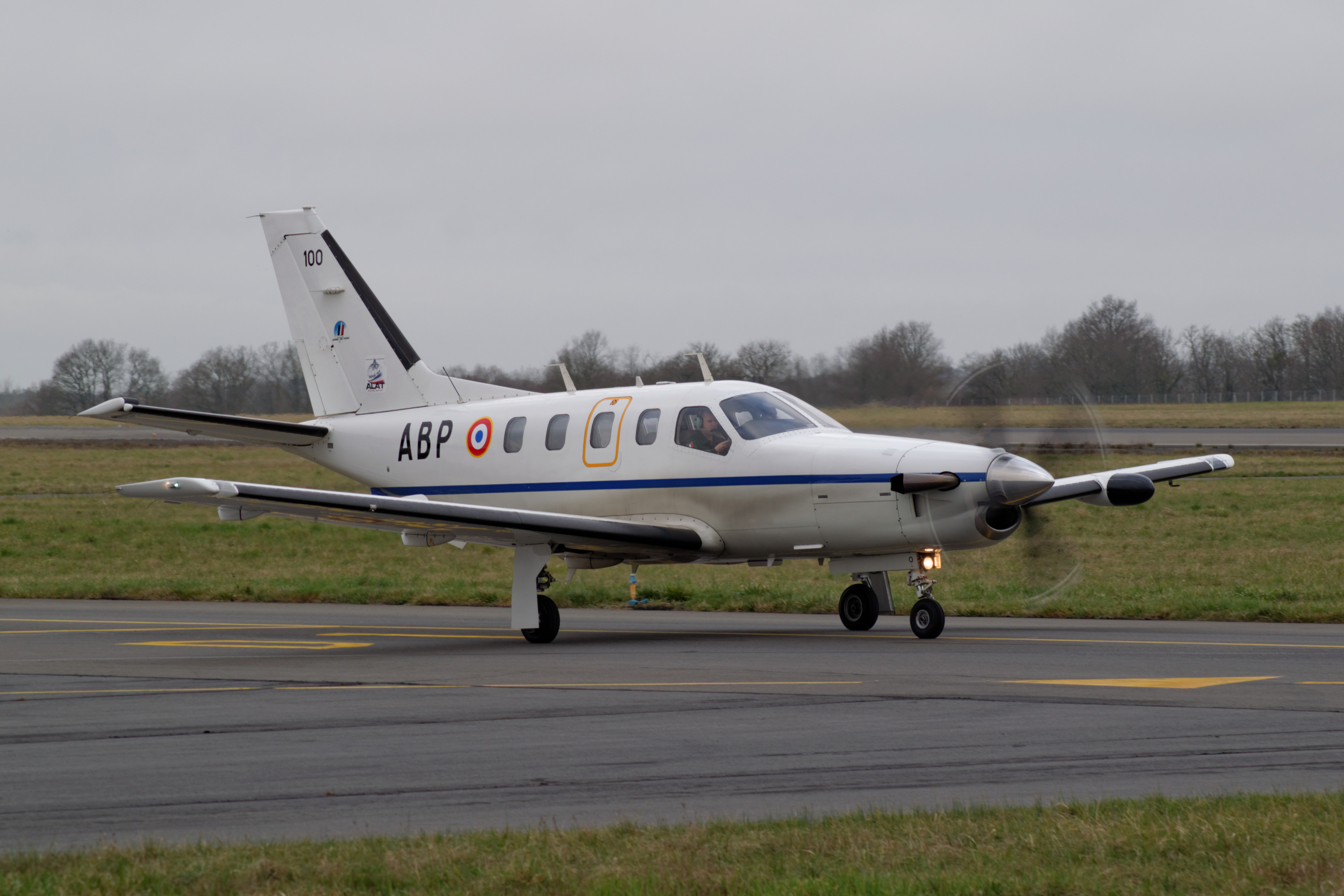
Socata TBM 700

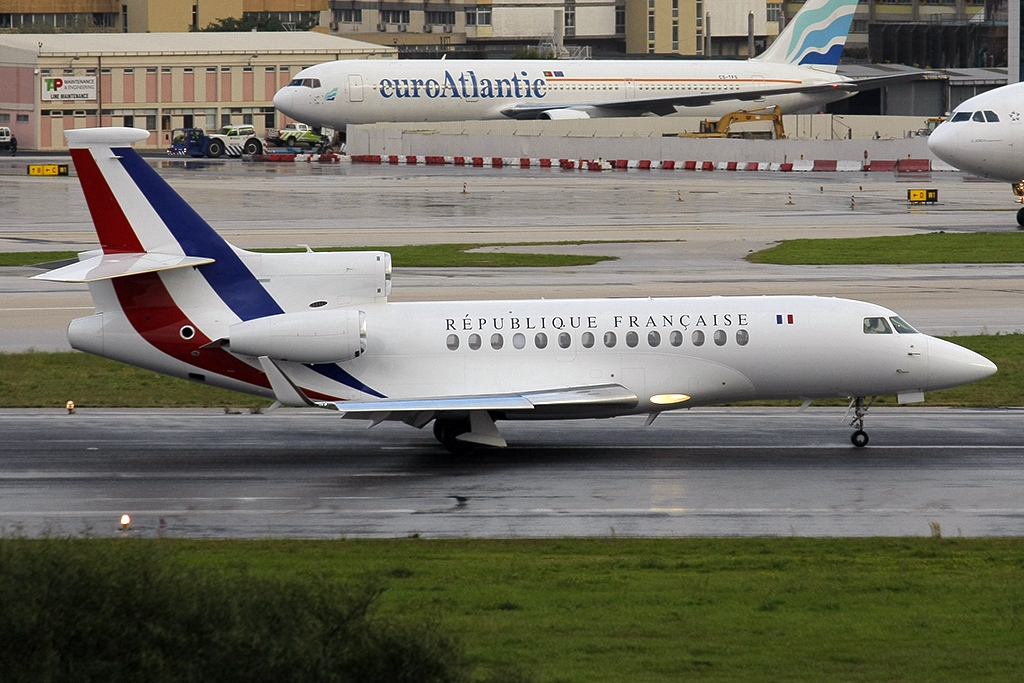
Dassault Falcon 7X

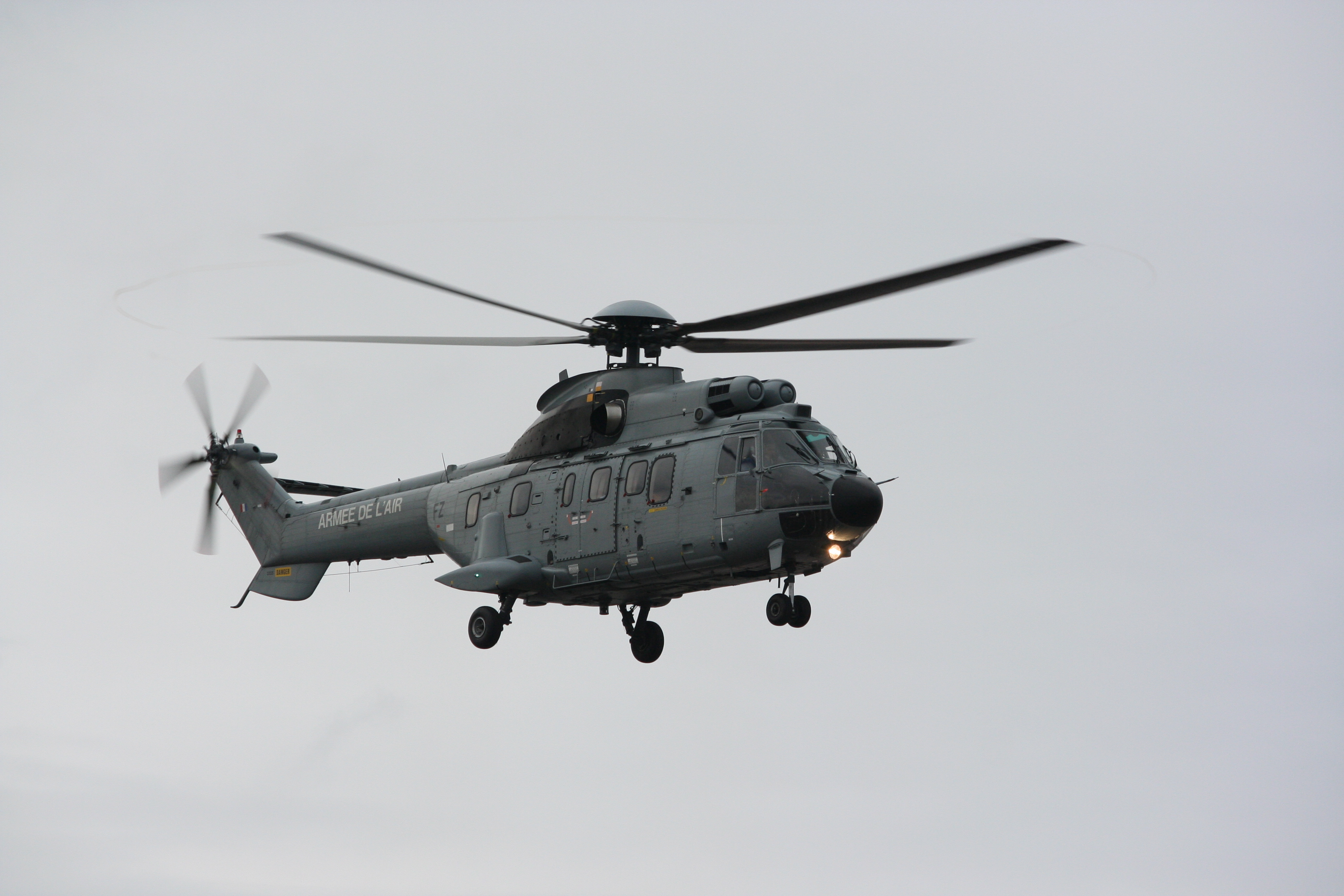
Eurocopter AS332

== See also ==
- List of air transports of Heads of State and Government
- List of French Air and Space Force aircraft squadrons
