= Alfred de Pischof =

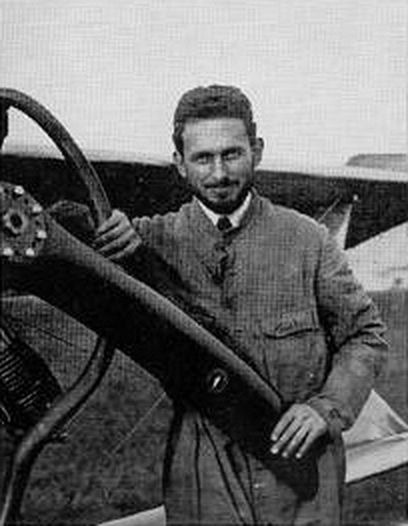
- Born: 17 May 1882; Vienna, Austria
- Died: 12 August 1922 (aged 40); Villacoublay, France
- Other names: Alfred Ritter von Pischof

Alfred de Pischof (17 May 1882 – 12 August 1922) was an Austrian aviation pioneer. From 1901 to 1907, he attended the Collége Chaptal and École Speciale des Travaux Publics in Cachan (near Paris), France and studied road and railway engineering; his grandfather had been a railway specialist. De Pischof had also been interested in aircraft technology, and he often visited Charles and Gabriel Voisin. By 1906, Alfred had created his own glider and by 1907, his first biplane. In 1909, De Pischof returned to Austria, and worked as designer for Werner & Pfleiderer. He designed the Pischof-Autoplan; this aircraft first flew in March 1910, flying for 400 metres. On 24 April 1910, he earned his pilot's certificate.

After the First World War, De Pischof returned to France and focused on small aircraft. He died when he crashed an aircraft during testing.
