= Astra C =

French single engine aircraft

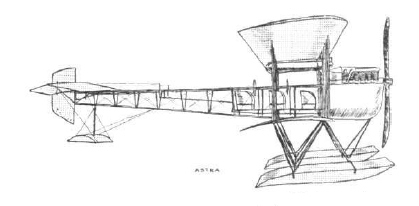
- Astra CM Hydro-avion

General information
- Type: Sports plane and observation aircraft
- Manufacturer: Société Astra

History
- First flight: 1912

The Astra C was a 1912 French single engine biplane, manufactured by Société Astra at Villacoublay. In 1913, the Astra CM Hydro-avion three-seat floatplane version was used to make the world's first scheduled passenger-carrying flights.

== Design and development ==
The Astra C was initially designed as a single seat biplane, powered by a single 50 hp Renault engine in tractor configuration. It was constructed primarily as wooden framework sections, covered in canvas and wire-braced. The fuselage was of triangular cross section, with a wheeled main undercarriage plus nose skid and tail skid. The wings were of unequal span, and employed wing-warping for roll control.

The Astra CM was developed from the Astra C, with a more powerful engine and added accommodation for two observers, for military reconnaissance.

The Astra Hydro, (an Astra CM 'Hydro-avion' (seaplane)), was a further development in 1913, with a 75 kW (100 hp) Renault V-12 engine and 3 Tellier floats (2 main floats 4.5 m × 1.15 m (14.8 ft × 3.8 ft), and one small tail float). The wooden frame elements were largely replaced by steel tubes, and the wing ribs and floats were the principal remaining wooden components. at least two were built and an order for two from the Royal Navy (RN), serialled 106 and 107, was not completed.

== Operational history ==
During the St. Malo races, 14-26 August 1912, the first CM Hydro was flown to first place by Labouret. The second CM Hydro, powered by a horizontally mounted 82 kW (110 hp) Salmson M.9 water-cooled radial engine, flew at Monaco but crashed.

On 22 March 1913, using at least one Astra CM Hydro-avion, French operator Compagnie générale transaérienne started the world's first scheduled passenger-carrying flights, operating from Cannes to Nice. Two passengers could be carried. On 29 March 1913, the service was extended to Monte Carlo.

== Variants ==
Astra C
Civil version, with 50 hp Renault engine.
Astra CM
Military version, with 75 hp Renault or 75 hp Chenu engine.
Astra Hydro
Floatplane version of the Astra CM, with 100 hp Renault engine.

== Operators ==
France

- Compagnie générale transaérienne

Greece

- Royal Hellenic Navy
  - Hellenic Naval Air Service

== Specifications (Astra CM) ==
General characteristics

- Crew: one pilot
- Capacity: two observers
- Length: 10.97 m (36 ft 0 in)
- Wingspan: 12.32 m (40 ft 5 in)
- Wing area: 48.2 m^{2} (519 sq ft)
- Empty weight: 673 kg (1,484 lb)
- Gross weight: 1,000 kg (2,200 lb)
- Powerplant: 1 × Renault , 63 kW (85 hp)

Performance

- Maximum speed: 85 km/h (53 mph, 46 kn)

== Bibliography ==
- Thomas, Andrew. "In the Footsteps of Daedulus: Early Greek Naval Aviation". Air Enthusiast, No. 94, July–August 2001, pp. 8–9. ISSN 0143-5450
