= Military Air Transport Command =

The Military Air Transport Command (COTAM) (French: Commandement du transport aérien militaire) was a command of the French Air Force. It was formed in February 1962 from the Groupement d'Unités Aériennes Spécialisées and disbanded on 11 March 1994, when it became Commandement de la Force Aérienne de Projection (CFAP). Larousse Encyclopedia Online says the headquarters was at Vélizy – Villacoublay Air Base.

== Structure 1985 ==
In 1985, the Air Force had four major flying commands, among which was the Military Air Transport Command. CoTAM counted 28 squadrons: Ten fixed-wing transport squadrons included:

- ET 1/60
- ET 3/60
- fr:Escadron de transport 1/61 Touraine
- ET 2/61
- ET 3/61
- ET 1/63
- ET 2/63
- ET 1,2,/64
- ET 3/64 (Transall NG) (Évreux)
- ET 1/65 (Villacoublay)
- ET 2/65 (Villacoublay)

The remainder were helicopter and liaison squadrons, at least five of which were overseas, including six Escadrons de Transport Outre Mer (Overseas Transport Squadrons):

- fr:Escadron d'hélicoptères 1/67 Pyrénées (Cazeux Air Base)
- EH 2/67 (Metz)
- EH 3/67 (Villacoublay)
- EH 4/67 (Apt)
- EH 5/67 (Istres)
- Escadron de Transport Outre Mer 50 (Réunion)
- Escadron de Transport Outre Mer 52 (Nouméa, New Caledonia)
- Escadron de Transport Outre Mer 55 (Léopold Sédar Senghor International Airport, Dakar, Senegal)
- ETOM 58 (Fort-de-France)
- ETOM 82 (Papette)
- ETOM 88 (Djibouti)
- CIEH 341 (Chambéry, moved later to Toulouse-Francazal)
- ELA 41 (Metz)
- ELA 43 (Bordeaux)
- ELA 44 (MS.760 Paris, Broussard, Nord 262) (Aix)
- ELAS 1/44 at Solenzara Air Base, Corsica)

== Senior leader transport ==
The acronym COTAM was used to designated flights carrying important French leaders:

- COTAM 0001 : President of the French Republic.
- COTAM 0002 : Prime Minister of France.
- COTAM 0003 : Minister of Defence (France).
- COTAM 0004 - 0009 : High ministerial authorities.
- COTAM 0010 - 0099 : high authorities of the state.

While the acronym of the French military air command is now CFAP, the abbreviation COTAM continues to be used as a call sign of French military transport aircraft.

== See also ==
- fr:Escadron d'hélicoptères 01.044 Solenzara - Solenzara helicopter unit from c.1988
