= Pierrette Fleutiaux =

French writer (1941–2019)

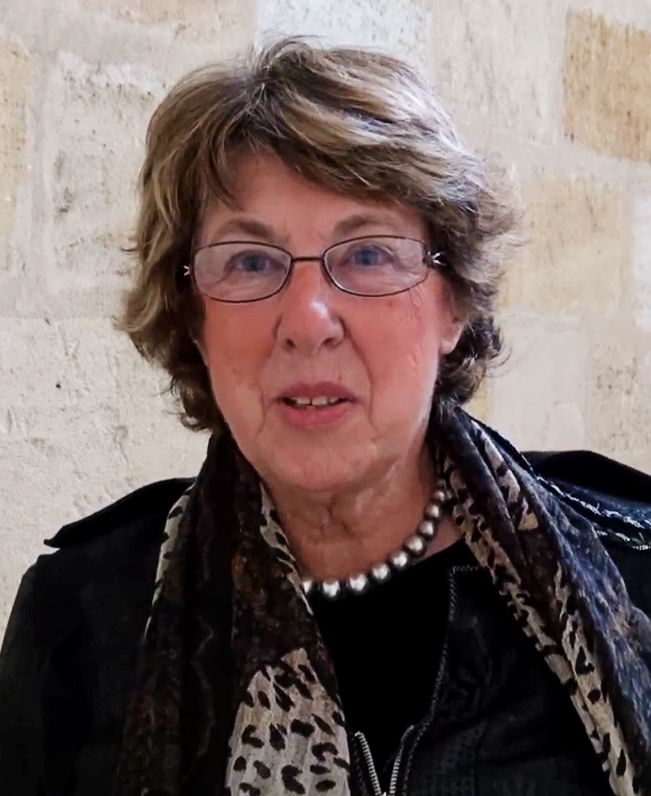
- Born: 9 October 1941; Guéret
- Died: 27 February 2019 (aged 77); Paris
- Writing career
- Language: French
- Genre: woman
- Notable work: Nous sommes éternels
- Notable awards: Prix Femina
- Website: www.pierrettefleutiaux.com

Pierrette Fleutiaux (French pronunciation: [pjɛʁɛt fløtjo]; 9 October 1941, in Guéret – 27 February 2019, in Paris) was a French writer. Her awards include the 1985 Prix Goncourt de la Nouvelle for Métamorphoses de la reine, and winner of the 1990 Prix Femina for Nous sommes éternels.

== Bibliography ==
- Histoire de la chauve-souris, Julliard, Paris, 1975
- Histoire du gouffre et de la lunette, Julliard/Actes Sud, Paris, 1976
- Histoire du tableau, Gallimard, Paris, 1977
- La Forteresses, Julliard, Paris, 1979
- Les Étoiles à l’envers, Actes Sud, Paris, 19xx
- Métamorphoses de la reine, Gallimard, Paris, 1985
- Nous sommes éternels, Gallimard, Paris, 1990; English translation We Are Eternal by Jeremy Leggett, 1994.
- Sauvée, Gallimard, Paris, 1993
- Allons nous être heureux, Gallimard, Paris, 1994
- Mon frère au degré X, École des loisirs, Paris, 1995
- Trini fait des vagues, Gallimard, Paris, 1997
- La Maison des voyages (with Alain Wagneur), Gallimard, Page Blanche, 1997
- Trini à l’île de Pâques, Gallimard, Paris, 1999
- L’Expédition, Gallimard, Paris, 1999
- Des phrases courtes, ma chérie, Actes Sud, Arles, 2001, 2003
- Le Cheval Flamme, Calmann-Levy and RMN, Paris
- Les Amants imparfaits, Actes Sud, Arles, 2005
- Les Étoiles à l'envers, New York photoroman, photographs of JS Cartier, Actes Sud, 2006
- L’Os d'Aurochs, illustrations Christine Guinamand, Éditions du Chemin de fer, 2007
- La Saison de mon contentement, Actes Sud, Arles, 2008
- Bonjour, Anne: Chronique d'une amitié, Actes Sud, Arles, 2010
- Loli le temps venu, Odile Jacob, 2013
