= Cotam 001 =

French presidential plane

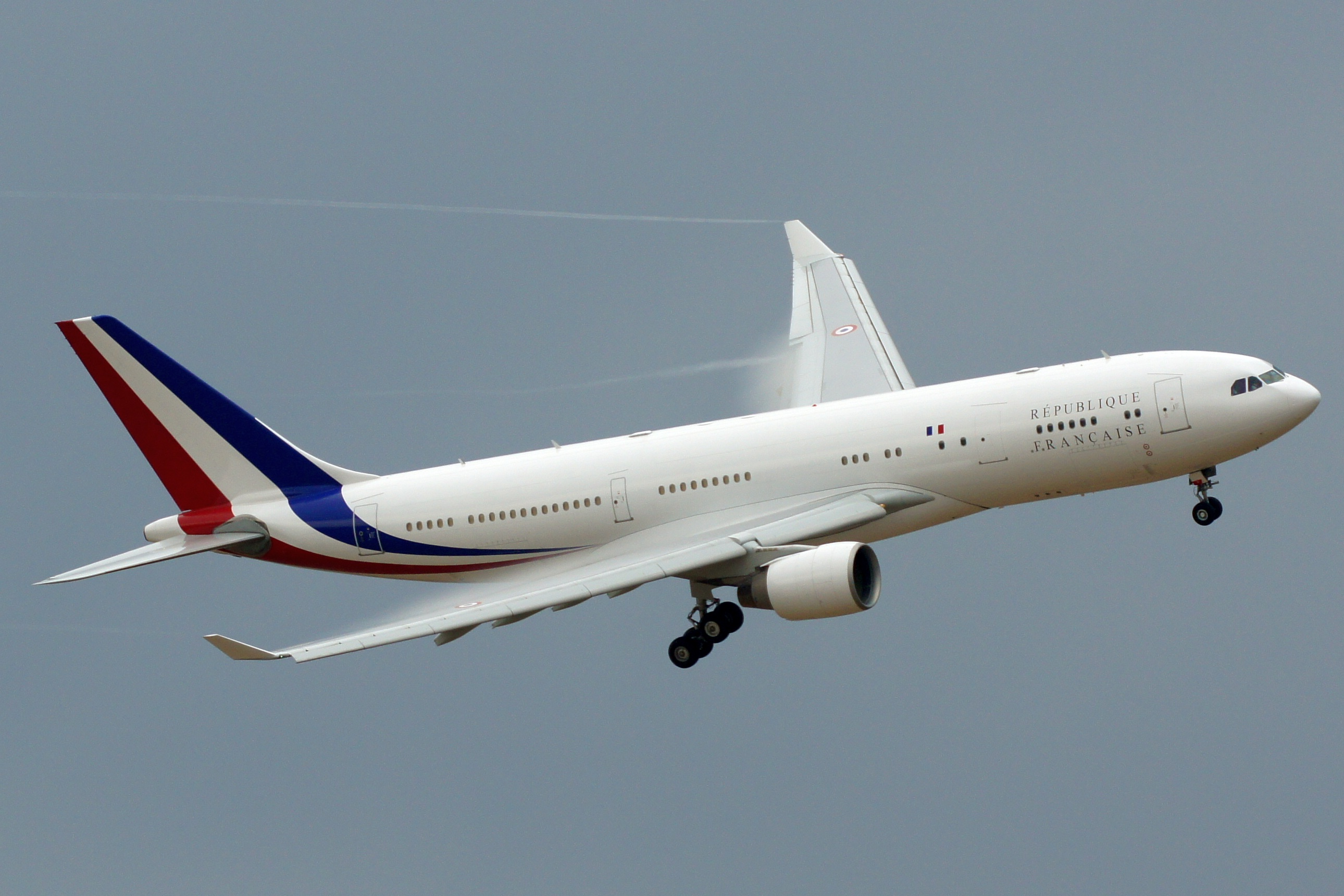
Current French presidential aircraft, an Airbus A330-200 (F-RARF).

Cotam Unité is used as the air traffic control call sign of any French Air and Space Force aircraft carrying the President of France. From the 1960s to 1994, COTAM was the acronym for the French Air Force's Military Air Transport Command (Commandement du transport aérien militaire). In November 2010, the Governmental transport squadron (ETEC 65) received a newly refurbished Airbus A330 ordered by the government to be used as the presidential (or prime ministerial) aircraft replacing two Airbus A319. The Transport Squadron ET/060 also has the following aircraft for VIP transport:

- 2 Falcon 7X: F-RAFA, F-RAFB
- 2 Falcon 900 (to be retired): F-RAFP, F-RAFQ
- 2 Falcon 2000: F-RAFC, F-RAFD
- 7 TBM 700,
- 2 Super Puma helicopters (2233, 2235)

In addition to the ET/060 operated Aircraft, Esterel Transport squadron also provides VIP transport using the following aircraft:

- 3 Airbus A310-300
- 2 Airbus A340-200
