= Société Astra =

French manufacturer of balloons, airships, and aeroplanes

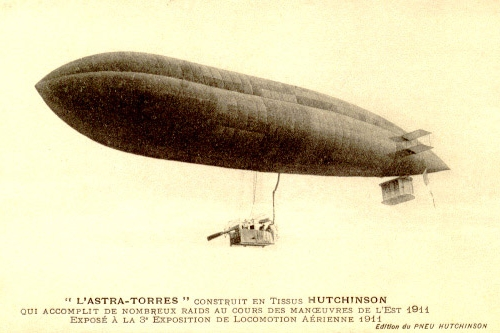
Airship Astra-Torres built in 1911

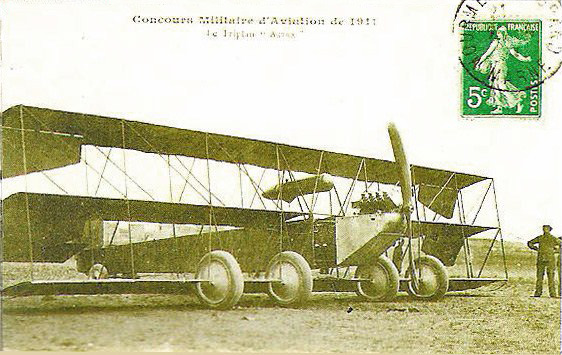
Astra triplane, 1911

Société Astra des Constructions Aéronautiques was a major French manufacturer of balloons, airships, and aeroplanes in the early 20th century. It was founded in 1908 when Henri Deutsch de la Meurthe purchased Édouard Surcouf's workshops at Billancourt. Its most significant product was the Astra-Torres airship designed by Spanish engineer Leonardo Torres Quevedo, but beginning in 1909, the firm also produced Wright brothers heavier-than-air designs under licence. In 1912, these were supplanted by Astra's own designs, the Astra C and CM.

== Astra Clément-Bayard ==
Astra Clément-Bayard was established in 1908 by Astra and French industrialist Adolphe Clément-Bayard, to manufacture airships at a new factory in La Motte-Breuil in response to a French Army decision to commence airship operations. Astra provided the envelope and Clément-Bayard provided the gondola and engine.

The Clément-Bayard No.1 airship was offered to the French government but was rejected as too expensive so it was bought by Tsar Nicholas II for the Russian army.

== Demise ==
In 1921, the firm was absorbed by Nieuport.
