= Clive Pearson =

British aviation executive and industrialist

Major the Hon. Bernard Clive Pearson
- Born: 12 August 1887; Kensington, London, England
- Died: 22 July 1965; Worthing, Sussex, England
- Education: Rugby School; Trinity College, Cambridge
- Occupations: Aviation executive; industrialist
- Known for: Consolidating British Airways Ltd; chairman of BOAC
- Spouse: Hon. Alicia Mary Dorothea Knatchbull-Hugessen (m. 1915)
- Children: 3
- Parent(s): Weetman Pearson, 1st Viscount Cowdray; Annie Pearson, Viscountess Cowdray

Bernard Clive Pearson (12 August 1887 – 22 July 1965), commonly known as Clive Pearson, was a British aviation executive and industrialist. As chairman of Whitehall Securities, the Pearson family investment company, he helped consolidate several private British airlines into British Airways Ltd in 1935. British Airways Ltd became the principal privately backed British airline operating European and domestic services before the Second World War, alongside the state-supported Imperial Airways, which concentrated on Empire routes.

Pearson succeeded Sir John Reith as chairman of British Overseas Airways Corporation (BOAC) in January 1940, having previously served as deputy chairman. BOAC began operations on 1 April 1940 after the merger of British Airways Ltd and Imperial Airways, and operated wartime services under the control of the Air Ministry. Pearson and most of BOAC's civilian directors resigned in 1943 after disputes over the corporation's independence and its wartime subordination to military transport needs.

Pearson was also chairman of S. Pearson & Son from 1927 to 1954 and led the Pearson group's role in the 1931 rescue of Lazard Brothers & Co.

== Early life and education ==
Pearson was born in Kensington, London, on 12 August 1887, the second son of the industrialist Weetman Pearson, 1st Viscount Cowdray and Annie Pearson, Viscountess Cowdray. He was educated at Rugby School and Trinity College, Cambridge, where he graduated BA in engineering in 1908.

== Military service ==
During the First World War, Pearson served in the Sussex Yeomanry and reached the rank of major.

== Aviation career ==
=== Whitehall Securities and private airline consolidation ===
Pearson's influence in aviation came through Whitehall Securities, the Pearson family investment company. Whitehall Securities held or acquired interests in several aviation businesses during the 1920s and 1930s, including Spartan Aircraft, Spartan Air Lines and United Airways Limited.

The opportunity to consolidate private British airlines increased after the death in 1934 of Edward Henry Hillman, founder of Hillman's Airways. Whitehall Securities acquired a controlling interest in Hillman's Airways, and on 30 September 1935 Hillman's Airways, Spartan Air Lines and United Airways were amalgamated as Allied British Airways Ltd. The company changed its name to British Airways Ltd on 29 October 1935 and became a public company with capital exceeding £245,000. The new airline began operations on 1 January 1936 from Heston Aerodrome, inheriting a combined fleet of more than 40 aircraft.

British Airways Ltd consolidated a fragmented private-airline sector into a larger competitor to Imperial Airways. Hillman's had operated services including Paris and Brussels, Spartan served the Isle of Wight, and United Airways served routes to the north west of England and the Isle of Man. As integration proceeded, British Airways Ltd focused increasingly on continental services and route rationalisation, in line with the recommendations of the Maybury Committee on British air transport. British Airways Ltd was further expanded through the acquisition of British Continental Airways and Crilly Airways, strengthening its position on continental European services.

Pearson also expanded the group's aviation interests in Scotland. In 1937 he acquired Northern & Scottish Airways and Highland Airways, which were merged to form Scottish Airways.

=== Munich Crisis flights ===
British Airways Ltd gained public prominence during the Munich Crisis of September 1938, when Prime Minister Neville Chamberlain used its aircraft for his flights to Germany to meet Adolf Hitler. Chamberlain's first flight from Heston to Munich on 15 September 1938 was the first occasion on which a British prime minister flew on official business.

Following Chamberlain's return from his second visit to Hitler, he wrote to Pearson on 25 September 1938 thanking him for the "excellent travelling arrangements made by British Airways" and praising the "speed, safety and comfort" of the flights. Chamberlain described himself as "an inexperienced air-traveller" and said the journeys had shown him what he "had not previously thought possible".

=== BOAC chairman ===
The British Overseas Airways Corporation Act 1939 merged British Airways Ltd and Imperial Airways into British Overseas Airways Corporation (BOAC). Sir John Reith, formerly chairman of Imperial Airways, became BOAC's first chairman and remained in post until January 1940. Pearson, who had served as deputy chairman during the transition, succeeded him as chairman before BOAC began operations on 1 April 1940.

BOAC inherited Imperial Airways' long-distance Empire network and British Airways Ltd's European and domestic experience, but wartime conditions immediately changed its role. British Airways' corporate history records that BOAC operated wartime services "under the control of the Air Ministry". During Pearson's chairmanship the corporation maintained overseas air links under severe constraints, including shortages of aircraft, crews and spares, and the diversion of resources to military needs.

In 1943 Pearson and most of the civilian directors resigned. A House of Lords debate on 15 April 1943 described the resignations as arising from a long-running dispute over BOAC's independence and wartime role. Lord Rothermere argued that BOAC was at risk of becoming an organisation "which had in fact been taken over by the Army Transport Command", while Lord Reith said the corporation had faced persistent frustration over aircraft, personnel, supplies and its inability to deal directly with the Royal Air Force. Pearson's resignation letter stated: "The proposed arrangements, however, result in a situation which is indefinite for the Corporation and which does little to improve the difficult conditions in which the Corporation has operated throughout its existence."

The issue remained controversial in Parliament. In a further Lords debate on 12 May 1943, Rothermere argued that the resignations arose from earlier disputes over civil aviation policy and BOAC's responsibility for the future of British air transport, rather than merely from the creation of RAF Transport Command.

== S. Pearson & Son and Whitehall Securities ==
Pearson became chairman of the family firm S. Pearson & Son in 1927, after the death of his father. He also became chairman of Whitehall Securities, the investment company formed by his father to hold the Pearson group's non-construction interests.

By the time Pearson became chairman, the Pearson group had moved beyond its civil-engineering origins into a diversified structure with interests in publishing, oil, electricity, finance, steel and transport. During his chairmanship the construction arm declined in relative importance, while Whitehall Securities became a vehicle for investment in aviation and other strategic industries.

=== Lazard Brothers rescue ===
In 1931 Pearson led a critical financial rescue of Lazard Brothers & Co., in which S. Pearson & Son already held a major stake. The London-based accepting house faced bankruptcy following fraud at its Brussels office, where a Czech trader had concealed losses of £5.85 million through unauthorised foreign-exchange speculation. When confronted, the trader committed suicide, leaving Lazard Brothers technically insolvent with liabilities nearly twice its stated capital.

Over a weekend of negotiations with the Bank of England, Pearson secured emergency financing to prevent the bank's collapse on the following Monday morning. The rescue package required him to pledge S. Pearson & Son's assets as collateral for a £3 million Bank of England loan at penalty rates, while additional support came from Lazard's Paris and New York houses and from UK tax refunds. The Bank considered the rescue necessary to prevent panic in the City of London, given Lazard's status as a prominent accepting house.

As a result of the rescue, S. Pearson & Son's ownership of Lazard Brothers increased to about 80 per cent. The stake remained a major Pearson group asset until Pearson plc sold its Lazard interests in 1999 for £410 million.

== Historic estates ==
In 1921, Pearson's father purchased the mostly derelict Castle Fraser in Aberdeenshire and gave it to Pearson as a restoration project. Pearson restored the castle and later gave it to his second daughter, Lavinia.

In 1922 Pearson bought Parham House & Gardens, an Elizabethan country house in West Sussex. He and his wife Alicia restored the house and assembled a collection of furniture, textiles and paintings. Parham opened to the public in 1948 after the Second World War and has been described by the estate as one of the first private houses in England to open formally to visitors.

== Personal life ==
On 14 October 1915 Pearson married Alicia Mary Dorothea Knatchbull-Hugessen, daughter of Edward Knatchbull-Hugessen, 1st Baron Brabourne. They had three daughters:

- Veronica Pearson (1916–1993), who married Marcus Rueff in 1940. Marcus died in action in 1941. She married Patrick Tritton in 1950 and later inherited Parham.
- Lavinia Pearson (1919–1991), who married Major Charles Michael Smiley and was the mother of Miranda Guinness, Countess of Iveagh. She wrote and illustrated children's books.
- Elisabeth Dione Pearson (1920–2012), who married Patrick Gibson, Baron Gibson and later became Lady Gibson.

Pearson died at Worthing, Sussex, on 22 July 1965 and was buried at St Peter's Church, Parham.

== Legacy in aviation ==
Pearson's aviation significance lay chiefly in finance and organisation. Through Whitehall Securities he helped consolidate Britain's private airline sector in the 1930s, creating British Airways Ltd as the main private-sector counterpart to Imperial Airways. Through BOAC he then chaired the successor corporation at the point when British civil aviation was converted into a wartime strategic transport system. British Airways Ltd and Imperial Airways formed part of the corporate lineage that later led to the modern British Airways, created in 1974 from BOAC and British European Airways.
