= Whitehall Securities =

British holding company of the Pearson group

- Industry: Holding company
- Founded: 1907
- Headquarters: Great Britain
- Parent: Pearson plc

Whitehall Securities Corporation Ltd was a British holding company within the Pearson group. Incorporated on 30 December 1907, it became a vehicle for Pearson family investments outside the original construction business, especially in aviation, aircraft manufacturing and ceramics. Its aviation interests included Airwork Services, Spartan Aircraft, Spartan Air Lines, United Airways Limited, Hillman's Airways, British Airways Ltd and Saunders-Roe.

The company was renamed Pearson Management Services Limited on 1 January 1991 and remains an active subsidiary of Pearson plc.

== History ==
Whitehall Securities Corporation Ltd was incorporated on 30 December 1907 by Weetman Pearson and his son Harold Pearson, with capital of £1,000,000. It formed part of the wider Pearson group, whose business interests were moving beyond civil engineering into oil, utilities, finance, newspapers and other investments.

After the First World War and the sale of a controlling interest in Mexican Eagle Petroleum Company, the Pearson group increasingly used holding companies to manage investments outside the declining construction arm. In 1919 the group created Whitehall Trust Ltd as a finance and issuing house, with Sir Robert Kindersley as chairman, while Whitehall Securities acted as the principal holding company for non-construction assets.

Whitehall Securities was closely associated with Bernard Clive Pearson, who became chairman of S. Pearson & Son after the death of his father in 1927 and used the group’s investment capital to build a significant position in British civil aviation.

== Aviation interests ==
=== Airwork and early aviation investments ===
Whitehall Securities entered aviation as part of the Pearson group’s wider shift from construction into transport, finance and industrial investment. In 1929 it became a financial backer of Airwork Services, a private aviation company founded by Nigel Norman and Alan Muntz the previous year.

Whitehall also held interests in Spartan Aircraft and its airline subsidiary Spartan Air Lines. These holdings placed it in both aircraft manufacture and airline operation during the period when British civil aviation remained fragmented among small private operators and state-supported Imperial Airways.

=== British Airways Ltd ===
Whitehall Securities' most important aviation role was the consolidation of several private airlines into British Airways Ltd. In April 1935 Whitehall Securities and Jersey Airways formed United Airways Limited as a sister airline to Spartan Air Lines. Whitehall also acquired a controlling shareholding in Hillman's Airways, which had become a public company after the death of its founder Edward Henry Hillman in December 1934.

On 30 September 1935, Hillman's Airways, Spartan Air Lines and United Airways were amalgamated as Allied British Airways Ltd. The company changed its name to British Airways Ltd on 29 October 1935 and became a public company on 11 December 1935 with capital exceeding £245,000. It began operations on 1 January 1936 from Heston Aerodrome, with a combined fleet of more than 40 aircraft.

British Airways Ltd served mainly European and domestic routes, while Imperial Airways focused on Empire services. British Airways Ltd later expanded through the acquisition of British Continental Airways on 1 August 1936 and the absorption of Crilly Airways the following month. Whitehall Securities was joined as an investor in the merged airline by the French banking company Émile Erlanger & Co., through its chairman Leo d'Erlanger.

Whitehall’s financial involvement in British Airways Ltd ended when the airline was merged with Imperial Airways under the British Overseas Airways Corporation Act 1939 to form British Overseas Airways Corporation (BOAC), which began operations on 1 April 1940. The merger marked the absorption of Whitehall-backed private airline consolidation into a state overseas-airline structure.

=== Scottish Airways ===
Whitehall Securities also purchased two Scottish independent airlines, Northern & Scottish Airways and Highland Airways. On 12 August 1937 they were merged to form Scottish Airways. Scottish Airways later played a wartime transport role and was merged into British European Airways in 1947 during the post-war nationalisation and reorganisation of British civil aviation.

=== Saunders-Roe and aircraft manufacturing ===
Whitehall Securities was also connected to aircraft manufacturing through Saunders-Roe, the Isle of Wight aircraft and marine-engineering company. The Pearson group took a large stake in Saunders-Roe in 1931 and merged it with Spartan Aircraft in 1933. During the Second World War Saunders-Roe maintained Catalina flying boats and produced Supermarine Walrus and Sea Otter aircraft for Supermarine.

After the war Saunders-Roe experimented with jet flying boats, including the SR.A/1, and developed the large Princess flying boat before changing airline economics reduced the prospects for large water-based aircraft. In 1951 it acquired the Cierva Autogiro Company and moved into helicopter production, manufacturing the Saunders-Roe Skeeter and contributing to the later Scout and Wasp helicopter line.

In 1959 Saunders-Roe produced the SR.N1, the first practical hovercraft, based on the work of Christopher Cockerell and built for the National Research Development Corporation. In the same year S. Pearson & Son sold Saunders-Roe to Westland Aircraft as part of a government-backed rationalisation of the British aircraft industry.

=== Post-war aviation interests ===
Whitehall Securities retained an aviation presence after the nationalisation of British Airways Ltd and Scottish Airways. In 1960 Airwork changed its name to British United Airways after Whitehall Securities agreed that Airwork could use the United Airways name with the prefix "British". Whitehall Securities held 10 per cent of the new British United Airways group.

== Ceramics and Allied English Potteries ==
Whitehall Securities and the Pearson group also built a substantial ceramics interest after the Second World War. In 1951 Whitehall purchased the Lawley Group, a china and glassware retailer and pottery owner. Whitehall already owned Booths and Colcloughs and several other ceramic and pottery businesses.

In 1953 the Lawley, Booths and Colclough interests were administratively combined. In 1955 Ridgway & Adderleys and Booths & Colclough were amalgamated as Ridgway Potteries. In 1964 the Pearson group acquired Thomas C. Wild & Sons Ltd and the enlarged Lawley Group was renamed Allied English Potteries. Its subsidiaries included Ridgway Potteries, Swinnertons, Royal Crown Derby, Thomas C. Wild & Sons and, from 1966, Shelley China.

The ceramics group underwent restructuring during the 1960s. In 1966 Shore & Coggins Ltd and Chapmans (Longton) Ltd, both subsidiaries of Thomas C. Wild & Sons, were closed to allow expansion of the Royal Albert and Paragon brands. In 1971 the Pearson group purchased Doulton & Co. Ltd, owner of Royal Doulton, and Allied English Potteries became a subsidiary of Royal Doulton. From 1973 many of the Allied English Potteries businesses were brought under the Royal Doulton Tableware structure.

== Relationship with other Pearson holdings ==
Whitehall Securities should be distinguished from other Pearson group companies using the Whitehall name. Whitehall Trust was created in 1919 as a finance and issuing house, while Whitehall Securities functioned as a holding company for non-construction assets.

The wider Pearson group also held interests in banking, oil, utilities, newspapers and other industries. Some of these were held or managed through other group entities, including S. Pearson & Son, Whitehall Trust and sector-specific companies. The Pearson group's stake in Lazard Brothers & Co., for example, became one of its major financial assets after the 1931 rescue of the London accepting house, but the stake is usually described in sources as belonging to the Pearson group or S. Pearson & Son rather than specifically to Whitehall Securities.

== Name change and later status ==
Whitehall Securities Corporation Ltd changed its name to Pearson Management Services Limited on 1 January 1991. Companies House lists Pearson Management Services Limited as an active private limited company, incorporated on 30 December 1907, with the business activity "activities of other holding companies not elsewhere classified". Pearson plc is listed as the person with significant control, holding 75 per cent or more of the shares and voting rights and the right to appoint or remove directors.

== Historical significance ==
Whitehall Securities is historically significant as a Pearson group holding company that helped move the family business away from its origins in civil engineering. In aviation, it provided capital and organisational support for the consolidation of British private airlines into British Airways Ltd before those interests were absorbed into BOAC. In aircraft manufacturing, its connection with Saunders-Roe placed it within the development of British flying boats, helicopters and hovercraft, before government-backed aircraft-industry rationalisation ended Pearson ownership of the company. In ceramics, it formed part of the Pearson group's post-war consolidation of pottery businesses into Allied English Potteries and later Royal Doulton.
