= United Airways Limited =

Airline of the United Kingdom (Apr 1935–Sept 1935)

United Airways Ltd.
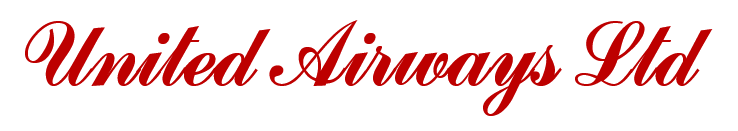
- Founded: April 1935
- Commenced operations: April 1935
- Ceased operations: 30 September 1935 (merged with Spartan Air Lines and Hillman's Airways to form British Airways Ltd)
- Operating bases: Stanley Park Aerodrome, Blackpool
- Destinations: Isle of Man; Glasgow; London; Carlisle
- Parent company: Channel Islands Airways
- Headquarters: Blackpool
- Key people: Walter Thurgood; Bernard Clive Pearson

United Airways Ltd was a British airline operating in 1935, ending as part of British Airways Ltd.

== History ==
Whitehall Securities Corporation was a wealthy investment company run by Bernard Clive Pearson. He was interested in aviation, and invested in Metal Propellers Ltd in 1925, and in Airwork Ltd in 1929. He also invested in Simonds Aircraft in 1928, renaming it Spartan Aircraft Ltd in 1930. Pearson then took a 50% share in Saunders-Roe (SARO) and combined the two companies to produce the Spartan Cruiser airliner. To promote the Cruiser Pearson founded Spartan Air Lines on 2 February 1933, which on 12 April started services from Heston Aerodrome to the Isle of Wight.

Meanwhile, Walter Thurgood was making good profits with Jersey Airways, and was starting another airline, Guernsey Airways. On 1 December 1934, Pearson, along with Great Western Railway and Southern Railway formed a holding company called Channel Islands Airways Ltd to control both airlines, with Whitehall Securities and Thurgood holding two thirds of the shares.

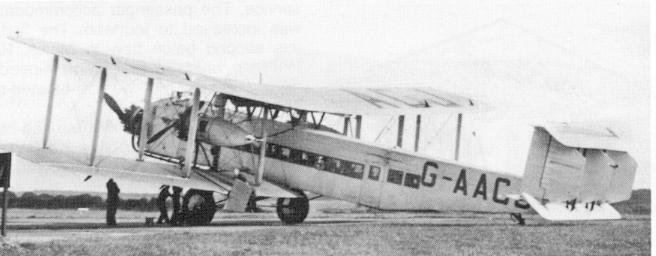
Armstrong Whitworth Argosy of United Airways

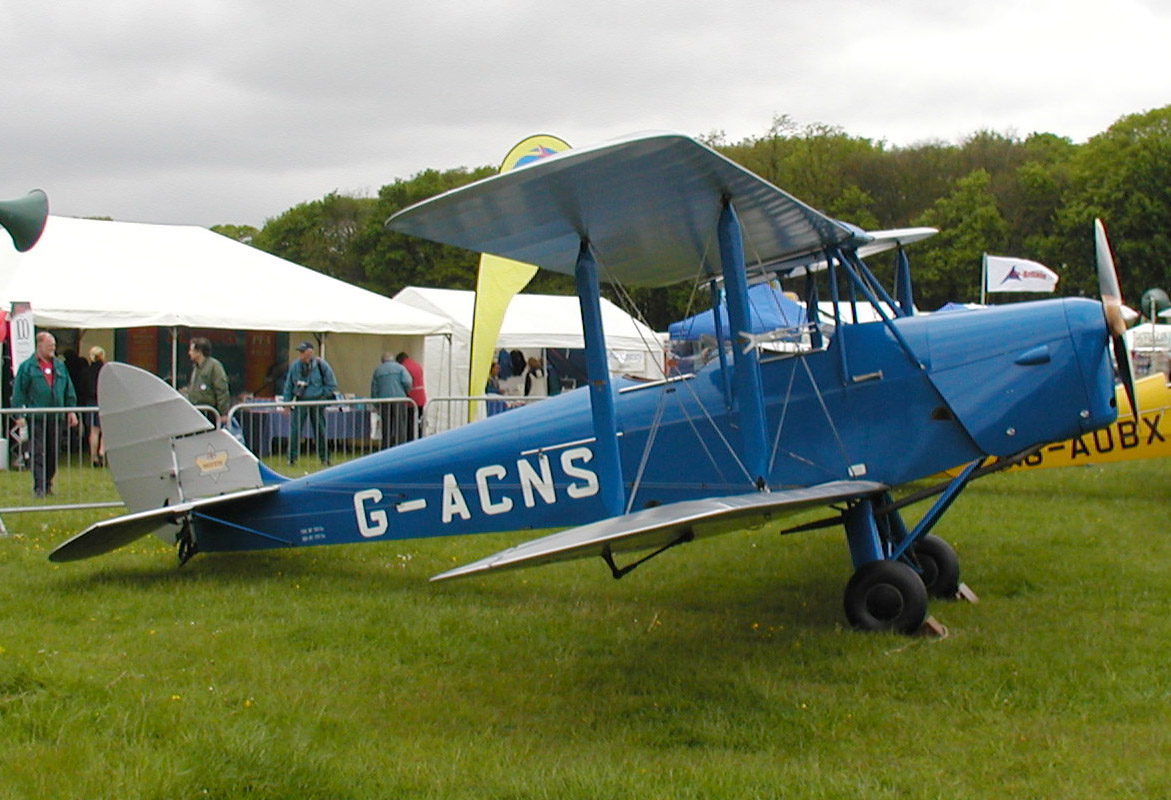
De Havilland DH.60GIII Moth Major G-ACNS in 2003, the only surviving United Airways aircraft

Wanting to expand northwards. Pearson then founded United Airways on 4 April 1935 through Channel Islands Airways, with Thurgood in charge. The fleet was to consist of several Spartan Cruisers from Spartan Air Lines, and newly-ordered de Havilland Dragon Rapides, all of which held six to eight passengers. There were also some pleasure-flying aircraft which would be particularly popular at Blackpool in the coming holiday season.

On 30 April United started services from Spartan’s base at Heston to Blackpool and onwards to the Isle of Man and Carlisle (Kingstown Municipal Airport), with a link by Northern & Scottish Airways (N&SA) from the Isle of Man to Glasgow. In May, Whitehall took a controlling interest in N&SA, and although United included its Western Isles routes as an associate airline, it was never formally part of United. In June 1935 United did take Highland Airways under its wing, but it retained its own identity and a degree of independence.

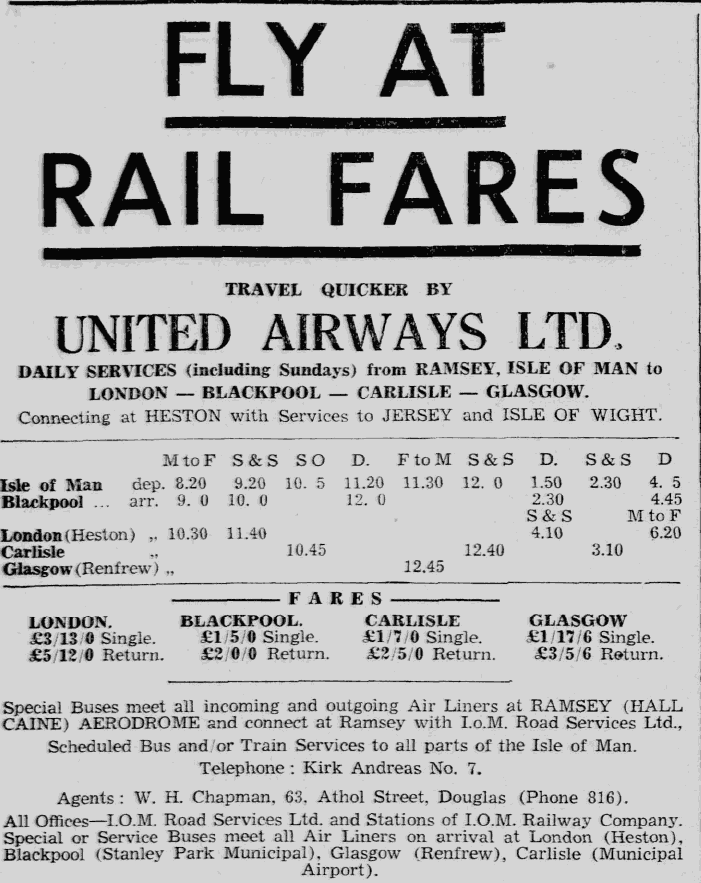
United Airways Timetable for operations from Hall Caine Airport, 1935.

On 18 June United Airways operated daily services between Blackpool and Leeds, the Isle of Man and Liverpool, and Blackpool and Morecambe. United had taken over the lease of Blackpool's Stanley Park Aerodrome and were running it for the town's Corporation. They were also in talks with the independent Hillman's Airways to run services from London to Amsterdam and Berlin and possibly to Norway.

United Airways lasted less than five months, until 30 September 1935, when under Pearson’s command, Spartan and United along with Hillman's Airways, all combined into one new company, Allied British Airways. That itself only lasted one month, as it was renamed British Airways Ltd on 29 October, and it became a public company on 11 December.

== Routes ==
United Airways routes as in timetable dated 18 June 1935. "In conjunction with Northern & Scottish Airways" and "Connections available with Isle of Wight and Jersey air services".

- Heston — Blackpool — Isle of Man (twice daily)
- Isle of Man — Blackpool — Liverpool (thrice daily)
- Isle of Man — Blackpool — Morecambe (twice daily)
- Blackpool — Leeds (daily)
- Isle of Man — Carlisle (daily, twice on Saturdays)
- Isle of Man — Glasgow (N&SA - daily)
- Glasgow — Campbeltown — Islay (N&SA - daily)

== Fleet list ==
United Airways Ltd fleet, 1935
Type	Registration	From	To	Fate	Notes
Armstrong Whitworth Argosy II	G-AACJ	July 1935	1 October 1935	Transferred to BAL	The last remaining Argosy, ex Imperial Airways City of Manchester. Used mainly for pleasure flights at Blackpool. Withdrawn from use by December 1936
de Havilland DH.60G Gipsy Moth	G-AAYY	5 July 1935	1 October 1935	Transferred to BAL	Probably used jointly with Spartan AL as instrument trainer. Impressed as MA939
de Havilland DH.60GIII Moth Major	G-ACNS	2 May 1935	October 1935	Transferred to BAL	Sold to Airwork Ltd in 1937. Still registered in 2024
de Havilland DH.89 Rapide	G-ADAE	18 April 1935	1 October 1935	Transferred to BAL	Delivered new to N&SA with United Airways titles, registered to United in May 1935. Sold abroad in 1938
DH.89 Rapide	G-ADBU	29 April 1935	1 October 1935	Transferred to BAL	Delivered new. Later to N&SA. Withdrawn from use in 1936
DH.89 Rapide	G-ADBX	4 July 1935	1 October 1935	Transferred to BAL	Delivered new. Crashed at Ronaldsway 6 May 1936 and withdrawn from use
Spartan Three-Seater II	G-ABTR	27 July 1935	October 1935	Transferred to BAL	Ex Spartan AL, sold by BAL April 1947, scrapped at Gatwick 1947
Spartan Cruiser II	G-ACDX	30 April 1935	October 1935	Transferred to BAL	Ex Spartan AL. On a BAL ferry flight, written off in forced landing near Gosport 9 October 1935.
Spartan Cruiser II	G-ACSM	April 1935	October 1935	Transferred to BAL	Ex Spartan AL. Later to N&SA and Scottish Airways, impressed as X9433, scrapped April 1942
Spartan Cruiser II	G-ACYL	April 1935	October 1935	Transferred to BAL	Ex Spartan AL. Later to N&SA and Scottish Airways, impressed as X9431, struck off charge November 1941
Spartan Cruiser II	G-ACZM	May 1935	October 1935	Transferred to BAL	Ex Spartan AL. Later to N&SA and Scottish Airways, withdrawn from use at Renfrew January 1940, scrapped April 1942

Two further Rapides were originally registered to United Airways, G-ADBV and G-ADBW, but never delivered; they were diverted to Jersey Airways.

The fleet livery was plain silver or white with red markings.

== Accidents and incidents ==
There are no recorded accidents or incidents to United Airways aircraft.

== See also ==
- List of defunct airlines of the United Kingdom
