= Northern & Scottish Airways =

Scottish regional airline (1934–1937)

Northern & Scottish Airways Ltd
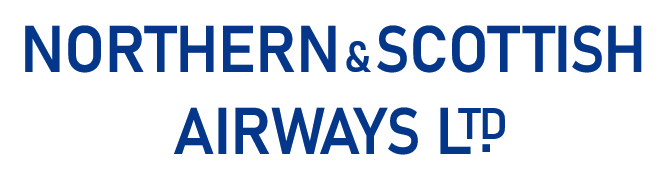
- Founded: 1 July 1934
- Commenced operations: 1 August 1934
- Ceased operations: 12 August 1937
- Operating bases: Glasgow Renfrew Airport
- Destinations: Hebrides islands of Scotland, Isle of Man
- Headquarters: Renfrew Airport
- Key people: George Nicholson

Northern & Scottish Airways was a regional airline established in Glasgow in 1934. It was taken over in 1937, eventually merging to form Scottish Airways.

== History ==
=== Formation ===
The potential of running scheduled air services to the Western Isles of Scotland was successfully demonstrated in 1933 by a bus operator from Ayr, John Sword, with his Midland & Scottish Air Ferries company. After that operation was suddenly stopped in the summer of 1934, another bus company manager, George Nicholson, took on the challenge.

On 1 July 1934 he formed his company, Northern Airways, and on 1 August started testing the market by operating scheduled flights from Newcastle (Cramlington Aerodrome) to the Isle of Man (Hall Caine Airport) via Carlisle (Kingstown Municipal Airport) in his De Havilland DH.84 Dragon G-ACFG. Despite stopping the experiment on 30 September, on 21 November he renamed his airline Northern & Scottish Airways Ltd (N&SA), and on 1 December 1934 with the same aircraft started a service from Glasgow Renfrew Airport to Campbeltown (Kintyre Airport) and Islay (Port Ellen, also known as Duich or Glenegedale), a route that had been pioneered by John Sword's Midland & Scottish Air Ferries.

=== Operations ===
The new route made a slow start, but by the following summer, had grown to two daily flights, and on 17 May 1935 he started a service between Glasgow and the Isle of Man (Hall Caine Airport). On 1 January 1935, Nicholson had agreed a contract with Argyll County Council to provide air ambulance services. Nicholson appointed David Barclay as chief pilot that year. (Note: David Barclay stayed with the organisation, becoming the manager of BEA's Air Ambulance unit. He retired in 1965 having been awarded an MBE in 1944 and having flown 1,271 air ambulance flights as well as scheduled services. Several aircraft serving the region have been named in his honour.)

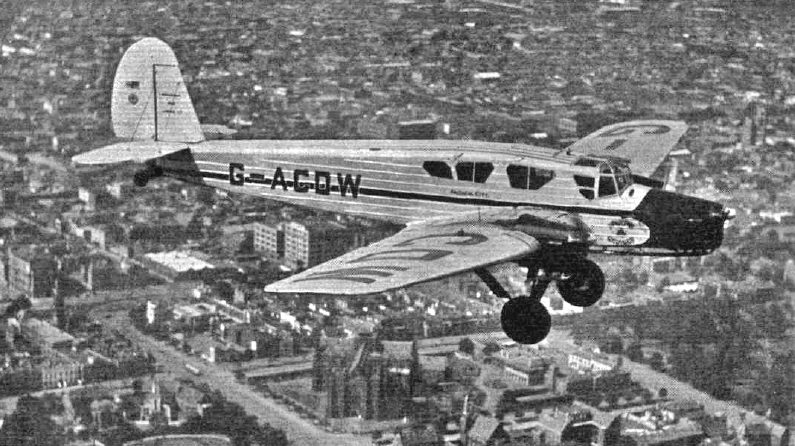
Spartan Cruiser II of Spartan Air Lines

These activities were being watched by Clive Pearson, head of the powerful investment group Whitehall Securities Corporation, who had already started Spartan Air Lines and was looking to link it to the north of England and to Scotland. N&SA fitted the bill, so on 23 May 1935, Pearson took control of N&SA, leaving Nicholson as its head. In June, Pearson took a majority holding in Highland Airways, which served the Scottish Northern Isles, thus almost completing his coverage of Scottish air routes.

Services continued as before, now also bolstered with Spartan Cruiser airliners brought in from Spartan Air Lines, and the two main routes. Isle of Man to Glasgow, and Glasgow to Campbeltown and Islay were operated as part of the United Airways schedule, United being Pearson's new airline operating in the north of England with a link to Spartan at London’s Heston Aerodrome.

In September 1935 Pearson created British Airways Ltd by combining Spartan Air Lines, United Airways, and the previously independent Hillman's Airways. (Note: The link with Hillman’s started in the summer of 1935 with a game of tennis between Pearson and Major McCrindle, who had taken control of Hillman’s after the death of its founder, Ted Hillman.) N&SA was kept out of the new company, but the two co-operated, and aircraft were transferred between them, N&SA taking several of their De Havilland DH.89 Dragon Rapides to provide extra capacity.

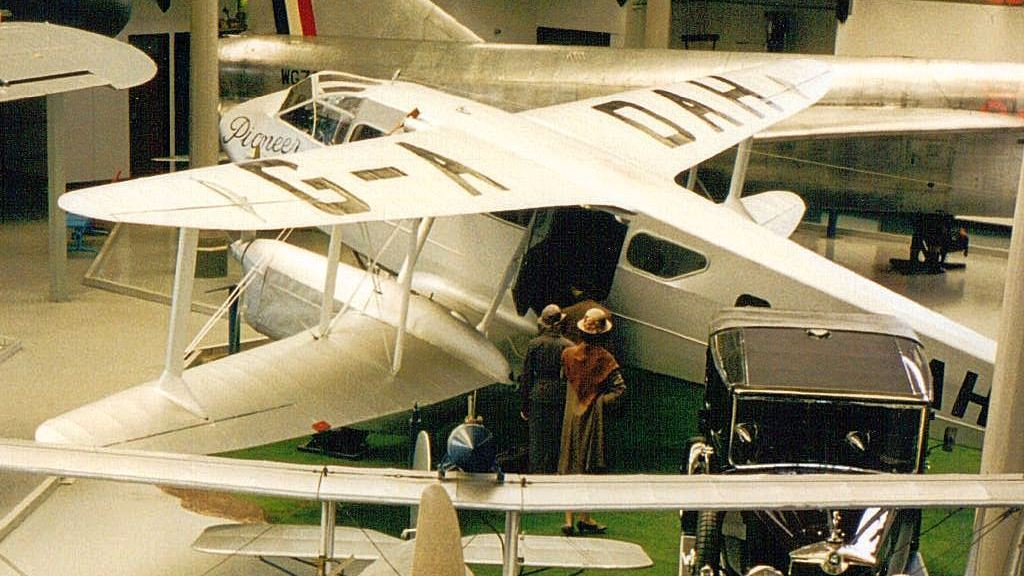
Dragon Rapide at the Manchester Science and Industry Museum

On 5 December 1935 David Barclay flew Dragon G-ACFG on another new route, to Glen Brittle, (Note: Glenbrittle is the hamlet where the airfield was situated, in the valley of Glen Brittle.) on the Isle of Skye, extending the following month to Askernish on South Uist, and again in February 1936 to Sollas on North Uist. The service ran every day except Sundays, operating from Renfrew in a circular fashion, with Monday, Wednesday and Friday flights calling at Skye, North then South Uist, and Tuesday, Thursday and Saturday flights calling at South then North Uist, and Skye.

During 1936 further additions were made to these routes with on-demand services from North and South Uist to Barra and Benbecula, and from North Uist to Harris on the Isle of Lewis and Harris. (Note: Ted Fresson of Highland Airways had tried to establish an airfield at Stornoway, to the north of Harris and the Outer Hebrides’ largest town, but had met resistance from the council. Work to complete the airfield, at Melbost just outside the town, eventually started in 1938 and was completed in 1939 just as all civil aviation was banned due to the outbreak of World War Two. In May 1940, N&SA, which had become the Southern Division of Scottish Airways, was permitted by National Air Communications to use the airfield, which they did as an extension of the Harris service.)

On 1 July 1936, Pearson took full control of N&SA, but still kept it separate from British Airways. The company kept its identity and George Nicholson was retained as the managing director. N&SA took over all of British Airways’ internal routes from Liverpool northwards, and expanded its air ambulance work with a new contract with Inverness County Council. In early 1937, N&SA established a radio station at North Uist, making navigation, weather reporting and general communication much easier.

=== Demise ===
On 12 August 1937 Pearson formed one large airline called Scottish Airways. He brought in investment from LMS Railway, and from David MacBrayne, the Scottish ferry company which established Western Isles Airways as its investment tool. They brought N&SA and Highland Airways into the new airline. To avoid confusion with Scottish Airways the company was renamed Northern Airways Limited on 6 September 1937 and it became a non-functional holding company. On 2 August 1938 Northern Airways completely lost its identity, becoming the Southern Division of Scottish Airways, still based in Glasgow and with Nicholson still in charge. The company finally went into voluntary liquidation when British Airways merged with Imperial Airways in November 1939.

On 1 February 1947, in the process of nationalising all British scheduled airlines, the new British European Airways (BEA) took over Scottish Airways, and on 30 September 1948 Nicholson was made redundant. He died in South Africa in 1950.

== Routes ==
From timetable dated 1 July 1936

- Renfrew — Skye — North Uist (on-demand to Harris) — Benbecula — South Uist (on demand to Barra) — Renfrew
- Renfrew — Campbeltown — Islay (on demand to Tiree)
- Renfrew — Isle of Man
- Renfrew — Belfast (Newtownards)
- Isle of Man — Belfast
- Isle of Man — Liverpool (Speke)
- Isle of Man — Blackpool (Stanley Park)
- Isle of Man — Carlisle (Kingstown)

== Fleet list ==
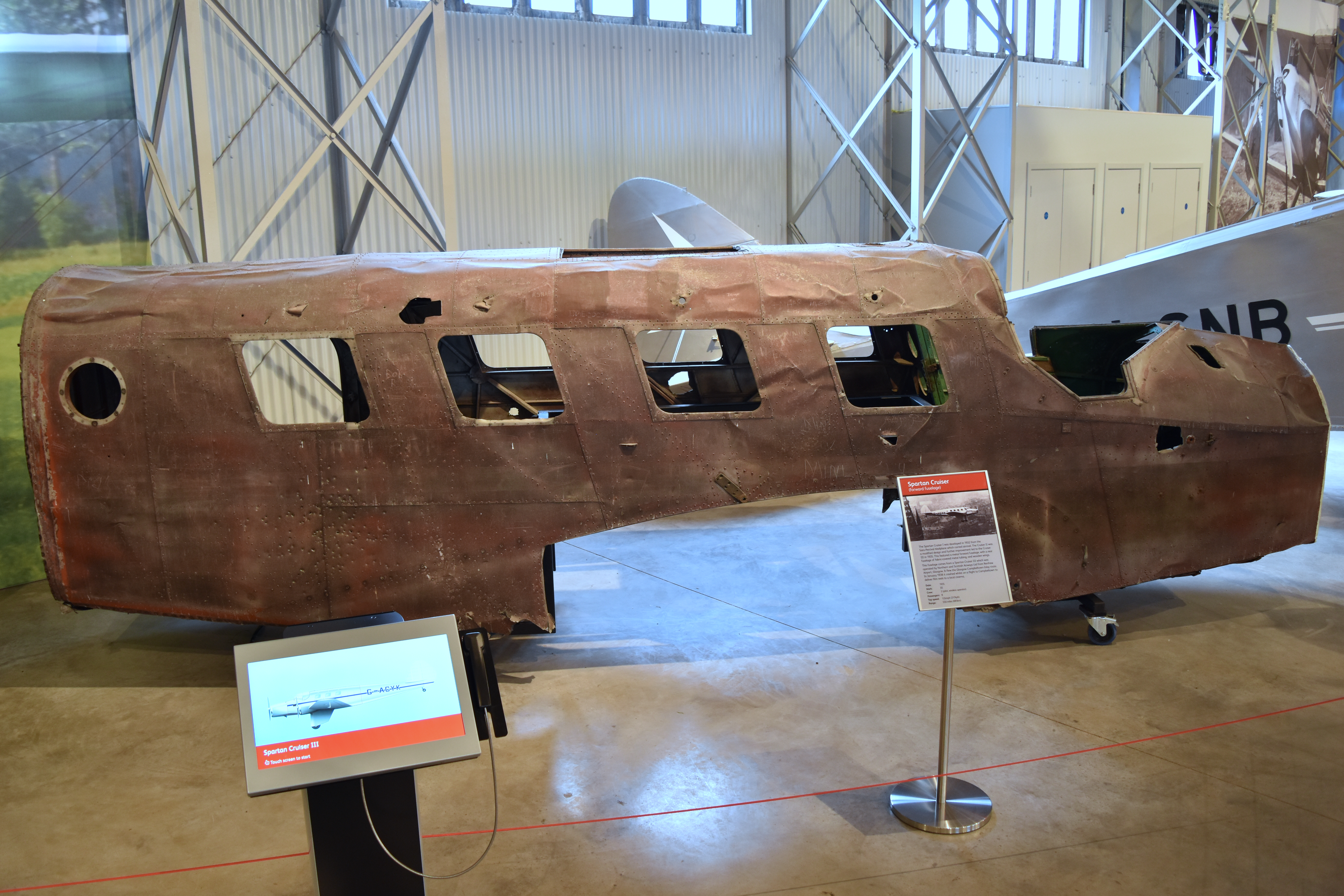
The fuselage of Spartan Cruiser at the National Museum of Flight

Northern & Scottish Airways Ltd fleet
Type	Registration	From	To	Fate	Notes	References
de Havilland Fox Moth	G-ACED	1 June 1935	March 1937	Sold abroad	Ex Scottish Motor Traction. To Australia as VH-UZL, destroyed at Lae, Papua New Guinea by enemy action 21 January 1942	
de Havilland Dragon 1	G-ACFG	1934	February 1937	Sold abroad	George Nicholson's first aircraft, registered to N&SA later the same year. To Australia as VH-UZG, crashed Cairns, Queensland 7 May 1937	
Dragon 1	G-ACJS	8 January 1935	November 1936	Withdrawn	Ex Midland & Scottish Air Ferries	
Dragon II	G-ACMO	4 July 1935	March 1938	Sold abroad	Ex Jersey Airways. To Australia as VH-ABK, A34-4	
Dragon II	G-ACNG	19 January 1937	29 October 1937	Transferred	Ex British Airways Ltd (BAL). Returned to BAL then Scottish Airways. Crashed RNAS Hatston, Kirkwall 14 April 1940	
Dragon II	G-ACNH	4 July 1935	January 1937	Cancelled	Ex Jersey Airways	
Dragon II	G-ACOR	8 March 1937	23 February 1938	Sold abroad	Ex BAL. To Australia VH-AEA damaged Papua New Guinea 11 March 1942	
de Havilland Rapide	G-ADAG	30 July 1936	2 September 1937	Sold	Ex BAL. To Airwork Ltd (Note: Airwork was another company in which Whitehall Securities had an investment.) and impressed 15 July 1940 as Z7264. Reduced to spares 13 September 1943	
Rapide	G-ADAH	10 August 1936	31 August 1937	Sold	Ex BAL and wore a mixed BAL/N&SA livery. To Airwork Ltd. Withdrawn from use 18 February 1959. Displayed at the Science and Industry Museum in Manchester in Allied Airways (Gandar Dower) Ltd markings, current as of 2020	
Rapide	G-ADBU	11 June 1936	2 November 1936	Crashed	Ex BAL. Crashed on take-off from Renfrew. There were no injuries among the one crew and seven passengers	
Rapide	G-ADDF	29 June 1936	31 August 1937	Sold	Ex BAL. To Airwork and sold abroad September 1937	
Spartan Cruiser II	G-ACSM	30 June 1936	12 August 1937	Transferred	Ex BAL. To Scottish Airways. Impressed 2 April 1940 as X9433. Airframe decayed, scrapped 4 July 1940 (Note: After impressment, the RAF discovered that the Cruisers had suffered severely from corrosion from operations at Barra.)	
Cruiser II	G-ACVT	17 May 1936	25 July 1936	Crashed	Ex BAL. Overran on landing at Skye. The pilot and the two passengers were unhurt but the aircraft was wrecked	
Cruiser II	G-ACYL	19 February 1936	12 August 1937	Transferred	Ex BAL. To Scottish Airways. Badly damaged landing at Hall Caine Airport 16 May 1936 and repaired. Impressed 2 April 1940 as X9431. Struck off charge November 1941, decayed	
Cruiser II	G-ACZM	24 October 1936	12 August 1937	Transferred	Ex BAL. To Scottish Airways. Withdrawn from use 9 September 1940 and scrapped in April 1942	
Cruiser III	G-ACYK	1 June 1937	12 August 1937	Transferred	Ex BAL. To Scottish Airways, crashed at Largs 14 January 1938, crew unhurt. Fuselage retrieved by RAF helicopter 25 July 1973, displayed at the National Museum of Flight in Scotland; the only remains of a Cruiser existing in 2020	
Cruiser III	G-ADEL	16 June 1937	12 August 1937	Transferred	Ex BAL. To Scottish Airways, impressed 2 April 1940 as X9432. Struck off charge 26 July 1940, decayed	
Cruiser III	G-ADEM	6 June 1936	20 November 1936	Crashed	Ex BAL. Struck a hangar and caught fire on take-off for the Isle of Man in thick fog at Blackpool. Both occupants, Captain Charles O’Connell, and the passenger, Mrs Eileen Miller, were killed, 5 aircraft in the hangar were destroyed	
Another Rapide, G-ADAE, was initially registered to N&SA but was delivered to United Airways.

The livery was overall silver with blue lettering and trim.

== See also ==
- List of defunct airlines of the United Kingdom

== Bibliography ==
- Davies, R. E. G. (2005). British Airways: An airline and its aircraft Volume 1: 1919 - 1939. McLean, Virginia, USA: Paladwr Press. ISBN 1-888962-24-0.
- Doyle, Neville (2001). The Triple Alliance - The Predecssors of the First British Airways. Tonbridge, Kent, England: Air-Britain. ISBN 0-85130-286-6.
- Calderwood, Roy (1999). Times subject to Tides: The Story of Barra Airport. Erskine, Scotland: Kea Publishing. ISBN 0-9518958-3-4.
