= British Airways Ltd =

Airline of the United Kingdom (1935–1939)

- Type: Public
- Industry: Air transport
- Predecessor: Spartan Air Lines; United Airways; Hillman's Airways
- Founded: 30 September 1935
- Founder: Bernard Clive Pearson
- Defunct: 1 September 1939
- Fate: Merged with Imperial Airways
- Successor: British Overseas Airways Corporation
- Headquarters: United Kingdom
- Number of locations: Stapleford Aerodrome; Heston Aerodrome; Gatwick Airport; Croydon Airport

British Airways Ltd. was a British airline company operating in Europe in the period 1935–1939. It was formed in 1935 by the merger of Spartan Air Lines Ltd, United Airways Ltd (no relation to the US carrier United Airlines), and Hillman's Airways. Its corporate emblem was a winged lion.

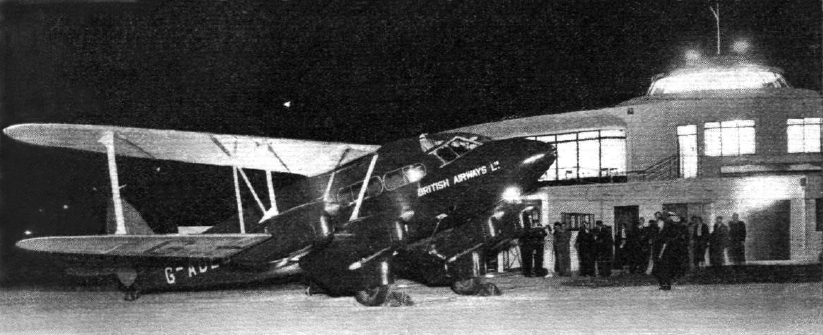
DH.86 of British Airways Ltd at the Beehive (Gatwick Airport), 1936

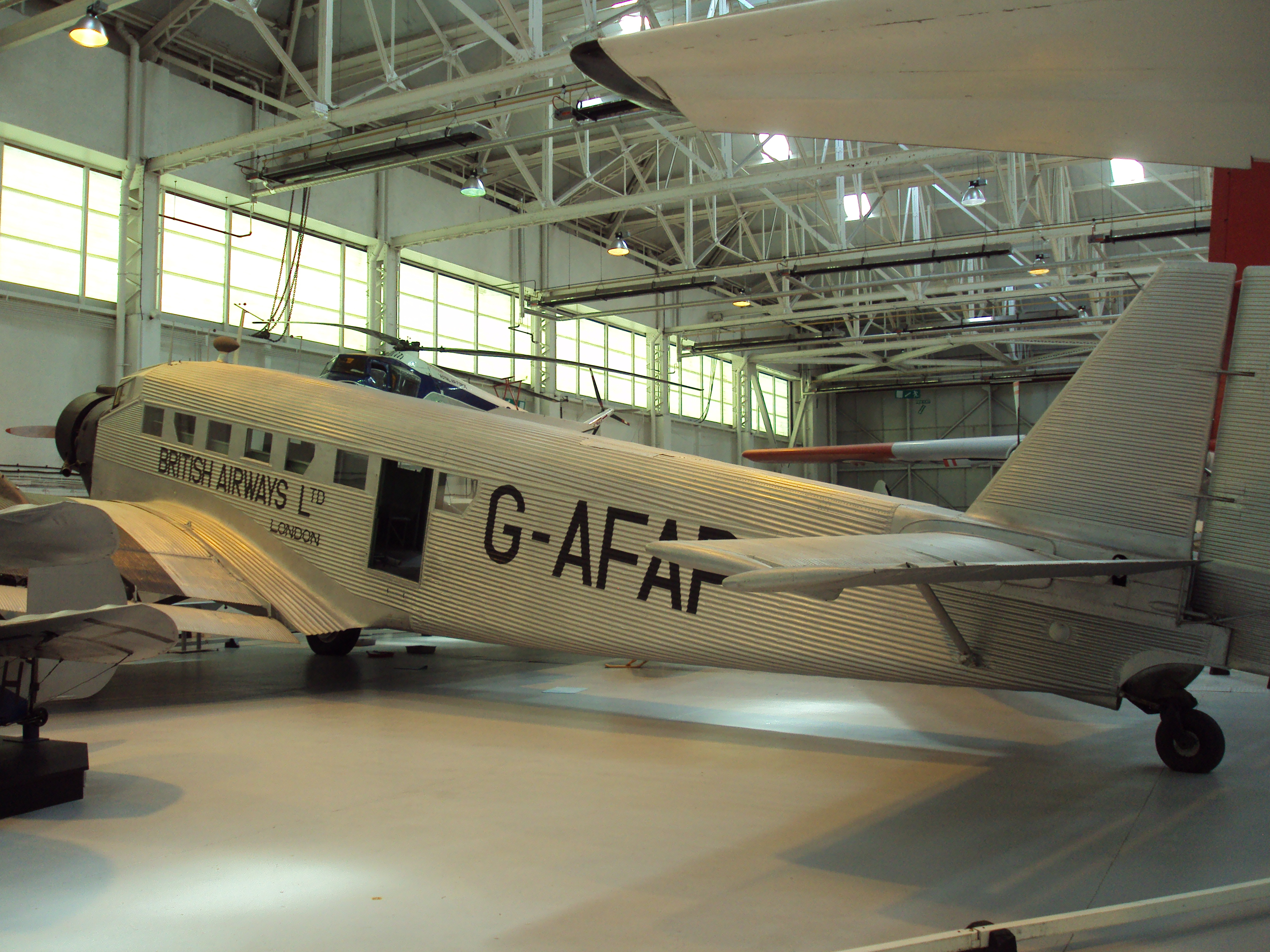
CASA 352 at RAF Museum Cosford, painted as Junkers Ju 52 (G-AFAP) of British Airways Ltd.

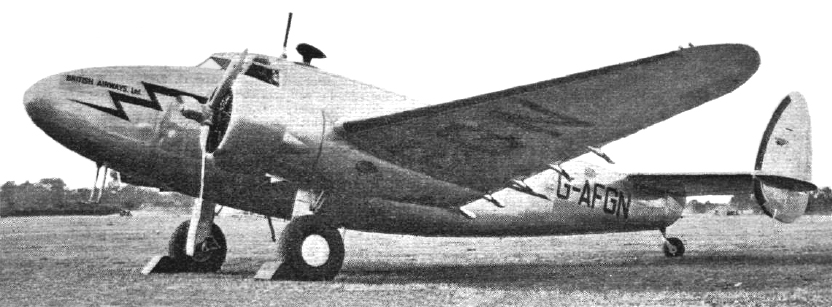
Lockheed 14 (G-AFGN) of British Airways Ltd at Heston, 1938

== History ==
On 30 September 1935, Allied British Airways Ltd was formed for the purpose of merging the publicly quoted company Hillman's Airways with the private companies of Spartan Air Lines and United Airways Ltd, both controlled by Whitehall Securities Corporation Ltd (WSC), owned by the Hon. Bernard Clive Pearson. Its directors were W. D. L. Roberts, Harold Balfour and John DeC Ballardie from WSC, plus John R. McCrindle, Edgar L. Granville and Gerard L. D'Erlanger from Hillman's. On 29 October 1935, the name was changed to British Airways Ltd, and on 11 December 1935 it converted to a public company. Whitehall Securities was joined as investor in the merged airline by banking house Erlangers Ltd, through its Chairman, Leo d'Erlanger. The combined assets of 37 operational aircraft included Armstrong Whitworth Argosy II, Spartan Three Seater, DH.60 Moths, DH.84 Dragons, DH.89 Dragon Rapides, DH.86As and Spartan Cruisers.

In early 1936, aircraft and services of Hillman's Airways were transferred from Stapleford Aerodrome to Heston Aerodrome, the principal base of Spartan Air Lines and United Airways; the single-engined types and most of the DH.84s were then sold. The London to Liverpool services of United Airways were discontinued, and the services between Liverpool, Blackpool, Isle of Man, Belfast and Glasgow were transferred to Northern & Scottish Airways, a sister company. The ownership of DH.89s and Spartan Cruisers was progressively transferred to Northern & Scottish, and the Argosy was withdrawn from use at Stanley Park Aerodrome (Blackpool).

In April 1936 the airline merged with British Continental Airways; the merged fleet continued to operate as British Airways.

On 25 May 1936, the service from London to Cowes and Ryde aerodromes on the Isle of Wight, that was still jointly operated by Spartan Air Lines and Railway Air Services using DH.84s, was transferred from Heston to Gatwick Airport. Gatwick was then undergoing renovation and redevelopment, to include a new terminal and linked railway station, completed in 1937. In 1936, services from London to Paris, Brussels, Ostend, Amsterdam, Hamburg, Copenhagen, Malmö and Stockholm were flown using DH.89s and DH.86s. Four Fokker F.XIIs were purchased from KLM, after attempted purchase and use by Crilly Airways for a London-Lisbon service, and they were employed on the Paris service until sold in September 1936 for intended use in the Spanish Civil War. During 1936, and into 1937, various night mail contracts were operated, using DH.86s and additional two Fokker F.XIIs, two Fokker F.VIIIs, and three Junkers Ju 52s, to Lille, Cologne, and Hanover.

On 7 February 1937, all services were transferred to Croydon Airport, after surfaces at Gatwick became water-logged due to heavy traffic on immature turf and drains that collapsed; some training operations remained there. In March 1937, the first four of seven Lockheed 10 Electras were delivered. On 12 August 1937, Scottish Airways Ltd was formed to merge the operations of Northern & Scottish Airlines with Highland Airways Ltd, and British Airways Ltd held a 50% stake. On 29 May 1938, most aircraft and services were transferred from Croydon to Heston, due to congestion and unpredictable fog, but night mail operations continued from Croydon. On 3 September 1938, the first of nine Lockheed 14s was delivered.

On 15 September 1938, British Prime Minister Neville Chamberlain flew from Heston to Munich for a meeting with German leader Adolf Hitler at Berchtesgaden. A Lockheed 10 Electra (G-AEPR) of British Airways Ltd was used on that first of three occasions, piloted by C. Nigel Pelly. On 22 September 1938, Chamberlain flew to Cologne for a meeting at Bad Godesberg in Lockheed 14 G-AFGN, flown by Eric Robinson. On 29 September 1938, G-AFGN was piloted by Victor Flowerday on the final trip to Munich, that resulted in the Munich Agreement, Chamberlain's widely publicised return at Heston on 30 September 1938, and his subsequent "Peace for our time" speech.

During 1939, new services were operated to Berlin, Frankfurt, Budapest, Warsaw and Lisbon.

== Second World War ==
Before the outbreak of war on 1 September 1939, the British government had already implemented the Air Navigation (Restriction in Time of War) Order 1939. That ordered military takeover of most civilian airfields in the UK, cessation of all private flying without individual flight permits, and other emergency measures. It was administered by a statutory department of the Air Ministry titled National Air Communications (NAC). By 1 September 1939, the aircraft and administrations of British Airways Ltd (BAL) and Imperial Airways were physically transferred to Bristol (Whitchurch) Airport, to be operated jointly by NAC. On 1 April 1940, British Airways Ltd and Imperial Airways Ltd were officially combined into a new company, British Overseas Airways Corporation (BOAC), that had already been formed on 24 November 1939 with retrospective financial arrangements.

== Fleet ==
British Airways Ltd operated the following aircraft:

British Airways Ltd fleet
Aircraft	Total	Introduced	Retired	Notes
Airspeed AS.40 Oxford I	1	1938	1939	
Armstrong Whitworth Argosy	1	1935	1936	
de Havilland DH.60 Moth	2	1935	1936	
de Havilland DH.83 Fox Moth	2	1935	Unknown	
de Havilland DH.84 Dragon	2	1935	Unknown	
de Havilland DH.86 Express	11	1935	1938	
de Havilland DH.89 Dragon Rapide	13	1935	Unknown	
Fokker F.VIII	2	1936	1939	
Fokker F.XII	6	1936	1939	
Junkers Ju 52	3	1937	1939	
Lockheed Model 10 Electra	7	1936	1939	
Lockheed Model 12 Electra Junior	3	1938	1939	
Lockheed Model 14 Super Electra	9	1938	1939	
Spartan Three Seater	1	1935	Unknown	
Spartan Cruiser	8	1935	1936	

== Accidents and incidents ==
- On 16 May 1936, a Spartan Cruiser (G-ACYL) crashed on landing at Hall Caine Airport, Ramsey, Isle of Man. The aircraft was operating a scheduled passenger flight from Glasgow (Renfrew) Airport. Despite the loss of a wing in the accident, the aircraft was repaired and returned to service.

== See also ==
- Aviation in the United Kingdom
- History of British Airways
- List of defunct airlines of the United Kingdom

== Notes ==
- Doyle, Neville. 2001. The Triple Alliance: The Predecessors of the first British Airways. Air-Britain. ISBN 0-85130-286-6
- Moss, Peter W. 1962. Impressments Log (Vol I-IV). Air-Britain.
- Moss, Peter W. October 1974. British Airways. Aeroplane Monthly.
- Poole, Stephen (1999). Rough Landing or Fatal Flight. Douglas: Amulree Publications. ISBN 1-901508-03-X.
- Sherwood, Tim. 1999. Coming in to Land: A Short History of Hounslow, Hanworth and Heston Aerodromes 1911–1946. Heritage Publications (Hounslow Library) ISBN 1-899144-30-7
