= George Galanopoulos =

George Galanopoulos may refer to:

- George Galanopoulos (businessman)
- George Galanopoulos (basketball)
