= London Executive Aviation =

British charter airline

IATA	ICAO	Call sign
—	LNX	LONEX
- Founded: 1995
- Hubs: London Luton
- Fleet size: 21
- Destinations: Worldwide
- Headquarters: Stapleford Aerodrome, Romford, United Kingdom
- Website: www.luxaviationuk.com

London Executive Aviation is an air charter airline based at Stapleford Aerodrome near Romford, United Kingdom. It was co-founded in 1996 by George Galanopoulos and Patrick Margetson-Rushmore.

It operates ad-hoc private jet charters and offers aircraft management services worldwide. Its current Chief Executive is Patrick Margretson-Rushmore.

London Executive Aviation Ltd holds a CAA Type B Operating Licence permitting carriage of passengers, cargo and mail on aircraft with fewer than 20 seats and/or weighing less than 10 tonnes.

== Fleet ==
The London Executive Aviation fleet includes:

- 7 Embraer Legacy 600 (as of August 2016)
- 2 Embraer Legacy 650 (as of August 2016)
- 1 Dassault Falcon 2000
- 2 Bombardier Challenger 300
- 6 Cessna Citation Excel
- 1 Embraer Phenom 300
- 2 Cessna Citation II

London Executive Aviation introduced the four-passenger Cessna Citation Mustang into the UK charter market and placed Cessna's largest European order for the aircraft. Their fleet comprises a variety of different business jets for different tasks.

One of the Bombardier Challenger 300 owned by LEA is based at London Luton Airport.
