= George Galanopoulos (businessman) =

British commercial pilot and businessperson

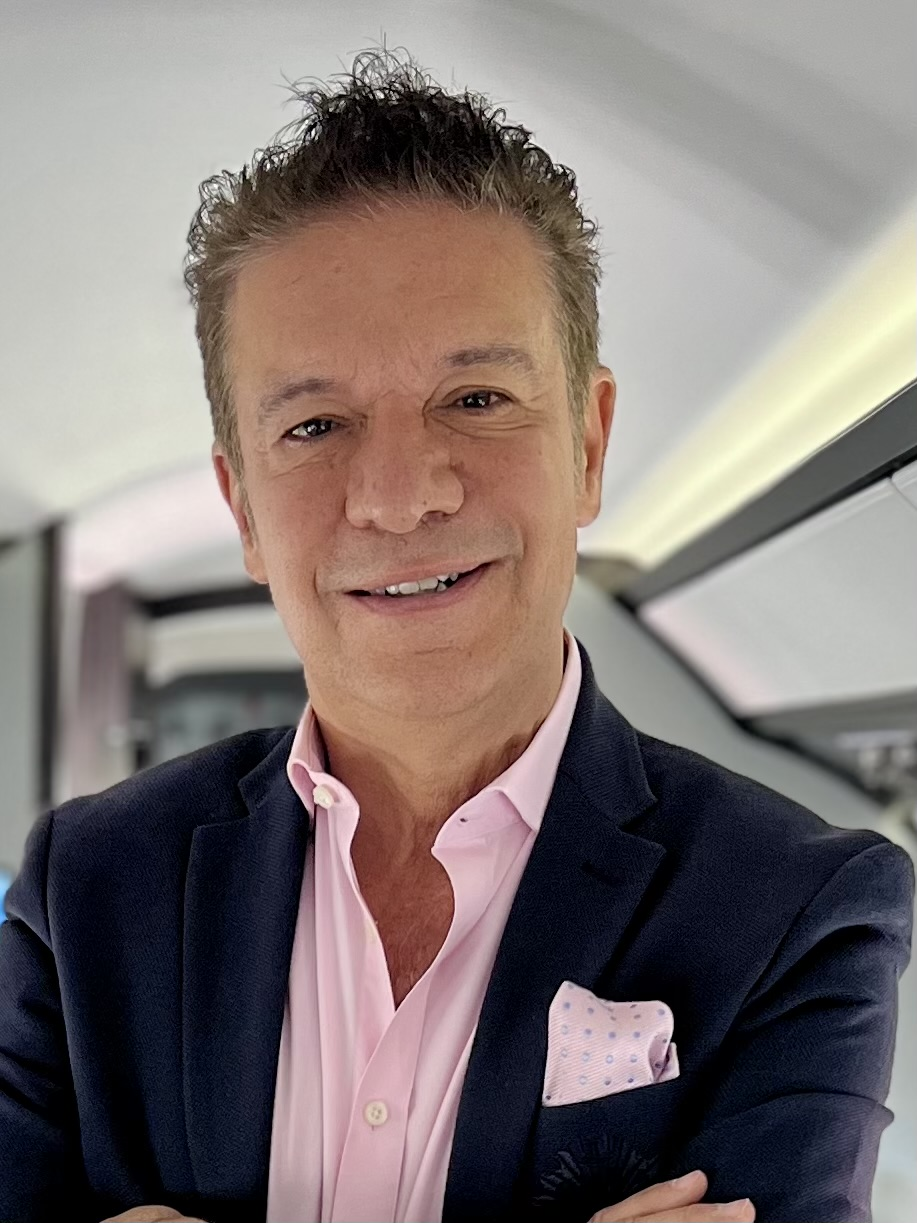
George Galanopoulos in 2024

George Galanopoulos is a Greek-British commercial pilot and businessperson. He is best known as the co-founder of London Executive Aviation where he served as the managing director and then the CEO after being rebranded to Luxaviation UK. He is a Board Member of The British Business and General Aviation Association (BBGA).

== Early life ==
Galanopoulous moved to Britain at age 20, to study computer science.

== Career ==
Galanopoulos began his career in 1985 as a commercial pilot. In 1996, Galanopoulos and Patrick Margetson-Rushmore co-founded London Executive Aviation, an air charter airline Headquartered at Stapleford Aerodrome near Romford, United Kingdom. London Executive Aviation then operated a diverse fleet including, Beechcraft King Air 200 turboprop and the ultra-long-range Bombardier Global 6000.

In May 2014, Luxembourg-based, Luxaviation Group acquired a 70% stake in London Executive Aviation which rebranded to Luxaviation UK as a part of the deal, while the founders retained a 30% share in the company. Galanopoulos continued in his position as the managing director of Luxaviation UK. In May 2020, Rushmore retired from his CEO position due to health issues and Galanopoulos became the CEO of Luxaviation UK. After joining Luxaviation Group, Galanopoulos was appointed as the European head of charter for the group.
