= Armstrong Whitworth Argosy =

British biplane airliner, 1926–1936

Argosy
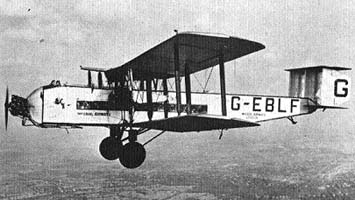
- An Argosy Mk I of Imperial Airways in 1926. This particular aircraft (G-EBLF) bore the name City of Glasgow.

General information
- Type: Airliner
- Manufacturer: Armstrong Whitworth
- Status: Out of production, out of service
- Primary users: Imperial Airways British Airways Ltd; United Airways Ltd
- Number built: 7

History
- Introduction date: 1926
- First flight: 16 March 1926
- Retired: December 1936

The Armstrong Whitworth Argosy was a three-engine biplane airliner designed and produced by the British aircraft manufacturer Armstrong Whitworth Aircraft. It was the company's first airliner.

The Argosy was developed during the early-to-mid 1920s in response to a statement by Imperial Airways that new multi-engined airliners were being sought to replace its single-engined counterparts then in use. Armstrong Whitworth proposed a relatively large biplane airliner, powered by three Armstrong Siddeley Jaguar engines; its construction largely composed of plywood and fabric supported by steel tubing. Imperial Airways opted to initially order a pair of aircraft to serve its European routes, while the Air Ministry ordered a single example as well. On 16 March 1926, the first Argosy, G-EBLF, performed its maiden flight.

Following the delivery of the second aircraft to Imperial Airways, the Argosy performed its first passenger flight on 16 July 1926, flying from London to Paris. Using the type, Imperial Airways inaugurated the world's first named air service, the luxury 'Silver Wing' service, between these two cities. The type would be operated by the airline for nine years, during which time a total of three Argosies would be lost in accidents, although only one of these resulted in fatalities. During 1935, Imperial Airways opted to retire all remaining aircraft in favour of the next generation of airliners, which were larger and equipped with four engines instead. All operators had withdrawn the type by the end of 1936.

== Design and development ==
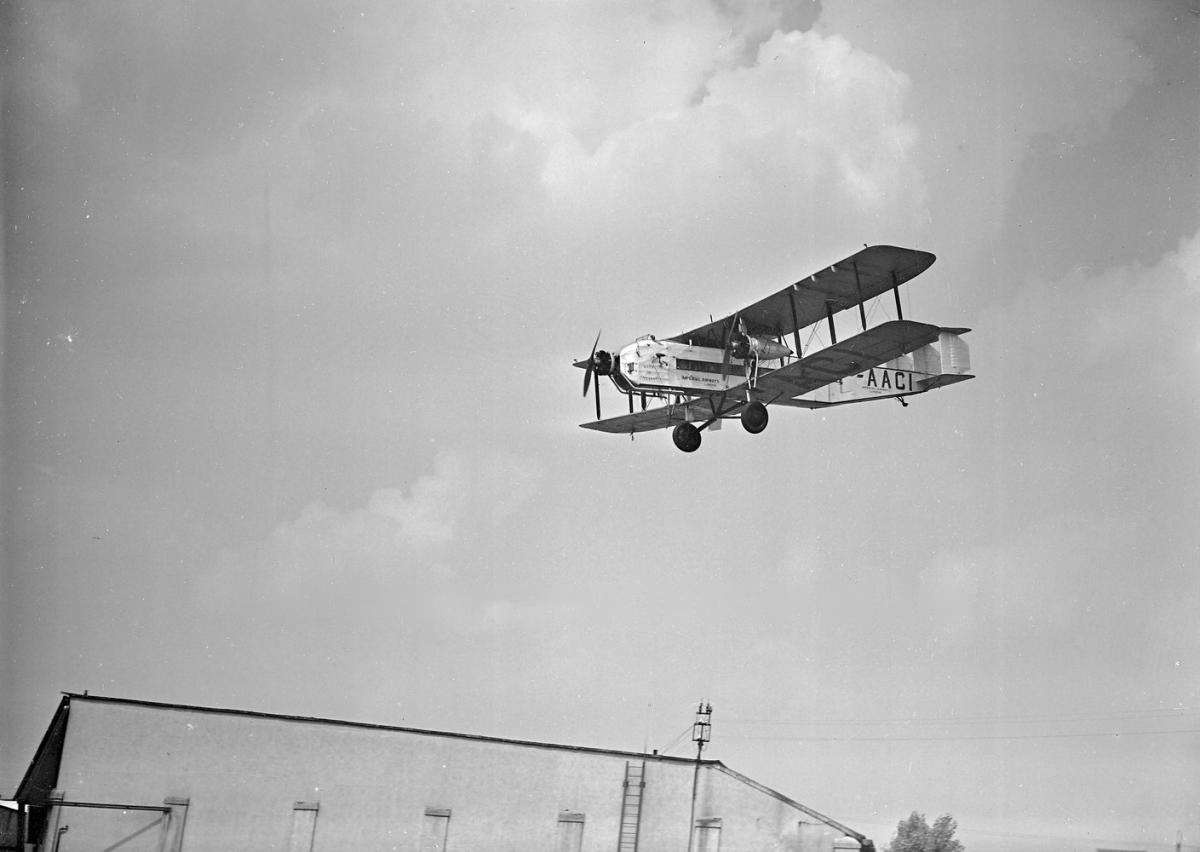
Imperial Airways Argosy in flight, 1933

=== Background ===
The origins of the A.W.154 Argosy can be heavily attributed to the release of a specification by the British airline Imperial Airways in 1922. This specification sought a new airliner to serve on its Middle East routes. Amongst the requirements listed was a range of 500 miles (800 km), even when flown into a headwind of 30 miles per hour (50 km/h), as well as stipulating the use of multiple air-cooled engines; the airline would subsequently declare a policy for all its airliners to be multi-engine on the grounds of safety. In order to achieve this, Imperial Airways would need to procure replacement aircraft for much of its fleet, which largely consisted of aging single-engine de Havilland-built aircraft which Imperial Airways had inherited from its constituent companies, such as Daimler Airway.

Although the company had no prior experience of designing airliners, Armstrong Whitworth decided that it would respond with its own proposal. It was a relatively large biplane, possessing an angular box-shaped fuselage that was paired with a biplane tail featuring three fins and rudders. The aircraft was powered by three Armstrong Siddeley Jaguar engines, each capable of producing up to 385 hp (287 kW); one engine was sited at the tip of the aircraft's nose while the other two were mounted between the two wings. All fuel was accommodated within two tanks at the center of the upper wing. The structure was composed of steel tubing, with most exterior surfaces being covered by fabric, including the walls and ceiling of the passenger compartment. This cabin featured a wooden floor, which also acted as bracing, and amenities such as openable windows and a toilet. Baggage was housed in a main hold at the rear, a secondary baggage compartment was located in the nose just forward of the cockpit.

=== Into production ===
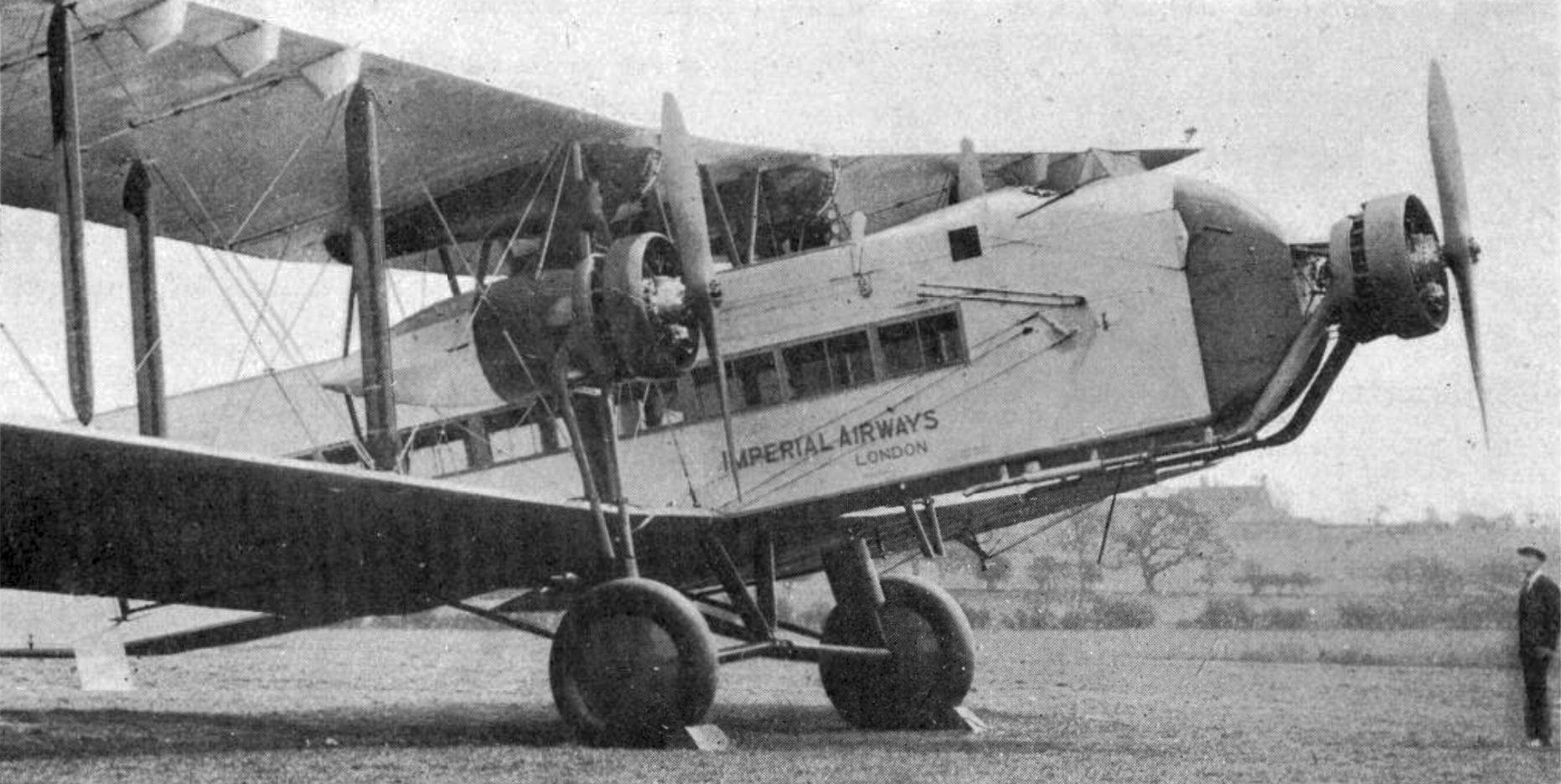
An Argosy in 1929, note the townend rings on the engine (engine cowling).

Upon reviewing the submission, Imperial Airways decided that the proposed airliner would be suitable for its European routes, and promptly issued an initial order for two aircraft; an additional single aircraft was also ordered by the Air Ministry. On 16 March 1926, the first Argosy, G-EBLF, performed its maiden flight, piloted by F. L. Barnard of Imperial Airways. On 18 June 1926, the second aircraft, G-ELBO, made its first flight; one month later, it became the first Argosy to be delivered to Imperial Airways. The third aircraft, which had been ordered by the Air Ministry, was delivered during March 1927.

During 1928, having operated their initial fleet with satisfactory results, Imperial Airways placed an order for a further three Argosies, which was later increased to four. These later aircraft were designated as Argosy Mk. II and were fitted with more powerful 410 hp (310 kW) Jaguar IVA engines, an increased fuel capacity and the addition of automatic wingtip slots. The first Argosy Mk. II version was introduced to service during 1929.

== Operational history ==
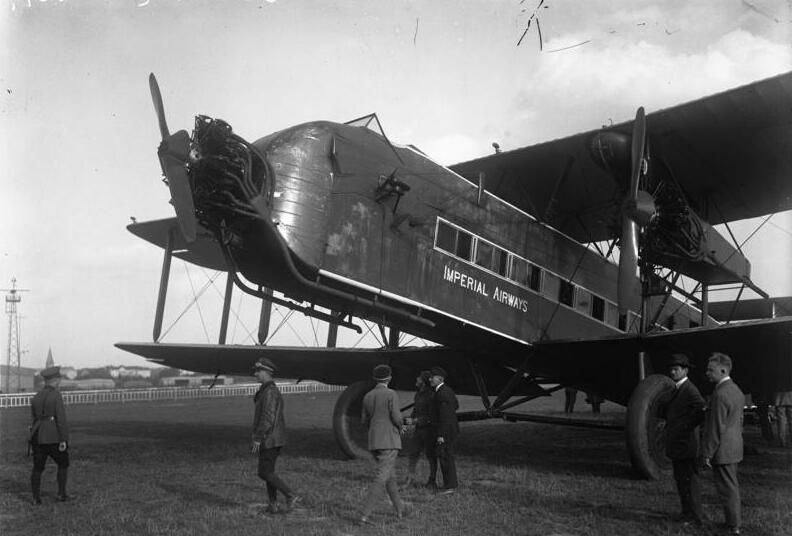
Armstrong Whitworth AW.154 Argosy at Berlin, 1928

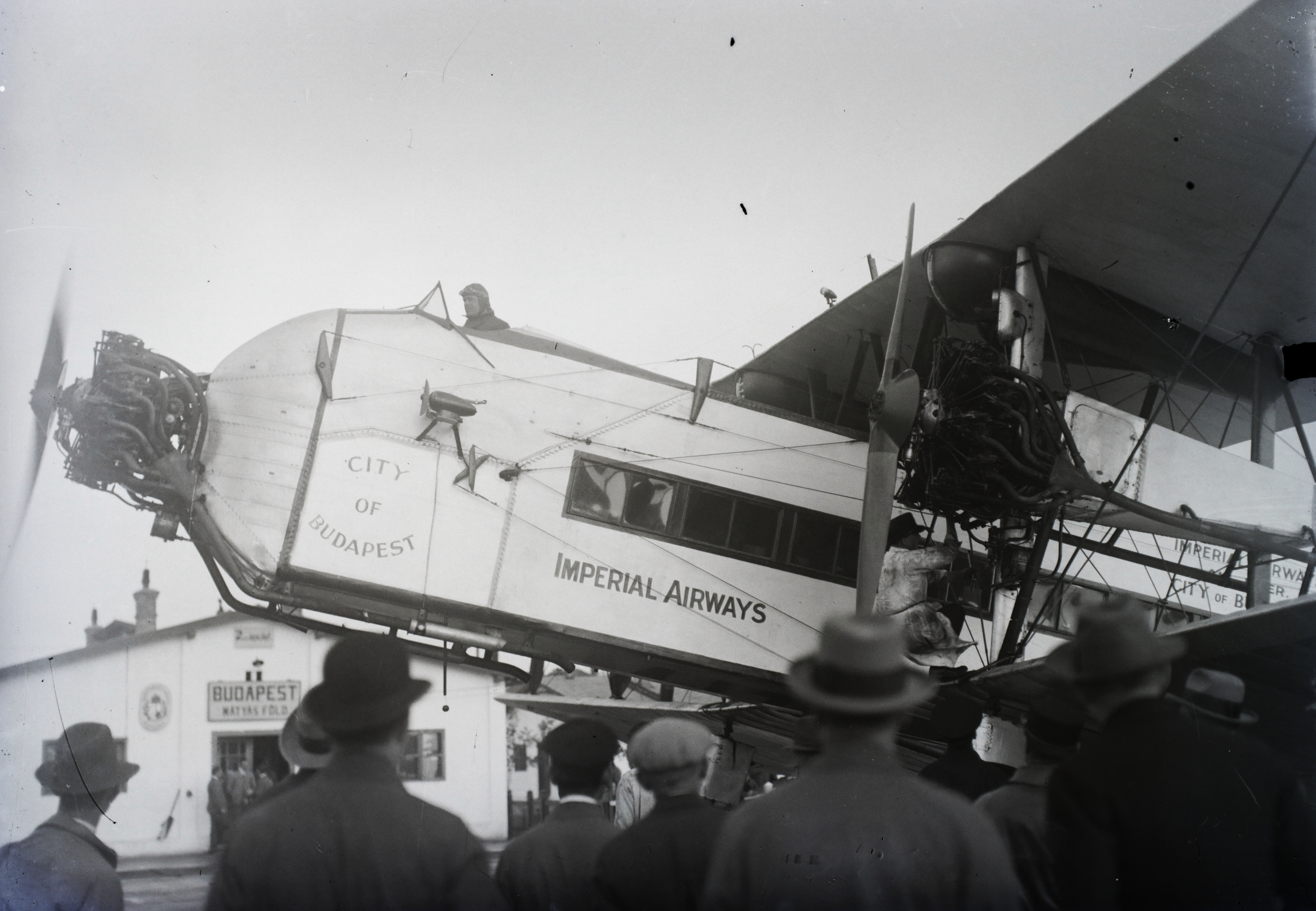
An Argosy in 1928

The Argosy was initially used on European routes with each aircraft named after a city. Later services to South Africa were added. The first passenger flight was from London to Paris on 16 July 1926. Imperial Airways were keen to demonstrate the capabilities and potential uses for their new airliner with its interior being considerably more spacious than any of its rivals. The introduction of the Argosy led to a rapid expansion in passenger numbers being carried by the airline that started within weeks.

Imperial Airways used the Argosy to launch the world's first named air service, the luxury 'Silver Wing' service, which was operated between London and Paris. Aircraft assigned to this service would have two of their seats removed, the space being used to accommodate an onboard bar and a steward was in attendance. During April 1931, Edward, Prince of Wales and his brother Prince George flew home from Paris–Le Bourget Airport in City of Glasgow (G-EBLF), which landed specially in Windsor Great Park.

Starting in 1929, the timing having been largely due to protracted international negotiations, the Argosy was one of the aircraft used on the first air mail route of the British Empire, spanning from London to Karachi, India. Following the arrival of the Argosy Mk IIs during 1929, Imperial Airways opted to have the three Mk Is reengined with the same powerplants to boost their performance. On 28 February 1931, two of these reengined Argosies were used to launch the air mail route through to Cape Town, South Africa; this route proved to be particularly troublesome for the type with low reliability levels being achieved, and left the European routes somewhat underequipped in the process.

Three Argosies were lost during service with Imperial Airways, one being written off in a forced landing near Aswan, and one during a training accident, both in 1931, with no injuries in either accident. On 28 March 1933, the City of Liverpool caught fire over Belgium, causing a crash in which all three crew and twelve passengers were killed.

Argosies continued in service with Imperial Airways until 1935, with the last example, City of Manchester (G-AACJ), being used for joy-riding by United Airways Ltd of Stanley Park Aerodrome (Blackpool), which later was merged into British Airways Ltd. It continued in use with British Airways until December 1936.

== Variants ==
- Argosy Mk I : Powered by three 385 hp (287 kW) Armstrong Siddeley Jaguar IIIA radial piston engines. Later fitted with Jaguar IVA engines. Three constructed.
- Argosy Mk II : Powered by three 420 hp (313 kW) Armstrong Siddeley Jaguar IVA radial piston engines. Four constructed.

== Operators ==
United Kingdom

- British Airways Ltd
- Imperial Airways
- United Airways Ltd

== Imperial Airways Argosy fleet 1926–1935 ==
Type	Registration	Name
Mk. I	G-EBLF	City of Glasgow
Mk. I	G-EBLO	City of Birmingham
Mk. I	G-EBOZ	City of Wellington (later renamed City of Arundel)
Mk. II	G-AACH	City of Edinburgh
Mk. II	G-AACI	City of Liverpool
Mk. II	G-AACJ	City of Manchester
Mk. II	G-AAEJ	City of Coventry

== Specifications (Argosy II) ==
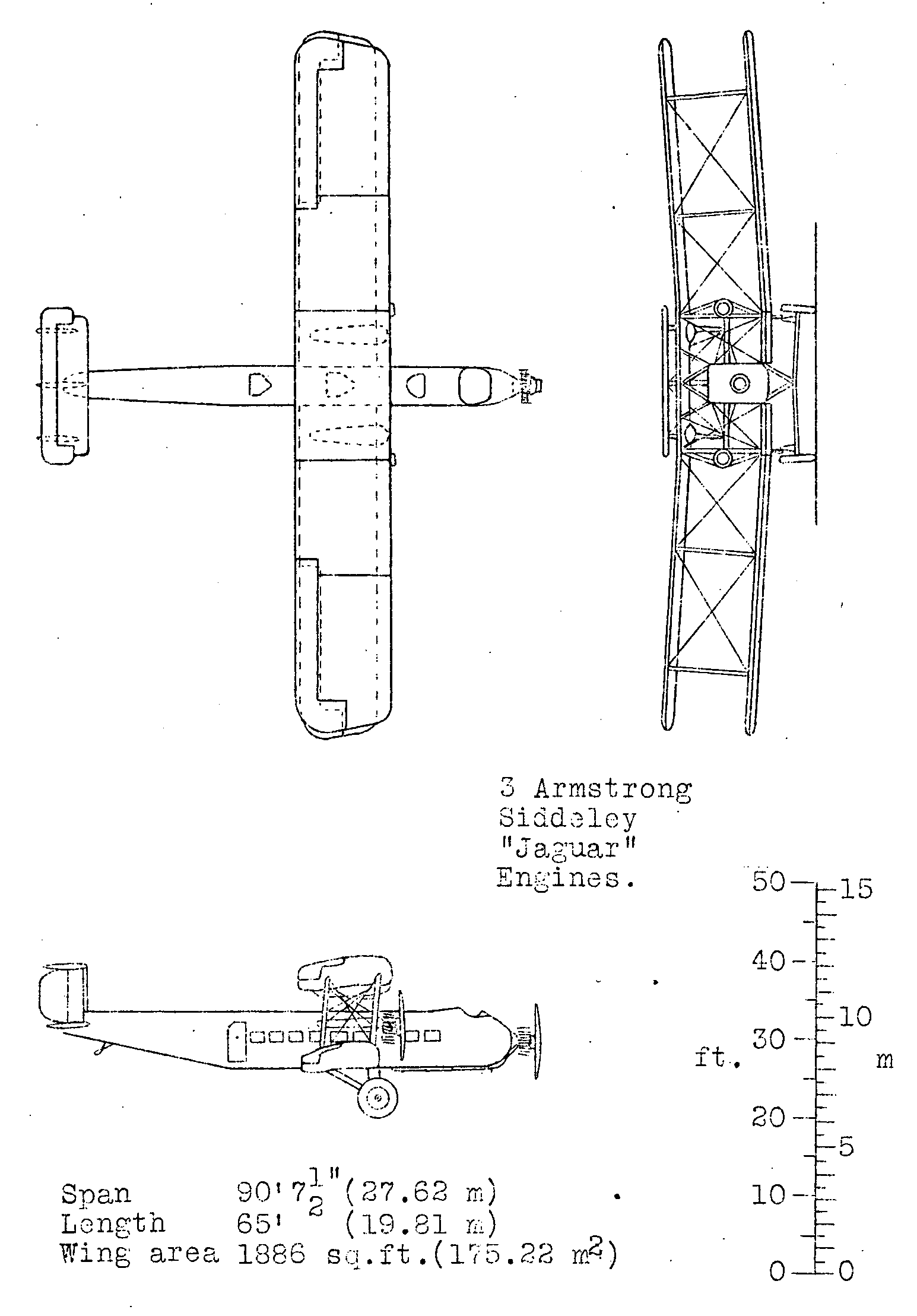
Armstrong Whitworth Argosy 3 view drawing from NACA Aircraft Circular No.14

Data from British Civil Aircraft since 1919, Armstrong Whitworth Aircraft since 1913

General characteristics

- Crew: 2
- Capacity: 20 passengers
- Length: 64 ft 6 in (19.66 m)
- Wingspan: 90 ft 0 in (27.43 m)
- Height: 19 ft 0 in (5.79 m)
- Wing area: 1,890 sq ft (176 m^{2})
- Empty weight: 12,090 lb (5,484 kg)
- Max takeoff weight: 19,200 lb (8,709 kg)
- Powerplant: 3 × Armstrong Siddeley Jaguar IVA 14-cylinder radial engines, 420 hp (310 kW) each

Performance

- Maximum speed: 110 mph (180 km/h, 96 kn)
- Cruise speed: 90 mph (140 km/h, 78 kn)
- Range: 405 mi (652 km, 352 nmi)
- Time to altitude: 4.5 min to 3,000 ft (910 m)

== See also ==
Related development

- Handley Page H.P.42

Aircraft of comparable role, configuration, and era

- Armstrong Whitworth Atalanta
- Armstrong Whitworth Ensign
- de Havilland DH.34
- de Havilland Hercules
- de Havilland Albatross
- Vickers Vulcan

Related lists

- Civil air transport
