= Spartan Cruiser =

Type of aircraft

Cruiser
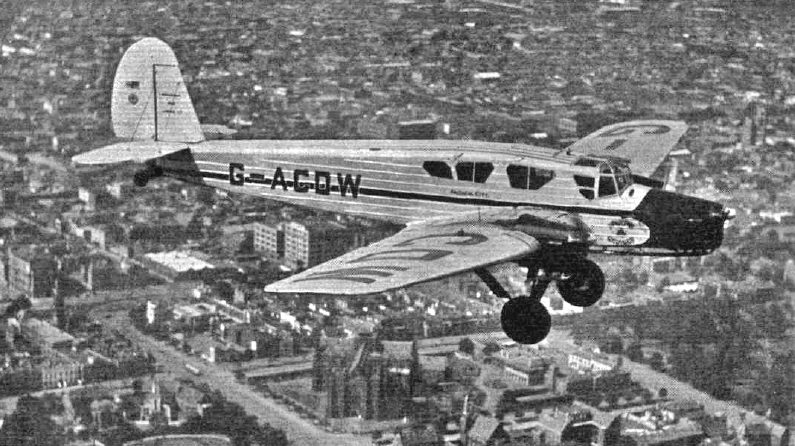
- Spartan Cruiser over Melbourne, 1934

General information
- Type: Light Transport
- Manufacturer: Spartan Aircraft Limited
- Designer: Edgar Percival
- Primary users: Spartan Air Lines British Airways Ltd
- Number built: 17

History
- Introduction date: 1933
- First flight: 1932
- Retired: 1942
- Developed from: Spartan A.24 Mailplane

The Spartan Cruiser was a 1930s British three-engined transport monoplane for 6 to 10 passengers built by Spartan Aircraft Limited at East Cowes, Isle of Wight. It was a development of the Saro-Percival Mailplane for passenger use.

== Development ==
The Saro-Percival Mailplane was a three-engined monoplane mail plane designed by Edgar Percival, and built by Saunders-Roe Limited (Saro) at Cowes in 1931, the aircraft first flying early in 1932. It was a low-winged monoplane with a wooden wing and plywood fuselage powered by three 120 hp (89 kW) de Havilland Gipsy III engines. When Saro was financially re-organised, Percival sold his interest in the aircraft to Saro, who re-designated it as the Saro A.24 Mailplane. Due to the close ties between Saro and Spartan Aircraft, the development of the aircraft was transferred to Spartan, and the aircraft was re-designated again as the Spartan Mailplane. The aircraft was modified to accommodate two passenger seats. Starting on 15 June 1932, the Mailplane (G-ABLI) flew from Stanley Park Aerodrome (Blackpool) to Karachi, India taking a total of five days, 23 hours and 50 minutes.

The Mailplane reportedly generated no commercial interest, so the design was re-worked as a passenger carrier. This was designated the Spartan Cruiser, and the prototype (G-ABTY) first flew in May 1932, piloted by Louis Strange. The original three-engined low-wing layout had been retained, however, the plywood fuselage was substituted for by an all-metal fuselage that could accommodate six passengers and two crew.

Just one example was built of the basic Cruiser (G-ABTY, later known as the Cruiser I). Both the new Cruiser and the Mailplane were displayed at the first Society of British Aircraft Constructors (SBAC) Show at Hendon Aerodrome on 27 June 1932. It was then used for demonstrations, including a 3,593 miles (5,782 km) European sales tour. The Yugoslavia airline Aeroput ordered two aircraft and a licence to build further examples in Yugoslavia at the Zmaj aircraft factory.

The Cruiser was re-designed as the Spartan Cruiser II, featuring a modified fuselage and cockpit. The first Cruiser II (G-ACBM) flew in February 1933, powered by Cirrus Hermes IV engines, and G-ACKG/VT-AER also used that engine type. Most Spartan-built Cruiser IIs were powered by three Gipsy Major engines, but G-ACOU/OK-ATM was powered by Walter Major engines. Between 1933 and 1934, twelve Cruiser IIs were built by Spartan, five of which were exported. Just one licence-built Cruiser II (YU-SAP) was built in Zemun, Yugoslavia, by Zmaj Aircraft, in 1935.

One further development was the Spartan Cruiser III, with an aerodynamically refined fuselage accommodating eight passengers, a modified windscreen and a trousered main undercarriage. Only three Cruiser IIIs were built (G-ACYK, G-ADEL and G-ADEM), for Spartan Air Lines.

== Design ==
The Spartan Cruiser was a three-engined transport monoplane. It had a relatively clean exterior which noticeably contributed to the aircraft's performance. Specifically, the aircraft possessed a greater than average aerodynamic efficiency and a particularly low minimum drag coefficient. Furthermore, the Cruiser had a gross weight to tare weight ratio, when configured as a passenger aircraft, of 1.53, while its freighter guise reportedly achieved 1.65; both values were favourable for the era and indicative considerable engineering skill in respect to the aircraft's structural design. When configured as a freighter, which involved the removal of the cabin furnishings, the aircraft could carry a payload of 1,000 lb, or 2.78 lb per horsepower. In such a configuration, the aircraft could achieve an endurance of six hours and a cruising range of approximately 700 miles, although the payload could be increased beyond this if the distance of the journey was shortened. The aircraft was, even when fully loaded, capable of gaining altitude with any one of its three engines stopped.

The fuselage, which was composed entirely of metal, closely conformed with the design principles present in the hulls of Saro's series of flying boats, although this did not extent to its shape. It was internally divided into transverse sections through a series of light frames that were stiffened via longitudinal corrugations and completed by alclad planking that was riveted to the flanges of the frame. A relatively wide track split-type undercarriage was fitted to the aircraft. A spring-type telescopic strut was present that ran to the underside of the forward spar, bent axle hinges were located on the centerline of the base of the fuselage in line with the forward spar, while the radius rod ran to the rear spar.

The cabin of the Cruiser was relatively well arranged. Comfortable seating was arranged along the sides of the cabin while lighting was provided via a combination of lights within the roof as well as the side windows, the latter permitted a generous external view to the passengers. A single gangway was present across the centre of the cabin. Four of the seats were placed between the wing spars while the pilot's seat (on the port side) and that of the fifth passenger were forwards of the leading edge of the wing. The windows in the sides of the cabin, which could slide for ventilation purposes, were triplex while the roof windows were composed of celluloid. Directly aft of the cabin was a sizable space intended for the stowage of luggage.

The Cruiser was typically powered by a total of three de Havilland Gipsy Major inverted inline piston engines, two of which were mounted on the wings while the third engine was installed within the nose of the aircraft. Dependent upon customer preferences, alternative engines could be fitted of similar power output and general characteristics. Steel tube engine mountings were used while those engines on the wings were carefully faired with the surface of the wing. Due the central engine being positioned relatively high above the ground, it was fitted with hand-turning gear, while the outboard propellers, which were within reach from the ground, permitted the starting of the outboard engines simply by swinging their propellers. The aircraft was designed to fly on any two of its three engines, as well as to cruise at sufficiently low power expenditure that engine failures were believed to be relatively uncommon to occur. It was therefore claimed that it was unlikely that any Cruiser would even find itself having to perform a forced landing.

An all-wood cantilever monoplane wing was fitted. Its structure comprised two primary box-section spars that met with spruce flanges and three-ply sides; the ribs of the wing also featured flanges along with three-ply webs. The wing had a three-ply covering that provided considerable torsional stiffness; it was thickened and further stiffened at areas close to the fuselage to form a walkway to the cabin door. The aircraft's tail unit comprised a duralumin structure covered with doped fabric. Both the rudder and elevators were provided with horn balances while trimming of the tail was achieved via a screw jack that was operated by a wheel in the cockpit. Both the elevator and ailerons were actuated via by a hand wheel on a hinged column, a readily-adjustable bar was used for controlling the rudder. A series of rods and cables ran between the flight controls and the various control surfaces across the aircraft. Similarly, rods and torque-shafts were used for the engine controls.

Fuel was housed within two primary tanks located within the wing between the primary spars; each tank had capacity of 60 U.S. gallons (230 liters). However, these tanks were not typically completely full, particularly when the aircraft was configured to carry passengers; instead, they would only contain enough fuel for roughly four hours at the aircraft's cruising speed. The tanks were interconnected by large balance pipes; fuel pumps were used to supply each engine, feeding directly into their carburetor. To mitigate against the failure of a single pump, a cross connection permitted each engine to be supplied by another pump. The oil tanks were located in the fairings behind each engine.

== Operational history ==
Spartan Air Lines Ltd was formed to operate Cruisers between London and Cowes, Isle of Wight. In April 1933, Spartan Air Lines initially operated the one Cruiser I (G-ABTY) and two Cruiser IIs (G-ACDW and G-ACDX) from Heston Aerodrome. Iraq Airwork Limited ordered one aircraft for an experimental air route between Baghdad and Mosul, with a further aircraft being ordered by Misr Airwork, the Egyptian branch of Airwork. Two Cruiser IIs and one Cruiser III were impressed into RAF service in 1940.

== Operators ==
=== Civil operators ===
Czechoslovakia

- Bata Shoe Company

Egypt

- Misr Airwork Limited

India

- Maharajah of Patiala

Iraq

- Iraq Airwork Limited

Kingdom of Yugoslavia

- Aeroput

United Kingdom

- British Airways Limited (1936–1940)
- Northern and Scottish Airways (1936)
- Railway Air Services (1936)
- Scottish Airways (1936–1938)
- Spartan Air Lines (1933–1935)
- United Airways (1934)

=== Military operators ===
Kingdom of Yugoslavia

- Royal Yugoslav Air Force - Two aircraft impressed into military service in 1940.

United Kingdom

- Royal Air Force

== Surviving aircraft ==
The fuselage of a Cruiser III (G-ACYK) is on display at the National Museum of Flight, East Fortune, Scotland. This aircraft crashed on 14 January 1938; in 1973, the cabin section was moved by helicopter from the crash site on the Hill of Stake near Largs to the museum.

== Specifications (Cruiser II) ==
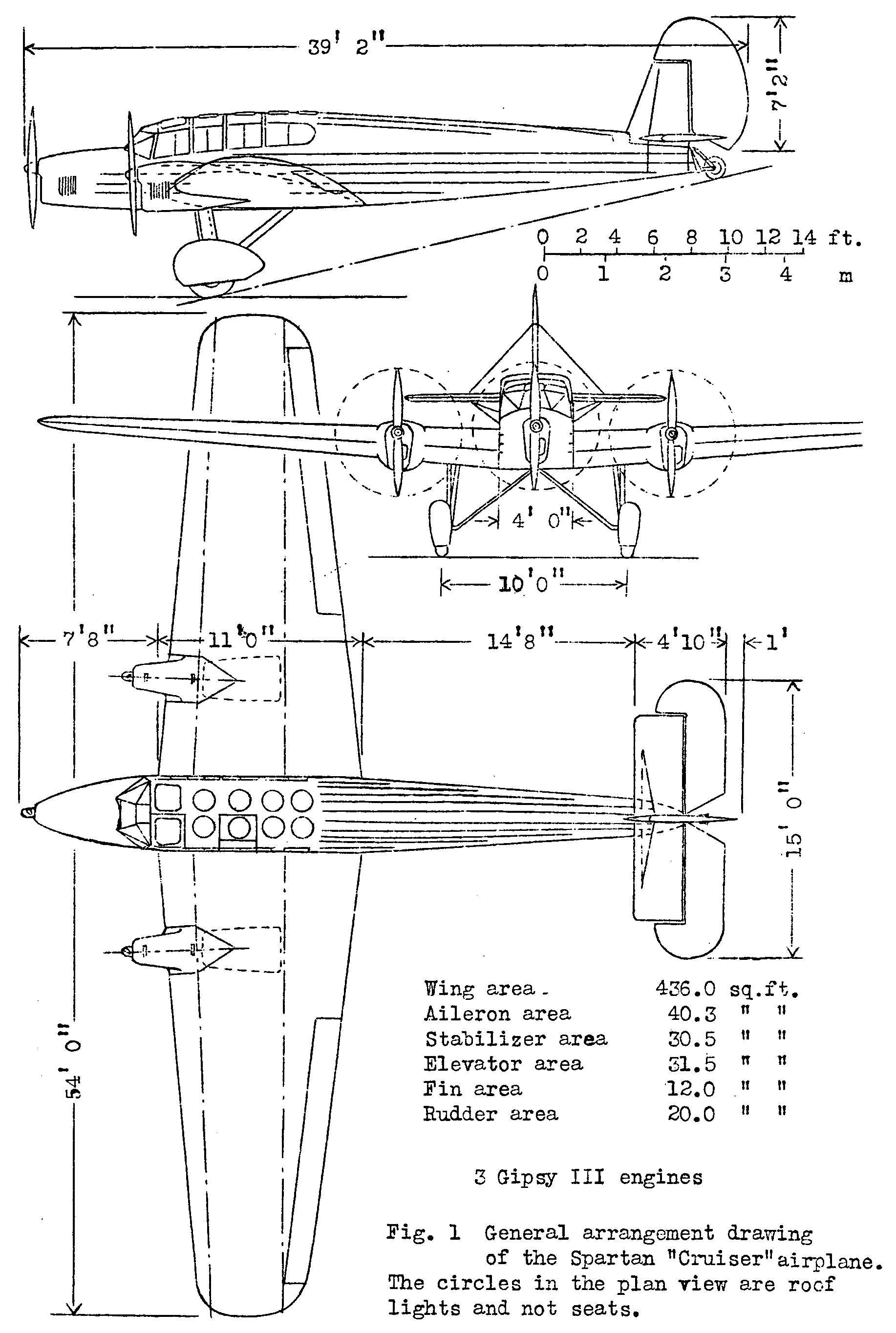
Spartan Cruiser 3-view drawing from NACA-AC-168

Data from British Civil Aircraft since 1919, National Advisory Committee for Aeronautics

General characteristics

- Crew: Two
- Capacity: Six passengers
- Length: 39 ft 2 in (11.94 m)
- Wingspan: 54 ft 0 in (16.46 m)
- Height: 10 ft 0 in (3.05 m)
- Wing area: 436 sq ft (40.50 m^{2})
- Empty weight: 3,650 lb (1,656 kg)
- Max takeoff weight: 6,200 lb (2,812 kg)
- Powerplant: 3 × de Havilland Gipsy Major inverted inline piston engine, 130 hp (97 kW) each

Performance

- Maximum speed: 133 mph (214 km/h, 115.5 kn)
- Cruise speed: 115 mph (185 km/h, 100 kn)
- Range: 310 mi (499 km, 270 nmi)
- Service ceiling: 15,000 ft (4,570 m)
- Rate of climb: 630 ft/min (3.2 m/s)

== See also ==
Aircraft of comparable role, configuration, and era

- Fiat G.2
- PZL.27
