= Blackpool Zoo =

Zoo in Lancashire, England

- Blackpool Zoo logo
- Interactive map of Blackpool Zoo
- 53°48′56″N 3°0′46″W
- Date opened: 6 July 1972
- Location: Blackpool, Lancashire, England
- Land area: 32 acres (13 ha)
- No. of animals: 1,350
- Memberships: BIAZA, EAZA
- Major exhibits: Project Elephant Base Camp, Orangutan Outlook, Gorilla Mountain, Active Oceans, Lemur Wood, Wolf Ridge, Big Cat Habitat, Children's Farm, Giraffe Heights
- Owner: Parques Reunidos
- Website: www.blackpoolzoo.org.uk

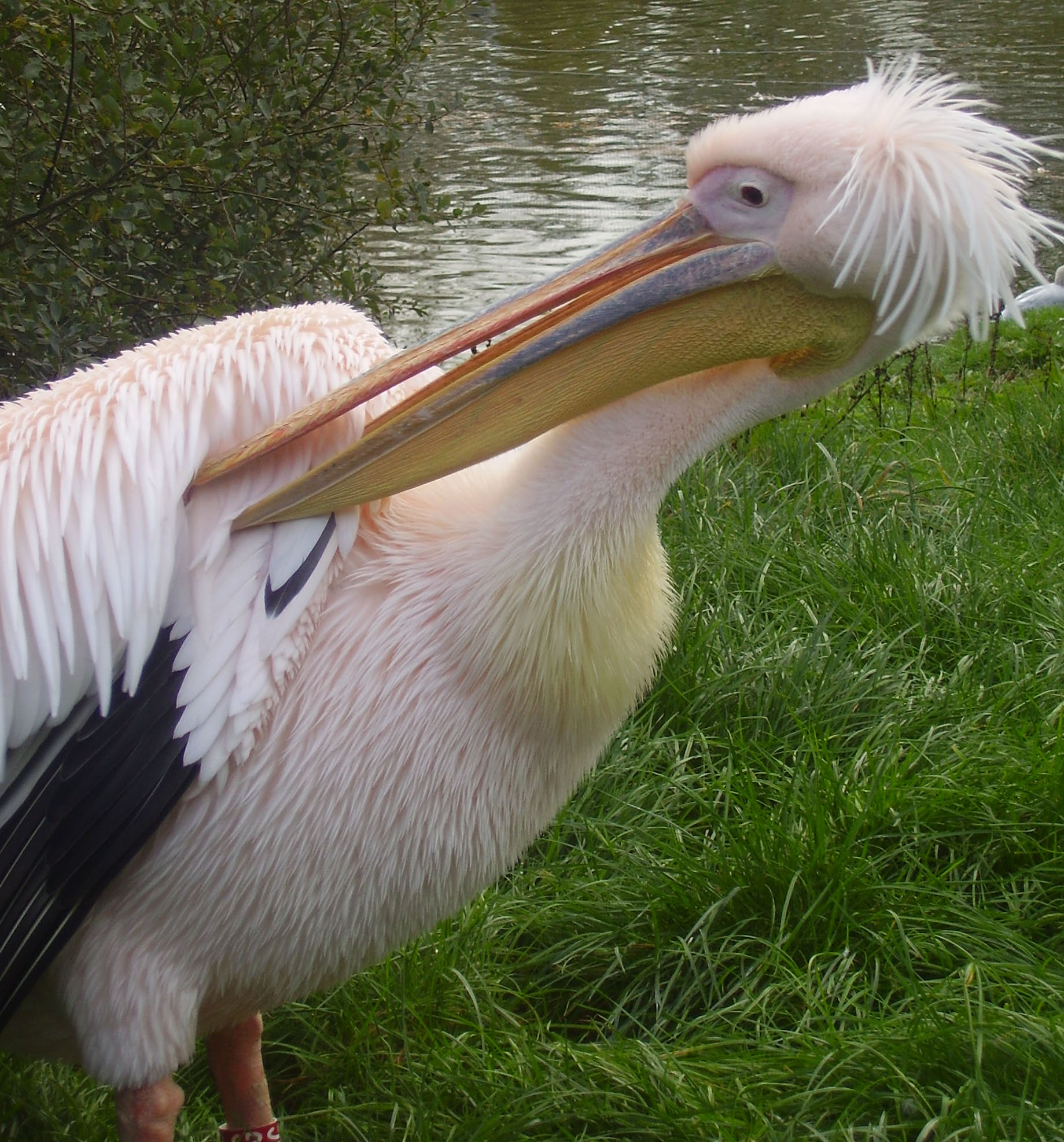
Pelican outside the lemur walkthrough

Blackpool Zoo is a 32-acre (13 ha) zoo, owned by Parques Reunidos and located in the sea-side resort of Blackpool, Lancashire, England. It cares for over 1,000 animals from all over the world.

== History ==
The Blackpool Zoo opened in 1972 on a site which had previously been the Stanley Park Aerodrome.

2005 saw the opening of the 'Dinosaur Safari', a walkthrough exhibition featuring models of 32 life-size dinosaurs around a trail. "Amazonia" opened in 2006. This is a walk-through enclosure of South American animals and birds including squirrel monkeys.

Giraffes were re-introduced to the zoo in 2008, after an absence of fourteen years, and over £0.5m was invested in the new giraffe house and pens.

In summer 2009, penguins were to be added to the list of animals at the zoo, with the arrival of twenty Magellanic penguins from two Spanish conservation centres. A£1m sealion pool was opened in May 2010 along with the addition of a male sealion from Spain. 2011 saw the opening of a new Children's Farm and the expansion and refurbishment of the main restaurant.

== Animals and exhibits ==
=== Orangutan Outlook ===
Reopened in 2014, following a £1 million transformation, Orangutan Outlook is home to five Bornean orangutans – a male named Kawan (arrived in 2022 from Apenheul Primate Park) and three females; Cherie (born at the zoo in 1997), Summer (Cherie's sister and born at the zoo in 2002), Jingga (arrived in 2017 from Barcelona Zoo) and another male named Jarang born at the zoo to Kawan and Jingga in 2023. The upper viewing area is also home to a tank with Chinese water dragons and a Philippine sailfin lizard. Vicky, the first orangutan to be born at the zoo and mother of Cherie and Summer, died in 2019.

=== Project Elephant ===
Project Elephant is the single biggest development investment in the zoo's history and was built on previously undeveloped land. The multimillion-pound investment includes an outdoor grass paddock, sand paddock, pool and the largest indoor elephant house in the UK.

In 2017, the zoo's female elephant, Kate, moved into her new home. She has since been joined by four female elephants, Noor-Jahan, Esha, Tara and Minbu, from Twycross Zoo. The new house, named Project Elephant Base Camp, opened to the public in March 2018. Two more females, Noorjahan and Esha, arrived from Twycross Zoo during summer 2018. In October 2019 bull elephant Emmett arrived from Whipsnade Zoo as part of the European Endangered Species Programme and he is the first bull elephant in the 47th history at Blackpool Zoo.

=== Old Elephant and Reptile House ===
Since the opening of Project Elephant Base Camp, the old Elephant and Reptile House has remained home to the majority of the zoo's reptile, amphibian, invertebrate, and fish collections. Species here include rhinoceros iguanas, reticulated pythons, Nile monitors, red-footed tortoises, leopard tortoises, prehensile-tailed skinks, Jamaican boas, California kingsnakes, Home's hinge-back tortoises, axolotls, African clawed frogs, red-bellied piranhas, Madagascar hissing cockroaches, giant African land snails, house spiders, orb weavers and superb starlings. Yacare caimans are held in the foyer. The former elephant area of the house is currently home to a group of Bactrian camels. No plans have been announced over the future of this area.

In the summer of 2018, the Reptile House was closed to the public and is due for renovations.

=== Gorilla Mountain ===
Opened in 2000, Gorilla Mountain is home to six western lowland gorillas – a silverback male named Bukavu, three females named Miliki, Njema and Meisie (the daughter of Bukavu and Miliki, who was born in 2010), Moanda (who is the offspring of Bukavu and Njema and was born in 2012) and Makari (who is the son of Bukavu and Miliki and was born in September 2017).

=== Lemur Wood ===
Opened in 1999, Lemur Wood was Blackpool Zoo's first walk-through enclosure, and houses troops of ring-tailed lemurs, red-fronted lemurs and red ruffed lemurs.

=== Active Oceans ===
The zoo's sea lion pool, which houses California sea lions, was first built in the 1970s and is the largest sea lion pool in a British zoo. It has a 250-seat arena that allows visitors to watch the sea lions interact with their trainers, who use positive reinforcement training. The penguin enclosure, which is next to the sea lion pool, opened in 2009 and houses Magellanic penguins. Blackpool Zoo is the only zoo in the UK to keep this species.

=== Giraffe Heights ===
Opened in 2008, Giraffe Heights is home to four female giraffes, named O'Grady, Evie, Olympia and Tiye. During the summer months, two blesbok antelopes share the outdoor grass paddock with the giraffes. The enclosure includes a walkway where visitors can book encounters to hand-feed the giraffes.

=== Big Cat Habitat ===
The new habitat opened in 2023 and is home to two female and one male African lion (Khari, who was born at the zoo in May 2015 to Wallace (who died in May 2022) and Rachel (who died in December 2015)), and two Amur tigers, female Alyona and male Rusty.

In May 2022, in order to carry out renovations to the big cat house, Khari was moved to Whipsnade Zoo and Alyona was moved to Woodside Wildlife Park. They returned to Blackpool Zoo after renovations were completed in spring 2023.

In May 2023, three lionesses named Hira, Emma and Narla moved to the zoo from West Midland Safari Park to form a pride with Khari.

In June 2023, a male Amur tiger named Rusty moved to the zoo from Longleat to be paired with Alyona.

=== Wolf Ridge ===
Wolf Ridge was opened in 2012 and built on land which was previously unused. It houses two Iberian wolves named Julio and Antonio.

=== Wallaby Walkabout ===
Opened in 2010, this enclosure displays red-necked wallabies and both western grey and red kangaroos.

=== Small Primate House ===
One of the oldest functioning animal houses in the zoo, the small primate house is the centre of the zoo's primate collection and includes De Brazza's monkeys, pileated gibbons, L'Hoest's monkeys, king colobus, ring-tailed lemurs, red titis, emperor tamarins and grey mouse lemurs. Prevost's squirrels are by the entrance and inside is a herp exhibit for Graham's anoles and White's tree frogs.

=== Waders and Waddlers ===
This is the zoo's wetland bird aviary, built on the site of the old Children's Farm's waterfowl lake. The aviary is home to a variety of birds, including grey crowned cranes, demoiselle cranes, sacred ibises, scarlet ibises, black-crowned night herons, Inca terns, African spoonbills, northern bald ibises and common eiders.

=== Flamingo Lake ===
The zoo has a long lake that is divided into two. One section is for great white pelicans, and the other side is for American flamingos and several waterfowl species, including red-breasted geese, ruddy shelducks, Ross's geese, greylag geese, emperor geese, brown pintails, red-crested pochards and several others. There is also an island in the flamingo habitat for emperor tamarins.

=== Semi-Nocturnal House ===
What was once the zoo's nocturnal house, this building has now been converted into the main house for red titis which the zoo holds the studbook for. Also to be seen here a dwarf mongooses and Emei Shan liocichlas.

=== Children's Farm ===
Opened in May 2011, this area is aimed primarily at children and offers hands-on experiences with several domesticated animals, including donkeys, pigs, geese, rabbits, cows, alpacas, chickens, ferrets, guinea pigs, pygmy goats and Ouessant sheep.

=== Other Animals ===
Other species in Blackpool Zoo's collection include red pandas, meerkats, Bactrian camels, Oriental small-clawed otters, South American tapirs, aardvarks, giant anteaters, wild yaks, oryxes, asian elephants, penguins, Hartmann's mountain zebras, cottontop tamarins, Bornean orangutans, great grey owl, Von der Decken's hornbill, rainbow lorikeets, ostriches, pileated gibbons, eastern white pelicans, Nile monitors, reticulated pythons, White's tree frogs and giant African land snails, among others.

=== Dinosaur Safari ===
Dinosaur Safari is a walk-through area opened in 2005. It displays over thirty life-size, fiberglass statues of extinct animals, including Tyrannosaurus rex, Triceratops, Stegosaurus, Tanystropheus, Dimetrodon, Mamenchisaurus, Coelophysis, Spinosaurus, Tylosaurus, Smilodon and the Woolly mammoth, among others. The area has undergone a significant transformation and reopened in July 2019, with newly painted dinosaurs, landscaped gardens, fresh signage, new animatronic dinosaurs, a fossil dig and a fully functioning water display from a central volcano.

== Miniature railway ==
The railway is 15 in (381 mm) gauge and about 820 yards (750 m) long. Severn Lamb originally supplied two diesel locomotives which had steam-outline bodies of American appearance, and four toastrack carriages seating a max of 56 passengers as two bays have been converted to take pushchairs and bags.

Only one engine still remains in operation, having extensive work carried out to replace the 3 cylinder kabota engine and radiator, the bodywork and carriages are still all original bar new wooden floors and composite seating.

Top speed of around 20 kilometres per hour (12 mph) this train passes many animals along its journey between the two stations where now only south is used for boarding and north is a turning around point or exit platform only. Costing £3, the journey takes 15mins (5 mins each way plus turn around time)

== Layout and facilities ==
Wheelchairs and pushchairs are available to hire from the zoo's reception. The zoo is built on entirely flat land with all areas being easily accessible.

Blackpool Zoo features two main catering outlets, with a number of additional satellite kiosks. The main cafe, known as the Lakeview Cafe, serves a mixture of hot food, fast food, salads and drinks. There is an adjoining conservatory selling ice creams and refreshments.

In the main entrance there is a coffee shop, selling light snacks and Starbucks drinks. A new Asian themed eatery has recently opened near the Dinosaur Safari, serving noodles and rice dishes. The BBQ Kiosk towards the rear of the park serves hot dogs, chips and refreshments during the summer months.

There are two main shops in the zoo – one located within the main entrance building and a smaller, seasonal shop located adjoining the Amazonia exhibit.

The zoo features a lecture theatre and smaller meeting room which are available to hire for private functions.

Blackpool zoo is known to offer up to 40% reductions to residents of Lancashire.

== Playbarn ==
The zoo also features a multi-level, jungle themed, indoor soft play area – known as the Playbarn.

Entry to the Playbarn is additional to the zoo, and it can be used by members of the public without needing to visit the zoo.

== See also ==
- Lakes Aquarium
