= Stapleford Aerodrome =

Airport in Essex, England

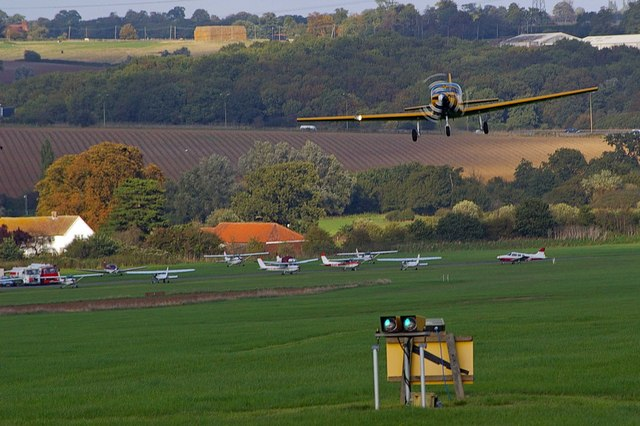
- Aircraft flying from the aerodrome
- IATA: none; ICAO: EGSG

Summary
- Airport type: Private
- Operator: Stapleford Flight Centre
- Location: Stapleford Tawney, Essex, England
- Elevation AMSL: 185 ft / 56 m
- Coordinates: 51°39′09″N 000°09′22″E

Map
- Location in Essex

Runways
| Direction | Length | | Surface |
| Direction | m | ft | Surface |
|---|---|---|---|
| 03R/21L | 1,077 | 3,533 | Grass/asphalt insert |
| 03L/21R | 900 | 2,953 | Grass |
| 10/28 unlicensed | 715 | 2,346 | Grass |
- Sources: UK AIP at NATS

Stapleford Aerodrome (ICAO: EGSG) is an operational general aviation aerodrome in the Epping Forest district of Essex, England, near the village of Abridge. It is about 3.4 nautical miles (6.3 km; 3.9 mi) south of North Weald Airfield and 4.5 NM (8.3 km; 5.2 mi) north of Romford. The airfield is just within the M25, close to the junction with the M11.

Stapleford Aerodrome has a CAA Ordinary Licence (Number P472) that allows flights for the public transport of passengers or for flying instruction as authorised by the licensee (Herts & Essex Aero Club Limited).

== History ==
=== The 1930s ===
Stapleford opened as Essex Aerodrome in 1933 as a base for Hillman's Airways, which provided a service to Paris and other European cities using De Havilland DH.84 Dragon and DH.89 Dragon Rapide biplanes. Amy Johnson was one of the Hillman Airways pilots. After running into financial difficulties, Hillman was bought up by Whitehall Security Corporation Ltd and merged with three other airlines that they already owned to form British Airways Ltd. Operations began in 1936, but after four months, all flights were moved to Heston Aerodrome, leaving just a small number of private aircraft.

The RAF took an interest in the airfield in 1937, and in 1938 No. 21 Elementary and Reserve Flying Training School RAF was established at Stapleford. Training was provided by Reid and Sigrist Ltd, under contract to the Air Ministry. One of the most famous students was J.E. "Johnnie" Johnson who became the RAF's top scoring pilot and reached the rank of air vice-marshal.

=== Second World War ===
The airfield was requisitioned shortly after the start of the Second World War as RAF Stapleford Tawney. A long perimeter track and dispersal points were built and some accommodation buildings were erected. By the end of March 1940 the airfield was ready to become a satellite station for RAF North Weald.

The first squadron to make regular use of Stapleford was No. 151 Squadron, making patrols from the base from August 1940. Six aircraft were lost and two pilots, including squadron leader Eric King, killed in action on 30 August. After a short stay, the squadron was moved to RAF Digby, Lincolnshire, but one aircraft struck a crane after takeoff and burst into flames. The pilot, Pilot Officer Richard Ambrose, was killed; he is buried in Epping cemetery.

No. 46 Squadron arrived in September, having lost all their Hawker Hurricane fighters when the aircraft carrier HMS Glorious was sunk while evacuating the squadron from Norway.

Other units to use Stapleford included the secret No. 419 Flight, formed in August 1940 as the operational air-arm of the Special Operations Executive (SOE). They were intended to use Armstrong Whitworth Whitleys to drop agents and supplies behind enemy lines. Westland Lysanders would be used to pick up agents as well as other important people. Because of heavy Luftwaffe attacks on North Weald, the flight moved to Stapleford on 4 September. The Whitley was a rather large aircraft to use Stapleford's grass runways. Only two operations were carried out from Stapleford; one to Brest and the other to Fontainebleau. The flight then moved to RAF Stradishall, Suffolk, on 9 October.

Other squadrons at Stapleford were No. 242 Squadron and the RAF's oldest, No. 3 Squadron and, in 1941, a new Air Sea Rescue squadron was formed at Stapleford – No. 277 Squadron.

In March 1943, Stapleford was taken out of Fighter Command and placed under the command of No. 34 Wing of the Army Co-operation Command.

Stapleford played an important part in the preparations for D-Day and many units arrived. On 20 November 1944 a V-2 rocket landed in the middle of the airfield leaving a crater 60 feet in diameter. On 23 January 1945 another rocket landed on the airfield camp site, killing 17 personnel and injuring 50. A number of the personnel are buried in the church cemetery at North Weald.

Stapleford's wartime role ended in 1945, with the last personnel leaving before VE Day.

A memorial at the airfield recalls those who died.

The following units were also here at some point:

- No. 1 Camouflage Unit RAF
- No. 24 (Base) Defence Wing RAF
- No. 420 Repair & Salvage Unit
- No. 421 Repair & Salvage Unit
- No. 656 Squadron RAF
- No. 658 Squadron RAF
- No. 2720 Squadron RAF Regiment
- No. 2727 Squadron RAF Regiment
- No. 2751 Squadron RAF Regiment
- No. 2759 Squadron RAF Regiment
- No. 2773 Squadron RAF Regiment
- No. 2839 Squadron RAF Regiment
- No. 2881 Squadron RAF Regiment
- No. 3202 Servicing Commando

=== Post-war ===
In 1946, Stapleford Aerodrome was taken over by the Royal Engineers. 869 Mechanical Equipment Squadron RE was the only plant unit in the UK and held a large inventory of bulldozers, scrapers, road rollers, cranes, excavators, draglines and all the plant items that the army had acquired – most of it worn out. The newest of the equipment was used throughout the UK in clearing minefields (armoured bulldozers) and constructing shooting ranges. The unit name was changed to Number 1 Plant Park Squadron RE and moved to Bordon, Hampshire, in September 1948.

In 1953 Roger Frogley and his brother Buster transferred the Herts and Essex Aero club from Broxbourne in Hertfordshire to Stapleford. The hangars were renovated and they began flying Tiger Moths and Austers.

In 1955 Edgar Percival, the famous pre-war aircraft designer, set up a company at Stapleford under his name and started a production line for his EP9 crop-spraying aircraft. A total of 40 aircraft were built.

== Today ==
The airfield is home to the privately owned Stapleford Flight Centre. For around 40 years, it has trained pilots for PPL up to CPL and ATPL qualifications. It has a fleet of over 40 aircraft. Other companies on the site provide business charter services, London sightseeing flights and aircraft engineering services.

The airfield has two parallel runways, designated 03/21, one being partly asphalt at one end, and a shorter grass runway, designated 10/28.

Lambourne VOR is located at the south of the airfield.

The Royal Air Force often uses the airfield as a helicopter staging base for major flypasts over London.

== Accidents and incidents ==
On 3 October 2015, a Beechcraft King Air 200 G-BYCP operated by London Executive Aviation crashed shortly after departure, killing both pilots on board.

== See also ==
- Airports of London - Wikipedia
