= British Continental Airways =

1930s British airline

- Founded: 15 April 1935
- Commenced operations: 1935
- Ceased operations: October 1936
- Operating bases: Croydon Airport
- Fleet size: See Aircraft below
- Headquarters: United Kingdom

British Continental Airways was a British airline that operated between 1935 and 1936, when it merged into British Airways.

== History ==
British Continental Airways Limited was formed on 15 April 1935 to operate airline services from Croydon Airport to the continent. The first services were to Belgium; as well as Brussels, other Belgian destinations were added over the first year, including Ostend and Antwerp. Services were also run to Lille in France and Amsterdam in the Netherlands. In partnership with KLM the airline operated a service between Amsterdam and Liverpool with a stop at Doncaster.

Originally formed as a private company, it became a public company on 31 October 1935 with a share capital of £50,000. The airline became part of a dispute at the start of 1936 when it started a Scandinavian service as an extension of the Amsterdam route in competition with British Airways, as a government subsidy and a mail contract had already been given to British Airways. The government suggested that the two airlines should merge. From 1 August 1936 BCA and the Scandinavian routes were absorbed into British Airways, although the Belgian routes continued to be operated under the BCA name for a further two months.

== Fleet ==
At the time of the merger with British Airways, British Continental Airways had the following:

- 1 × De Havilland Dragon named "St Christopher", originally owned by one of the founders of the airline, Graham Mackinnon.
- 1 × De Havilland DH.86 named "St George", delivered in August 1935.
- 3 × De Havilland DH.86A. A further aircraft was on order and subsequently delivered to British Airways.
- 3 × De Havilland Dragon Rapides named "St Andrew", "St Patrick", and "St David".

== See also ==
- List of defunct airlines of the United Kingdom

== Bibliography ==
- Doyle, Neville (2001). The Triple Alliance - The predecessors of the first British Airways. Air-Britain. ISBN 0-85130-286-6.
