= Crilly Airways =

British airline (1930s)

- Commenced operations: 1935
- Ceased operations: 9 September 1936
- Frequent-flyer program: See below
- Fleet size: 2 de Havilland Dragons; 4 Fokker F.XIIs; 1 de Havilland Fox Moth; 2 General Aircraft Monospar
- Headquarters: Braunstone, Leicestershire, England
- Key people: Frederick Leo Crilly (founder)

Crilly Airways Ltd was a former British airline founded by entrepreneur Frederick Leo Crilly. The airline operated passenger services between several cities in England in the mid-1930s. The airline started with a capitalization of £12,000.

== History ==
Crilly Airways started up running two eight seat de Havilland Dragons from Braunstone, a suburb of Leicester. The first of these two aircraft was christened Spirit of Doncaster. They also operated a de Havilland Fox Moth and two General Aircraft Monospar twin-engined monoplanes.

In 1935, Crilly Airways sought government approval to operate an air service between Britain and Ireland but was refused. It was the Irish government's intention to operate a national airline between the two countries.

The airline was the first to offer a frequent-flyer programme.

Crilly Airways bought four twelve-seater Fokker F.XIIs from KLM. Using these planes, the airline was the first to run an airmail service between Portugal and England, opening this service on 1 February 1936. At the Portuguese capital, Lisbon, one of the Fokker F.XIIs was christened Lisboa ("Lisbon") by Menina Maria do Carmo Carmona Costa, the young granddaughter of the nation's president. It was Crilly's intention to extend this service to Gibraltar and West Africa, but this plan came to nought when the Spanish government refused the airline permission to overfly its territory during the Spanish Civil War.

Unable to survive financially following the failure of the Portuguese venture, the company ceased trading on 9 September 1936 and entered receivership. British Airways Ltd. bought the aircraft and started the company British Airways Iberia Ltd. with Crilly as managing director. But this company also soon went bankrupt.

The planes were then sold, via shady deals, to the Spanish Nationalists in the Spanish Civil War.

== See also ==
- List of defunct airlines of the United Kingdom
