= Stanley Park Aerodrome =

Airfield in Lancashire, England

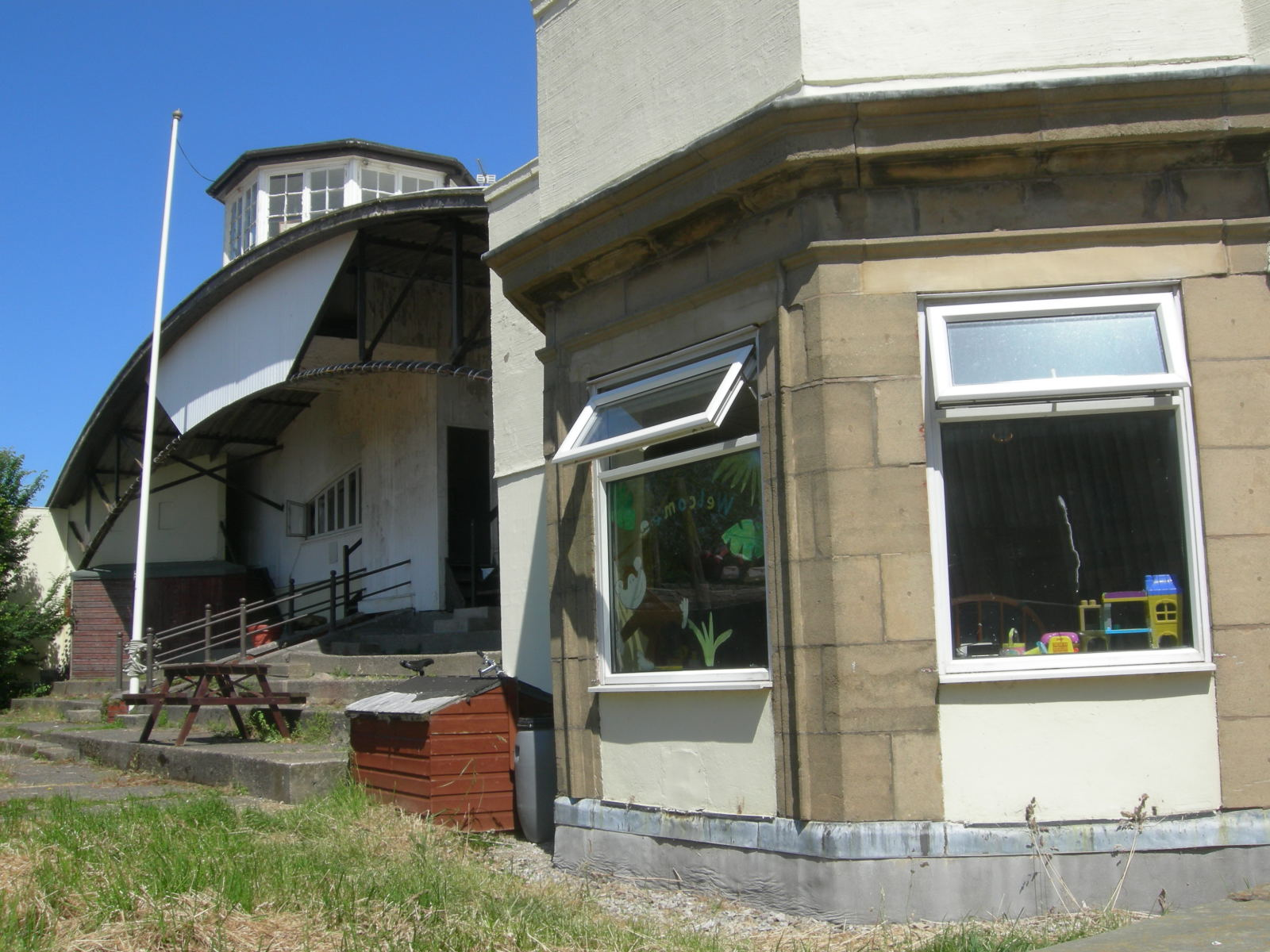
- 1930s club house (centre), offices (right) and observation/control tower (top) taken from the airfield site in June 2009. It was used as an elephant enclosure for a while but then changed to camels to give the elephants more space.
- IATA: none; ICAO: none

Summary
- Airport type: Civil aerodrome
- Owner/Operator: Blackpool Corporation
- Location: Blackpool, Lancashire, England
- Elevation AMSL: 45 ft / 14 m
- Coordinates: 53°48′56″N 003°00′46″W

Map
- Former location in Blackpool

Runways
| Direction | Length | | Surface |
| Direction | ft | m | Surface |
|---|---|---|---|
| NW – SE | 2,100 | 640 | Grass |

Stanley Park Aerodrome was an airfield located in the Stanley Park area of Blackpool, Lancashire, England. It was also known as Blackpool Municipal Airport, and was in use for civil and military flying from 1929 until closure of the airfield in 1947. The site is now used by Blackpool Zoo.

== Early history ==
Despite the existence of the Squires Gate site, now Blackpool Airport, which had been used intermittently for flying since October 1909, Blackpool Corporation decided in 1928 to build a new airfield close to Stanley Park. The aerodrome was located 1.7 mi (2.7 km) east south east of North Pier at an elevation of 45 ft (14 m) above sea level.

It occupied 120 acres (49 ha) of a 400 acres (160 ha) site acquired by the corporation for aviation and sports use under the Blackpool Improvement Act 1928. The aerodrome was completed, licensed and opened for use in August 1929. After the erection in early 1931 of a hangar and a clubhouse and offices with an observation/control tower on top, the aerodrome was officially opened on 2 June 1931 by the prime minister Ramsay MacDonald. The all-grass airfield's surface was small, with the longest landing run available (NW/SE) being 2,100 ft (640 m) in length.

== Early operations ==
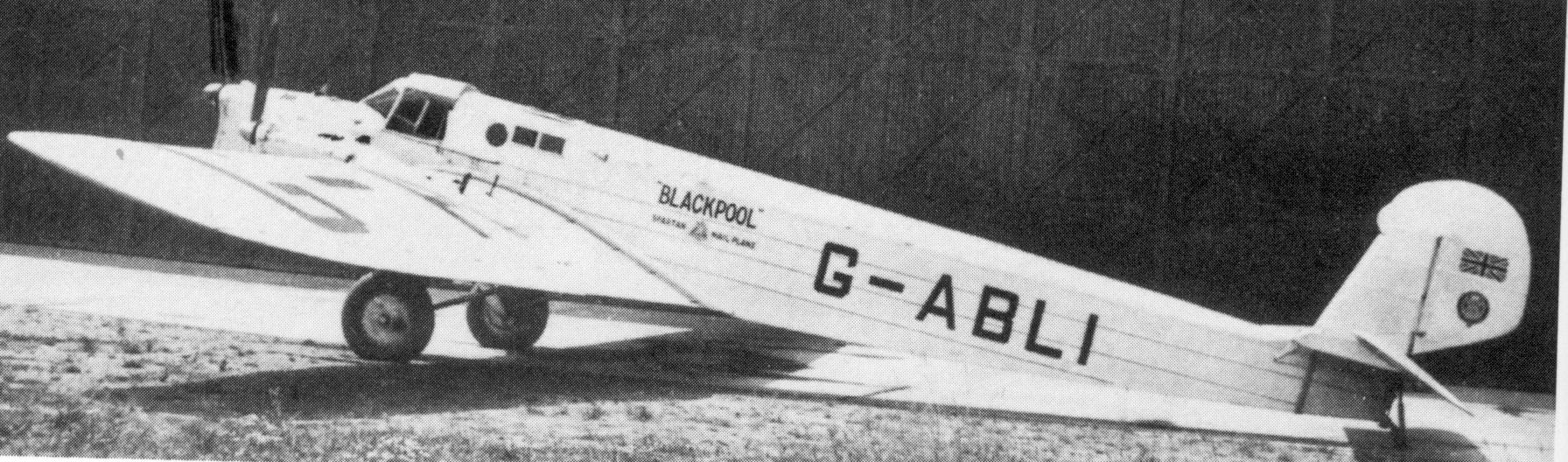
Spartan Mailplane Blackpool in 1932, before its flight from Stanley Park Aerodrome to Karachi

For the first few years the airfield was used aircraft owned by private individuals and flying clubs. These were housed in an art deco hangar and terminal building, parts of which still survive in use within Blackpool Zoo. On 15 June 1932, T. Neville Stack departed from the aerodrome at the controls of Spartan Mailplane G-ABLI on the first leg of a flight to Karachi, India, carrying two passengers. After being named Blackpool, the aircraft was given a civic send-off and reached Drigh Road aerodrome 5 days 23 hours 50 minutes later.

A public Air Pageant was held at Stanley Park on 26 June 1932. Another public event was held on 7 September 1935 during which Alan Cobhams National Aviation Day Circus performed. Pleasure flights were available to the public, but tragedy ensued when an Avro 504 biplane of Air Travel Ltd collided over the outskirts of Blackpool, with Cobham's Westland Wessex monoplane. The pilot and two sisters from Blackpool were killed in the Avro, but the pilot of the Wessex skillfully brought his aircraft and four passengers to a non-fatal crash-landing.

== Inter-war airline operations ==
=== United Airways Ltd ===
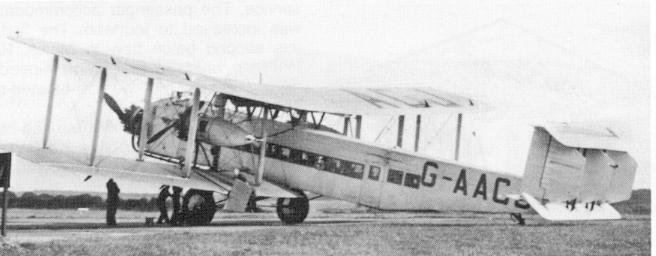
United Airways used this A.W. Argosy on pleasure flights from the aerodrome during 1935

The first scheduled air services from Stanley Park Aerodrome were operated by the short-lived United Airways to Hall Caine Airport, Isle of Man, during the summer of 1935 using eight-seat de Havilland Dragons. During summer 1935, United Airways flew an ex Imperial Airways Armstrong Whitworth Argosy G-AACJ on pleasure flights from the airfield and on occasion, when passenger numbers warranted, to the Isle of Man (Hall Caine). The Argosy was a large three-engined 20-seat biplane airliner, which had been built in 1929.

Whitehall Securities Corporation, owners of United Airways and their sister airline Spartan Air Lines began to build on their fledgling operation, introducing a schedule from London (Heston Aerodrome) via Stanley Park Aerodrome, Hall Caine and then onwards to Dublin (Collinstown).

=== Railway Air Services ===
Railway Air Services (RAS) had operated schedules from Squires Gate from April 1935, but their flights moved to Stanley Park Aerodrome on 1 June 1937. From 26 September 1937, RAS operations from Blackpool were transferred to Isle of Man Air Services (IoMAS) and these continued until the outbreak of World War II, again operated by Dragon Rapides. Some RAS/IoMAS scheduled flights from Ronaldsway Airport, Isle of Man continued from Stanley Park Aerodrome to Speke Airport, Liverpool and Manchester's Barton Aerodrome.

The scheduled services through Stanley Park Aerodrome were not resumed after the war, the now larger Squires Gate airfield again being used.

== Operations in World War II ==
The airfield was requisitioned at the start of the war and was initially used by the Royal Air Force No.3 School of Technical Training, which used various types of grounded aircraft, including Armstrong Whitworth Whitleys, which were dispersed around the airfield boundary.

Vickers-Armstrongs (VA) established a major aircraft shadow factory at Squires Gate in 1940 for the production of large numbers of Vickers Wellington medium bombers. Vickers took over most of the existing facilities at Stanley Park Aerodrome and used them, and five newly erected temporary Bellman hangars, to house a secondary assembly line. Because of the airfield's short grass runways, the Wellingtons landed at the larger Squires Gate facility after their maiden flights. A total of 2,584 Wellingtons were completed at the two Blackpool aerodromes between September 1940 and summer 1945.

Lancashire Aircraft Corporation (LAC) established an aircraft repair line at Stanley Park Aerodrome which overhauled Bristol Beaufighters for return to service with the RAF. Later, some Hawker Hurricanes were flown in and reduced to scrap metal. No.181 Gliding School RAF used Kirby Cadet gliders at Stanley Park Aerodrome between 1943 and 1947 to train air cadets.

== Postwar activities ==
A limited amount of charter flying was performed from Stanley Park Aerodrome during early 1946 by LAC using de Havilland Dragon Rapide biplane airliners. However, the airline transferred to the better facilities at Squires Gate and flying from Stanley Park Aerodrome ceased in 1947.

However, although seemingly undocumented, the airfield was busy after that date. The 1952 Aerial Survey of the UK shows the runways still visible and numerous aircraft around the hangars waiting to be scrapped. There are at least 35 folded wing Seafires visible with 13 dispersal stains showing where aircraft have been removed for scrapping. In addition there are around 30 Spitfires/Seafires and at least 6 other aircraft to be seen in the photograph.

Until 1970, the site was used to stage the Royal Lancashire Agricultural Show. In that year, the site was acquired for the construction of Blackpool Zoo, which opened to the public in 1972. Several extra large buildings were erected, with the pre-war aerodrome terminal building and hangar and three wartime hangars also being utilised by the zoo.

== Bibliography ==
- Jackson, A.J. (1973). British Civil Aircraft since 1919 – Volume 1. Putnam & Company Ltd. ISBN 0-370-10006-9.
- Jackson, A.J. (1974). British Civil Aircraft since 1919 – Volume 3. Putnam & Company Ltd. ISBN 0-370-10014-X.
