= Air-Britain =

UK non-profit aviation society

Air-Britain, traditionally sub-titled 'The International Association of Aviation Enthusiasts', is a non-profit aviation society founded in July 1948. As from 2015, it is constituted as a British charitable trust and book publisher.

== History ==
Air-Britain was formed in 1948 as an amateur association of aviation enthusiasts. In April 1968, it was incorporated into a company limited by guarantee, Air-Britain (Historians) Ltd. On 16 April 2015, the status of Air-Britain changed from a Private company limited by guarantee, in the form of Air-Britain (Historians) Ltd, to a British charity, in the form of The Air-Britain Trust Ltd.

Air-Britain organised an annual international aircraft recognition contest that started with an event in September 1961, for all-comers, and attracted applications from individuals and teams from various sources such as Royal Observer Corps (ROC), Air Training Corps (ATC), and Air-Britain regional branches. The annual aircraft recognition contest was discontinued after the 48th event held at the Royal Air Force Museum London on 21 November 2009.

== Activities ==
With over 2,500 members worldwide, Air-Britain publishes books about worldwide civilian and military aviation, that are sold via bookshops, air show stands, mail order, and via a secure sales website. Two regular journals are published, with coverage of both current and historical aviation themes.

== Journals ==
Aviation World (all aviation) - quarterly
Air-Britain News (current aviation) - monthly
eABN (current aviation) - monthly (electronic magazine version of Air-Britain News)

== Events organised ==
Air-Britain periodically organises events such as international aircraft fly-ins.

== Defunct publications ==
Archived scans of many journals and books are progressively being made available as PDF files on CDs.

Archive (historical civil aviation), 1980 - Dec 2017 (absorbed into Aviation World)
Aeromilitaria (historical military aviation), 1975 - Dec 2017 (absorbed into Aviation World)
British Civil Register News, 1948 - Jun 1953 (renamed British Civil Aviation News)
British Military Serial Numbers, 1950 - Jul 1954 (renamed British Military Aviation News)
Overseas Civil Register News, 1952 - 1957
British Civil Aviation News, Jul 1953 - Dec 1965 (absorbed into Air-Britain Digest)
Overseas Airline News, Jul 1953 - Dec 1963 (absorbed into Air-Britain Digest)
British Military Aviation News, Aug 1954 - Dec 1963 (absorbed into Air-Britain Digest and Aeromilitaria)
Commonwealth Aviation News, Jan 1958 - May 1961 (absorbed into Air-Britain Digest)
European Aviation News, Jan 1958 - Dec 1963 (absorbed into Air-Britain Digest)
Aircraft Movements Review, May 1959 - Dec 1963 (absorbed into Air-Britain Digest)
Air-Britain Digest, 1948 - Dec 2002 (renamed Air-Britain Aviation World)

== See also ==
- List of historical societies § List of aviation societies
