= Hillman's Airways =

Airline of the United Kingdom (1931–1935)

- Founded: November 1931
- Commenced operations: 25 December 1931
- Ceased operations: 30 September 1935 (merged with Spartan Air Lines and United Airways Limited to form British Airways Ltd)
- Hubs: Stapleford Aerodrome
- Destinations: Paris–Le Bourget Airport
- Headquarters: London Road, Romford
- Key people: Edward Henry Hillman

Hillman's Airways was a 1930s British airline which later became part of British Airways.

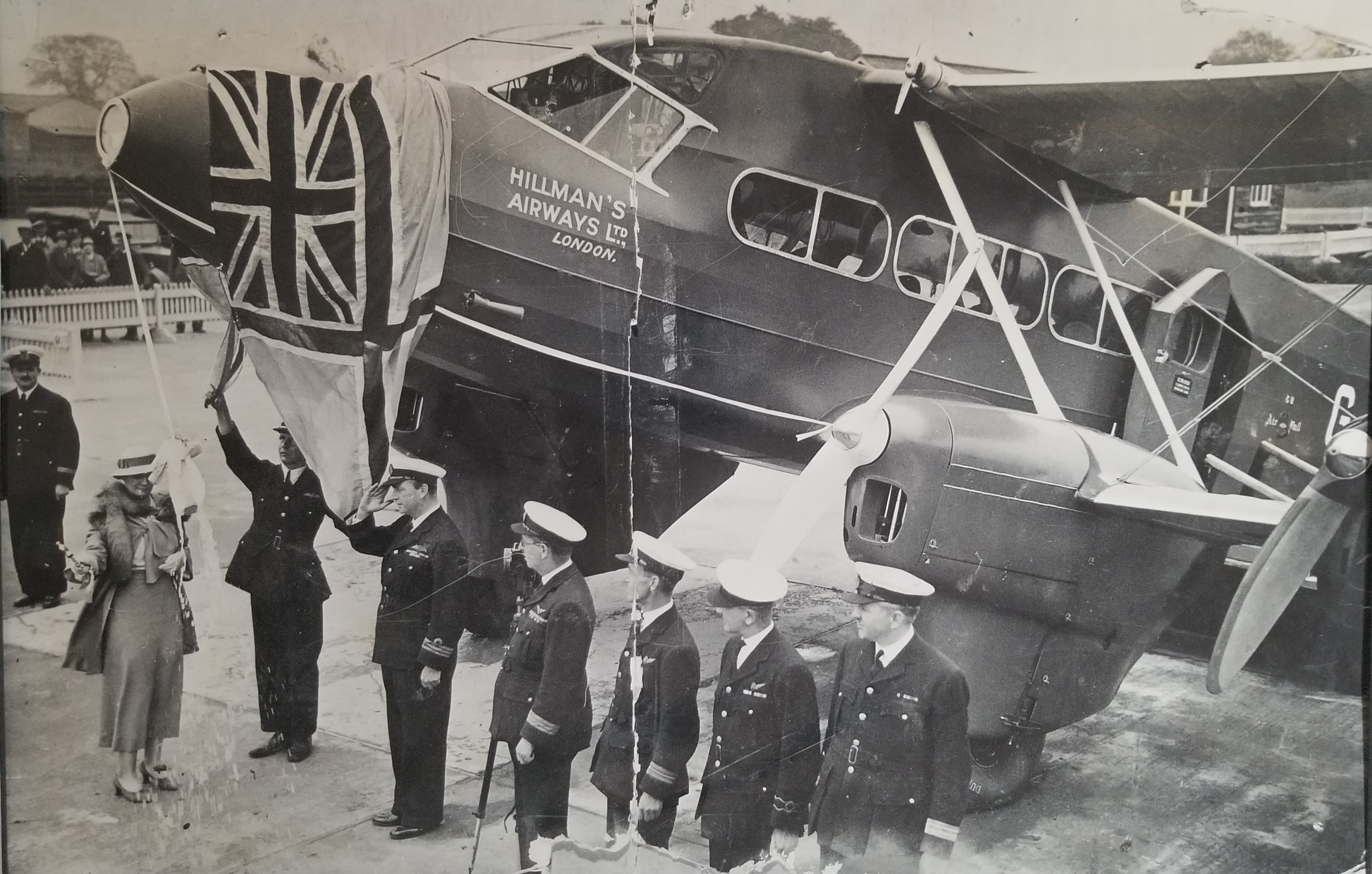
Christening of a DH 86 by wife of Civil Aviation Minister at Stapleford Aerodrome, Abridge

The company was formed in November 1931 as Hillman's Saloon Coaches and Airways Limited by Edward Henry "Ted" Hillman, who was a coach operator in Essex. His previous business had been sold to London Transport following a change in government rules on the expansion of bus routes. The airline's first service was a charter flight on 25 December 1931. It started a scheduled service on 1 April 1932 between Maylands Aerodrome, Romford and Clacton-on-Sea using a de Havilland Puss Moth and a de Havilland Fox Moth, with a fare of £1 return. It was operated every three hours due to the popularity. A de Havilland Dragon was bought to operate an international service between Romford and Paris le Bourget.

From 1 December 1934 the airline was given a contract to fly air mail between London, Liverpool, Glasgow and Belfast, a service formerly operated by the Railway Air Services. Following the award of this contract Hillman changed the legal name from Hillman's Airways Limited to Edward Henry Hillman Limited and the airline extended its services to continental Europe, including Ostend and Brussels. On 1 June 1934 the airline moved its operating base to Stapleford Aerodrome.

Just before Hillman died on 31 December 1934, aged 45, the company became a public company, but within a year it was merged with Spartan Air Lines and United Airways Limited to form British Airways Ltd on 30 September 1935.

== Accidents and incidents ==
- On 2 October 1934, de Havilland Dragon Rapide G-ACPM crashed into the sea off Folkestone causing the death of the pilot and the six passengers.
- On 26 January 1935, de Havilland Dragon Rapide G-ACPO, operating a mail flight from Aldergrove Airport, Belfast to Stapleford Aerodrome, Abridge, Essex via Speke Airport, Liverpool crashed at Derbyhaven, Isle of Man, while attempting to divert to Ronaldsway Airport during bad weather.
- On 21 February 1935, two American sisters, Jane and Elizabeth Du Bois, jumped from a Hillman's Airways de Havilland Dragon G-ACEV en route from Stapleford Aerodrome to Paris. They were the only passengers, having bought all the seats on the aircraft, but claiming before take-off that their companions could not travel that day. Their bodies were found on waste ground in Upminster, but the pilot only became aware of what had happened some time later when over the English Channel. The women were the daughters of the American Consul in Naples, Court Du Bois. The women had been well-known society figures and press speculation linked their double suicide with the recent deaths of two R.A.F. pilots whom they had been romantically linked to. The pilots had been both killed in the crash of a Short Singapore flying boat near Messina, Italy less than a week before.

== See also ==
- List of defunct airlines of the United Kingdom
