= Scottish Airways =

Scottish regional airline (1937–1947)

- Founded: 12 August 1937
- Commenced operations: 12 August 1937
- Ceased operations: 31 January 1947
- Operating bases: Glasgow Renfrew Airport, Inverness Longman Airport
- Destinations: Northern and Western Isles of Scotland
- Parent company: Whitehall Securities Corporation
- Headquarters: Renfrew Airport
- Key people: Clive Pearson; George Nicholson; Ted Fresson

Scottish Airways Ltd. was an airline serving most of Scotland, especially the Highlands and Islands. It was active from 1937 until 1947, when it merged scheduled services into British European Airways.

== History ==
=== Foundation ===
The company was established on 12 August 1937 by a group of investors including Whitehall Securities Corporation, LMS Railway and Western Isles Airways. Whitehall Securities was a wealthy, powerful investment enterprise which had already set up British Airways Ltd which operated mainly in England. Whitehall was run by Clive Pearson, who was now performing a similar feat in Scotland.

LMS Railway wanted to invest in transport to the Scottish islands where rail couldn't reach. Railway Air Services (RAS) was the rail industry's response to the airlines with whom they were already competing (to the extent of banning other airlines' ticket sales through their agents). LMS was already a partner in RAS and saw Scottish Airways as an extension of their operation rather than competition.

Western Isles Airways (WIA) was an investment tool, 50% owned by David MacBrayne ferry company, and 50% owned by Whitehall Securities, It was set up because the Ministry of Transport required MacBraynes to keep separate accounts for its aviation interests. MacBrayne, which was 50% owned by LMS already, could see air travel as a complement to their existing operations.

Scottish Airways consisted of two airlines already owned by Whitehall: Highland Airways and Northern & Scottish Airways (N&SA). At the time of the formation of Scottish Airways, N&SA had a change of name, becoming Northern Airways. The precise details of ownership of Scottish Airways were Northern Airways 31.9%, Highland Airways 18.1%, LMS 40%, and WIA 10%. This effectively meant that Whitehall Securities held a 55% share of Scottish Airways, with LMS controlling 45%.

Highland Airways was run by its founder, Ted Fresson and was based in Inverness, specialising in services to the Northern Isles of Orkney and Shetland. Likewise, N&SA was run by its founder, George Nichols, but was based at Renfrew Airport, Glasgow, specialising in serving the Western Isles. At the start, each airline retained its own identity, their bosses remained in place, and their roles and responsibilities were little changed. The N&SA timetable for October 1937 shows the company name as "Northern and Scottish Airways (Northern Airways Limited)".

The coverage of Scotland was not complete, however, largely because of the intransigence of Eric Gandar Dower, the founder of what was now Allied Airways (Gandar Dower), based at the airport he founded and owned; Dyce at Aberdeen. He was operating routes to the Northern Isles in competition with Fresson. He refused to allow competing airlines access to his airport, and rejected any thoughts of co-operation with or investment by anyone else, a situation that endured until all private airlines were nationalised after World War II.

=== Pre-war operations ===
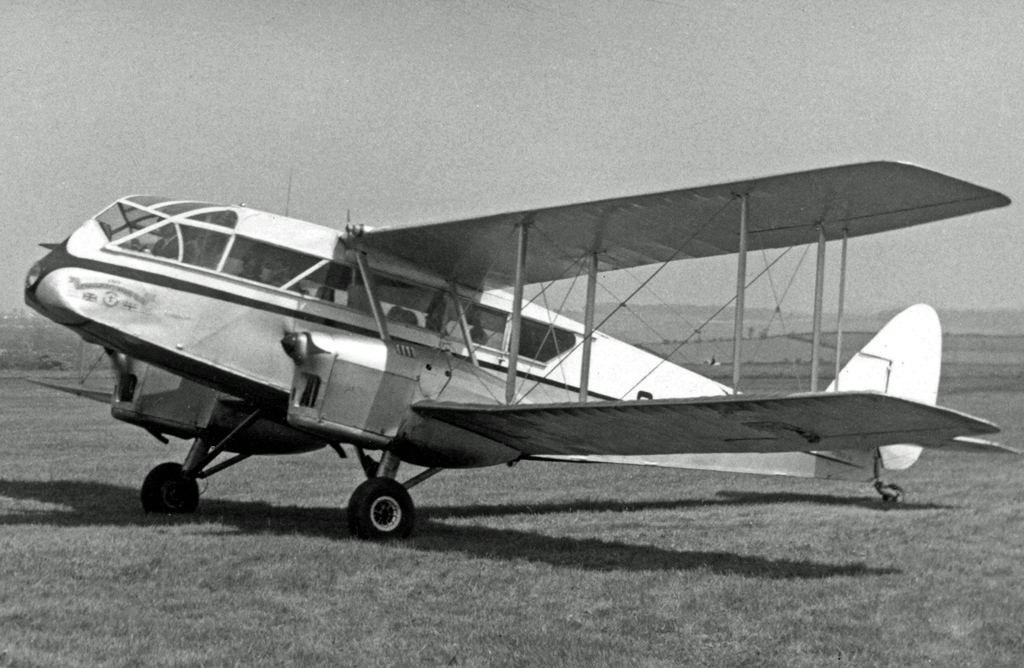
Long-serving DH.84 Dragon G-ACIT in 1956. Now at the Science Museum

At first the operations of the two divisions went on much as before the takeover. Advantages which the new airline with its railway and ferry investors promoted were that tickets were now available from all British railway stations as well as the usual travel agents, and heavy luggage could be sent in advance by rail and ferry. Of particular note was “inter-availability”; tickets could be exchanged between air, rail or MacBrayne ferries (out by air, return first class by steamship and rail, or out by surface, return by air for a supplement).

On 3 May 1938 N&SA opened a new route, flown by chief pilot David Barclay in their new Dragon Rapide G-AFEY, from Renfrew Airport via Perth, Inverness and Kirkwall (Orkney) to Sumburgh (Shetland). Another intermediate stop, at Wick, was soon added.

In 1938 the Air Transport Licensing Authority (ATLA) had been established by the government to license scheduled airline services and civil airports, as part of the effort to improve the British aviation industry spurred by the Maybury Committee report of 1936. Other areas of activity were to improve navigation, air traffic control and radio aids, weather reporting, pilot training and certification, and airport facilities. In order to rationalise airline routes to provide good service without needless, wasteful and often damaging competition, many small airlines closed or merged, and larger, better financed operations thrived. Scottish Airways was performing valuable services for the Highlands and Islands, and its routes were largely unaffected, but one decision the ATLA took, in February 1939, was to stop their competition on routes to Aberdeen, leaving that city's routes to Eric Gandar Dower's Allied Airways. (Note: Because Gandar Dower had banned him from Dyce Airport, Fresson had set up his own new airfield at Kintore, quite a long way past Dyce from the city centre.) As a condition of licence approval, airlines had to commit to providing their aircraft for government use in the event of national emergency.

Western Isles Airways was granted the ATLA licences for the routes from Glasgow to the Inner and Outer Hebrides, but those were actually operated by N&SA.

The first regular airmail service between Kirkwall and North Ronaldsay was performed by Ted Fresson on 31 July 1939 in Dragon G-ACIT.

In the summer of 1939 Scottish Airways started an Orkney to London route taking just six hours. Leaving Kirkwall at 6:25am, the flight would connect with North Eastern Airways at Perth, flying in their Airspeed Envoys to Edinburgh, Newcastle and London (Croydon). The service only lasted a few months before war caused its cancellation.

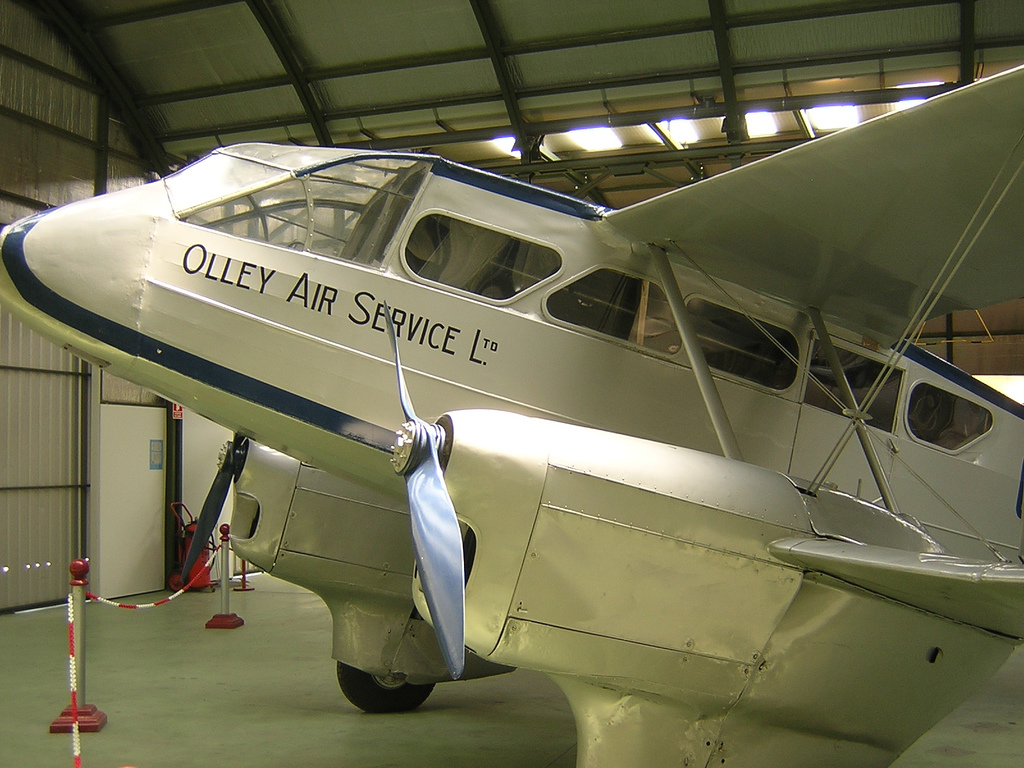
De Havilland Dragon Rapide DH.89 G-ACYR, used by Olley Air Service before being used by Scottish. Now static in Madrid

==== Routes, 1938 ====
From timetable dated May 1938

- Glasgow — Campbeltown (Kintyre) — Islay (Glenegedale) (twice daily except Sunday)
- Glasgow — Islay (Monday, Friday, Saturday)
- Glasgow — Tiree (The Reef) (Monday, Wednesday, Friday)
- Glasgow — Barra (Northbay) — South Uist (Askernish) — Benbecula (Balivanich) — Tiree — North Uist (Sollas) (daily except Sunday)
- Glasgow — Perth — Inverness (Longman) — Wick (Hillhead) — Kirkwall (Wideford) — Lerwick (Sumburgh) (daily except Sunday)
- Aberdeen (Kintore) — Inverness — Wick — Kirkwall — Lerwick (daily except Sunday)
- Isle of Man (Derbyhaven/Ronaldsway) — Glasgow (operated by Isle of Man Air Services Ltd) (Note: LMS Railway had a stake in IoMAS.) (thrice daily)

==== Routes, 1939 ====
ATLA licensed routes, February 1939

- Kirkwall — Sanday — Stronsay — Westray — Longhope — North Ronaldsay
- Kirkwall — Wick
- Inverness — Wick — Thurso — Kirkwall
- Kirkwall — Shetland
- Thurso — Longhope — Kirkwall

=== World War II ===
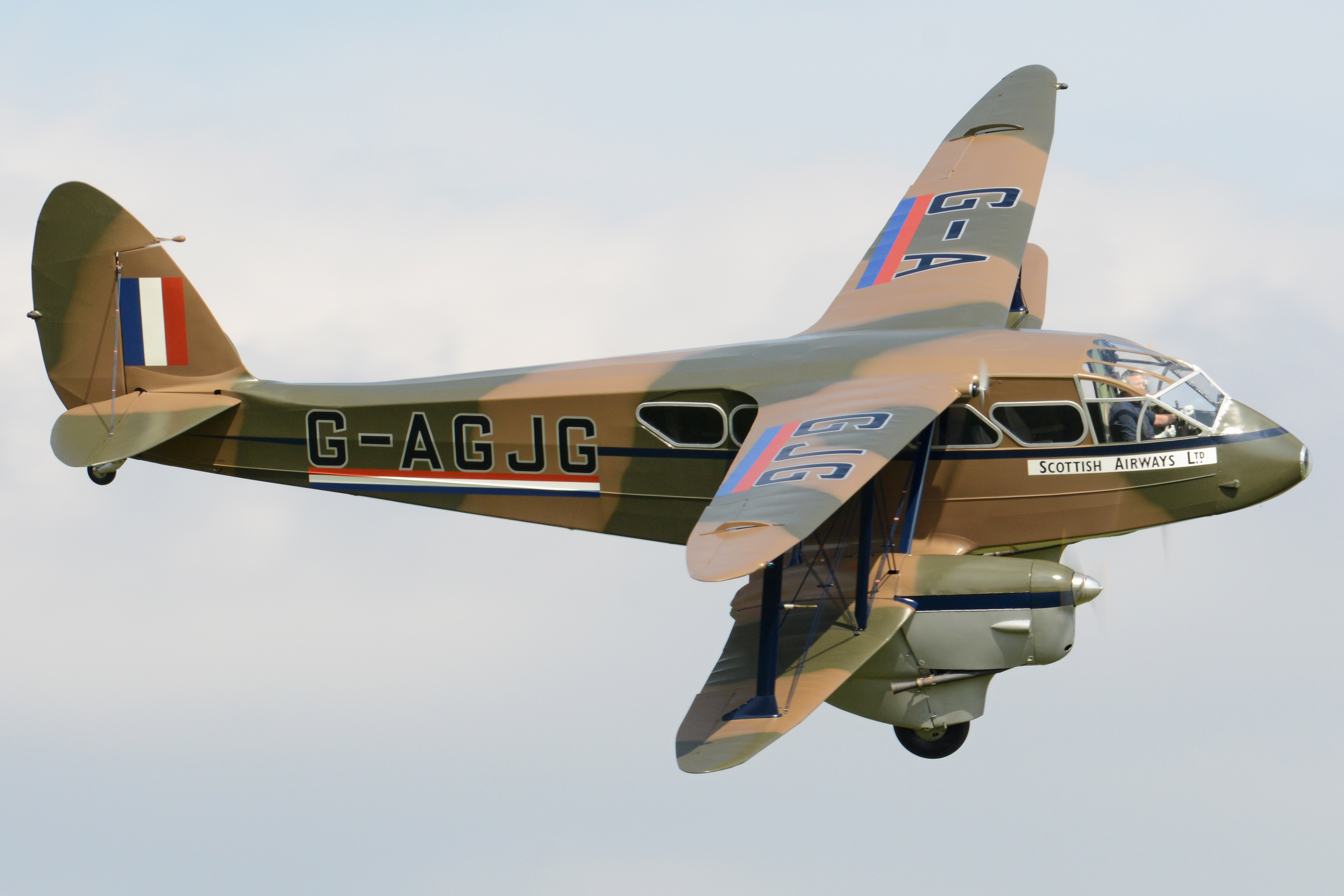
De Havilland Dominie DH.89 G-AGJG restored to the Scottish Airways wartime camouflage colors

On 29 August 1939, the ATLA was replaced by a new department of the Air Ministry, National Air Communications (NAC), based at Whitchurch. Almost all flyable civil aircraft were flown to gathering points, Scottish Airways' point being Renfrew. The NAC directed all civil operations as required, both to maintain essential services and to assist the army in carrying freight, especially blood supplies, particularly to France. Camouflage was applied to many NAC aircraft, and registrations were underlined with red, white and blue stripes, with RAF-style fin flashes and roundels on the wings. Many aircraft had their passenger windows "blacked-out" with white paint so that occupants couldn't see things outside that they shouldn't – carrying cameras was strictly forbidden. Priority on all flights was given to military personnel. On 27 March 1940, the RAF started to take over the direct operation of non-scheduled civil flying, starting the process of impressment.

NAC found that it was having to subsidise the airlines under its control, so it requisitioned the aircraft of those companies it didn't deem to be essential, effectively closing them down, although those with substantial engineering departments became Civilian Repair Units (CRU) organised by the Civilian Repair Organisation. Scottish Airways was selected as a CRU at Renfrew. The airlines that were left all had close associations with rail companies (with the notable exception of Gandar Dower's Allied Airways), whose influence was noted by Member of Parliament Robert Perkins, who also represented the Air Line Pilots Association.

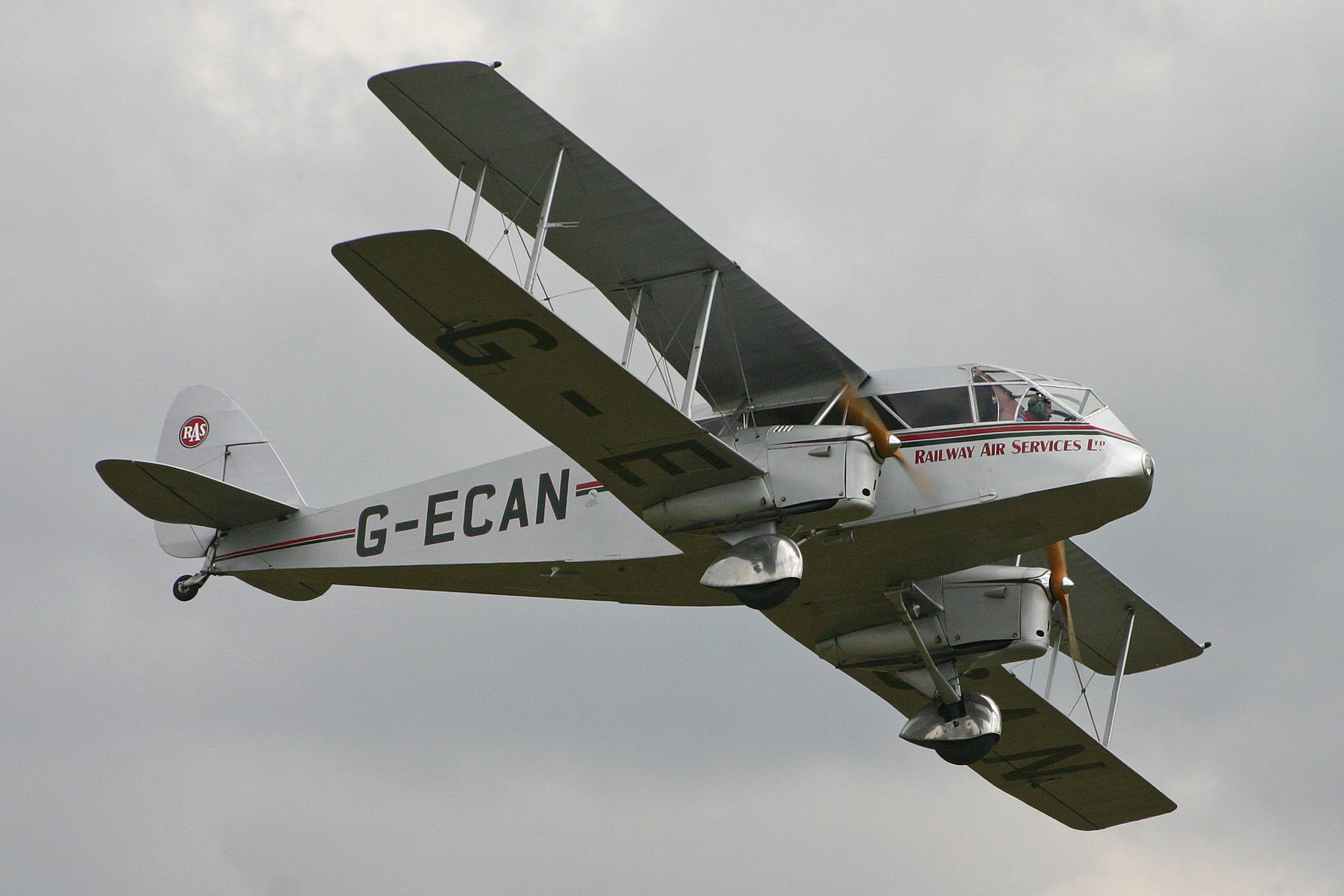
De Havilland Dragon DH.84 G-ECAN in Railway Air Services markings (but never flew with them)

NAC had access to the following Scottish Airways aircraft. See the Fleet list below for further details.

- De Havilland Dragon: G-ACIT, G-ACNG, G-ADCT
- De Havilland Dragon Rapide: G-ADAJ, G-AEWL, G-AFEY, G-AFOI, G-AFRK
- Spartan Cruiser II: G-ACSM, G-ACYL, G-ACZM
- Spartan Cruiser III: G-ADEL.

Scottish Airways was initially permitted to fly three routes: Renfrew — Rothesay — Cock-of-Arran — Campbeltown — Bowmore, Inverness — Lybster, and Wick — Kirkwall; the latter two could be modified at the wishes of RAF Coastal Command.

On 3 September 1939 inter-island services were suspended, resumed in November and finished again on 27 April 1940, and the island airfields were blocked by stone cairns. Stromness and Thurso airfields were taken over by the military and rendered permanently unusable.

In the Orkneys, Ted Fresson was left with one Rapide, G-ADAJ, for doing much-needed charter flights, but soon the need for a regular service was recognised, and Scottish Airways restarted an Inverness — Kirkwall — Sumburgh route. Longman Airfield at Inverness was available to Scottish Airways despite the fact that it had been requisitioned for military use. The airline stopped serving Wick in February 1941 because it was unsuitable, (Note: Wick was unsuitable because at first it was a "sea of mud", but also in 1941-2 its proximity to occupied Norway meant that it came under intense German bombing, especially since four huge hangars were built there, making it an easy target.) but it became available after RAF Coastal Command laid tarmac runways there. On 18 March 1940 Scottish Airways' Rapide G-AFEY crashed into a stone wall at Wideford (Kirkwall), and both Scottish Airways and Allied Airways were allowed to use RNAS Hatston, but it appears that at this stage they didn't. In late 1941 one of Allied's Rapides, G-ACZF, crashed, also hitting a stone wall at Wideford. This time they did move, first to RAF Skeabrae, much further from Kirkwall, and on 10 December 1941 to RAF Grimsetter, much closer to Kirkwall and the site of the present Kirkwall Airport.

With the surrender of France on 22 June 1940, once all their surviving aircraft had returned, on 27 June NAC was replaced by a new organisation, the Associated Airways Joint Committee (AAJC). Based at Liverpool's Speke Airport, it took control of most of the domestic private air companies. Scottish Airways joined it and its aircraft became part of the fleet. Some were impressed for use by the armed forces, and others were used to run the services that the AAJC deemed necessary. During and after the war the AAJC provided further aircraft, De Havilland Dominies, which were military versions of the Dragon Rapide, with improved engines.

Before the war, Ted Fresson had tried tirelessly to get an airfield built at Stornoway, the largest town in the Hebrides, on the island of Lewis and Harris. Finally he convinced the council, and the airfield was completed in August 1939 at Melbost, just outside the town, on a golf course where Fresson had landed several times on air ambulance missions. The outbreak of war had prevented its use, but the NAC granted permission, and the Southern Division of Scottish Airways extended its Hebrides route there in May 1940. Eventually, after RAF Coastal Command had laid runways there, the Northern Division was also given permission, and direct flights from Inverness started on 24 May 1944. This was a particularly difficult route, especially in winter, as it crossed the highlands, and gales, ice and low clouds were often encountered. An alternative route around the north-west tip of Scotland was possible, but was long and arduous, especially in high winds.

Along with Allied Airways, Scottish Airways was kept extremely busy during the war, with thousands of passengers carried, including civilians, Norwegian refugees, and military personnel, plus freight, mail and newspapers. Air ambulance and search operations for survivors from torpedoed ships were also undertaken. All of this was happening with the constant threat of encountering enemy aircraft.

To demonstrate the importance of their services, between 1940 and 1945 Scottish Airways and Allied Airways together flew 41% of all domestic airline passengers carried in Britain, and 64% of the mail and freight.

==== Routes, 1941 ====
From timetable dated May 1941. "Facility of inter-availability of tickets with rail and/or steamer still applies."

- Inverness — Kirkwall (twice daily except Sunday)
- Inverness — Kirkwall — Shetland (daily except Sunday)
- Glasgow — Campbeltown — Islay (daily except Sunday)
- Glasgow — Tiree — Barra (by request, weather & tide permitting) — Benbecula — North Uist — Stornoway (daily except Sunday)

The timetable also offered routes via Liverpool and Glasgow to Belfast operated by Railway Air Services.

==== Routes, early 1945 ====
Routes in early or mid 1945 (precise date not stated)

===== Northern Division =====
- Inverness — Kirkwall (twice daily except Sunday)
- Inverness — Kirkwall — Lerwick (daily except Sunday)
- Inverness — Stornoway (thrice weekly)

===== Southern Division =====
Operated on behalf of Western Isles Airways Ltd.

- Glasgow — Campbeltown — Islay (twice daily except Sunday)
- Glasgow — Tiree — Benbecula — North Uist — Stornoway (daily except Sunday)

=== Post-war operations ===
After the end of World War II, in the short term little change occurred. Some routes were opened up, still under the direction of the AAJC, but the government was now intent on nationalising all scheduled airlines in Britain. The AAJC was replaced by a new corporation to run domestic and European routes, British European Airways (BEA), while British Overseas Airways Corporation (BOAC) would serve the rest of the world apart from the Caribbean and South America, which would be the preserve of British South American Airways (BSAA). The chairman of BEA was Brigadier general Sir Harold Hartley, who was well versed in civil aviation; he had been involved with the aviation activities of LMS Railway, was chairman of RAS, and also chaired the AAJC before becoming a director of BOAC. His deputy was Air Commodore Whitney Straight who also had a great deal of experience in civil airlines and airports, having founded the Straight Corporation and developed Western Airways during the 1930s and had a distinguished military career during the war.

BEA's UK division started work at Liverpool Speke airport, the old home of the AAJC, on 1 August 1946, and the Continental Division was based at Northolt Aerodrome. Attention centred on the Continental division, and the UK Division was in no position to run its own operations yet, so it allowed the existing airlines to operate on its behalf, starting on 2 August, in the hope that BEA would take over in the following February. So it was that the airlines continued to operate with their own aircraft, routes and staff, at least in the short term, while awaiting their fate.

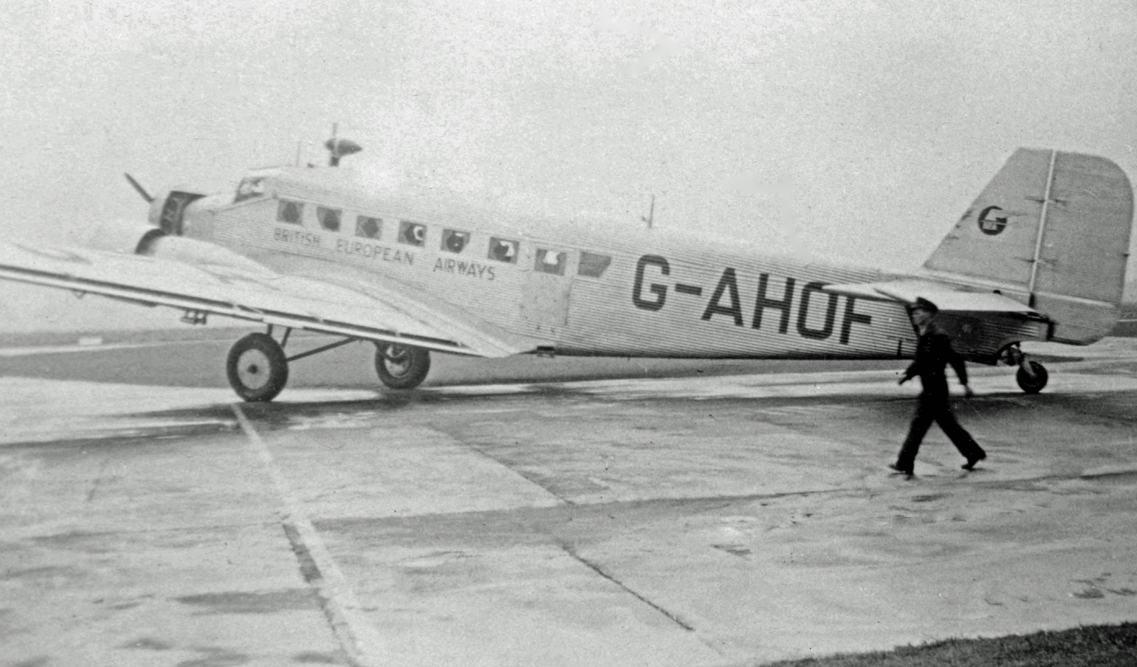
German-manufactured Junkers Ju 52/3m G-AHOF of BEA

In 1945 Kirkwall's civil airport was again RAF Hatston, which, at Ted Fresson's advice, had been equipped with tarmac runways – the first in Britain. On 22 August 1946 Ted Fresson came to Hatston in Douglas DC-3 G-AGZA on loan from RAS which made some trial landings and gave a demonstration flight to some local people. Scottish Airways did employ DC-3 Dakotas in 1946 for a Prestwick — Northolt route under a contract for BEA, but sub-contracted operations to RAS. (Note: Coincidentally it was G-AGZA that was involved in a notorious 'rooftop landing' crash at Ruislip while performing this service later that year.)

Scottish Airways acquired two Junkers Ju 52 trimotors in 1946. They were from a batch of eleven bought by RAS after the war. They were painted in BEA livery as they were to be operated by RAS on contract to BEA. While they were rugged and comfortable (new specially designed seats had been fitted by Shorts during their conversion to civil use), they had been poorly built during the war and engine fumes would leak into the cockpit. Also, spares, particularly tyres and exhaust parts were difficult to source, and starting the engines required ground power units which were not available at most of the airfields used by the airline. They were not used much.

==== Routes, late 1945 ====
From timetable dated 8 October 1945 There is no mention of ticket inter-availability.

- Inverness — Kirkwall (twice daily except Sundays)
- Inverness — Kirkwall — Shetland (daily except Sundays)
- Inverness — Stornoway (Mondays, Wednesdays and Fridays)
- Glasgow — Campbeltown (daily except Sundays)
- Glasgow — Islay (daily except Sundays)
- Glasgow — Tiree — Stornoway (Mondays, Wednesdays and Fridays, including Benbecula southbound only)
- Glasgow — Stornoway (Mondays, Wednesdays and Fridays)
- Glasgow — Tiree — Benbecula — Stornoway (Tuesdays, Thursdays and Saturdays)
- Glasgow — London (Croydon) (daily except Sundays, in association with Railway Air Services)
- Glasgow — Belfast (Nutts Corner) (daily except Sundays, in association with Railway Air Services)

==== Routes, 1946 ====
Routes operated by Scottish Airways on behalf of BEA

- Glasgow — Stornoway (daily except Sunday)
- Glasgow — Tiree — Barra — Benbecula (daily except Sunday)
- Glasgow — Campbeltown (daily except Sunday)
- Glasgow — Campbeltown – Islay (daily except Sunday)
- Glasgow — Belfast (thrice daily)
- Glasgow — Orkney – Shetland (daily except Sunday)
- Aberdeen — Inverness (four times a week)
- Aberdeen — Inverness – Stornoway (three times a week)
- Inverness — Wick — Orkney (twice daily)
- Wick — Orkney (on demand)

=== Demise ===
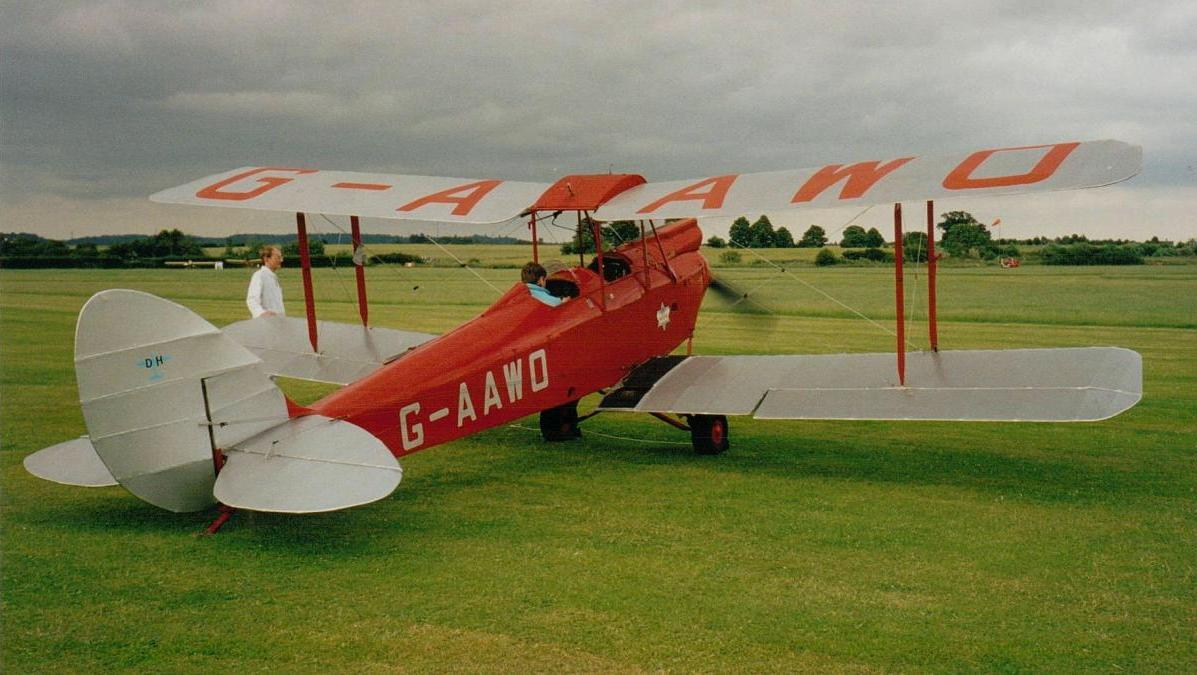
De Havilland DH6.0G Gipsy Moth G-AAWO, with which Ted Fresson arrived and departed

On 1 February 1947 Scottish Airways was nationalised and became part of BEA. The two divisional managers still nominally retained their positions, but became increasingly marginalised. Fresson argued that BEA should set up a separate Scottish Division, and this was agreed, but he realised that it had been pointless when more of BEA's completely unsuitable Junkers Ju 52s were imposed as Rapide replacements. The Division was soon merged with the English division again, with Fresson appointed BEA's manager for the Highlands and Islands. (The Scottish Division was re-established in 1949).

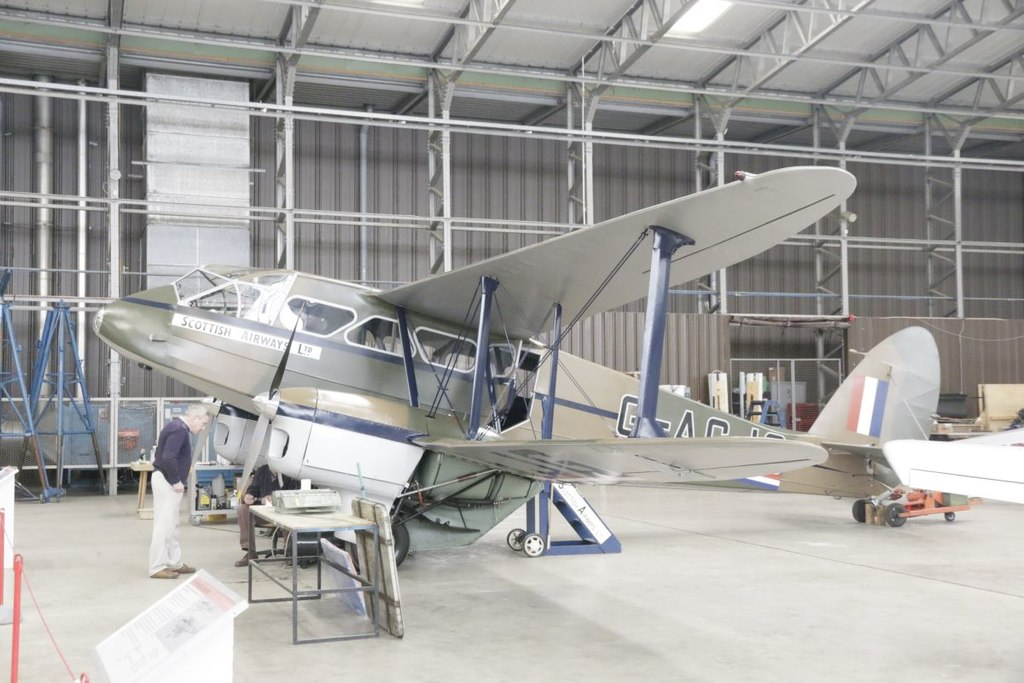

On 11 February 1948 Fresson was flying a charter flight in Dragon G-ACIT, carrying three inspectors from the Ministry of Civil Aviation. At Westray he was contacted with an urgent request to transport a badly injured child from Stronsay to hospital in Kirkwall, which he promptly did. On hearing about this, Fresson's senior management gave him a severe reprimand for not seeking prior permission, and within a fortnight he was made redundant, leaving on 31 March. The only compensation he received for the nationalisation of his airline was the gift of the De Havilland Gipsy Moth G-AAWO, which he had brought to the organisation in the first place.

== Fleet list ==
All aircraft operated by Scottish Airways 1937–1947. (Note: Several sources state that Scottish Airways operated Douglas DC-3s. This is a result of confusion with Scottish Airlines of Prestwick who did operate around thirteen of the type. Scottish Airways did not operate the DC-3 or any of its variants. They were used by Railway Air Services in 1946 on a subcontract to Scottish Airways, retaining the RAS livery.)

Aircraft type	Registration	From	To	Fate	Division	Notes
De Havilland DH.60G; Gipsy Moth	G-AAWO	12 August 1937	31 January 1947	Xferred	Northern	Ex Highland, brought by Fresson from his original company North British Aviation Co Ltd. Stored at Inverness during WWII. To BEA, gifted to Fresson on retirement July 1947. Still active in 2025.
DH.84 Dragon 1	G-ACIT	12 August 1937	31 January 1947	Xferred	Northern	Ex Highland. To BEA. Survives at the Science Museum at Wroughton
Dragon 2	G-ACMO	12 August 1937	March 1938	Sold	Southern	The first Dragon 2 produced. Ex N&SA. To Australia as VH-AEA. Damaged New Guinea 11 March 1942
Dragon 2	G-ACNG	12 August 1937	19 April 1940	Crashed	Southern	Ex N&SA and BAL. Crashed RNAS Hatston, Kirkwall. No fatalities among the nine occupants. Written off
Dragon 2	G-ACOR	12 August 1937	February 1938	Sold	Southern	Ex N&SA. To Australia as VH-AEA. Damaged New Guinea 11 March 1942
Dragon 2	G-ADCT	12 August 1937	14 December 1939	Crashed	Northern	Ex Highland. Crashed on approach to Longman, Inverness on flight from Renfrew. No injuries among the pilot and seven passengers. Written off
DH.89A Dragon Rapide	G-ACPP	22 February 1941	16 September 1942	Returned	Southern	Ex Great Western & Southern Airlines/AAJC. Returned to AAJC. Later sold to Canada as CF-PTK, now at Reynolds-Alberta Museum, Canada. The world's oldest remaining Rapide
Rapide	G-ACYR	4 March 1941	25 April 1942	Returned	Southern	Ex Olley Air Service/AAJC. Returned to AAJC. At Museo del Air, Cuatro Vientos Airport, Madrid as of 2020 in Olley markings (was General Franco’s transport in 1936)
Rapide	G-ADAJ	12 August 1937	31 January 1947	Xferred	Northern	Ex Highland. To BEA. Sold, crashed as F-BAHY in what is now Laos 20 August 1954
Rapide	G-AEOV	27 July 1939	10 January 1940	Impressed	Southern	Ex Personal Airways Ltd. Impressed as W6456. Wrecked Hendon in 1942
Rapide	G-AEPE	12 July 1940	24 July 1940	Impressed	Unknown	Ex RAF. Impressed as BD143, wrecked in forced landing in Ayrshire 1942
Rapide	G-AERN	1 July 1940	4 January 1944	Returned	Northern	Ex AAJC. Returned to AAJC, later sold abroad as EC-AKO. At Museo del Air, Cuatro Vientos, Madrid as 40-1 as of 2020
Rapide	G-AERZ	15 November 1940	26 August 1943	Returned	Southern	Ex AAJC. Returned to AAJC for RAS. Crashed County Down 1946
Rapide	G-AEWL	12 August 1937	31 January 1947	Xferred	Northern	Ex Highland. To BEA. Overran on landing at Wideford 8 July 1938 and struck a ditch – repaired. Crashed in France as F-OATT 1962
Rapide	G-AFEY	15 April 1938	18 March 1940	Crashed	Southern	Delivered new. Hit high ground on approach, 5 miles from Wideford on flight from Renfrew. All six occupants were injured. Written off
Rapide	G-AFFF	26 May 1939	27 September 1946	Crashed	Southern	Ex RAS (never registered to Scottish Airways). Crashed into high ground near Milngavie on Islay–Glasgow flight. Seven killed including Captain F Stephens
Rapide	G-AFOI	28 August 1939	31 January 1947	Xferred	Southern	Delivered new. To BEA. Operated in France from September 1939 to June 1940. Scrapped at Luton around 1959
Rapide	G-AFRK	12 July 1939	31 January 1947	Xferred	Southern	Ex IoMAS. Operated in France from September 1939 to June 1940. To BEA, scrapped at Christchurch Airfield around 1960
DH.89B Dominie	G-AGDG	3 November 1941	31 January 1947	Xferred	Unknown	Ex RAF X7387. To BEA. Sold abroad and destroyed as F-BAHX in Vietnam in 1953
Dominie	G-AGDH	13 October 1941	25 November 1941	Wrecked	Unknown	Ex RAF X7388. Damaged in gale at Stornoway while parked. No injuries
Dominie	G-AGED	25 April 1942	2 February 1943	Crashed	Southern	Ex X7504 but delivered new to AAJC, Speke to replace G-ACYR. Control lost and hit fence on take-off at Renfrew. Slight injuries to the two crew and four passengers. Written off
Dominie	G-AGEE	5 February 1943	7 July 1943	Returned	Southern	Ex X7505 but delivered new to AAJC, then Great Western & Southern Air Lines. Replacement for G-AGED. Returned to AAJC before transfer to BEA. Scrapped in Iceland as TF-KAA in 1966
Dominie	G-AGIC	28 May 1943	31 January 1947	Xferred	Northern	Ex RAF X7349. To BEA. Sold abroad, crashed in France as F-BAHZ 24 February 1951
Dominie	G-AGIF	19 July 1943	31 January 1947	Xferred	Southern	Ex RAF X7336. To BEA. Sold, withdrawn from use October 1950 at Newtownards Airport
Dominie	G-AGJF	13 October 1943	31 January 1947	Xferred	Southern	Ex RAF X7326. To BEA. Crashed on take-off from Barra 6 August 1947
Dominie	G-AGJG	7 January 1944	31 January 1947	Xferred	Northern	Ex RAF X7344. To BEA. Swung and tipped on nose Stornoway 13 May 47, repaired. Still flying in WWII Scottish Airways camouflage scheme in 2020
Dominie	G-AGLE	14 March 1945	31 January 1947	Xferred	Southern	Ex RAF NR685, RAS. To BEA. Sold, withdrawn from use 1952
Dominie	G-AGLP	27 February 1945	31 January 1947	Xferred	Southern	Ex RAF NR681, AAJC. Loaned to Jersey Airways, became first civil plane to land in Channel Islands after liberation, loaned to IoMAS. To BEA. Sold, withdrawn from use 1952
Dominie	G-AGLR	2 May 1945	31 January 1947	Xferred	Southern	Ex RAF NR682, AAJC. To BEA. Sold. Destroyed by fire on forced landing near Coventry 1956
Dominie	G-AGOJ	17 October 1945	31 January 1947	Xferred	Southern	Ex RAF NR774, IoMAS. To BEA. Sold. Crashed at Lympne 1 May 1961
Dominie	G-AGUR	12 January 1946	31 January 1947	Xferred	Southern	Ex RAF NR846. To BEA. Sold, crashed on landing at Rhein-Main Airport, Germany on 2 August 1954
Dominie	G-AHGI	9 September 1946	31 January 1947	Xferred	Southern	Ex RAF RL953, AAJC, RAS. To BEA. Sold, Crashed in Laos as F-LAAF 1958
Dominie	G-AHLL	15 August 1946	31 January 1947	Xferred	Southern	Ex RAF X7416. To BEA. Crashed on landing at St Just, Cornwall 28 July 1959
Dominie	G-AHLM	23 October 1946	31 January 1947	Xferred	Southern	Ex RAF HG723. To BEA. Sold, crashed on take-off and burned at St Mary's, Isles of Scilly 20 July 1963
Dominie	G-AHLN	22 November 1946	31 January 1947	Xferred	Northern	Ex RAF NF883. To BEA. Sold, crashed at Toussus, France as F-BGOQ 6 July 1953
Dominie	G-AIHN	13 November 1946	31 January 1947	Xferred	Southern	Ex RAF X7325. To BEA. Later sold abroad, crashed South Africa 1963 as ZS-DJT
Junkers Ju 52/3m	G-AHOD	21 May 1946	31 January 1947	Xferred	Unknown	Ex RAF VN740, AAJC. To BEA – used for spares
Ju 52	G-AHOK	21 May 1946	26 January 1947	Crashed	Southern	Ex RAF VN742, AAJC. Damaged on landing at Renfrew and scrapped at Prestwick
Spartan Cruiser II	G-ACSM	12 August 1937	2 April 1940	Impressed	Southern	Ex N&SA. Impressed as X9433 scrapped 4 July 1940, decayed
Cruiser II	G-ACYL	12 August 1937	2 April 1940	Impressed	Southern	Ex N&SA (not registered to Scottish Airways). Impressed as X9431. Struck off charge November 1941, decayed
Cruiser II	G-ACZM	12 August 1937	9 September 1940	Withdrawn	Southern	Ex N&SA. Withdrawn from use, scrapped April 1942
Cruiser III	G-ACYK	12 August 1937	14 January 1938	Crashed	Southern	Ex N&SA (not registered to Scottish Airways). Crashed at Largs 14 January 1938, crew unhurt. Fuselage retrieved by RAF helicopter 25 July 1973, displayed at the National Museum of Flight in Scotland; the only remains of a Cruiser existing in 2020
Cruiser III	G-ADEL	12 August 1937	2 April 1940	Impressed	Southern	Ex N&SA. Impressed as X9432 Struck off charge 26 July 1940, decayed

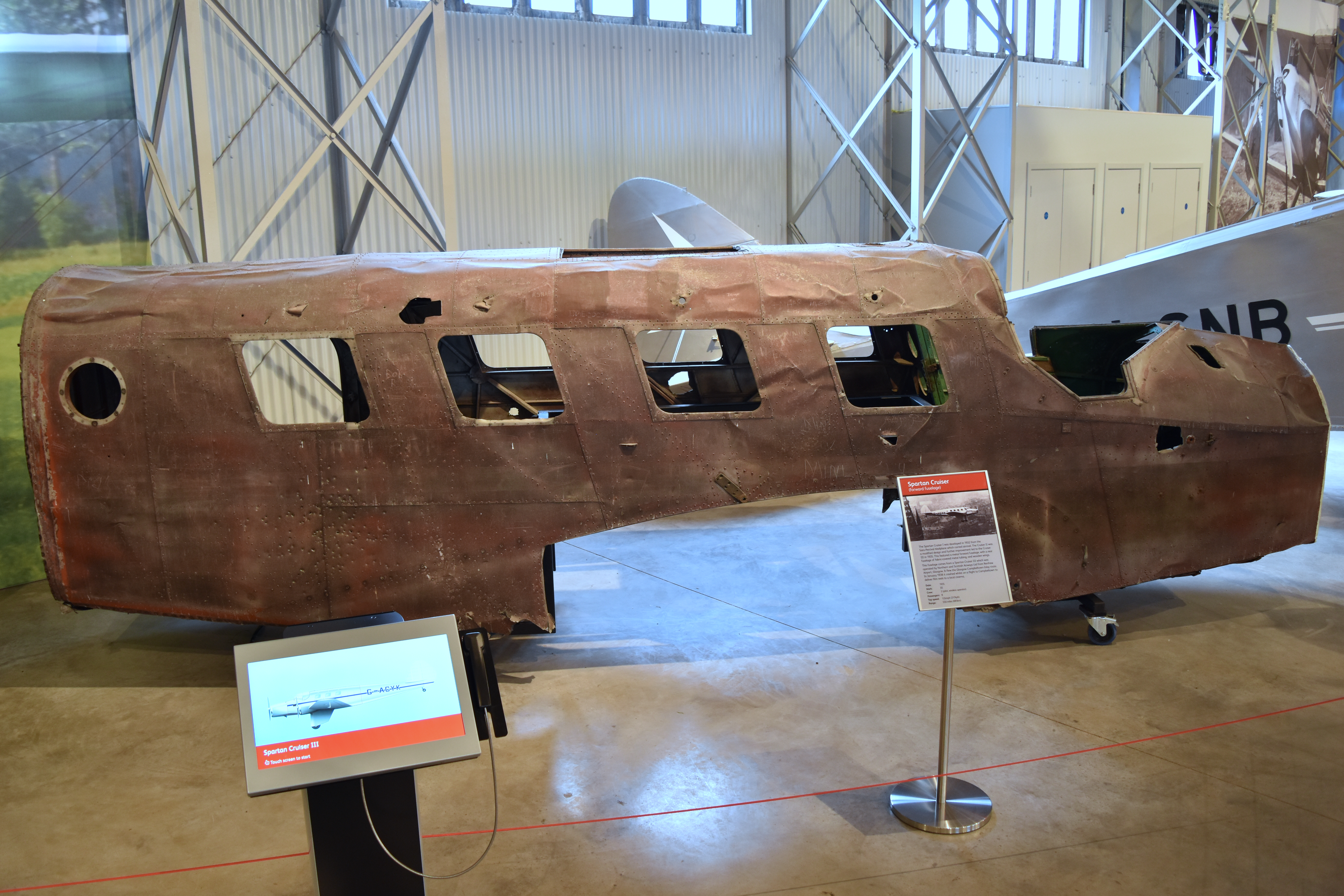
The fuselage of Spartan Cruiser G-ACYK at the National Museum of Flight

It is likely that further Dominies were loaned from the military during the war without taking civil registrations. X7453, HG725 and NF881 in October 1944 have been reported.

Pre-war livery was probably overall silver with black lettering and trim. Post-war the lettering, trim and struts were painted cobalt blue. (Note: The post-war livery was designed by aviation author and consultant John Stroud, and the first aircraft to receive it was probably Rapide G-AFRK.)

== Accidents and incidents ==
The following aircraft were involved in accidents or incidents while with Scottish Airways: Dragon: G-ACNG, G-ADCT. Rapide: G-AEWL, G-AFEY, G-AFFF, Dominie: G-AGDH, G-AGED, G-AGJG, Junkers: G-AHOK, Cruiser: G-ACYK. See Fleet list above for details.

== See also ==
- Aviation in the United Kingdom
- List of defunct airlines of the United Kingdom
- History of British Airways

== Bibliography ==
- Buttler, Phil (1994). War Prizes. Leicester, UK: Midland Counties Publications. ISBN 0-904597-86-5.
- Calderwood, Roy (1999). Times subject to Tides: The Story of Barra Airport. Erskine, Scotland: Kea Publishing. ISBN 0-9518958-3-4.
- Davies, R. E. G. (2005). British Airways: An airline and its aircraft Volume 1: 1919 - 1939. McLean, Virginia, USA: Paladwr Press. ISBN 1-888962-24-0.
- Lo Bao, Phil (1989). An Illustrated History of British European Airways. Feltham, Middlesex, UK: Browcom Group PLC. ISBN 0-946141-398.
- Lo Bao, Phil; Hutchison, Iain (2002). BEAline to the Islands. Erskine, Scotland: Kea Publishing. p. 99. ISBN 0951895842.
- Moss, Peter W. (1962). Impressments Log Volume 1. Air-Britain.
- Moss, Peter W. (1964). Impressments Log Volume III. Air-Britain.
- Warner, Guy (2005). Orkney by Air. Erskine, Scotland: kea publishing. ISBN 0951895877.
