= National Air Communications =

British directorate of civil aviation at the start of WWII

National Air Communications was a British government organisation that directed civilian flying operations from the outbreak of World War II until April 1940.

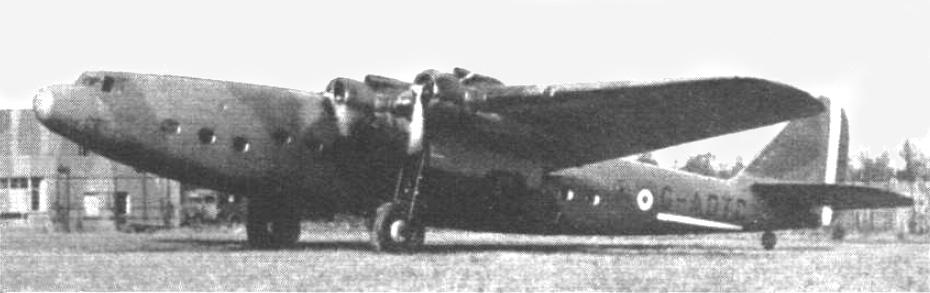
AW.27 Ensign G-ADTC in typical 1940 NAC markings

== Pre-war preparations ==
During the 1930s, and up to 1938, the British government progressively implemented the recommendations of the Maybury Committee Report and related later reports, by organising and installing air traffic control, weather reporting, navigation and radio systems for civilian aviation. In 1938, the Air Transport Licensing Authority (ATLA) was set up by the Air Navigation (Licensing of Public Transport) Order 1938, under the Air Navigation Act 1936 (s.5). Chaired by Trustam Eve, the ATLA issued provisional licences to airports and to air transport companies operating regular services, throughout 1938 and 1939. Licensing, and some subsidising of services, was conditional on agreements that commercial aircraft fleets would be made available to the government in a national emergency. In parallel, the Civil Air Guard scheme of 1938 provided subsidised pilot training in return for future military call-up commitments. At that time, the Air Ministry, headed by Secretary of State for Air, Sir Kingsley Wood, was responsible for both military and civil aviation, and the Director-General of Civil Aviation was Sir Francis Shelmerdine.

== Activation and dispersal ==
On 29 August 1939, prior to the outbreak of war on 1 September 1939, the British government started to implement the Air Navigation (Restriction in Time of War) Order 1939. That ordered military takeover of most civilian airfields in the UK, cessation of all private flying without individual flight permits, and other emergency measures. It was administered by a statutory department of the Air Ministry titled National Air Communications (NAC). On 31 August 1939, all flights to mainland Europe were briefly suspended, later reinstated under the organisation of NAC. By 1 September 1939, most of the aircraft and facilities of British Airways Ltd (BAL) were transferred from Heston Airport to Bristol (Whitchurch) Airport, and to Exeter Airport. Similarly, landplanes of Imperial Airways were transferred from Croydon Airport to Whitchurch, while others were temporarily dispersed to Coventry (Baginton) Airport and Exeter Airport. Imperial Airways' flying boats were transferred from Southampton marine aerodrome to Poole Harbour, Dorset. All the usable fleets of private air transport companies were dispersed:

- Air Commerce Ltd, from Croydon Airport to Ronaldsway Airport, Isle of Man.
- Air Dispatch Ltd, from Croydon Airport to RAF Pengam Moors Aerodrome, Cardiff.
- Air Taxis Ltd, from Croydon Airport to Barton Aerodrome, Manchester
- Allied Airways (Gandar Dower) Ltd, at Aberdeen (Dyce) Airport.
- Birkett Air Service Ltd, from Heston Airport to Liverpool (Speke) Airport.
- British-American Air Services Ltd, from Heston Airport to Liverpool (Speke) Airport.
- Great Western & Southern Air Lines Ltd, from Land's End Airport to Liverpool (Speke) Airport.
- Isle of Man Air Services Ltd, at Ronaldsway Airport, Isle of Man.
- Jersey Airways Ltd, at Jersey Airport.
- North Eastern Airways Ltd, from Croydon Airport to Liverpool (Speke) Airport.
- Olley Air Service Ltd, from Croydon Airport to Ronaldsway Airport, Isle of Man.
- Personal Airways Ltd, from Croydon Airport to Manchester (Barton) Aerodrome.
- Portsmouth, Southsea & Isle of Wight Aviation Ltd, from Portsmouth Airport to Cardiff (Pengam Moors) Aerodrome.
- Railway Air Services Ltd, from Glasgow (Renfrew) Airport to Bristol (Whitchurch) Airport.
- Scottish Airways Ltd, at Glasgow (Renfrew) Airport.
- Surrey Flying Services Ltd, from Croydon Airport to Weston-super-Mare Airport.
- Western Airways Ltd, at Weston-super-Mare Airport.
- Wrightways Ltd, from Croydon Airport to Manchester (Barton) Aerodrome.

Other aircraft were incorporated into the above fleets from Anglo-European Airways Ltd, Commercial Air Hire Ltd, Guernsey Airways Ltd, International Air Freight Ltd, Mutual Finance Ltd, Southern Airways Ltd, West Coast Air Services Ltd, plus several from the Air Ministry, flying clubs and private owners. Camouflage was applied to some aircraft immediately, others later or not at all. Most NAC aircraft progressively carried civilian registrations underlined in red, white and blue, plus RAF-style marks on fins and elsewhere, particularly for overseas flights.

== Operations ==
From its headquarters at Whitchurch, NAC directed operations of the fleets of Imperial Airways and British Airways Ltd, to support the transportation of military personnel and supplies to France, and to continue basic overseas civilian services. The fleets operated by the smaller private companies were also directed by NAC, and variously used to maintain essential civilian services within the UK, but also for army co-operation duties and transportation of blood supplies, particularly to France. On 1 April 1940, British Airways Ltd and Imperial Airways Ltd were officially combined into a new company, BOAC (British Overseas Airways Corporation), that had already been formed on 24 November 1939 with retrospective financial arrangements. On 27 March, it was announced that many of the non-scheduled functions of NAC would be taken over by the RAF.

== Associated Airways Joint Committee ==
Following the fall of France (22 June 1940), on 27 June 1940, NAC was replaced by a new organisation, the Associated Airways Joint Committee (AAJC), chaired by Sir Harold Hartley. By then, BOAC separately administered overseas flights, such as to non-aligned and neutral nations. The AAJC, from its base at Liverpool (Speke) Airport, took direct control of most of the private air transport operators. From early 1940, about 950 private aircraft, including most of the former NAC fleet, were eventually impressed into RAF service, and suitably militarised as required. No. 24 Squadron RAF was a major recipient and operator of miscellaneous impressed aircraft.
