= North Eastern Airways =

1930s British independent scheduled airline

North Eastern Airways Ltd.
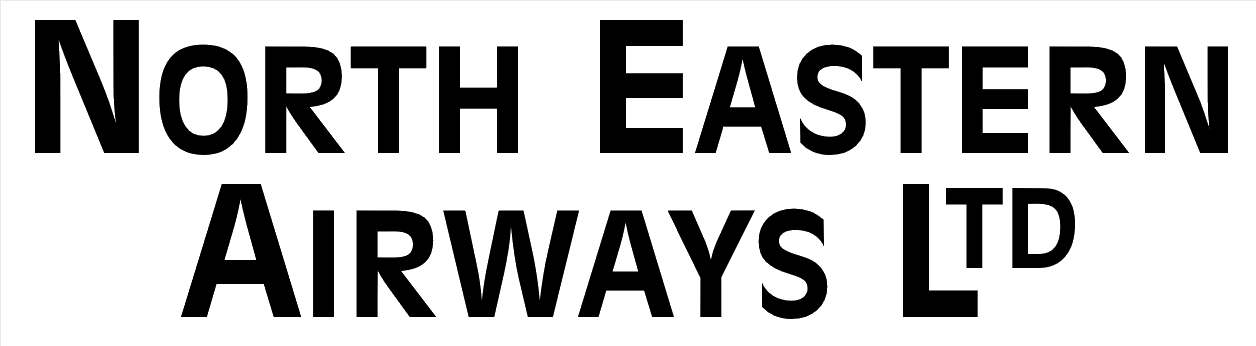
- Founded: 4 March 1935
- Commenced operations: 8 April 1935
- Ceased operations: September 1939
- Hubs: Doncaster Airport
- Secondary hubs: Croydon Airport
- Fleet size: Max 13
- Headquarters: Heston Aerodrome 1935, Croydon Airport from 1936
- Key people: Lord Grimthorpe

North Eastern Airways (NEA) was a British airline which operated from 1935 until the outbreak of World War II in 1939. Based initially in Newcastle upon Tyne, it operated routes from Scotland to London in competition with the railways, retaining its independence to the end.

== History ==
=== Formation ===
The company was formed on 4 March 1935 by a group of investors headed by Ralph Beckett, 3rd Baron Grimthorpe. Lord Grimthorpe was a wealthy banker and racehorse owner who also had a keen interest in aviation. In 1931, with two De Havilland Aircraft Company employees A Hessel-Tiltman and Nevil Shute Norway along with Alan Cobham as directors, he became the chairman of Airspeed Ltd, which went on to create, among other notable aircraft, the Courier and Envoy transport aircraft.

With Lord Grimthorpe's link with Airspeed, it was natural that the first aircraft that NEA acquired were three new Envoy 6-passenger airliners, becoming the first airline customer of the type.

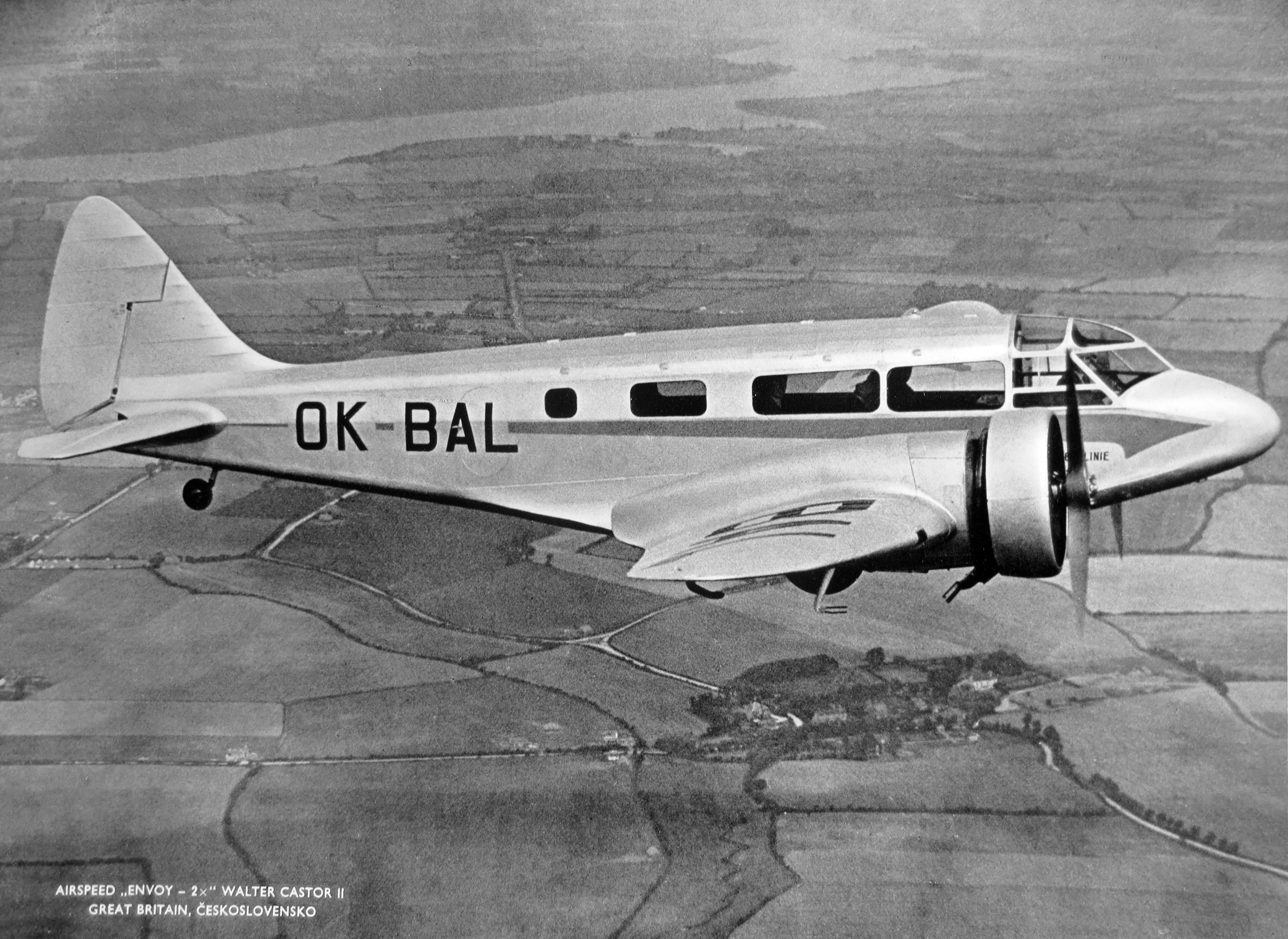
An Airspeed AS.6 Envoy similar to those operated by NEA

The first service to be operated was the east coast route to Scotland, from London (Heston) to Leeds (Yeadon), Newcastle (Cramlington) and Edinburgh (Turnhouse). The fare between London and Edinburgh was £10. The inaugural flight started at Leeds and Bradford Municipal Aerodrome, otherwise known as Yeadon Airport, where on 8 April 1935 the first aircraft, Airspeed Envoy G-ADAZ, was named Tynedale by Mrs Anthony Eden (Beatrice Beckett). The aircraft was then flown, with Mrs Eden and other dignitaries on board, to Heston, where it skidded on landing, running into a fence. While this was an embarrassment for what had been the first ever scheduled flight operated from Yeadon, no one was harmed, and the aircraft suffered only superficial damage.

The Edinburgh leg could not initially be operated due to lack of radio and navigation aids, defeating the object of the exercise. Even when Edinburgh service did start, on 27 May, demand was so low that the whole route was closed on 27 June and the airline's assets were taken over by another of Grimthorpe's companies, Alp Aviation. The reason for the low demand was that existing railway services were fast, regular, comfortable, cheap, and much less dependent on the weather.

The route was restarted by NEA on 2 November 1936. This time the London terminus was Croydon Airport, and the Scottish one was Perth (Scone Aerodrome) which had opened earlier that year. The airport at Newcastle had also changed with the opening of Woolsington Aerodrome (now Newcastle International Airport). Since Edinburgh was now being bypassed, stops, presumably by request, were made at Macmerry Airfield, 15 miles east of Edinburgh. The change of Scottish airport was because of pressure from the London and North Eastern Railway (L.N.E.R.) which was concerned about the competition on the Edinburgh route, and barred its ticket offices and other travel agents from selling the airline's tickets. This time the airline persisted, even extending the service to Aberdeen (Dyce Airport), and by 1937 offering an express service from Croydon to Aberdeen with just one stop (at Doncaster). The Aberdeen link was soon abandoned because of a lack of radio aids there.

=== Growth ===
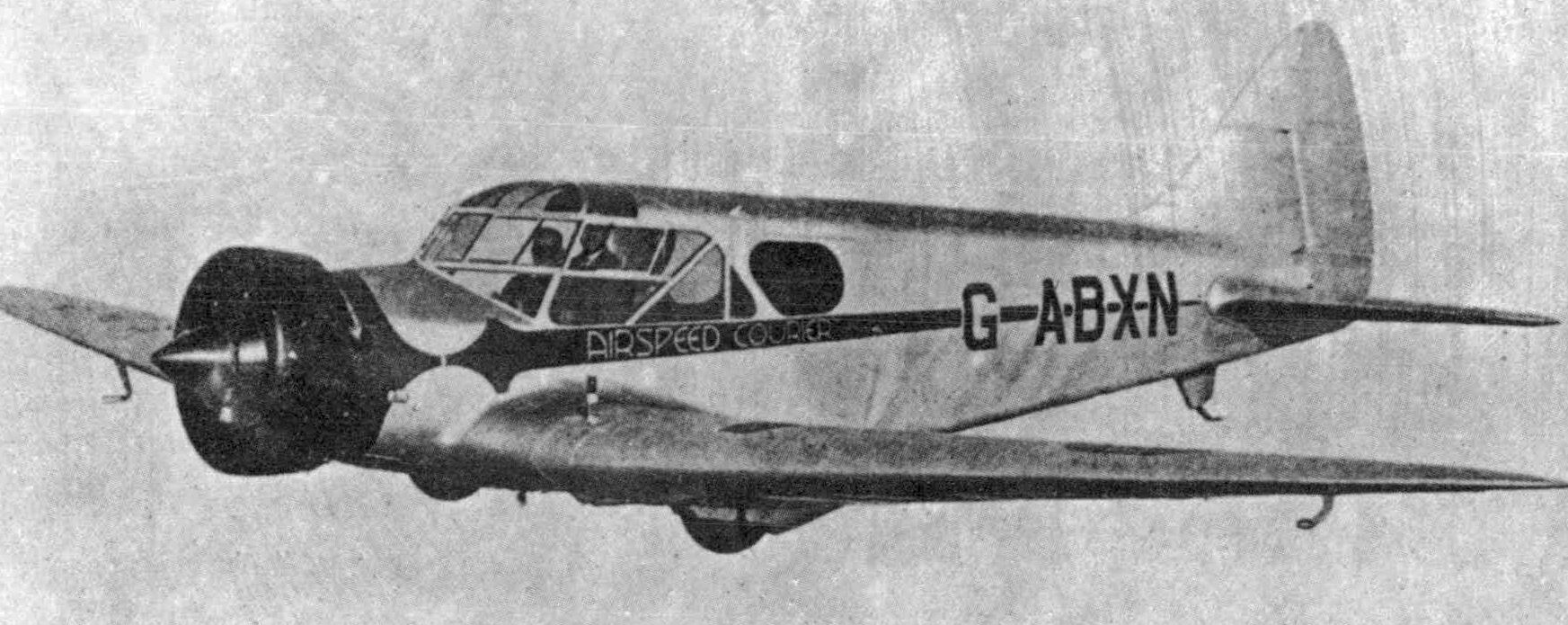
The prototype Airspeed AS.5 Courier G-ABXN before it flew with NEA

1937 was a year of expansion with the addition of De Havilland Rapides to the fleet, and with Doncaster Airport as the hub of new routes to Leeds, to Liverpool (Hooton Park) via Manchester (Barton Aerodrome) and to Hull (Hedon Aerodrome). From Hull they ran a ferry service with the Airspeed Couriers across the Humber Estuary to Grimsby (Waltham Aerodrome), a route pioneered by North Sea Aerial and General Transport in 1932–3. The airline had also established the Doncaster Aero Club as a subsidiary.

1937 was also the year when North Eastern Airways joined the International Air Traffic Association (IATA), later to become the International Air Transport Association. This gave the airline a degree of prestige and assisted in L.N.E.R abandoning their ticket sale ban from 21 December that year. Indeed, cooperation grew, and in the Summer 1938 timetable it is noted that airline tickets and rail tickets on almost all the airline's routes were “interavailable” with L.N.E.R. and L.M.S.R. (London, Midland and Scottish Railway) allowing outward journey by air and return by first-class rail, or outward journey by rail and return by air for a supplement.

When an Airspeed Envoy was delivered to the King's Flight in 1937, Lord Grimthorpe had a plaque installed at the front of the cabin of his Envoys informing the passengers that the aircraft was the same type in which the King flew.

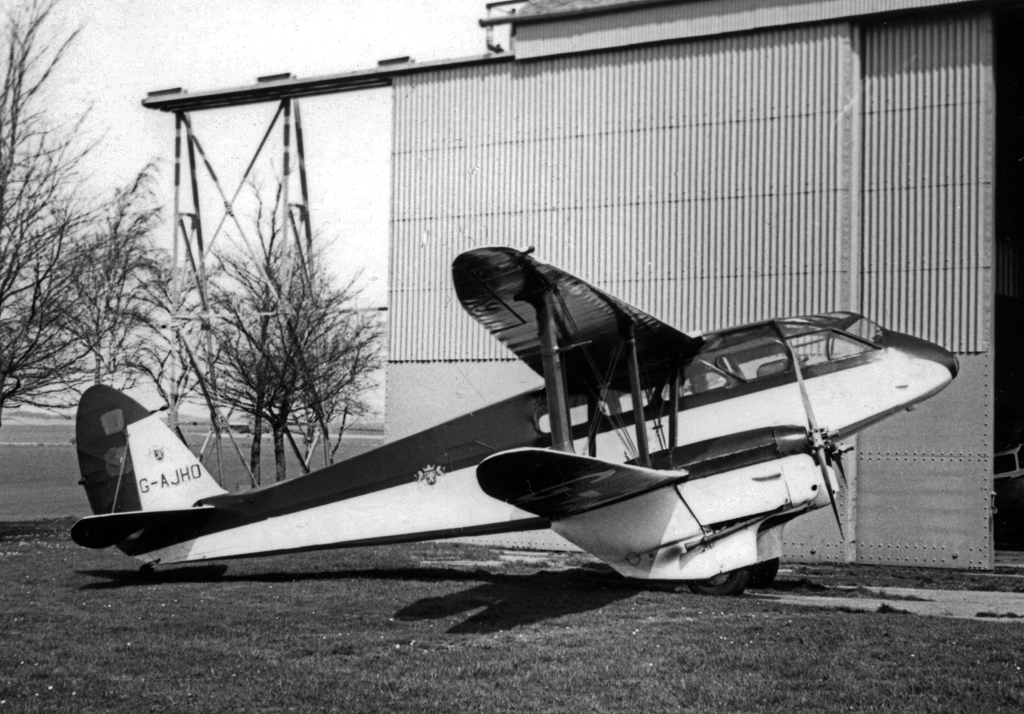
A restored DH.89A De Havilland Rapide

In 1938 NEA operated special services to Glasgow (Renfrew Airport) for the Empire Exhibition which opened on 3 May.

The airline applied for a mail-carrying contract and was initially refused, but later granted, and their first mail flight, from Perth to Newcastle, then onwards on the route via Yeadon and Doncaster to Croydon was flown on 3 October 1938. The first sector of the route was flown by Rapide G-AFEP, and the remainder by Envoy G-ADAZ.

Also in 1938, the airline applied to the Air Ministry for permission to fly a route to Switzerland using Douglas DC-3 aircraft, starting in January 1939. This would have been operated as Alp Air Line, presumably the operating name of Alp Aviation. The plan was rejected.

In 1939 the airline's schedules to both Glasgow and Edinburgh (which had been reinstated in 1938) were replaced by the new Central Scotland Airport at Grangemouth which opened on 1 May. There was a new connection from Perth to Dundee, and a link was established with Scottish Airways for connection from Perth to Inverness, Wick and Orkney. A new summer daily route was advertised between Croydon and Knocke (Le Zoute airport) in Belgium. None of these arrangements would last for long.

=== Demise ===
All NEA's activities stopped with the outbreak of World War II in September 1939, and their headquarters were moved to Liverpool Speke Airport. Most of the fleet had been disposed of during the earlier part of 1939, but the Rapides were retained, coming under the control of National Air Communications (NAC), and were all impressed into military service in early 1940.

One part of the company kept going, however; a subsidiary, Martin Hearn Ltd. Its eponymous founder had worked for Alan Cobham before setting up as an aircraft engineer at Liverpool's Hooton Park in 1935. At some point North Eastern Airways must have acquired it. During the war it was very active assembling, maintaining and repairing military aircraft, possibly with remaining NEA staff working there, and it continued for several years after the war.

Meanwhile, the remains of NEA were bought by L.N.E.R in April 1944, and they possibly sold off Martin Hearn Ltd in 1947 when its name was changed to Aero-Engineering and Marine (Merseyside). Hern himself departed to run a hotel adjacent to the airfield. North Eastern Airways was one of the airlines whose assets were taken over by BEA on 1 February 1947 in the nationalisation of all private scheduled operators, but this was a formality.

== Routes ==
From timetables.

=== April 1935 ===
London (Heston) — Leeds (Yeadon) — Newcastle upon Tyne (Cramlington) — Edinburgh (Turnhouse) weekdays only (Edinburgh 'subject to permission')

=== Summer 1937 ===
London (Croydon) — Doncaster — Leeds Bradford▲ — York▲ — Newcastle upon Tyne▲ — Perth/Dundee — Aberdeen daily (▲ = request stop)

Grimsby — Hull — Doncaster — Manchester — Liverpool (Doncaster — Liverpool operated by KLM Royal Dutch Airlines)

=== April 1939 ===
London (Croydon) — Newcastle upon Tyne — Central Scotland Airport — Perth — Aberdeen daily

London (Croydon) — Knock-Le Zoute daily

== Fleet ==
North Eastern Airways Fleet
Type	Reg	From	To	Fate	Notes
De Havilland DH.84 Dragon	G-ACLE	2 February 1937	20 September 1937	Sold	Ex Crilly Airways. To Allied Airways (Gandar Dower). Impressed as X9397
Airspeed AS.5 Courier	G-ABXN	25 March 1937	19 May 1939	Sold	The prototype Courier. Ex Sir Alan Cobham. To Miss J.M. Parsons. Impressed as X9427
Airspeed AS.5 Courier	G-ACLF	2 February 1937	6 June 1939	Sold	† To Portsmouth Southsea & Isle of Wight Aviation Ltd. Impressed as X9342
Airspeed AS.5 Courier	G-ACLT	2 February 1937	1 February 1939	Sold	† To Air Taxis, Croydon. Impressed as X9394
Airspeed AS.5 Courier	G-ACSZ	15 December 1936	29 May 1937	Crashed	† On approach to Doncaster Airport (pilot Idwal R Jones and 2 passengers killed, and 2 survivors)
Airspeed AS.5 Courier	G-ACVF	2 February 1937	6 June 1939	Sold	† To Portsmouth Southsea & Isle of Wight Aviation Ltd. Impressed as X9437
Airspeed AS.6A Envoy	G-ADAZ	29 March 1935	29 November 1938	Sold	New. Tynedale To AST Hamble. Impressed as DG663
Airspeed AS.6A Envoy	G-ADBA	2 February 1937	14 February 1939	Sold	† To RAF as P5778
Airspeed AS.6A Envoy	G-ADBB	6 April 1935	9 August 1936	Sold abroad	New. Wharfedale To Spanish Republicans but intercepted and used by Nationalists
Airspeed AS.6A Envoy	G-ADBZ	6 April 1935	22 January 1937	Crashed	New. Swaledale Damaged 17 May 1935 in forced landing in snowstorm near Ripon, North Yorkshire. Repaired. Crashed near Oxted, Surrey while leased to Air Dispatch. Crew of two killed.
De Havilland DH.89A Rapide	G-ADDE	21 October 1937	31 March 1940	Impressed	As X9386. Ex Allied Airways (Gandar Dower)
De Havilland DH.89A Rapide	G-ADWZ	21 November 1938	12 April 1940	Impressed	As X9449. Ex Personal Airways
De Havilland DH.89A Rapide	G-AEMH	24 November 1938	28 March 1940	Impressed	As X9387. Ex Personal Airways
De Havilland DH.89A Rapide	G-AEXO	19 April 1937	31 March 1940	Impressed	As X8507. Bought new
De Havilland DH.89A Rapide	G-AEXP	19 May 1937	31 March 1940	Impressed	As X8505. Bought new
De Havilland DH.89A Rapide	G-AFEO	11 April 1938	25 March 1940	Impressed	As X8506. Bought new
De Havilland DH.89A Rapide	G-AFEP	11 April 1938	31 March 1940	Impressed	As X9388. Bought new

† These aircraft were previously sold to Spanish Republican procurement organisations including Union Founders’ Trust, Federation Populaire des Sports Aeronautiques, and Compagnie Air Taxi, Vienna. These export sales were blocked and the aircraft were sold on.

Two other aircraft, De Havilland DH.60G Gipsy Moth G-ABLE and DH.94 Moth Minor G-AFPK were registered to NEA for short periods before being transferred to Doncaster Aero Club.

The livery was overall silver with black lettering and trim.

== Accidents and incidents ==
While operating for North Eastern Airways, Airspeed Courier G-ACSZ was involved in a fatal crash, and Envoy G-ADBZ crash-landed with no injuries and was returned to service. See Fleet list for details.

== Bibliography ==
- Davies, R. E. G. (2005). British Airways: An airline and its aircraft Volume 1: 1919 - 1939. McLean, Virginia, USA: Paladwr Press. ISBN 1-888962-24-0.
- Middleton, D. H. (1982). Airspeed The Company and its Aeroplanes. Suffolk, UK: Terence Dalton Ltd. ISBN 0-86138-009-6.
- Taylor, H. A. (1991). Airspeed Aircraft since 1931. London: Putnam Aeronautical Books. ISBN 0-85177-848-8.
