= 1946 Railway Air Services Dakota crash =

Aircraft accident in London, England

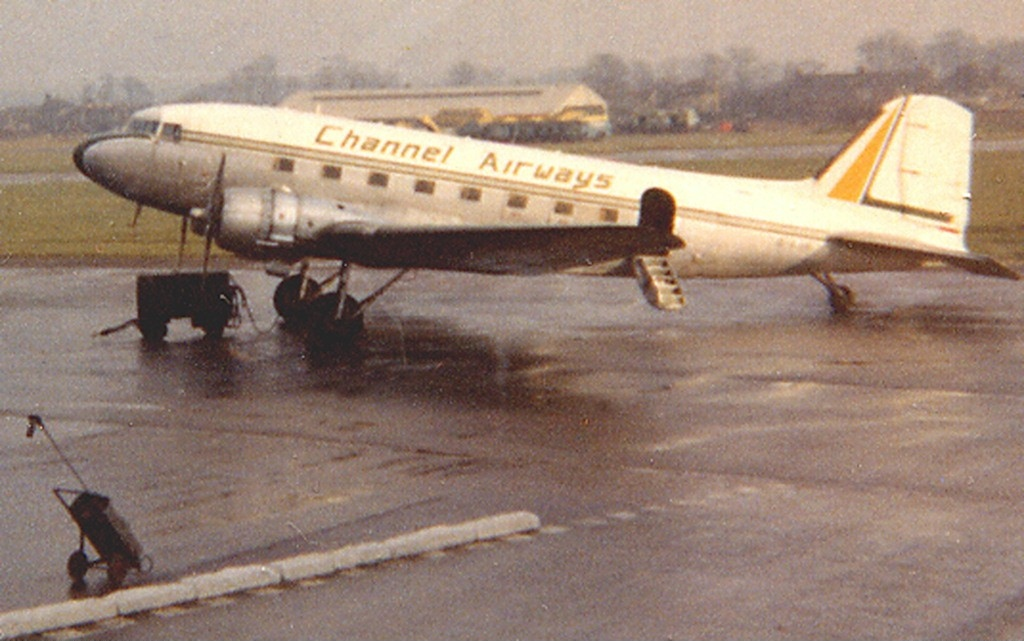
- A Dakota of Channel Airways, similar to the accident aircraft

Accident
- Date: 19 December 1946
- Summary: Failure to climb due to snow and ice contamination of the wings
- Site: 1 km North-East of Northolt Aerodrome, London, United Kingdom; 51°33′34.76″N 0°23′50.78″W

Aircraft
- Aircraft type: Douglas Dakota 3
- Operator: Railway Air Services
- Registration: G-AGZA
- Flight origin: Northolt Airport, London, United Kingdom
- Destination: Renfrew Airport, Glasgow, United Kingdom
- Occupants: 5
- Passengers: 1
- Crew: 4
- Survivors: 5

The 1946 Railway Air Services Dakota crash was the crash of a Douglas Dakota 3 of the British airline Railway Air Services 1 km north-east of Northolt Airport, London, United Kingdom on 19 December 1946.

== Aircraft ==
The Dakota involved made its first flight in 1944 as Douglas C-47A 42-92633 military transport of the United States Army Air Force (USAAF) and had Douglas serial number 12455, it was transferred to the Royal Air Force (RAF) as KG420. KG420 was registered to Railway Air Services as a Dakota 3 in March 1946 with the British registration G-AGZA, powered by 2 Pratt & Whitney R-1830-92 Twin Wasp engines.

== Crash ==
The Railway Air Services Dakota was ready to depart from Northolt Aerodrome, London, United Kingdom on a scheduled service to Renfrew Airport (Glasgow) on behalf of Scottish Airways and had a total of four crew and one passenger on board. The aircraft had been de-iced since it was a cold, snowy evening which had delayed the departure. While the Dakota was waiting the temperature dropped and snow began falling which froze on the wings. The aircraft was finally ready for departure and taxied into position for take-off. The snow storm had closed the airport to incoming traffic and outbound traffic was subject to long delays. The aircraft had been waiting for more than an hour for clearance. When the flight received clearance, the pilot ran the engines up to 45.5 inches of manifold pressure and 2,500 RPM.

When the pilot accelerated down the runway he noticed that when the aircraft lifted off, it could not gain any height. The ice on the wings disturbed the air flow, which resulted in the aircraft not gaining any height. It was however too late to abort take-off so the pilot was forced to try to get the aircraft to climb. The aircraft flew only a few metres high straight down Angus Drive from the end of the runway until the left wing contacted some rooftops and the aircraft slewed through 90 degrees and came to rest on the roofs of two houses at 44 and 46 Angus Drive in the London suburb of South Ruislip.

G-AGZA was severely damaged and radio officer Murdoch was fortunate that he was not sitting in his seat as some metalwork was pushed through the seat and it would probably have killed him had he been sitting there. Irene Zigmund and her 4-month old-son David were in one of the houses (44 Angus Drive) at the time, but the aircraft came to rest on the roof without even waking the child who was asleep in his cot upstairs. In fact no one was injured in the incident, the crew and passenger all descended into the house's loft, down the loft ladder onto the landing and then down stairs out the front door. The aircraft was a total loss and the house was badly damaged. Repairs were completed within six months, although oil stains would re-appear in the ceilings for the next 10 years.

== Investigation ==
It was quickly determined that the cause of the crash was the snow which had frozen to the aircraft's wings while G-AGZA was waiting to take-off, resulting in the aircraft not gaining any height. The house it landed on was subsequently nicknamed "Dakota Rest". The pilot was also assigned a cause factor for an error in judgement by taking off "when the aircraft was almost entirely covered with snow." The crash landing on the houses earned the captain the nickname "Rooftop Johnson".
