= Highland Airways Limited =

Early Scottish regional airline (1933–1938)

Highland Airways Ltd.
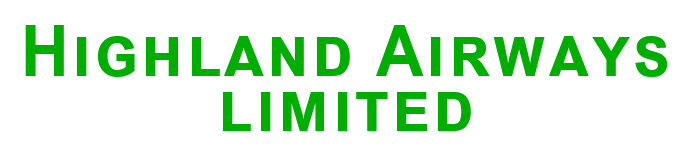
- Founded: 3 April 1933
- Commenced operations: May 1933
- Ceased operations: August 1938
- Operating bases: Longman Airfield, Inverness
- Hubs: Kirkwall, Aberdeen
- Fleet size: Max 7
- Headquarters: Inverness, Scotland
- Key people: Ted Fresson

Highland Airways Limited was established in Inverness, Scotland, by Ted Fresson in 1933 to provide passenger and freight air services between the Scottish mainland and the Northern Isles of Orkney and Shetland, and between their islands. The airline was taken over by Scottish Airways, absorbed by British European Airways in 1947.

== Formation ==
Captain Ernest Edmund "Ted" Fresson had great experience of flying in Scotland, gained by doing several years of pleasure flights for the public, flying from any available fields near populated areas and drawing large crowds. Fresson saw that air services would dramatically reduce the time it took to travel by ship from the mainland to the Northern Isles and to travel between them, and also avoid the often rough conditions at sea. They would appeal to a very wide range of customers, from businessmen and the military to tourists, crofters and ”fisher lassies”.

The public demand encouraged him to form Highland Airways in April 1933, and he became managing director. The company had its offices at 36 Academy Street, Inverness. Its operating base was the city's new airport, Longman Airfield, which, thanks to great support from local businesses, had recently been built by the local council. The initial share capital was £2,675 invested by seventeen shareholders. The chairman was a doctor, Thomas Alexander, and also on the board was Robert Donald, a director of the local motor engineers Macrae and Dick. Other investors included the North of Scotland, Orkney & Shetland Steam Navigation Company and George Law, owner of The Scotsman newspaper. Fresson stated that his objectives for the company were "finance, passengers, mail and newspapers".

== Operations ==
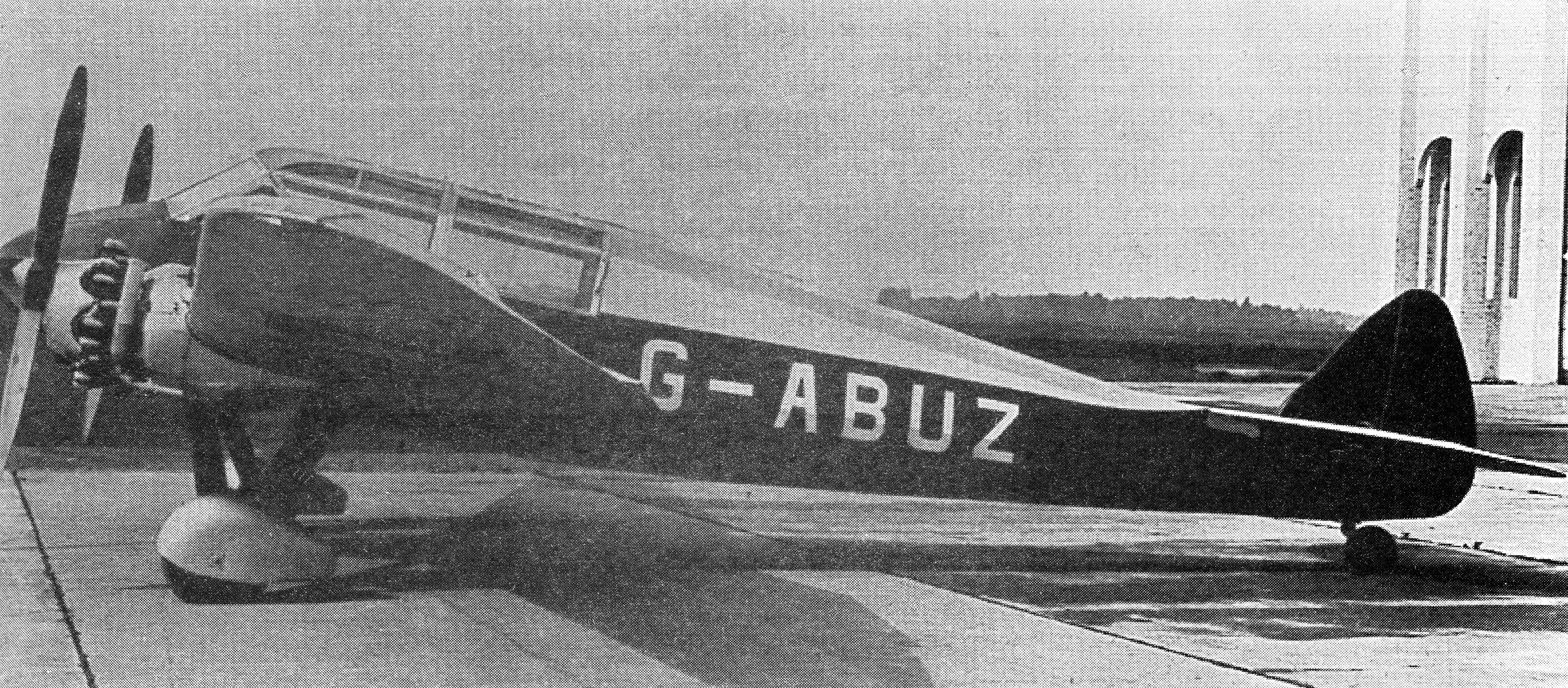
The prototype Monospar ST.4, G-ABUZ in August 1932

Operations started on 8 May 1933 when the airline's first airliner, the three-passenger General Aircraft Monospar ST-4 Mk.II, registered G-ACEW, flew from Longman to Kirkwall, Orkney with a stop at Wick. There is film of the event. The ST-4 was soon fitted with a pannier under the fuselage for the delivery of The Scotsman newspapers. On 3 July Fresson crashed the aircraft into a wall while landing in mist at Wideford, the airfield that the airline used near Kirkwall. A replacement, Monospar 1 G-ABVN, was hired for a few weeks while ‘CEW was repaired by General Aircraft at Croydon Airport. John Sword, of Midland & Scottish Air Ferries, also lent Fresson De Havilland Fox Moth G-ACCT and Airspeed Ferry G-ACBT for around two weeks. The field at Kirkwall's Wideford Farm had been leased by Highland for five years, and they built a hangar and installed an engineer there.

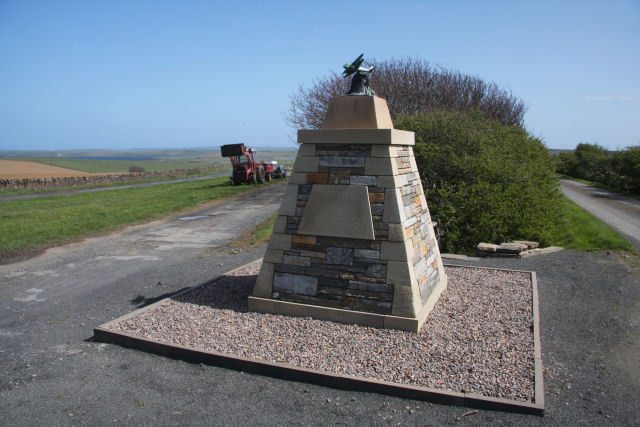
Monument to Ted Fresson at Wideford Farm

Despite the weather, the new airline built a reputation for reliability. In the first year of operations it had achieved a 97% reliability rate, and over the following three years, this rose to 98%. Fresson organised willing islanders into teams of up to twelve men who would grab the wings of a landing aeroplane (the ground speed would be low in the high winds) and hold it down while it was tied to a heavy vehicle.

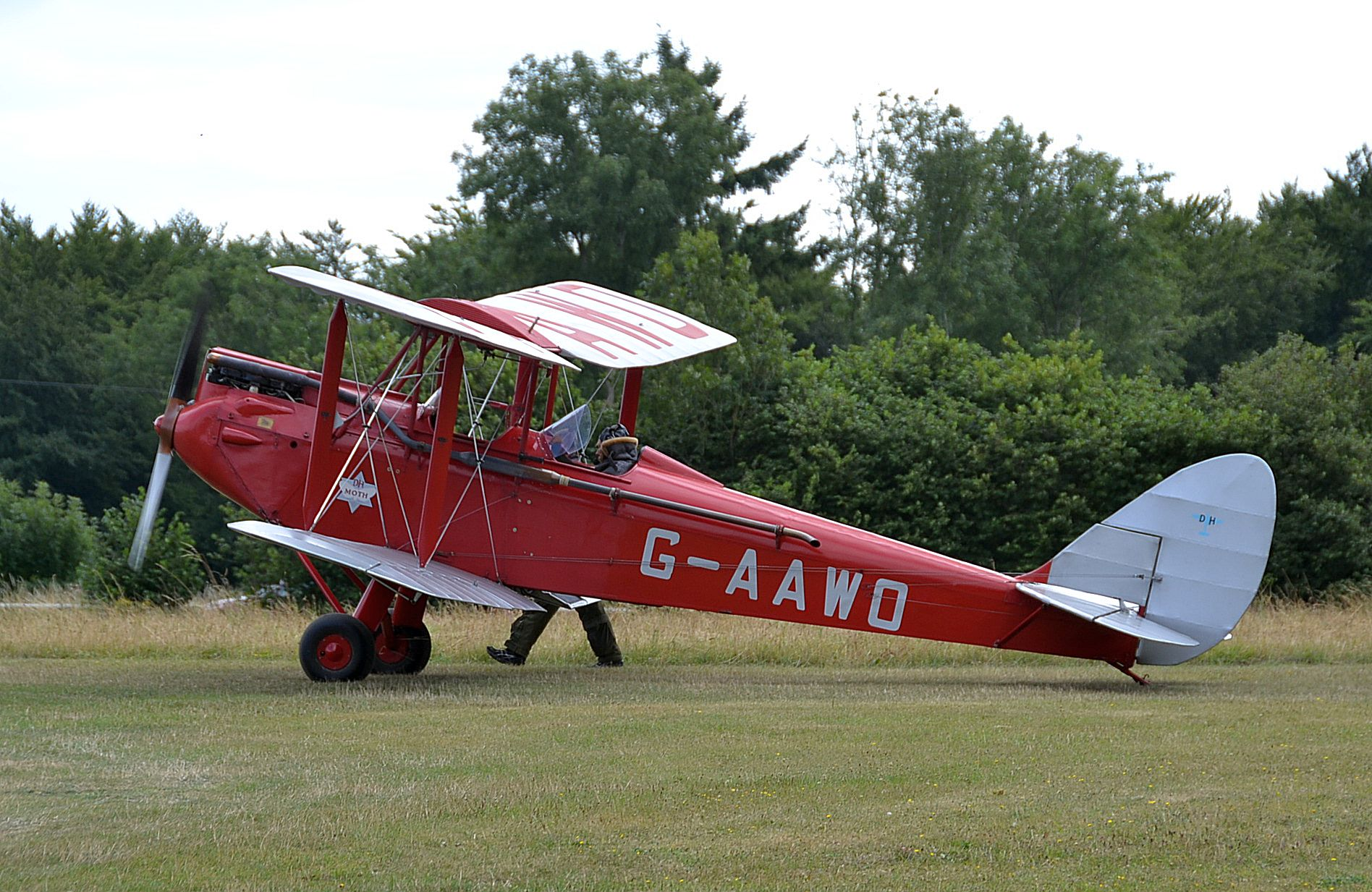
Fresson's Gipsy Moth G-AAWO active in 2013

Fresson made use of the De Havilland DH.60G Gipsy Moth G-AAWO which he had brought from his previous company, and used it for personal transport and for occasional charter flights (it could only carry one passenger). On 3 October 1933 Fresson flew a businessman from Thurso to Lerwick in 'AWO when weather forced them to land in a field next to the Kettletoft Hotel on Sanday. The field later became the landing ground for services to the island. In the same month three salesmen chartered a flight from Aberdeen to Shetland.

On 7 May 1934 the network expanded by serving Aberdeen’s short-lived Seaton Aerodrome, linking it with Inverness and then on to Lerwick in Shetland. The first flight was conducted by Fresson in De Havilland DH.84 Dragon G-ACIT. The use of Seaton was necessary because of intense rivalry with Eric Gandar Dower's Aberdeen Airways. Gandar Dower had recently established Aberdeen Dyce airport but had denied Fresson the use of it, forcing Highland Airways to make other arrangements to serve the city. There had been a gentleman's agreement that Highland Airways would operate to the north of Aberdeen and Aberdeen Airways would operate to the south, but with the railways dominating routes to Glasgow, Edinburgh, and onwards to London, the southern routes were unprofitable, so Gandar Dower turned his attention to the Northern Isles and their competition continued until their later merger into British Airways. Fresson moved from Seaton to a new airfield at Kintore, where he had built a new hangar, moving in on 22 May 1935.

On 29 May 1934 Highland started the UK's first internal airmail service, with a contract for the Inverness to Orkney route, the first flight being flown by Fresson in Dragon G-ACCE. With this, Fresson had achieved all of his objectives for the company and he celebrated by offering pleasure flights at Wideford, and a luncheon at the Kirkwall Hotel. The mail route was soon extended to Wick and Lerwick. The airline started on-demand charter flights to the Northern Isles on 6 August. In October the same year, Orkney County Council awarded the airline a contract to carry patients between the Northern Isles and the hospital in Kirkwall, and later, to Aberdeen.

In late 1934 Fresson tested a DH.89 Dragon Rapide, G-ACPO, for a short time. He was very impressed, but worried about its performance while using the short fields that were common on the islands. He asked De Havilland to add flaps to the wings, which they did, creating the DH.89A version which was ready by April the following year. The flaps could be added to existing aircraft, and many were converted.

Despite all this activity, Highland Airways was not profitable, so Fresson and his board had to make the decision to seek help. A powerful investment company. Whitehall Securities Corporation had recently bought Northern & Scottish Airways, who were based in Glasgow and specialised in flights to the Western Isles. Whitehall had also just established United Airways Limited and were keen to invest in Highland to extend their reach in Scotland, so in June 1935 Highland became part of United, but were allowed to keep their identity and Fresson remained the managing director, albeit with some reduction in authority.

By 1936, more services had been added, including inter-island flights in Orkney, and the route network had been extended to Glasgow, Perth, Sumburgh in Shetland and Stornoway on the Isle of Lewis in the Western Isles. On 13 May 1937 the Monospar ST-4 became the first aircraft ever to land on Fair Isle.

In May 1936 the Air Ministry opened a new radio station in Kirkwall, making navigation, weather reporting and general communication much easier, and encouraging both Fresson and Gandar Dower to expand their operations to the Shetland Isles. A new route linking Aberdeen with Sumburgh in Shetland started in June 1936. Fresson had planned it to start on the 3rd from Kintore with their first DH.89 Dragon Rapide G-ACPN. However his competitor, Aberdeen Airways, beat him with a flight from Aberdeen's Dyce Airport the day before in the same type of aircraft. Fresson was not pleased with what he saw as merely a stunt to steal his thunder.

=== Routes ===
Scottish Airways (Highlands Airways) licensed routes, 1939.

- Kirkwall − Sanday − Stronsay − Westray − Longhope − North Ronaldsay
- Kirkwall − Wick
- Inverness − Wick − Thurso − Kirkwall
- Kirkwall − Shetland
- Thurso − Longhope − Kirkwall

== Demise ==
On 12 August 1937 Whitehall formed one large airline called Scottish Airways. They linked with LMS Railway, and with David MacBrayne, the Scottish ferry company which established Western Isles Airways as its investment tool. They brought Highland Airways and Northern & Scottish Airways into the new airline, still keeping their identities, enabling Fresson to stay in charge of Highland Airways. On 2 May 1938 a new route was started linking Inverness to Glasgow via Perth. In August 1938 Highland Airways did lose its identity, becoming the Northern Division of Scottish Airways, still based in Inverness and with Fresson still in charge. Highland Airways ran down its affairs, and in the summer of 1940 it was liquidated.

On 1 February 1947 the new British European Airways (BEA) took full control of Scottish Airways, and in March 1948, Fresson left the organisation. He was resentful at the way BEA had treated him, and he had received no recompense for the takeover of his airline, except that they gave him his old Gipsy Moth G-AAWO.

== Fleet ==
Highland Airways Ltd fleet, 1933-1939
Type	Registration	Name	From	To	Fate	Notes	Reference
DH.60G Gipsy Moth	G-AAWO	Ah-Wo	June 1933	1 July 1947	Gifted to Fresson by BEA	The name was marked in Chinese characters on the nose. Brought by Fresson from his previous company North British Aviation Co Ltd. Still active in 2025.	
DH.84 Dragon 1	G-ACCE	Caithness	24 March 1933	29 August 1934	Written off	Leased from the Hon. Brian Lewis. Crashed and written off on take-off from Kirkwall with no harm to the occupants.	
DH.84 Dragon 1	G-ACET	Kirkwall	September 1934	5 October 1937	Sold	Later impressed as AW171. Still active in 2020.	
DH.84 Dragon 1	G-ACGK	Loch Ness	11 July 1934	8 January 1935	Ditched off Inverness	After take-off from Longman Airfield, ditched at Longman Point, Inverness. The pilot, Captain Coleman, and both passengers were killed.	
DH.84 Dragon 1	G-ACIT	Aberdeen	24 July 1933	1 March 1949	Sold by BEA	Delivered new. Renamed Orcadian by British Airways. Surviving at the Science Museum at Wroughton in Highland Airways Limited markings.	
DH.84 Dragon II	G-ADCT	Orcadian	June 1935	14 December 1939	Damaged beyond repair	Delivered new. On 6 September 1935 crashed into trees at Westness, Rousay, no injuries, soon repaired. With Scottish Airways, crashed on final approach to Longman Airfield. No injuries among the pilot and seven passengers.	
DH.89A Rapide	G-ACPN		19 April 1936	9 August 1936	Sold to Spain	Leased from British Airways via Airwork Ltd. Remained in BA livery.	
DH.89A Rapide	G-ACPO		19 November 1934	4 December 1934		Demonstrator loaned from Hillman's Airways.	
DH.89A Rapide	G-ADAJ	Inverness	26 December 1936	21 November 1947	Sold by BEA	Named Inverness in July 1937 after the sale of G-ACEW. Crashed in what is now Laos 20 August 1954.	
DH.89A Rapide	G-AEWL	Zetland	20 May 1937	20 November 1947	Sold by BEA	On 8 July 1938 overran on landing at Wideford and struck a ditch – repaired. Crashed in France 1962.	
Monospar ST.4 Mk I	G-ABVN		July 1933	August 1933		Leased from the Hon. Brian Lewis while G-ACEW was being repaired.	
Monospar ST.4 Mk II	G-ACEW	Inverness	2 March 1933	13 July 1937	Sold	Crashed in mist on the approach to Wideford 3 July 1933, and was returned to service in August. Crashed and written off at Croydon 13 December 1937.	

The aircraft livery was overall silver or white with green struts and markings.

== Accidents and incidents ==
The following aircraft were involved in accidents and incidents while they were with Highland Airways: G-ACCE, G-ACGK, G-ADCT, G-AEWL and G-ACEW. See the Fleet List above for details.

== See also ==
- List of defunct airlines of the United Kingdom

== Bibliography ==
- Warner, Guy (2005). Orkney by Air. Erskine, Scotland: kea publishing. ISBN 0951895877.
