= Allied Airways =

Early Scottish regional airline

Aberdeen Airways & Allied Airways (Gandar Dower) Ltd.
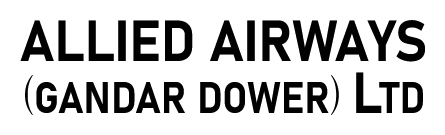
- Founded: 2 January 1934
- Commenced operations: 10 September 1934
- Ceased operations: 12 April 1947
- Operating bases: Aberdeen
- Key people: Eric Gandar Dower

Allied Airways was a UK airline based at Aberdeen, Scotland. Formed in 1934 as Aberdeen Airways it was taken over by British European Airways in 1947.

== History ==
=== Dyce Aerodrome ===
In 1929 Eric Gandar Dower bought a Blackburn Bluebird IV two-seat biplane in which he toured the country and entered air races. In 1931 he landed in a 15 acres (6.1 hectares) field outside the village of Dyce, about 5.5 miles (8.9 kilometres) from Aberdeen, and next to Dyce railway station. National Flying Services had already suggested the site as a municipal airport to the local council in 1930, but they declined. Gandar Dower had the idea of opening a flying school there and in 1933 he had started work levelling the land, installing an electricity supply and building a hangar. He established four companies: Aberdeen Flying School, which would also run the airfield, Aberdeen Flying Club, Aberdeen Aerodrome Fuel Supplies for ground support operations, and an airline, Aberdeen Airways. He was in quite a hurry to get going because Highland Airways had been established at Inverness in 1933 and Ted Fresson, its founder, was looking at also setting up in Aberdeen.

The official opening of Dyce Aerodrome took place on 28 July 1934, although the flying school was already operating. Among the celebrations were competitions, and Ted Fresson won a silver cup and £30. The aerodrome is now Aberdeen Airport.

=== Aberdeen Airways ===
Gandar Dower started Aberdeen Airways on 2 January 1934 and bought De Havilland DH.84 Dragon G-ACRH which arrived on 16 June. After that crashed a few weeks after delivery, he invested more money and bought Short Scion G-ACUV. With this and his chief pilot Eric Starling, he started his first route, between Aberdeen and Glasgow, on 10 September 1934. Hardly any passengers were carried, and he gave up the route on 24 October.

Gandar Dower tried a route to the south of Aberdeen again, this time to Edinburgh, starting on 4 June 1935, but again the service attracted very few passengers and was soon abandoned. The problem was that the railway service to the south from Aberdeen was excellent, fast and relatively cheap, and making connections to Manchester and London, for example, was simple. An airline simply could not compete, so Gandar Dower turned his attention to the north, in particular the Northern Isles of Orkney and Shetland. There, airlines would be competing with the ferries which had to cross the often rough and stormy Pentland Firth, which has some of the strongest tides in the world, and the time saving by air would be revolutionary.

Highland Airways was already serving the Northern Isles, and had an understanding with Gandar Dower that Highland would concentrate on routes to the north while Aberdeen Airways covered routes to the south. This was not turning out well for Gandar Dower, so he promptly broke the pact and started a route between Aberdeen and Stromness on Mainland, Orkney. Gandar Dower already knew that Fresson was planning to extend his operations to Aberdeen, and had prevented him from using Dyce Airport, probably by quoting him excessive landing and passenger fees. Fresson therefore had to use an airfield at Seaton Park in central Aberdeen. In return, Fresson had denied Gandar Dower the use of his airfield at Wideford, just outside Kirkwall, which is why Aberdeen Airways had to use Stromness.

The Stromness route started 27 May 1935, using a field at Howe. The Dragon G-ACAN was mainly used on the route, and alternative fields in the area were occasionally used. A route between Thurso and Stromness was established on 11 June 1935, with an on-demand stop at Berridale near St Margaret's Hope on South Ronaldsay and, later, at Longhope on the island of Hoy.

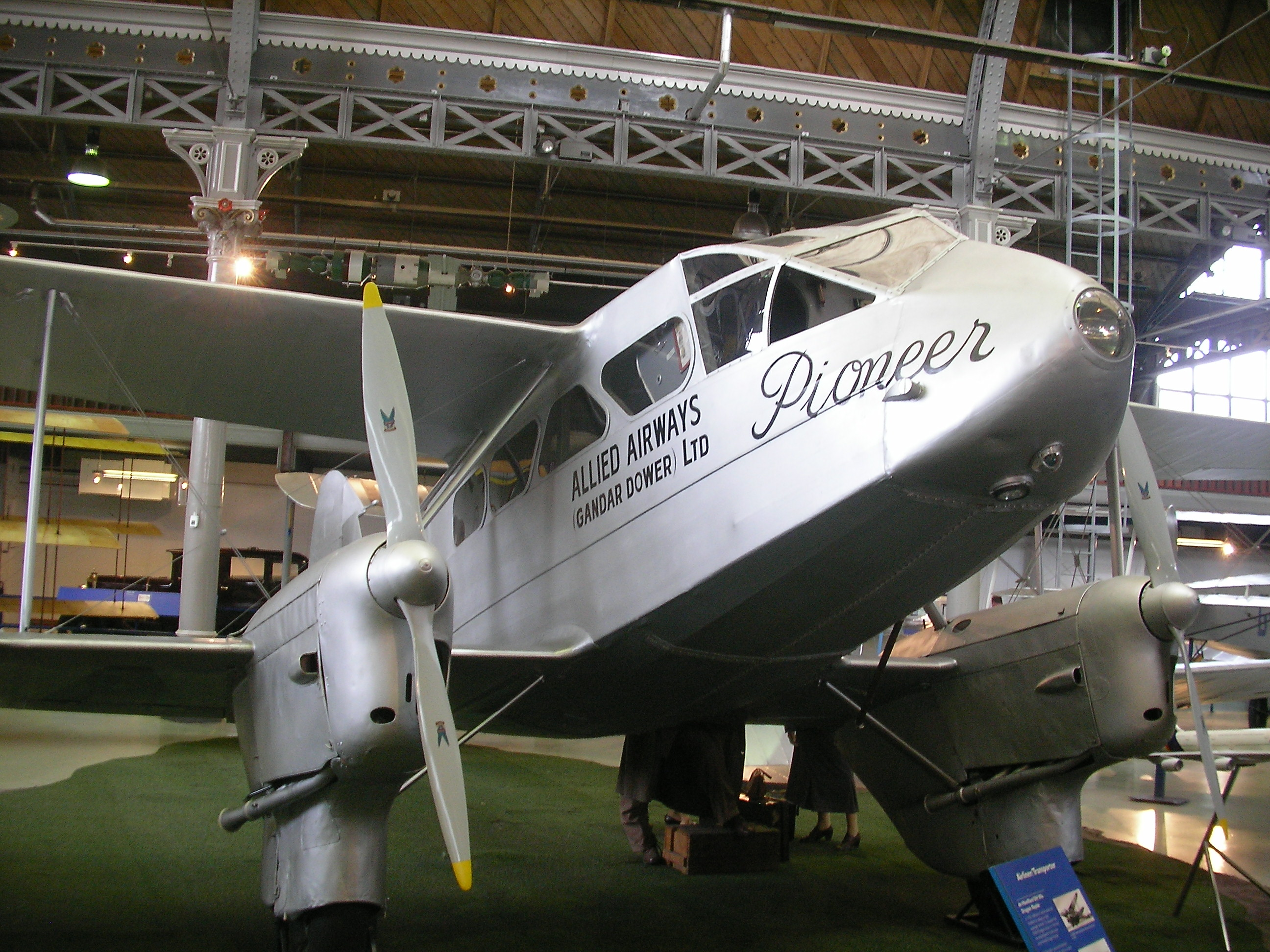
Rapide G-ADAH at the Museum of Science and Industry, Manchester

On 2 February 1936 Eric Starling flew the airline's first air ambulance flight, in Dragon G-ADFI, from South Ronaldsay to Stromness for transfer by road to hospital in Kirkwall.

In May 1936 the Air Ministry opened a new radio station in Kirkwall, making navigation, weather reporting and general communication much easier, and encouraging both Gandar Dower and Fresson to expand to the Shetland Isles. Aberdeen Airways started a new route linking Aberdeen with Sumburgh in the Shetlands in June 1936. Highland Airways had planned to start this route on the 3rd from a new Aberdeen airfield at Kintore, having moved there when Seaton closed. However Aberdeen Airways beat him with a flight by Starling in their new Rapide G-ADDE from Dyce Airport the day before. Fresson was not pleased with what he saw as merely a stunt to steal his thunder. Aberdeen Airways subsequently flew the route via Thurso and Stromness or Quanterness (about 2.5 miles (4.0 kilometres) to the north-west of Kirkwall) using a Dragon.

=== Allied Airways (Gandar Dower) Ltd ===
In July 1914 Gandar Dower, then a correspondent for The Aeroplane magazine, met Norwegian pilot Tryggve Gran, the first pilot to cross the North Sea in a landplane. They met again in 1934 when a Norwegian military flight called at Dyce, and Gandar Dower resolved to start an air service between Aberdeen and Norway.

To this end, he decided on a less parochial name for his airline, and on 13 February 1937, changed its name to Allied Airways (Gandar Dower) Ltd. Gandar Dower, with Starling as pilot, made the first flight from Dyce to Sola Airport, Stavanger, Norway on 22 May 1937 in Rapide G-ADDE, taking 2 hours 55 minutes, and becoming the first aircraft to land at the new airport. Staying for the airport's opening ceremony on 29 May, the aircraft gave a flypast and pleasure flights, and they returned to Aberdeen on 2 June.

A new aircraft had been ordered for the route, a De Havilland DH.86B Express, G-AETM. This was much more suitable, having four engines and being equipped with de-icing equipment, cabin heating, two radios and a toilet, and it carried a crew of three plus eight passengers (presumably in some comfort as the standard seating was for ten to sixteen passengers). Gandar Dower took delivery at De Havilland's factory at Hatfield Airport on 28 June. Back at Aberdeen, the aircraft gave some pleasure flights while final arrangements of the Norway service were completed.

Gandar Dower decided that Aberdeen was not a suitable base for the service as it was not equipped with radio aids and did not have good enough passenger connections. Instead he chose Newcastle's Woolsington Airport in England. This did have the required radio facilities, and had routes by air to Edinburgh, Perth and Glasgow, plus good rail connections.

After a trial flight to Norway, the service officially started on 12 July. It was named the "North Sea Air Mail Express" as it had an airmail contract to carry Norwegian (but not British) mail. The service stopped on 27 September, restarting on 16 April 1938. The service stopped for good on 19 September. Passenger numbers had been worse than disappointing. During July and August 1937 there had been 33 return trips, with a total of 108 passengers, an average of just over 1.5 per flight. In 1938 there were 71 return trips and 137 passengers, averaging under 1 per flight.

During this period, on 23 November 1937, Allied Airways had inaugurated the first regular air mail service between Aberdeen and Sumburgh, with Eric Starling flying Dragon G-ACNJ on the first flight. The aircraft had been named Sir Rowland after Sir Rowland Hill in honour of the founder of the modern Post Office.

=== Routes ===
==== 1938 ====
Routes in 1938.

- Aberdeen — Thurso — South Ronaldsay (on demand only) — Kirkwall/Stromness — Lerwick (mail carried)
- Inverness/Thurso — South Ronaldsay (on demand only) — Kirkwall/Stromness
- Newcastle — Stavanger (Norway)

==== 1939 ====
In 1939 the government licensed all permitted scheduled air routes in the UK. Those licensed for Allied Airways (Gandar Dower) were:

- Thurso – South Ronaldsay – Stromness
- Aberdeen – Wick – Thurso – Kirkwall
- Aberdeen – Thurso – South Ronaldsay – Kirkwall
- Kirkwall – Shetland

=== World War II ===
During World War II, all Orkney air services were suspended, but some services were instructed to resume, Allied Airways flying Aberdeen – Wick – Kirkwall – Sumburgh, using aircraft camouflaged in a brown earth and green scheme. At Kirkwall, where Gandar Dower had closed his Quanterness airfield, Fresson's Wideford airfield was used for a while, but after Allied's Rapide G-ACZF crashed into a stone wall there in late 1941, they moved to RNAS Skeabrae, 7.5 miles (12.1 kilometres) north of Stromness, until 1942, when they moved to the new RAF Grimsetter, now Kirkwall Airport, which is a mile (1.6 kilometres) to the east of Wideford.

The Associated Airways Joint Committee (AAJC) was formed 27 June 1940, replacing the National Air Communications (NAC) which had played a similar role from the start of the war, administering UK civil aviation activities. The AAJC allowed member organisations to cooperate amongst themselves, permitting some sharing of resources. Gandar Dower remained outside the AAJC, preferring independence, but suffering as preference for contracts was given to members, and he was excluded from any pooling arrangements. His airport was requisitioned by RAF Coastal Command, who expanded and developed it, laying hard runways, but his airfields at Thurso and Stromness were rendered unusable.

Along with Scottish Airways (into which Highland Airways had been merged), Allied was kept extremely busy during the rest of the war, with thousands of passengers carried, including civilians, Norwegian refugees, and military personnel, plus freight, mail and newspapers. Air ambulance and search operations for survivors from torpedoed ships were also undertaken. All of this was happening with the constant threat of encountering enemy aircraft. Gandar Dower said that the demands on the airline were huge, but official rewards were totally lacking, saying “No ranks, no gongs, no uniform, no recognition!”

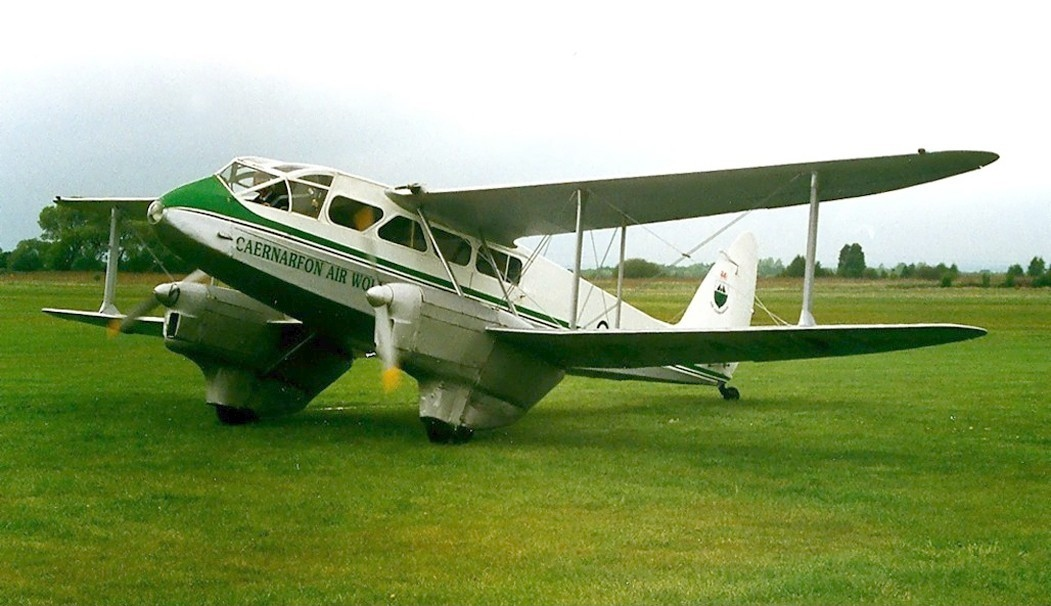
Rapide G-AIDL was used post-war by Eric Gandar Dower, and is still active in 2025

On 19 April 1945 Allied Airways (Gandar Dower) Ltd became one of the 57 founding members of the International Air Transport Association (IATA).

==== Routes 1946 ====
Routes in early 1946.

- Aberdeen – Wick – Kirkwall (thrice weekly)
- Aberdeen – Wick – Kirkwall – Sumburgh (daily except Sunday)

=== Demise ===
On 1 February 1947, the process of absorbing all the AAJC airlines into British European Airways (BEA) started as part of the government plan for the full nationalisation of all UK scheduled airlines, so operators such as Railway Air Services and Scottish Airways were immediately subsumed and lost their identities. BEA also wanted Allied Airways, but Gandar Dower fought them until, on 11 April 1947, he couldn't run his scheduled flights because of a lack of serviceable aircraft, so BEA summarily confiscated the airline.

In what was seen as a very cynical move by their management, two days later, Fresson, who was still working for BEA after it had taken over Scottish Airways, was sent to Aberdeen to manage the transfer. He said of the event “I have always felt that at that moment Gandar Dower and I became friends in adversity. We had been blatantly robbed of many years' hard work and effort”. Gandar Dower was left with a few aircraft and a hangar at Dyce and held on for many years. He fought long and hard for compensation (including asking questions in the House of Commons directly about the matter) and eventually received £132,530 from BEA on 30 May 1973.

== Fleet ==
Aberdeen Airways and Allied Airways fleet, 1934-1947
Type	Registration	Name	From	To	Fate	Notes	Reference
DH.80A Puss Moth	G-ABLS		7 May 1931	11 March 1959	Sold	Gandar Dower's personal aircraft, used occasionally by the airline. Still active in 2024	
DH.84 Dragon	G-ACAN	The Starling	17 September 1934	21 May 1941	Written off	The prototype Dragon. Named The Starling in later years. Damaged beyond repair in forced landing at Dunbeath, Caithness. No injuries among the seven occupants	
DH.84 Dragon	G-ACLE	Old Bill	30 September 1937	15 May 1939	Sold	Sold to Western Airways, later impressed as X9397	
DH.84 Dragon	G-ACNJ	Sir Rowland	6 December 1937	29 June 1945	Sold	Scrapped at Dyce 1946	
DH.84 Dragon	G-ACRH	Aberdonian	16 June 1934	13 July 1934	Crashed	Bought new. Crashed and burned at Dyce	
DH.84 Dragon	G-ADFI	The Silver Ghost	5 September 1935	3 July 1937	Written off	Damaged by fire while parked at Thurso	
DH.86B Express	G-AETM	Silver Star; The Norseman	6 April 1937	18 April 1939	Sold	Delivered as Silver Star. Sold to Western Airways	
DH.89A Rapide	G-ACZE, G-AJGS	The Don, Vagabond	21 September 1941	18 December 1949	Sold	Ex Z7266. Crashed at Kirkwall 27 December 1945 and rebuilt as G-AJGS, redelivered and renamed 12 March 1948. Later re-registered G-ACZE, then sold to USA as N1934D and with the Military Aviation Museum in Virginia Beach, Virginia in 2020	
DH.89A Rapide	G-ACZF	Carina	16 May 1939	20 August 1948	Withdrawn by BEA	Damaged in late 1941 when the tail was "knocked off" at Wideford, and repaired at Dyce	
DH.89A Rapide	G-ADAH	The Thurso Venturer, Pioneer	26 October 1938	18 February 1959	Withdrawn	Damaged at Wideford, Kirkwall in September 1940 and repaired. At The Aeroplane Collection in Hooton Park, Cheshire in Allied Airways (Gandar Dower) Ltd markings in 2024	
DH.89A Rapide	G-ADDE	The Aberdonian	7 May 1935	21 October 1937	Sold	Bought new and took the name of G-ACRH. Damaged in forced landing in fog on a Dyce — Shetland flight 10 September 1936 and repaired. Later impressed as X9386. Bought back by Allied in 1947, probably used for spares	
DH.89A Rapide	G-AFME		23 December 1942	23 April 1943	Returned to RAF	Impressed as Z7257 in 1940 then loaned to Allied Airways. Returned to the RAF and scrapped 3 March 1945	
DH.89A Rapide	G-AGDM	Eldorado	11 November 1941	14 May 1948	Sold by BEA	Delivered new. Moved to French Guiana in April 1957, cancelled in 1966	
DH.89A Rapide	P9588, G-AGHI	The Shetlander	15 January 1943	1 June 1948	Sold by BEA	RAF, loaned to Allied Airways, who bought it 30 April 1943, gaining the civil registration on 2 December 1943	
DH.89A Rapide	G-AIDL	The Wanderer	23 August 1946	19 April 1950	Seized by court order	Delivered new to Eric Gandar Dower but also used by the airline, it was seized by High Sheriff of Oxfordshire and auctioned. Still active in 2025	
Short Scion 1	G-ACUV	Scion	20 August 1934	14 May 1939	Sold	First production Scion, delivered new after appearing at the SBAC show at Hendon. Cancelled in 1946	

The early livery consisted of the upper half of the fuselage and engine nacelles yellow and the lower halves purple - the colours of Cambridge University Amateur Dramatic Club of which Gandar Dower had been a member. A thin white stripe separated the colours. Wings and tail surfaces were silver and registration letters were black. Other lettering was yellow on the purple surfaces. Later a plain silver scheme was adopted with black lettering.

== Accidents and incidents ==
The following aircraft were involved in accidents and incidents while they were with the airline: G-ACAN, G-ACRH, G-ADFI, G-ACZE, G-ACZF, G-ADAH and G-ADDE. See Fleet above for details.

== See also ==
- List of defunct airlines of the United Kingdom
