= E. E. Fresson =

British engineer and aviation pioneer (1891–1963)

Ernest Edmund Fresson OBE
- Born: 20 September 1891
- Died: 25 September 1963 (aged 72)
- Military career
- Allegiance: United Kingdom
- Rank: Captain
- Conflicts: First World War

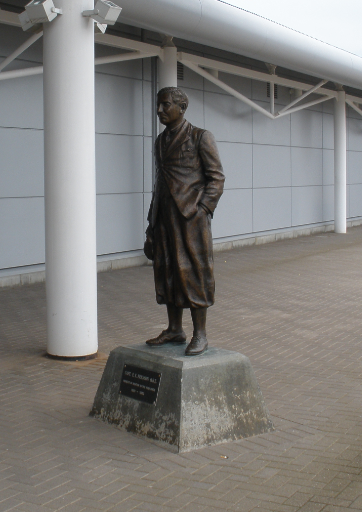
Fresson statue at Inverness Airport

Captain Ernest Edmund Fresson, OBE (20 September 1891 – 25 September 1963) was a British engineer and aviation pioneer.

== Life ==
Fresson was sent by his company to China in 1911, but returned to the UK to serve in the Royal Flying Corps during the First World War, undergoing flying training in Canada in 1918. On 12 January 1918, he was commissioned in the Royal Flying Corps of the British Army as a temporary second lieutenant (on probation). His commission and rank were confirmed on 29 September 1918. He was transferred to the unemployed list on 27 June 1919, thereby ending his military service.

After the war he went back to China where he built, reassembled and designed aircraft for local dignitaries. He returned to the United Kingdom after the 1927 revolution, and started giving joy rides to the public, flying for a company called Berkshire Aviation Tours, touring England and Scotland, flying from any available fields. He was given a commission in the Royal Air Force's Reserve of Air Force Officers as a pilot officer on probation on 17 May 1927. He was promoted to flying officer on 17 November 1927.

In January 1929 with another Berkshire pilot he founded North British Aviation Co Ltd, based at Hooton Park on the Wirral Peninsula, Cheshire. This company performed pleasure flights and air displays in the northwest of England, mainly using Avro 504K aircraft, and was incorporated into Alan Cobham's Flying Circus in 1933. He established an airline, Highland Airways, in Scotland in April 1933. He was awarded the first contract for domestic airmail in the UK on 29 May 1934, flying between Inverness and Orkney.

During the Second World War, he advised the Air Ministry and Admiralty on where to build its airfields in Scotland: he is credited with building the first tarmac runway built in the UK, at RNAS Hatston, Orkney. His airline was absorbed into the wartime Scottish Airways, and into the nationalised British European Airways Corporation after the war: he continued to work in the airline's management until he was let go in March 1948. In retirement, he continued to fly charter passengers across northern Scotland.

== Honours ==
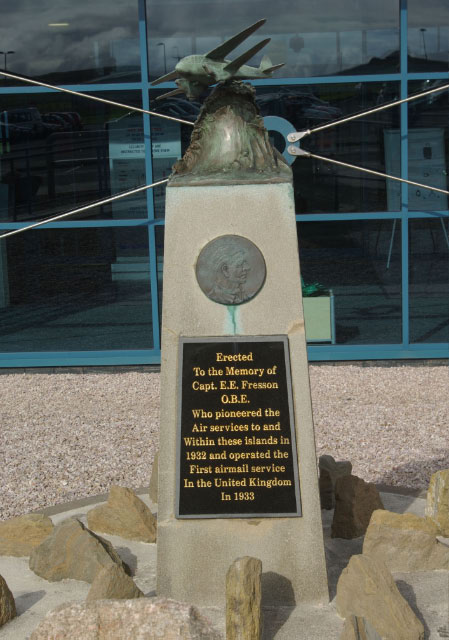
Fresson Monument, Kirkwall Airport

In the 1943 Birthday Honours, he was appointed an Officer of the Order of the British Empire (OBE) in recognition of his work as managing director of Scottish Airways Limited.

In 2011, a bronze statue of Fresson was unveiled at Sumburgh Airport. A memorial to him stands in front of Kirkwall Airport.

== Selected works ==
- Fresson, E. E. (1967). Air Road to the Isles: The Memoirs of Captain E. E. Fresson. David Rendel Ltd. ASIN B001AQD2WG
