= Eric Gandar Dower =

British politician

Eric Leslie Gandar Dower (2 July 1894 – 4 October 1987) was a Scottish Unionist Party politician and businessman.

== Life ==
Gandar Dower was born in London on 2 July 1894. He was educated at Brighton College, like his elder brother Leonard, and at Jesus College, Cambridge, and trained for the stage at the Royal Academy of Dramatic Art, touring with a number of theatre companies.

Gandar Dower established Aberdeen Airport and Aberdeen Airways serving routes between Aberdeen and Edinburgh, Glasgow, Wick, Thurso, Kirkwall, and Stromness. The airline changed its name to Allied Airways (Gandar Dower) Ltd. when it started the first British/Norwegian airline route, between Newcastle and Stavanger in 1937. He served as a Flight Lieutenant in the Royal Air Force Volunteer Reserve from 1940 to 1943.

Following World War II, Gandar Dower was elected as Conservative Member of Parliament for Caithness and Sutherland at the 1945 general election with a majority of just 6 in the tightest ever three-way marginal: just 61 votes separated him from the third-placed candidate, Liberal Party parliamentary leader Archibald Sinclair. He based his 1945 election platform on serving as a wartime MP until the end of the conflict with Japan. His election address stated, "If I am returned I shall resign when Japan is beaten and stand again at the by-election which will follow, so that you can decide whether you wish me to continue as your representative in peace" and followed this up with an eve-of-poll "special message" stating, "Note - Gandar Dower, if elected, has pledged himself to resign at the end of the Japanese war and to stand again at the resultant by-election."

In his victory speech at the declaration, Gandar Dower said, "Don't regard me as a Unionist. I am a member of the National Party until the end of the Japanese war, when you will then have a chance again to put me in or out." After the war ended on 14 August 1945, he did not resign, but pledged to do so "later". On 14 February 1946, he announced that he would shortly be resigning his seat but later withdrew the resignation. On 28 December 1946, he offered to resign in the New Year, citing the marriage of his Private Secretary as a reason, but he withdrew this resignation on 11 February, citing the "rumours and cross-rumours" in the press which had been caused by his announcement, and how they "have been damaging to the Unionist cause." On 30 June 1947, The Times reported, "With the forthcoming fusion of the Caithness and Sutherland Conservative Associations it is certain that there will be no by-election in this constituency. Backed by the unanimous support of both associations, Mr. E.L. Gandar Dower, the Conservative MP for Caithness and Sutherland, will hold his seat probably until the next General Election."

At a 15 September 1948 meeting of his local Conservative Association, Gandar Dower attempted to bring matters to a head by calling on the association to renominate him as the Conservative candidate for a by-election that he now intended to trigger. He was overwhelmingly defeated, with only 8 members voting for him to follow through with this course of action and numerous members expressing their dissatisfaction. In response to this, he declared that he would be standing at the next general election as an Independent, and from 3 October 1948, he withdrew from the Conservative whip. On 12 December 1948, the Caithness and Sutherland Conservatives selected David Robertson to replace Gandar Dower. In the event, Gandar Dower decided not to seek re-election at all, and he retired at the 1950 general election.

== Family ==
Gandar Dower's brother, Alan, also served as a Conservative member of parliament, while another, Kenneth, was a leading sportsman, author of several travel and war time books, and an explorer and early aviator. His other brothers were Leonard Francis, who was died on 3 May 1917 in the Arras offensive on the Western Front during the First World War, and Ronald Willie, who was High Sheriff of Bedfordshire in 1933 and had served in the Honourable Artillery Company and Royal Field Artillery during the First World War and Harold who died at one month of age. They all used different versions of their surname: Gandar Dower, Dower and Gandar-Dower respectively.

Parliament of the United Kingdom
Preceded by Archibald Sinclair	Member of Parliament for Caithness and Sutherland; 1945–1950	Succeeded by David Robertson
