= Renfrew Airport =

- IATA: none; ICAO: none

Summary
- Airport type: Defunct
- Location: Renfrew, Renfrewshire, Scotland
- Opened: 1914
- Closed: 2 May 1966
- Coordinates: 55°51′52″N 004°23′03″W

Map
- Location of Renfrew Airport in Renfrewshire Renfrew Airport (the United Kingdom)

Runways
Direction	Length		Surface
Direction	ft	m	Surface
08/26	5,787	1,764	Paved surface
03/21	3,839	1,170	Paved surface
- Source of data: UK Airfield Guide

Renfrew Airport was an airport located in Renfrew, Renfrewshire. The airport served the city of Glasgow until it was decommissioned in 1966 and was replaced by Glasgow Airport located 2 kilometres away in Abbotsinch.

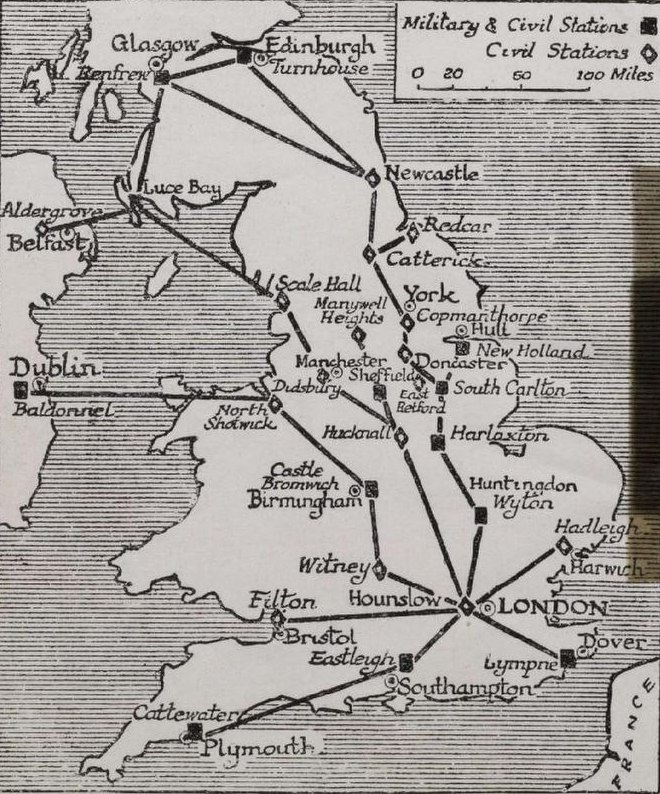
"Map of Air Routes and Landing Places in Great Britain, as temporarily arranged by the Air Ministry for civilian flying", published in 1919, showing Castle Bromwich as a "military and civil station".

== History ==
=== Military use ===
Already in existence as a military facility during the First World War, it first handled scheduled flights in 1933 with the first regular destination being Campbeltown. During the Second World War it served as RAF Renfrew.

The following units were here at some point:

- No. 6 (Glasgow) Aircraft Acceptance Park (1918) became No. 6 (Renfrew) Aircraft Acceptance Park (1918–20)
- No. 6 (Scottish) Aircraft Repair Depot (1918-?)
- No. 55 Squadron RAF (1919-20)
- No. 80 Squadron RAF (1949)
- No. 309 Squadron RAF (1940-41)
- No. 602 Squadron AAF (1925-33) returning as No. 602 Squadron RAuxAF (1952-54)
- No. 666 Squadron RAuxAF (1951-52)
- 823 Naval Air Squadron
- 1831 Naval Air Squadron

=== Post war ===
Despite the construction of a new terminal building (with a parabola arch) in 1954, it became evident that the airport was unable to cope with the increasing demands for domestic air travel in the 1960s. The final departure took place on 2 May 1966 – its destination being the new Glasgow Airport a few hundred metres away.

== Commercial service ==
The airport was served by airlines such as Scottish Airlines, Aer Lingus, Railway Air Services and British European Airways, for destinations in Scotland and London.

Icelandair offered flights to Iceland and a number of destinations in Europe. Other airlines offering international flights were Dan-Air, Sabena and LOT Polish Airlines.

== Statistics ==
The airport handled 138,146 passengers in its first year of operations. By the end of the decade, the airport was handling more than half a million passengers annually; one million passengers passed through the airport for the first time in the year 1964. In the year of the airport's closure, it handled 1.4 million passengers.

Year	Number of Passengers	% Change
1950	138,146	Steady
1951	139,599	▲1
1952	156,916	▲12.4
1953	210,023	▲33.8
1954	258,481	▲23.1
1955	305,574	▲18.2
1956	373,948	▲22.4
1957	436,561	▲16.7
1958	443,481	▲1.6
1959	528,682	▲19.2
1960	652,180	▲23.4
1961	741,398	▲13.7
1962	854,988	▲15.3
1963	996,264	▲16.5
1964	1,150,506	▲15.8
1965	1,240,066	▲7.8
1966	1,406,879	▲13.5

1 combined with the new Glasgow Airport

== Current use ==
The site is now occupied by a Tesco supermarket and the M8 motorway; this straight and level section of motorway occupies the site of the runway.[5] Opened in March 1968, the M8 connected the new Glasgow Airport to Bishopton in the west and Glasgow city centre (via Hillington) in the east. The entire airport was demolished in 1978. Arkleston Primary School (1972) and a Tesco superstore (1980) were built on the former terminal site, and the whole of the surrounding area is now covered with housing.

The only trace left of the airport is the Flying Scotsman pub which was the Hertz car rental building, opposite the terminal building.

== In fiction ==
The airport features briefly in the second novel of a space opera series by Angus MacVicar, Return to the Lost Planet. One of the characters is about to fly back from Scotland to Berlin, but the hero and his companion join him at the last minute on the bus from St. Enoch, Glasgow, to the airport, and persuade him to stay and help them.
