= Railway Air Services =

British airline

Railway Air Services Ltd. (RAS) was a British airline formed on 21 March 1934 by the Big Four railway companies (the GWR, LMS, LNER and SR) and Imperial Airways. The airline was to be a domestic airline operating routes within the United Kingdom linking up with Imperial's services. After World War II scheduled operations were merged into British European Airways.

== Prewar routes ==
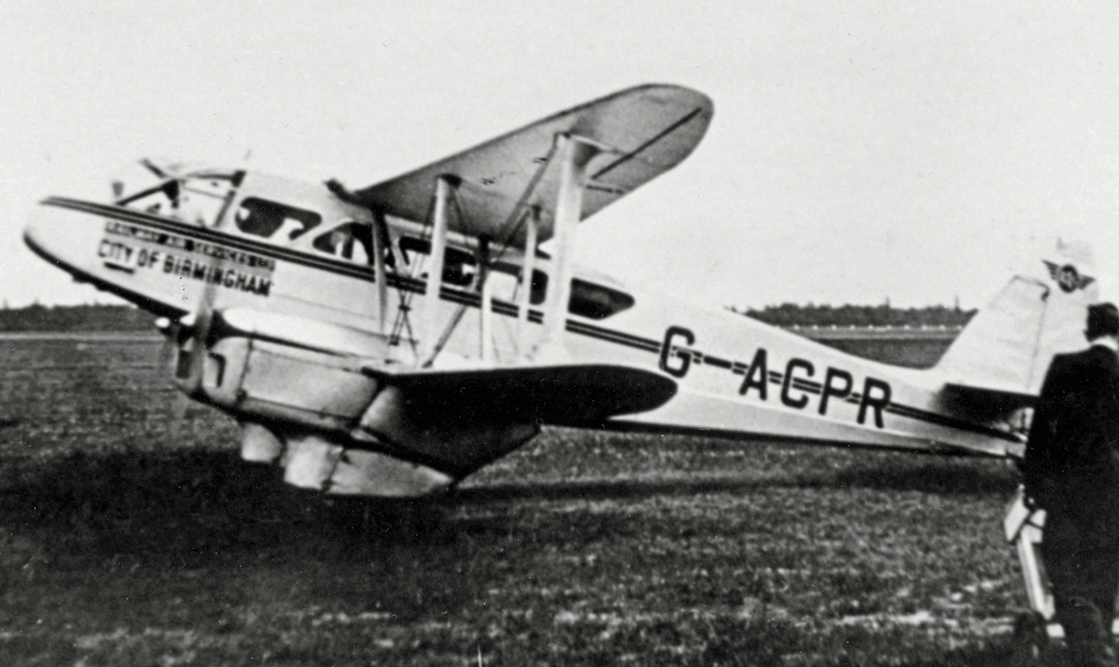
DH.89 Dragon Rapide at Manchester Airport in 1938

The airline's main operating and maintenance base was at London's Croydon Airport pre- and post-war, and at Liverpool airport during World War II. Scheduled operations were launched on 7 May 1934. The most important route flown was between London and Scotland (London-Birmingham-Manchester/Liverpool-Belfast-Glasgow). The trunk service commenced on 20 August 1934, using the airline's newly delivered DH.86 Express four-engined biplane airliners, which operated once daily in each direction. The service was mainly aimed at passengers wishing to connect at Croydon Airport with IALs flights to the Continent. RAS were unhappy with winter operations at Manchester's small airfield at Barton Aerodrome and the flights switched to the larger Liverpool (Speke) airport from the late October, resuming through Barton on 15 April 1935.

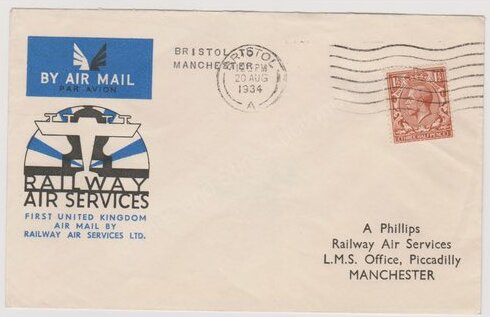
Railway Air Services printed envelope, for the Bristol to Manchester route. Postally marked "Bristol, 20 August 1934"

Routes operated from Cardiff Municipal Airport included Cardiff to Plymouth and Cardiff to Liverpool and commenced in 1934.

== World War II ==
In 1939, the operation of civil aircraft was restricted and part of the RAS fleet was placed under government control. The aircraft were involved in communications flights for the military within the British Isles. By 1940, the Royal Air Force had taken over all the military communications tasks and the airline returned to flying routes "of national importance". In practice, wartime operations were restricted to the Liverpool-Belfast-Glasgow route carrying government and other priority passengers and mail. Operations mainly integrated in those of Associated Airways Joint Committee from 6 May 1940 till 13 Nov 1944.

== Postwar operations ==
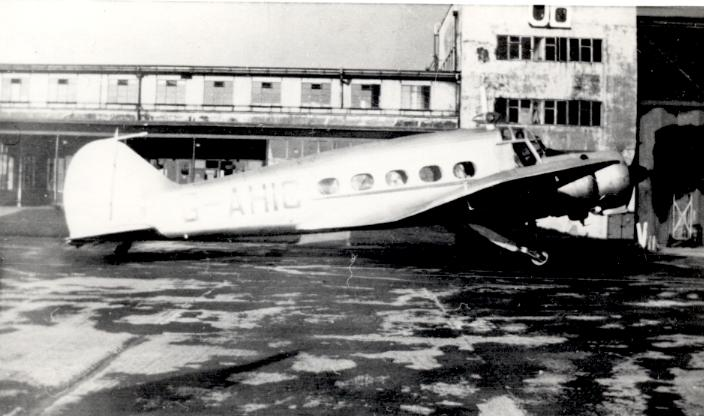
Avro Anson at Manchester Airport in 1946 operating the schedule to Belfast

Railway Air Services resumed peacetime flights in early 1946, now also using their newly acquired Avro Ansons. A new twice-daily scheduled service commenced on 29 July 1946, using the Ansons, which linked Croydon with Manchester Ringway and Belfast (Nutts Corner) Airport. Ex-RAF Douglas DC-3s became part of the fleet and they could carry more passengers, on non-stop flights from Croydon to Glasgow (Renfrew) Airport. Four of ex German military Junkers Ju 52 trimotor aircraft were used during 1946/47 before retirement and scrapping.

== Nationalisation ==
In August 1946, the UK government formed the British European Airways Corporation (BEA) a state-owned airline. The airline was given a monopoly of scheduled air services within the United Kingdom and to continental Europe. From 1 August 1946 RAS operated all its services on behalf of BEA until it ceased operations on 31 January 1947 with BEA acquiring the RAS aircraft, staff and routes. A memory does live on however. DH.89A Dragon Rapide G-ALXT is preserved by the Science Museum in RAS colour scheme and named 'Star of Scotia'. It is currently in storage at Wroughton. This was not a RAS aircraft, but takes its name from DH. 89 G-AEBX which crashed near Belfast on 3rd July 1938.

== Fleet ==
- Junkers Ju 52/3m (1946-1947)

== Accidents and incidents ==
- On 1 July 1935, de Havilland Dragon G-ADED crashed on take-off from Ronaldsway Airport, Isle of Man, injuring all seven people on board. The aircraft, which was operating a scheduled passenger flight from Ronaldsway to Ringway Airport, Manchester via Squires Gate Airport, Blackpool and Speke Airport, Liverpool was destroyed in the subsequent fire.
- On 6 June 1936, DH. 89 Dragon Rapide "Star of Lancashire", following a forced landing, on Deane golf course, Bolton, Lancashire, the aircraft ran through a fence, destroying the port wings, engine nacelle and landing gear. The pilot and the three passengers were unhurt.

== See also ==
- List of defunct airlines of the United Kingdom
