= Western Airways =

British airline and engineering company

Norman Edgar (Western Airways) and Western Airways
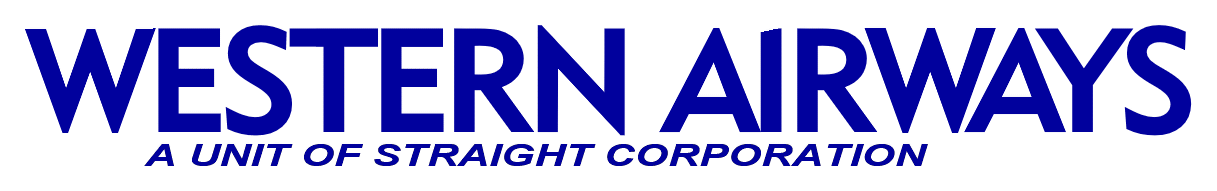
IATA	ICAO	Call sign
–	–	Shovel
- Founded: 1933 (as Norman Edgar (Western Airways)
- Commenced operations: 1933 (as Norman Edgar (Western Airways)
- Ceased operations: 1952 (airline-type operations), 1978 (all operations)
- Hubs: Weston-super-Mare Airport
- Parent company: Straight Corporation Ltd
- Key people: Norman Edgar, Whitney Straight

in U.S.A.

Western Airways Ltd. was an airline based in Weston-super-Mare, Somerset, England between 1933 and 1978. Before World War II, for a short period, it was the world's busiest airline. It survived WWII by using its aircraft engineering expertise.

== History ==
=== Origins and development ===
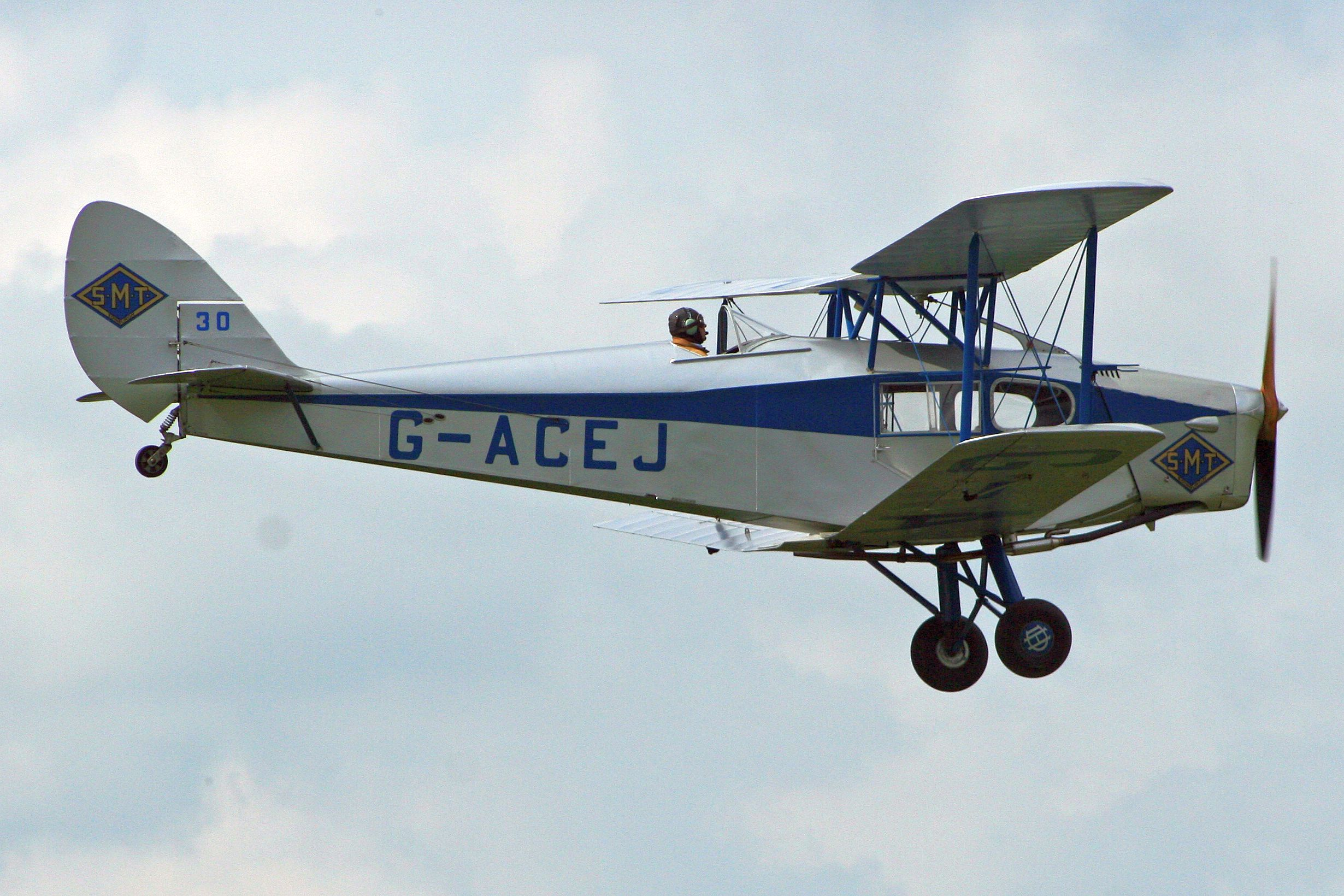
A DH.83 Fox Moth, the type used by Norman Edgar

On 26 September 1932, aircraft dealer Norman Wallace George Edgar started a twice-daily passenger service between Bristol (Whitchurch) Airport and Cardiff (Splott) Airport – a 20-minute trip in the De Havilland Fox Moth of his company, Norman Edgar & Co.. At that time a road journey between Bristol and Cardiff meant either crossing the Severn by the Aust Ferry, or a long detour upstream via Gloucester.

==== Norman Edgar (Western Airways) ====
Business boomed, and in September 1933 Edgar formed a new company, Norman Edgar (Western Airways) Ltd. at Whitchurch, with a larger aircraft, a De Havilland Dragon. New routes were added, across the English Channel to Le Touquet and Paris, and also to Cardiff and Bournemouth (Christchurch), as that airport's first airline service. Further Dragons were added to the fleet, and Edgar decided to look for a new base.

In January 1933 Edgar approached the council of Weston-super-Mare to finance the construction of a new airfield. Convinced, the council bought the land and construction started in February 1936. Edgar's company started two new ventures: Western Air Transport whose role was 'to operate airlines', and Airways Union, to 'establish lines of aerial connection'. Airways Union appears to have been a holding company for all of the planned activities. Western Airways was to manage the new Weston-super-Mare Airport for a fee that would help to mitigate the landing and per-passenger fees charged by the council to recover its large investment. In May, the new airport was licensed for De Havilland Dragon flights and, to Edgar's dismay, Railway Air Services started flights on two routes the same month, one to Cardiff and Whitchurch, and another via Cardiff and Haldon, Devon, to Plymouth (Roborough) Airport.

With the help of good publicity, Edgar soon responded with the Weston to Cardiff 'air ferry', another between Weston and Whitchurch, and a route to Birmingham (Castle Bromwich). By the end of July 1936 the company had relocated to Weston and the fleet had expanded to four Dragons, plus two De Havilland Puss Moths and a Gipsy Moth available for charter and pleasure flights. To Edgar's great relief, Railway Air Services withdrew all its services from Weston on 12 September, leaving his company with no competition.

In 1937 the company started Western Airways Aero Club, teaching many pupils to fly. Edgar also gained a contract with the Army for night flying for anti-aircraft practice. This meant equipping Weston Airport with lighting, including floodlights, and a control tower. Many of the company's aircraft were fitted with radios, and operations got underway by the end of April.

At first, aircraft engineering and maintenance had been performed by outside contractors in a hangar at Weston. With the growth of activity, it was decided to do this work in-house and in October 1937 an ex British Airways chief engineer, Freddy Jeans, was hired to oversee this work. An Air Training School was started by Western Airways to train engineers to work there.

Up to now, despite all its activity, the airline had failed to make a profit. On 10 July 1937, Louis Strange, a director of Straight Corporation, diverted to Weston during the annual air race from London (Heston) to Cardiff (Pengam Moors, which had been renamed from Splott). Seeing all the activity at Weston may have had an influence on the Straight management, who intended to get into the airline business, and in January 1938 the Straight Corporation bought a controlling share in Norman Edgar (Western Airways). It was then operating the highest frequency of flights of any airline in the world: 58 services a day. At the same time, Western Air Transport was renamed Straghtways Ltd.

On 10 August 1938, Norman Edgar left the company in some acrimony after he alleged that some of its pilots were flying while drunk. An unfair dismissal claim ran on into 1940. (Note: Edgar went on to work in the Air Transport Auxiliary (ATA), going to the USA to recruit women pilots for the organisation. In 1946 he became a vice president of Helicopter Air Transport Inc., the world's first commercial helicopter operator. He died in Nova Scotia, Canada in 1983.) Norman Edgar (Western Airways) was renamed Western Airways Ltd. on 18 October 1938.

=== Western Airways ===
With airport lighting in place for the Army contract, the airline wanted to start night passenger operations, principally for the Cardiff air ferry route. The Air Ministry demanded further work, mainly the lighting of nearby electricity pylons and the cables between them. All four runways were also lengthened, and once the work at Weston and Pengam Moors had been approved, the first British commercial night service began. The event, on 2 October 1938, was covered live by BBC reporters, and famous aviators Arthur Whitten Brown and Jim Mollison were at Cardiff to meet the incoming Rapide.

Routes in 1938

Weston – Cardiff (Pengam Moors Airport)
Bristol – Cardiff – Swansea (Jersey Marine Airport)
Swansea – Barnstaple – Newquay (Trebelzue airfield) – Penzance
Swansea – Weston
Weston – Bristol – Birmingham (Castle Bromwich) – Manchester (Barton airport, moving to Ringway)
Weston – Le Touquet – Paris (Le Bourget)

Routes in 1939

Weston – Cardiff – Swansea: Until 30 April, four times weekly.
Weston – Cardiff: Until 4 March, five times daily; 5 March to 15 April, six times daily; 16 to 30 April, seven times daily; 1 to 31 May, twenty-eight times daily; 1 to 30 June, twenty-five times daily; from 1 July, twenty-six times daily.
Bristol – Cardiff – Swansea: From 1 May, five times daily.
Swansea – Barnstaple: From 8 May, twice daily.
Swansea – Barnstaple – Newquay – Penzance: From 8 May, once daily.
Weston – Bristol – Birmingham (Elmdon) – Manchester (Ringway): From 17 June, three times daily.

To service these routes, a DH.86 Express and two Percival Q.6 airliners were acquired, offering greater capacity and, with the Q6s, greater speed, than the airline's existing fleet.

==== World War II ====
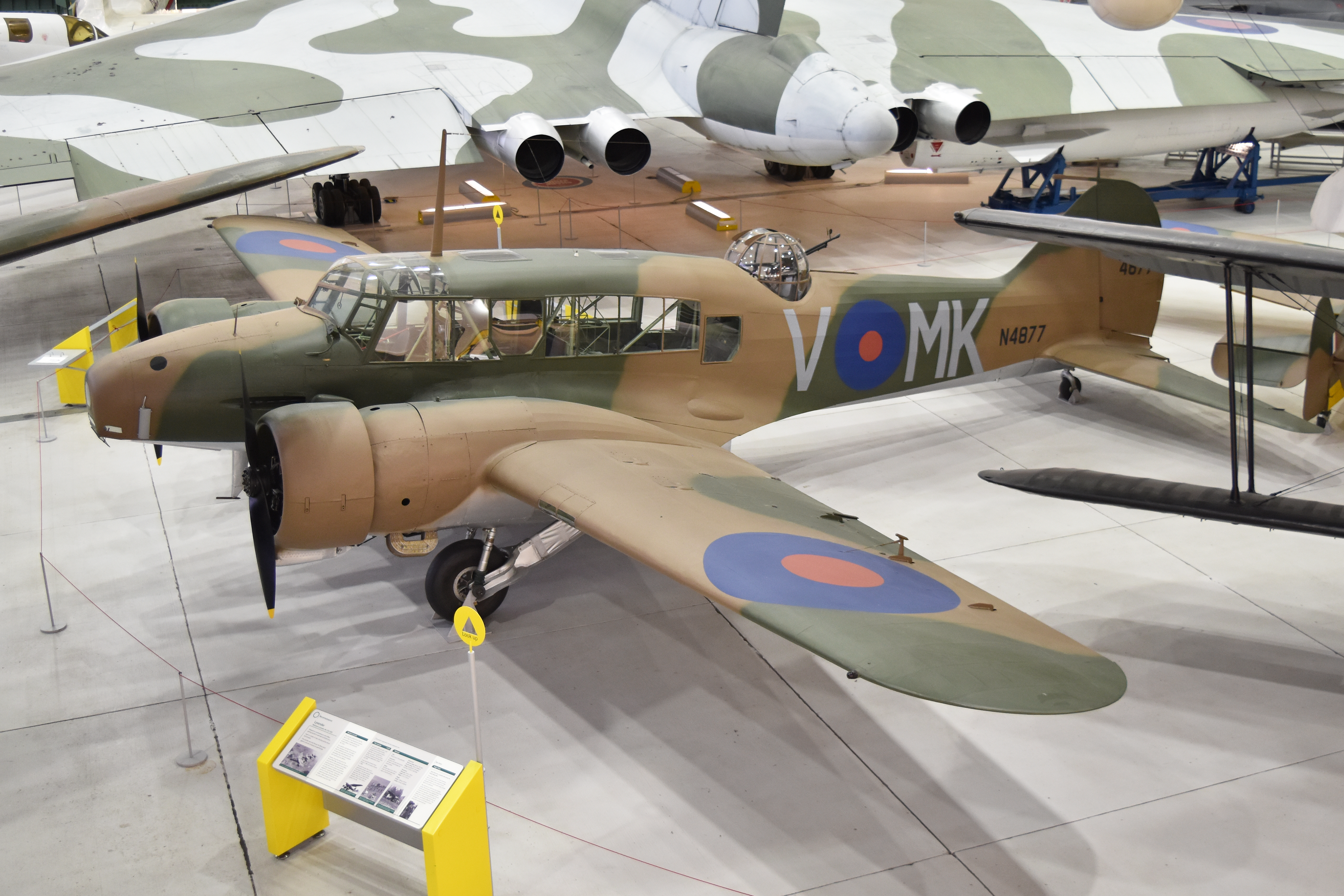
This Avro Anson I, N4877, was one of many worked on by Western Airways for the RAF during WWII.

On 3 September 1939, war with Germany was declared and the National Air Communications (NAC) organisation came into action. All British aerodromes and civil transport aircraft were requisitioned and most of the aircraft were flown to RAF bases. Western's DH.86 Express had been parked through lack of spares, but was overhauled and soon converted to an air ambulance. The NAC was persuaded to allow the Weston – Cardiff air shuttle to resume, but it only operated, on an hourly schedule, from 25 November until 30 March 1940. This was the last day of Western Airways' pre-war airline operations, but not the end of the company itself.

The maintenance facilities were expanding rapidly with work to repair, maintain and modify a wide range of aircraft, ranging from Miles Magisters to Curtiss Tomahawks, Avro Ansons and Fairey Battles. This work, mainly under contract to the Civilian Repair Organisation, continued until the end of the war, during which time the airfield had been greatly expanded, hard runways laid, and the Bristol Aeroplane Company had established a huge presence at Weston Airport.

==== Post-war diversification ====
Western Airways had done subcontracting work for Bristol, and after the war was producing components for their aircraft, such as for the Type 170 Freighter. It already had a contract for Royal Canadian Air Force Canadair Sabres, and to this was added component work on the Britannia airliner. They also refurbished a wide range of military vehicles, many for export, and Slingsby gliders, which led to them being appointed dealers for Slingsby Sailplanes and Percival Aircraft, a business that lasted into the early 1950s.

Another post-war activity was the conversion of military aircraft for civilian use. At first, the aircraft were from the old Straight Corporation fleet which had been impressed for war service; these were restored to their old registrations and sold on. A wide range of aircraft types were then worked on, including Avro Tutor, Supermarine Walrus, Percival Petrel (military Q6), Taylorcraft and Miles. Eight Ansons were converted for the corporation's Straight Aviation Training, and two more were retained as civilian conversions with seven passenger seats and used for communications and charter work. Other Ansons were converted for other, mainly military, customers.

Western Airways' airline operations restarted in July 1946, when the Ministry of Civil Aviation permitted services on the Weston – Cardiff air ferry route. At first, Western operated the route alone, but the following year the ministry dictated that it had to be operated in conjunction with Cambrian Airways. On 25 May, 1948, a BEA Associate Agreement for flights between Weston and Cardiff, flown in association with Cambrian Airways, became operational. Western used its Avro Ansons, while Cambrian used Rapides which they had acquired specially for the route. The service only lasted until the end of the 1949 holiday season, when Western withdrew, Cambrian carrying on for a few weeks, finally stopping on 29 October.

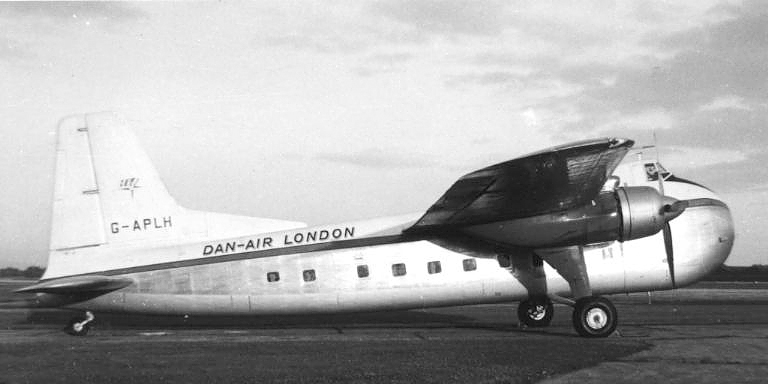
Bristol Freighter Mk 31 G-APLH of Dan-Air at Manchester in 1958.

All airline-type operations were halted in 1952 and Western Airways again concentrated on its parts manufacturing operations. Starting with orders for components for the Westland Wyvern and De Havilland Vampire, they started on parts for the Bristol 170 Freighter. This soon led to a Freighter production line being created in one of Western Airways' hangars. The first one was rolled out on 28 September 1953, the last on 23 March 1958. In total, 31 were built by Western Airways. With many Freighters used for intense English Channel car ferry operations, stresses on the airframe were high, and Western Airways got considerable business replacing components in the wing's main spar for many years after production finished. More work was obtained for Bristol, the next major project being the completion of the Britannia, two of which could just be squeezed into Western's hangar. Again Western Airlines got further repair and parts replacement work from that aircraft.

Other work also came in, and during the 1960s work on Concorde and the Rolls-Royce RB211 engine was done. However, the company had already started to diversify, and in 1958 a hangar was taken over by a company soon to be called Barber Weston Ltd, whose director, Arthur A Barber, became a director of Western Airways and its holding company, Airways Union. Barber manufactured a range of products including conveyor systems, wheelchairs, vending machines, and prefabricated steel-frame buildings, many of which were bought by the Little Chef restaurant chain. (Note: After the closure of Western Airways, this company, renamed RJ Mobility, continued, making wheelchairs for the National Health Service.)

Another subsidiary was created, Straghtaways Ltd, taking its name from the Straight Corporation's pre-war house magazine. On the Weston Airport site it made prams and push-chairs for Mothercare along with chicken cages and electrically heated clothes driers.

In the early 1970s, Western Airways had a contract to weld the fuselages of autogyros to be produced for Campbell Aircraft, and were contracted to build the prototype of a new version, the Campbell Cougar. It was completed in 1973 and flight testing went well. However, Campbell's funding ran out and the whole project was abandoned, the Cougar moving to The Helicopter Museum, built on the site of Weston Airport's control tower.

Western Airways continued to operate Weston Airport and serviced and maintained a number of private aircraft. Pleasure flights were still popular, and for a short while in the 1976 season, famous ATA pilot Jackie Moggridge was employed as a pilot. However, during the 1970s the level of activity was declining, and the runway was in need of costly resurfacing. Airways Union decided to relinquish the airport's licence at the end of 1978, and the remaining staff were made redundant.

== Fleet list (pre-war airline use only) ==
After the takeover by the Straight Corporation, aircraft were moved between their different airlines, airport operating companies, and flying clubs as the need arose. Therefore aircraft listed here probably didn't spend their entire career with Western before disposal, and some Straight Corporation aircraft not listed here may have operated for Western Airways.

De Havilland DH.83 Fox Moth
G-ABYO Norman Edgar from September 1932 to 16 June 1934 (crashed)
De Havilland DH.84 Dragon
G-ACAO from 8 July 1938, impressed 2 April 1940 as N9398
G-ACJT from 26 August 1933 to 20 December 1939 (crashed)
G-ACLE from 18 May 1939, impressed 2 April 1940 as X9397
G-ACMJ from 1 July 1938, impressed 2 April 1940 as X9396
G-ACPX from 23 July 1938, impressed 2 April 1940 as X9399
G-AECZ from 1 February 1937, impressed 8 May 1940 as AV982
De Havilland DH.86B Express
G-AETM from 18 April 1939 to 31 January 1940
De Havilland DH.89 Dragon Rapide
G-ACTU from 14 July 1937, impressed 8 June 1940 as AW115
G-ADBV from 31 May 1937, impressed 2 March 1940 as N8511
G-ADDD from 8 July 1937, impressed 4 June 1940 as AW116
G-AFSO (DH.89A) from 21 May 1939, impressed 23 January 1940 as W6457
De Havilland DH.90 Dragonfly
G-ADNA from 27 January 1939, impressed 17 April 1940 as X9452
G-AEDH from 25 September 1937, impressed 10 May 1940 as AV987
General Aircraft ST-6 Monospar
G-ACGI from 6 November 1936, impressed 6 May 1940 as AV979
Percival Q.6
G-AFIX from April 1939, impressed 2 April 1940 as X9406
G-AFVC from 30 June 1939, impressed 10 May 1940 as AX860
Short S.16 Scion
G-ADDV from 22 May 1936, impressed 11 April 1940 as X9456
G-ADDX from 15 May 1936, impressed 3 April 1940 as X9430
Spartan Cruiser II
G-ACBM from 28 July 1937 to August 1937 (scrapped)

== Aircraft production ==
Bristol Type 170 Freighter
Mk 31 (1953–1958)

F-VNAR Air Vietnam
G-APLH Dan-Air
ZK-BVM Safe Air

Total = 3

Mk 31M (1954–1957)

S4408 Royal Pakistan Air Force (RPAF)
S4410 RPAF
S4413 RPAF
S4415 RPAF
S4417 RPAF
S4419 RPAF
S4421 RPAF
S4422 RPAF
S4424 RPAF
S4426 RPAF
S4427 RPAF
S4429 RPAF
S4430 RPAF
S4432 RPAF
S4433 RPAF
S4435 RPAF
S4437 RPAF
S4438 RPAF
9850 Royal Canadian Air Force

Total = 19

Mk 32 Superfreighter (1956–1957)

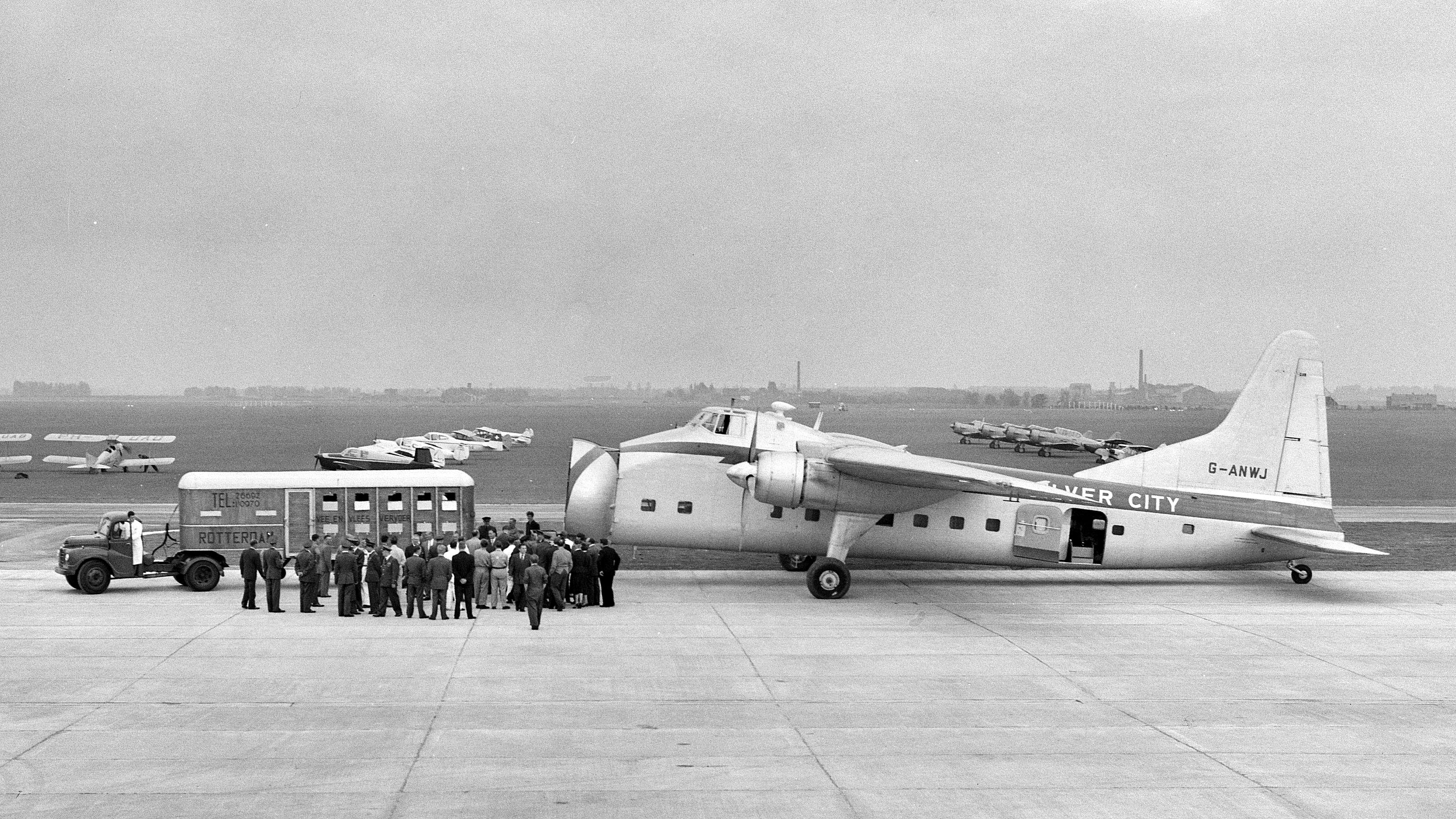
Bristol Freighter Mk 32 G-ANWJ of Silver City Airways at Rotterdam Zestienhoven Airport, 1956

G-ANWJ Silver City
G-APAU Air Charter
G-AOUU Air Charter
G-AOUV Air Charter
G-ANWK Silver City
G-ANWL Silver City
G-ANWM Silver City
G-ANWN Silver City
G-APAV Air Charter

Total = 9

Total Freighter production = 31

Campbell Cougar

G-BAPS. first flight 20 April 1973

== Accidents and incidents ==
1. On 16 June 1934 De Havilland Fox Moth G-ABYO of Norman Edgar & Co was on a business charter flight from Llanvair, near Caerwent in Wales to Glasgow when the aircraft crashed near Llanvair and caught fire. The pilot, Douglas Brecknell, was thrown clear and rescued his two trapped passengers. One of the passengers, Godfrey Jones, survived with injuries, but the other, Arthur Turner, aged 41, died later of his injuries.
2. On 20 December 1939 De Havilland Dragon G-ACJT registered to Southern Airways (part of the Straight Corporation) crashed on take-off at Weston Airport on a flight to Cardiff. It is thought the pilot, Leslie Ivor Arnott, aged 35, the sole occupant, had become incapacitated. He died in hospital of his injuries.

== Bibliography ==
- Simons, Graham M. (1988). Western Airways the West Country Airline. Bristol: Redcliffe Press Ltd. ISBN 0948265728.
