= RAF Weston-super-Mare =

Former Royal Air Force station in Somerset, England

RAF Weston-super-Mare
- Weston-super-Mare, Somerset in England
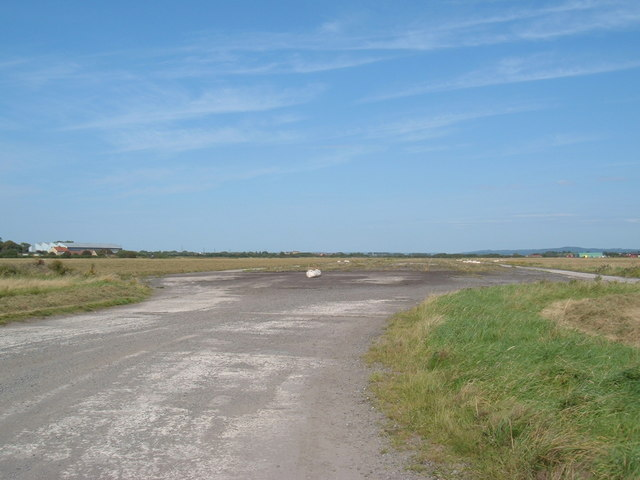
- The main runway photographed in 2007

Site information
- Owner: Air Ministry
- Operator: Royal Air Force
- Controlled by: RAF Flying Training Command

Location
- Shown within Somerset
- Coordinates: 51°20′07″N 2°56′28″W

Site history
- Built: 1936
- In use: 1936-1988
- Battles/wars: Second World War

Airfield information
Runways
Direction	Length and surface
00/00	Concrete
00/00	Grass
00/00	Grass

Royal Air Force Weston-super-Mare, or more simply RAF Weston-super-Mare, is a former Royal Air Force station which was located on a civilian airfield in Weston-super-Mare, Somerset, England.

It was set up as a municipal civilian airport in the 1930s before being taken over by the RAF in the Second World War for training and technical services. It was also the site of an aircraft production facility. In the postwar period it was used by Westland Helicopters. It is now home to the Helicopter Museum and a housing estate.

== First airport ==
The airport was started by Weston-super-Mare Urban District Council in the 1930s. Sir Alan Cobham had encouraged local authorities to build airfields as part of his 'Municipal Aerodromes Scheme' in the late 1920s. In May 1936, scheduled air services were started by Railway Air Services using the de Havilland Dragon and de Havilland Express to fly from Plymouth to Haldon, then across the Bristol Channel to Cardiff Municipal Airport before recrossing the Bristol Channel to Weston and then flying on to Bristol (Whitchurch) Airport. The distance from Cardiff to Weston is less than 20 kilometres (12 mi) across the water, however the road journey would have been around 150 kilometres (93 mi) or a trip on the Aust Ferry before the Severn Bridge opened in 1966, although the Severn Tunnel enabled rail travel between South Gloucestershire and South Wales.

By 1938, a passenger terminal and administration building had been completed, along with a side opening hangar, and Western Airways started services using de Havilland Dragon Rapides and a de Havilland Dragonfly, for a scheduled service via Birmingham to Manchester. On 18 October 1938 the Straight Corporation, headed by Whitney Straight purchased control of Norman Edgar (Western Airways) Ltd. and renamed it Western Airways, Ltd.

== RAF use ==
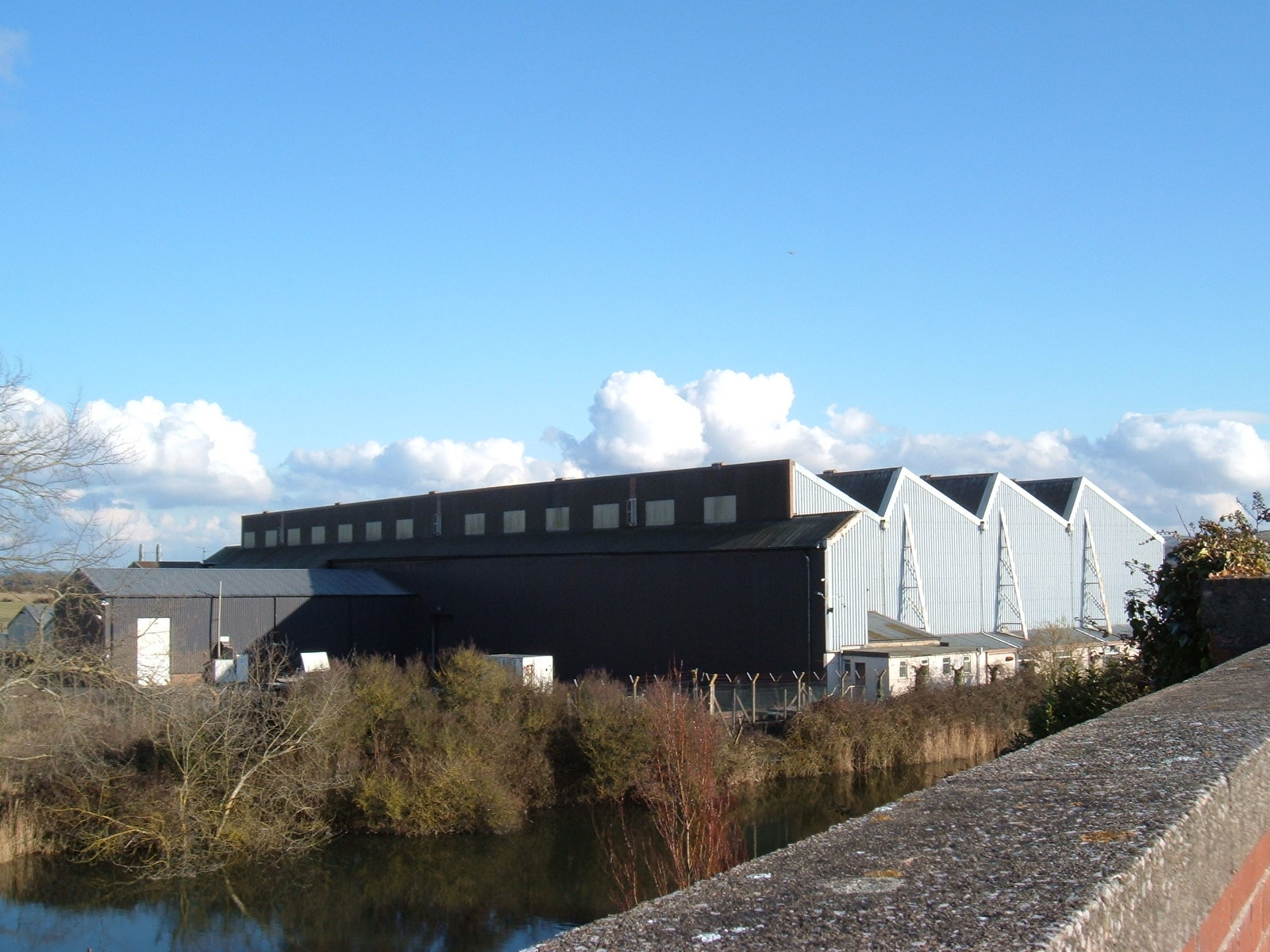
Old aircraft hangar, later used as a factory

On 2 January 1939, the Royal Air Force opened a School of Technical Training at RAF Locking, that did not have an airfield, but was only a mile from the Weston-super-Mare site. This was followed in 1939 by the establishment of No. 39 Elementary and Reserve Flying Training School RAF (ERFTS) at the airport, using Miles Magisters and the Audax and Hind variants of the Hawker Hart. In September 1939, the No. 39 ERFTS was disbanded and replaced by the No. 5 Civil Air Navigation School RAF (CANS); both were run by the Straight Corporation, until the RAF took it over and renamed it No. 5 Air Observers Navigation School RAF and, in 1940, transferred to Oudtshoorn, South Africa, and were replaced by No. 10 Elementary and Reserve Flying Training School RAF.

On 1 May 1940, the RAF formally took over the airfield, and a main runway of 4,197 feet (1,279 m) was laid, with shorter runways of 2,950 feet (900 m) and 2,260 feet (690 m) on the grass. On the west of the airfield at Oldmixon, a factory was built by the Ministry of Aircraft Production to manufacture the Bristol Beaufighter, that were then flown out of the airfield. A Q-decoy site was set up at Bleadon, in an attempt to protect the factory from bombing by the Luftwaffe.

In October 1942, it became the headquarters of No. 286 Squadron RAF that operated a variety of aircraft, including Hawker Hurricanes, Boulton Paul Defiants and Airspeed Oxfords, to provide targets for anti-aircraft gun practice in the west country of England. 286 Squadron was replaced in November 1943 by a detachment of No. 116 Squadron RAF its main task was the calibration of predictors and AA radar used by numerous Anti-aircraft batteries in the UK. In March 1944, an Aircraft Torpedo Development Unit was added, that used ranges in the Bristol Channel for testing, and stayed at Weston until 1949.

It was latterly as the Polish Air Force Staff College from April 1944 to April 1946.

== Postwar use ==
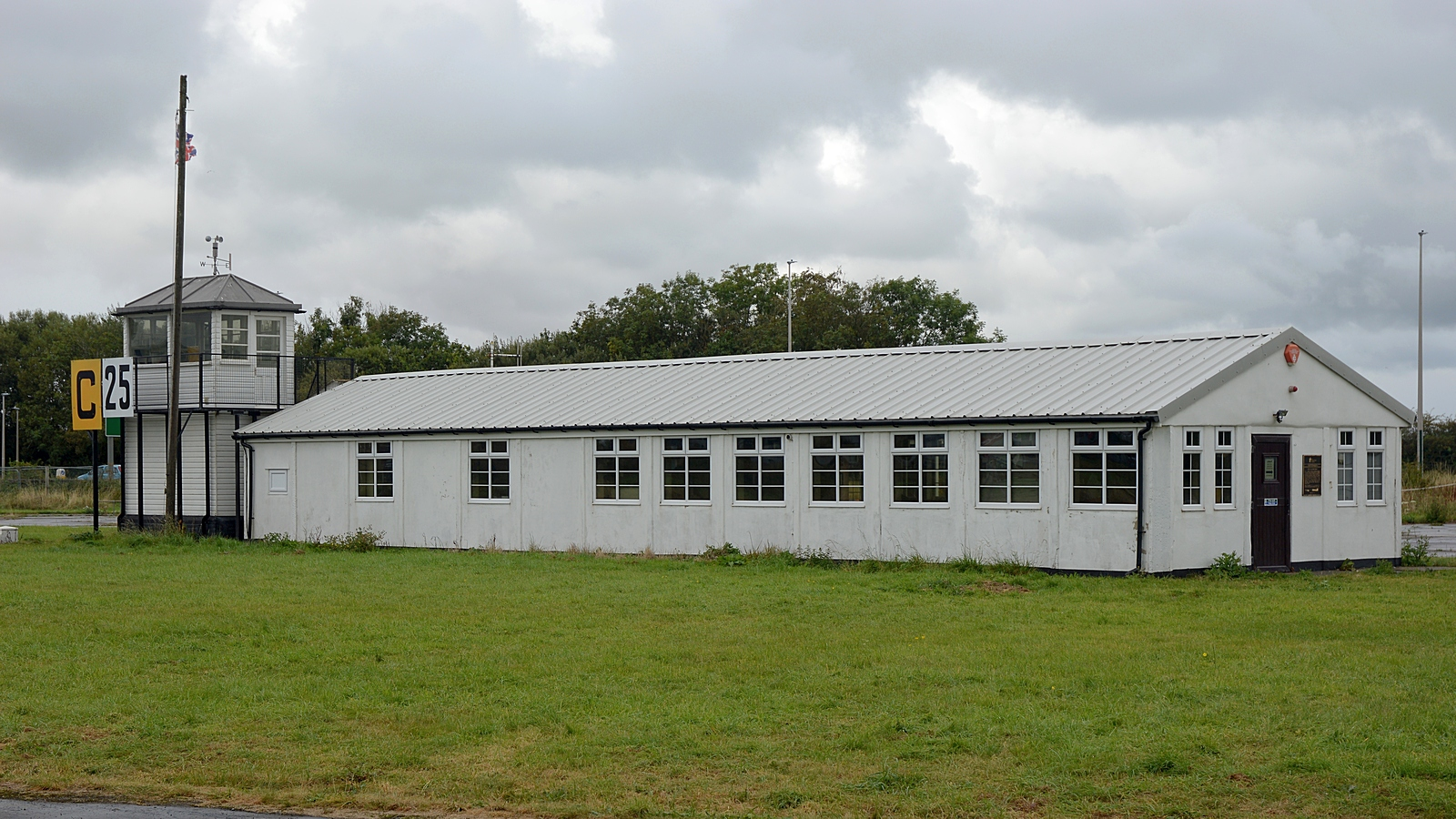
The restored airfield control tower and pilots' block. The top half of the tower was previously a cab shelter on Weston seafront. The pilots' block now houses the Weston Aviation Exhibition of the airfield's history

RAF training in conjunction with RAF Locking continued after the Second World War, but also civilian flights resumed. During and after the war, the engineering division of Western Airways repaired and maintained many types of military aircraft, and extended this into parts manufacturing. This led to them building aircraft on their own production line, and between 1953 and 1958, 31 Bristol Freighters were built.

In 1955, the old Beaufighter factory at Oldmixon was converted for use by the Bristol Aeroplane Company Helicopter Division, headed by helicopter pioneer Raoul Hafner, that transferred there from Filton. Production at the site included the Sycamore, that was the first British-designed helicopter to fly and serve with the Royal Air Force, that used it for search and rescue and anti-submarine warfare. The Belvedere followed, a twin-engine, tandem rotor military helicopter. It was designed for a variety of transport roles including troop transport, supply dropping and casualty evacuation. It was operated by the Royal Air Force from 1961 to 1969. In 1960, the factory was taken over by Westland, and served as a logistics supply station, until closure in 1987.

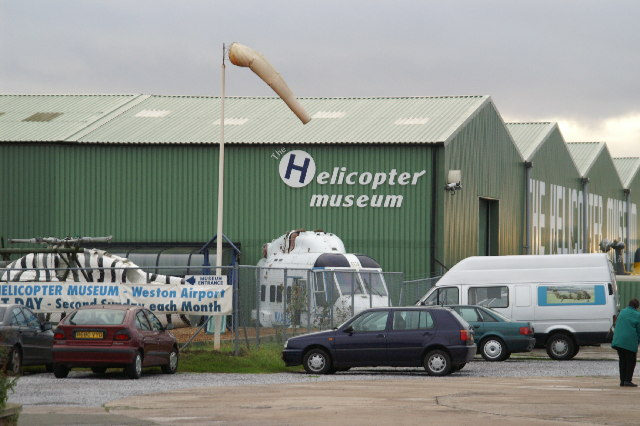
The Helicopter Museum

The airfield was the home to No. 87 Glider Squadron (87 GS), that had been set up at Weston in 1943, and later became No. 621 Volunteer Gliding Squadron (621 VGS) staying at the site until 1993, when it moved to RAF Hullavington. Today there is an operational heliport on site, used occasionally by the RAF Search and Rescue service and other civil and military visiting helicopters.

A corner of the airfield site houses The Helicopter Museum that took over part of the site in 1978 including a Second World War armoury building and air-raid shelter. The main part of the site passed into the ownership of Persimmon Homes and in 2011 a housing development, to be named Winterstoke Village after the Hundred of Winterstoke, was proposed, with associated areas for new employment opportunities.

On 6 September 2012 construction machinery moved in and began building a new road on the line of the main runway, with a roundabout to give access from the A371 Locking Moor Road.

== Accidents and incidents ==
On 22 November 1946 a Royal Air Force twin-engined Douglas Boston bomber hit and ripped the top off a bus with its landing gear as it was on approach to the airfield. The bus was the middle one of three taking 57 airmen from nearby RAF Locking to Weston-super-mare railway station. Seven airman were killed at the scene and one died later, four others were seriously hurt. The aircraft crash landed on the airfield and the crew of three were not injured.

On Wednesday 7 July 1948 de Havilland Sea Mosquito TR.33 TW284 of the Air Torpedo Development Unit at RAF Gosport in Hampshire was performing a slow roll around 400 or 500 feet when one of the wings failed and it crashed on the airfield killing the two RAF officers on board.

== See also ==
- Western Airways whose operations played an important role in the airfield's development.

== Bibliography ==
- Tillbrook, Ray (Editor). 1998. Over & Out: A History of Royal Air Force Locking. Forces & Corporate Publishing ISBN 0-9529597-3-9
- Dudley, Roger and Johnson, Ted. 2010. Weston Super Mare & the Aeroplane. Amberley Publishing ISBN 978-1-84868-221-4
- Sturtivant, Ray. 2004. Fleet Air Arm Fixed-Wing Aircraft since 1946. Air-Britain ISBN 0-85130 283 1
