= 559th Bombardment Squadron =

559th Bombardment Squadron (later 969th Airborne Warning and Control Squadron)
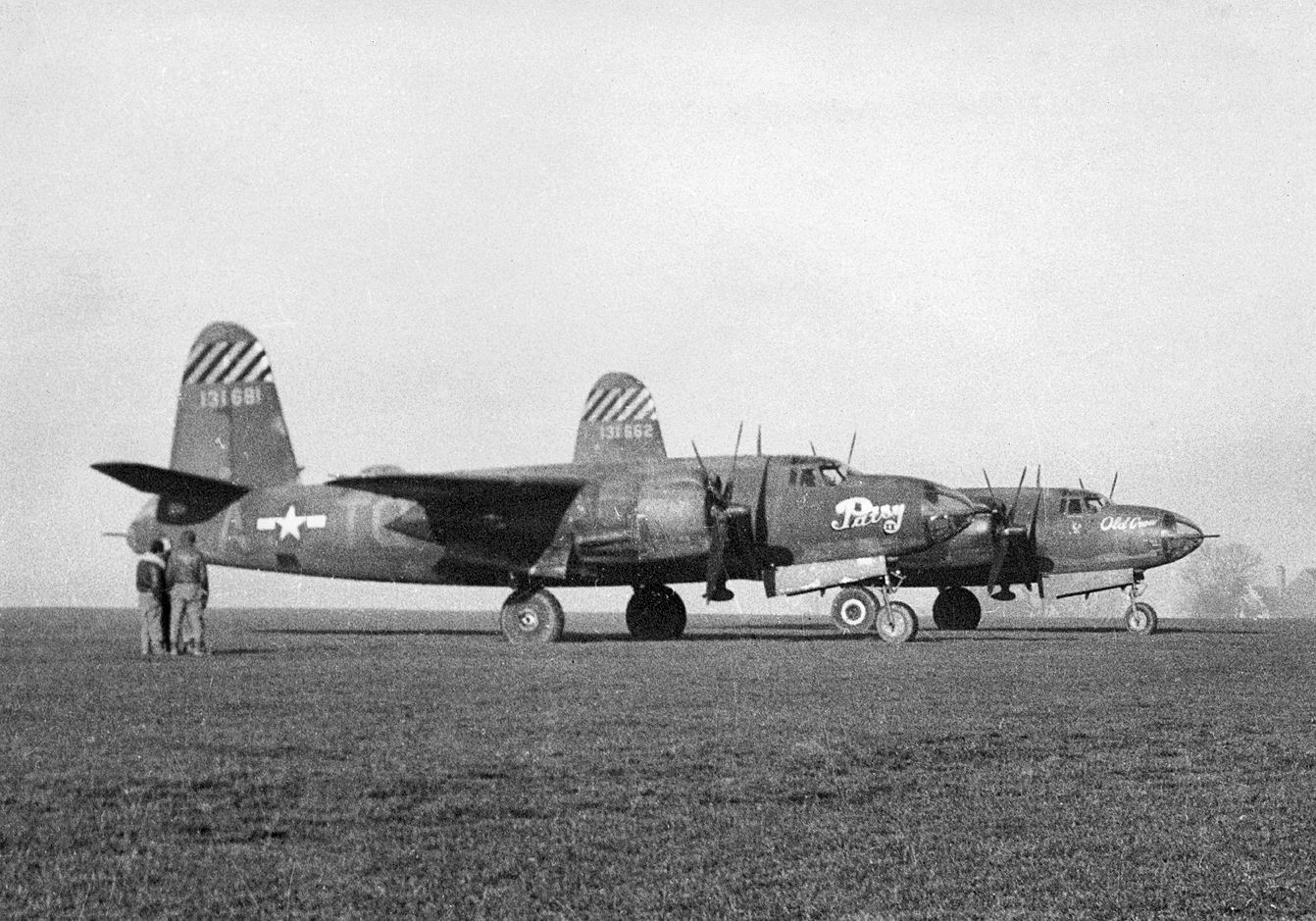
- 559th Squadron Martin B-26 Marauders (Note: Fog-bound Martin B-26B-20-MA Marauder, serial 41-31681, Patsy, fuselage code TQ-A (salvaged due to battle damage on 13 June 1944) and Martin B-26B-15-MA Marauder, serial 41-31662, Old Crow (destroyed when it crash landed in Belgium on 23 September 1944) at RAF Debden in January 1944. Baugher, Joe (1 April 2023). "1941 USAF Serial Numbers". Joe Baugher.)
- Active: 1942–1945; 1958–1961
- Country: United States
- Branch: United States Air Force
- Role: medium bomber
- Engagements: European Theater of Operations
- Decorations: Distinguished Unit Citation

Insignia
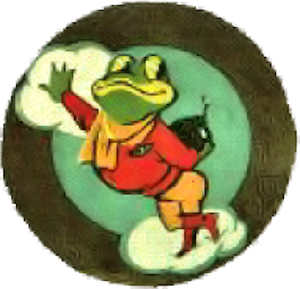
- 559th Bombardment Squadron emblem
- World War II fuselage code: TQ

The 969th Airborne Warning and Control Squadron is an inactive United States Air Force unit. It was formed in 1985 by the consolidation of the 559th and 659th Bombardment Squadrons.

The first predecessor of the squadron is the 559th Bombardment Squadron, which was organized in 1942 as a Martin B-26 Marauder unit. After training in the United States, it deployed to the European Theater of Operations, operating from England, and later from Advanced Landing Grounds on the European continent. The squadron was awarded the Distinguished Unit Citation for supporting beleaguered ground troops during the Battle of the Bulge. After V-E Day, the squadron returned to the United States and was inactivated at the port of embarkation, Camp Kilmer, New Jersey on 12 November 1945.

The squadron's second predecessor is the 659th Bombardment Squadron, which was formed in 1958 when Strategic Air Command expanded its Boeing B-47 Stratojet wings from three to four squadrons as they began to stand alert at their home stations. It was inactivated in 1961 when its parent unit began converting to the Boeing B-52 Stratofortress. The two squadrons were consolidated under their current name in September 1985, but the consolidated squadron has never been active.

== History ==
=== World War II ===
The 559th Bombardment Squadron was activated at MacDill Field, Florida, on 1 December 1942 as one of the four squadrons of the 387th Bombardment Group and trained at bases in the southeastern United States with Martin B-26 Marauder medium bombers until June 1943, when it deployed to the European Theater of Operations. The squadron's ground echelon departed for the port of embarkation on 10 June and sailed on the RMS Queen Mary on 23 June, while the air echelon ferried its Marauders to England via the northern ferrying route.

The squadron established itself at its first base in Europe, RAF Chipping Ongar at the beginning of July 1943. Although the squadron initially trained for low level attacks, VIII Air Support Command, in consultation with the Royal Air Force, decided to employ its B-26 units in attacks at medium altitude, mirroring a decision made earlier in the Mediterranean Theater of Operations. The squadron flew its first combat mission on 15 August, with initial operations focusing on German airfields near the coast of France, in an effort to force the Luftwaffe to withdraw its interceptors from the coastal belt, reducing their effectiveness against heavy bombers passing through on their way to strike targets deeper in occupied Europe. By early September, the squadron adopted a tactic first employed by the 386th Bombardment Group, where all bombers in a formation dropped their bombs based on the lead aircraft, rather than individually, to achieve a greater concentration of bombs on the intended target. September 1943 would prove the busiest while the squadron was part of Eighth Air Force as B-26s made heavy attacks on airfields and communications sites near Boulogne as part of Operation Starkey, an attempt to make the Germans believe an invasion of France was imminent. On 9 October 1943, the squadron flew what would prove to be the last B-26 mission flown by Eighth Air Force.

In October, Ninth Air Force moved to England to take over tactical operations operating from England, building on the core of B-26 units already there. During the winter of 1943–1944, the squadron made numerous attacks on V-1 flying bomb and V-2 rocket sites. During Big Week, the squadron attacked Leeuwarden and Venlo Airfields. In the spring of 1944, the squadron attacked coastal defenses and bridges prior to Operation Overlord, the invasion of Normandy. On D-Day, it attacked targets along the coast, and supported ground forces during June 1944 by attacking line of communication targets and fuel dumps. In late July, the squadron supported Operation Cobra, the breakout at Saint Lo. During August, it attacked German forces at Brest, France.

The squadron moved to France in September, when it began operations from Maupertuis Airfield. For the rest of the war, it operated from Advanced Landing Grounds in Europe; advancing eastward with Allied ground forces. Its operations from advanced fields permitted its first attacks directly on targets in Germany by the fall of 1944. During the Battle of the Bulge, it attacked strongly defended communications and transportation targets at Mayen and Pruem, for which it was awarded a Distinguished Unit Citation. It continued to support the Allied advance into Germany, flying its last combat mission in April 1945.

After V-E Day the squadron moved to Rosieres-en-Santerre Airfield, France, where it remained until returning to the United States for inactivation in November 1945.

=== Strategic Air Command ===
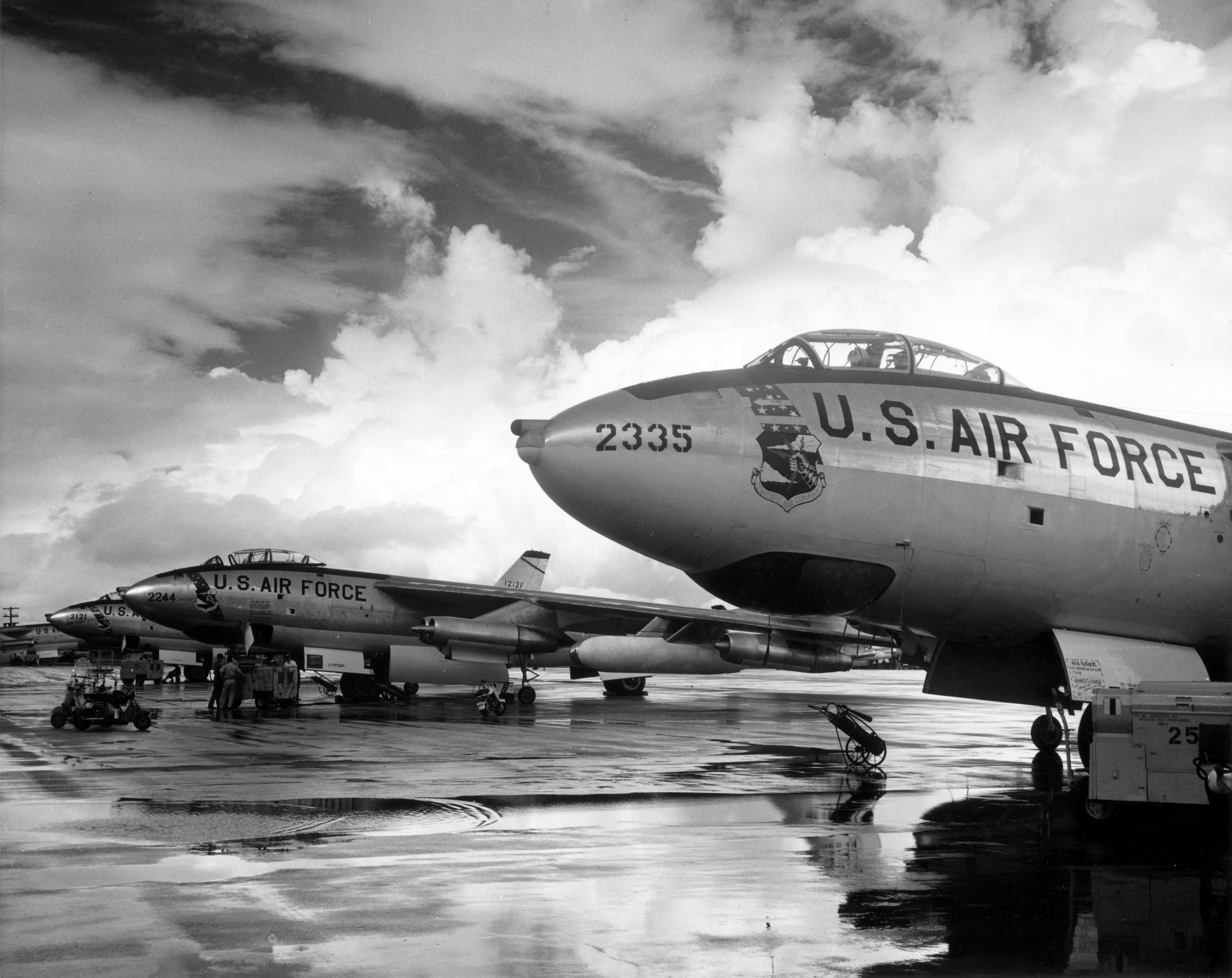
B-47s of Strategic Air Command

Starting in 1958, the Boeing B-47 Stratojet wings of Strategic Air Command (SAC) began to assume an alert posture at their home bases, reducing the amount of time spent on alert at overseas bases. The SAC alert cycle divided itself into four parts: planning, flying, alert and rest to meet General Thomas S. Power’s initial goal of maintaining one third of SAC's planes on fifteen minute ground alert, fully fueled and ready for combat to reduce vulnerability to a Soviet missile strike. To implement this new system, B-47 wings reorganized from three to four squadrons. The 659th Bombardment Squadron was activated at Homestead Air Force Base, Florida as the fourth squadron of the 19th Bombardment Wing on 1 November 1958. The 19th Wing began converting to the Boeing B-52 Stratofortress bomber in 1961 and the squadron was inactivated on 1 July.

=== Consolidation ===
In September 1985, the 559th Bombardment Squadron and the 659th Bombardment Squadron were consolidated as the 969th Airborne Warning and Control Squadron.

== Lineage ==
559th Bombardment Squadron

- Constituted as the 559th Bombardment Squadron (Medium) on 25 November 1942

Activated on 1 December 1942
Redesignated 559th Bombardment Squadron, Medium on 9 October 1944
Inactivated on 12 November 1945

- Consolidated with the 659th Bombardment Squadron as the 969th Airborne Warning and Control Squadron on 15 September 1985

659th Bombardment Squadron

- Constituted as the 659th Bombardment Squadron, Medium

Activated on 1 November 1958
Inactivated on 1 June 1961

- Consolidated with the 559th Bombardment Squadron as the 969th Airborne Warning and Control Squadron on 15 September 1985

=== Assignments ===
- 387th Bombardment Group, 1 December 1942 – 12 November 1945
- 19th Bombardment Wing: 1 November 1958 – 1 June 1961

=== Stations ===
- MacDill Field, Florida, 1 December 1942
- Drane Field, Florida, 12 April 1943
- Godman Field, Kentucky, 12 May–10 June 1943
- RAF Chipping Ongar (AAF-162), England, 1 July 1943
- RAF Stoney Cross (AAF-452), England, c. 21 July 1944
- Maupertuis Airfield (A-15), France, c. 1 September 1944
- Chateaudun Airfield (A-39), France, c. 18 September 1944
- Clastres Airfield (A-71), France, c. 4 November 1944
- Maastricht Airfield (Y-44), Netherlands, c. 4 May 1945
- Rosieres-en-Santerre Airfield (B-87), France, 30 May–c. November 1945
- Camp Kilmer, New Jersey, 11–12 November 1945
- Homestead Air Force Base, Florida, 1 November 1958 - 1 June 1961

=== Aircraft ===
- Martin B-26 Marauder, 1942–1945
- Boeing B-47 Stratojet

=== Awards and campaigns ===
| Award streamer | Award | Dates | Notes |
|---|---|---|---|
| | Presidential Unit Citation | Germany 23 December 1944 | 559th Bombardment Squadron |

| Campaign Streamer | Campaign | Dates | Notes |
|---|---|---|---|
| | Air Offensive, Europe | 1 July 1943 – 5 June 1944 | 559th Bombardment Squadron |
| | Normandy | 6 June 1944 – 24 July 1944 | 559th Bombardment Squadron |
| | Northern France | 25 July 1944 – 14 September 1944 | 559th Bombardment Squadron |
| | Rhineland | 15 September 1944 – 21 March 1945 | 559th Bombardment Squadron |
| | Ardennes-Alsace | 16 December 1944 – 25 January 1945 | 559th Bombardment Squadron |
| | Central Europe | 22 March 1944 – 21 May 1945 | 559th Bombardment Squadron |
