= Straight Corporation =

British aviation company (1935 – 1989)

Straight Corporation Ltd
- Type: Private
- Industry: Aviation: Airlines; Airports; Training; Aircraft engineering
- Founded: April 17, 1935; 91 years ago in London, UK
- Founder: Whitney Straight
- Defunct: 1989
- Fate: Dissolved
- Headquarters: London, England
- Key people: Whitney Straight; William Parkhouse

The Straight Corporation Ltd was a significant operator of British airlines, airports and flying clubs from 1935 until the mid-1970s. Its major unit, Western Airways, expanded to become an important parts manufacturer, a maintenance, repair and upgrade organisation, and a builder of transport aircraft.

== Foundation ==
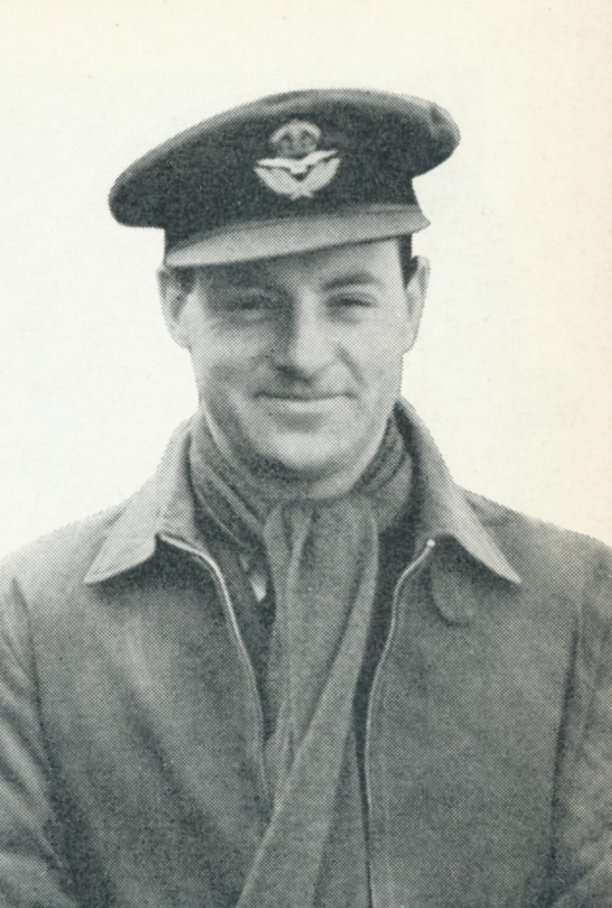
Whitney Straight

Whitney Willard Straight was a successful racing driver in the early 1930s, but his American millionaire mother and English step-father, Dorothy and Leonard Elmhirst, were concerned for his safety and sought a less dangerous occupation for him, especially as he was about to marry. At a dinner at their home, Dartington Hall in Devon, they discussed this with William (Bill) Parkhouse, who was the owner of a local auto engineering company, and founder of Haldon Airfield, where Straight had learned to fly a few years earlier.

Parkhouse had been concerned that smaller airports, such as Exeter and Torquay, with which he was also involved, and smaller airlines, were too small to survive on their own, and he proposed that a holding company operating many such ventures would be able to achieve economies of scale and be able to use resources much more efficiently, sharing them as needed. Straight was summoned the next day, and readily agreed to found the venture, so on 17 April 1935 Straight Corporation was born, and Straight gave up motor racing.

The corporation was funded by Straight's own trust, with the objective of controlling up to 15 municipal airports, with first-class terminals, restaurants and flight training facilities. The headquarters were at 17 Manchester Square, London W.1.

Straight recruited several friends as directors in his corporation. These included Bill Parkhouse; Louis Strange; Richard Seaman, a fellow racing driver whom he had met while they were both at Cambridge University; and Straight's solicitor, Frederick A.S. Gwatkin. Both Seaman and Gwatkin invested in the company. Company secretary was Stanley John Cox, who would also be the secretary of most of the corporation's subsidiary companies. Many of the corporation's aircraft would be initially registered in the name of Richard Seaman. Straight also recruited Mary De Bunsen who carried out public relations and was responsible for the house magazine, Straightaway, intended for staff and club members.

The progress and growth of the corporation went on unabated as detailed below, and the expansion became even faster at the airports with the demand for aircrew training in the two years before World War II. When the war came, however, all private flying, including that by clubs and airlines, was prohibited except under licence, and almost all the corporation's activities stopped.

== Airlines ==
=== Southern Airways Ltd ===
This was a new company, registered at Straight Corporation headquarters in Manchester Square, London and its main operating base was Ramsgate Airport. It was mainly concerned with pleasure, charter and army co-operation flights, but also ran scheduled services along the Thames Estuary. Its fleet varied depending on its needs and those of the other of Straight Corporation companies, sometimes operating aircraft registered to them, and sometimes lending their aircraft to them. Several aircraft were at first registered to Richard Seaman, possibly reflecting his investment in the corporation. The larger aircraft most often used by Southern Airways included:

Fleet

General Aircraft ST-6 Monospar
G-ACGI from 6 November 1936, impressed 6 May 1940 as AV979
Short S.16 Scion
G-ADDV from 22 May 1936, impressed 11 April 1940 as X9456
G-ADDX from 15 May 1936, impressed 3 April 1940 as X9430
Spartan Cruiser II
G-ACBM from 28 July 1937 to August 1937

Routes

Ipswich — Clacton
Ramsgate — Ilford (London) (Note: There is confusion about exactly which airport was served by Southern at Ilford, as there appear to have been four different airfields next to each other. The most likely is the one named Chigwell, which seems to have only operated from 1938 to 1939.)
Ilford — Ramsgate — Clacton — Ipswich with a request stop at Southend

All Southern Airways activities stopped with the outbreak of World War II in September 1939.

=== Western Airways Ltd ===
In January 1938 Straight Corporation bought a controlling share in Norman Edgar (Western Airways) Ltd, renaming it Western Airways Ltd. At that time it was operating the highest frequency of flights of any airline in the world, with 58 services a day on the Weston — Cardiff route alone.

The airline prospered and expanded its fleet and routes, and developed a strong engineering capability, which enabled it to survive WWII. It carried this on after the war, even building Bristol Freighters. Activity then started to wind down and the company was wound up in 1978.

== Airports ==
The corporation set out to operate a large chain of civil airports. Some were bought outright, some leased, and some managed on behalf of the owners. All were run by a local operating company, and aero clubs were established or taken over at most airports. In addition to the locations listed below, attempts to lease Norwich Airport, Stoke-on-Trent Meir airfield and Cardiff's Pengam Moors airport were rejected.

Aircraft were owned by the airport operating company or the associated flying clubs, and were occasionally registered in the names of officials of the local organisations. They were used for charter, pleasure, training or army co-operation support flights as required, and were also often transferred between different Straight-operated airports, clubs or airlines as needs arose.

Many airports took part in the Civil Air Guard (CAG) scheme which started 1 September 1938. When the scheme began there were 1,299 applications to train at Straight Corporation-operated CAG airports. Extra Hornet Moths were acquired for this, and Straight's CAG courses started on 1 October. In 1939 Elementary and Reserve Flying Training schools (E&RFTS) were set up at some airports, and the fleet was expanded further with aircraft including Tiger Moths, Piper J-4 Cubs, Hillson Pragas and an Avro Anson.

The following list of Straight Corporation's airfields gives a brief account of their activities at each one. With the start of World War II in September 1939 all civil aviation activities stopped.

=== Bury St Edmunds ===
Westley Airfield was opened in May 1938 by Straight Corporation, and was operated at first by Bury St Edmunds Airport Ltd as a satellite of Ipswich Airport, and later by Southern Airways. A municipal airport was planned but never started. West Suffolk Aero Club Ltd was set up with two Taylorcraft aircraft, and two small hangars built. Too small for CAG use, civilian flying stopped at the outbreak of WWII and the airfield was taken over by the RAF as RAF Westley.

=== Clacton ===
This airfield was taken over in 1938 as a satellite of Ipswich. The airport was known as Earls Hall Airport or Alton Park Road Airport. There is no record of a flying club here at the time.

=== Exeter ===
Exeter Airport at Clyst Honiton was the second airport operated by Straight Corporation, starting in January 1936. Exeter Airport Ltd, with Bill Parkhouse as manager, took a 21-year lease starting on 1 June 1937, and the field officially opened on 30 July. At first there was only tented accommodation, but a new terminal designed by Hening and Chitty was completed in 1938.

Exeter Aero Club was formed, and it participated in the CAG scheme. No 37 E&RFTS started on 3 July 1939.

At the start of WWII the airport was taken over by the Air Ministry and managed as a State Airport. During the war the airport was active, and 601 Squadron was based here in late 1940, during which time Flight Lieutenant Whitney Straight, flying a Hawker Hurricane, claimed to have shot down a Heinkel He 111. After the war, the airport was transferred to the Ministry of Civil Aviation on 1 January 1947. Exeter Airport Ltd leased it, with Wing Commander Bill Parkhouse (he had been promoted during the war) in charge, and also re-established Exeter Aero Club. The lease ended in 1974 when Devon County Council took responsibility for the airport.

=== Haldon ===
Haldon Airport, later known as Teignmouth Aerodrome, was Devon's first airfield, and the airfield where Whitney Straight learned to fly in 1929. The corporation's Haldon Airport Ltd took over the management of the airfield from 1 January 1937 and bought it outright in 1938 after the scheduled airlines serving it had moved to Exeter in 1937.

The South Devon Flying Club had started here in 1933, but when the corporation took over it became a branch of the Plymouth and District Aero Club. When the CAG scheme started the Haldon club received 19 applications.

The airfield saw some military activity during WWII, but closed in 1946.

=== Herne Bay ===
Straight Corporation was reported to have licensed an airfield at Pouts Field, Swalecliffe in 1938. The location of this airfield is unclear, and apart from some pleasure flights, no other aviation activity has been reported there.

=== Inverness ===
Longman Airfield was built in 1933 for Highland Airways to serve Orkney and Wick, with services starting on 8 May.

The corporation took over the management of the airfield in 1937, forming Inverness Airport Ltd and Inverness Aero Club. After considerable activity during WWII, the airfield reopened, mainly for BEA services, but closed in 1947.

=== Ipswich ===
Ipswich Airport was the third airport taken over by Straight Corporation, in February 1936. Ipswich Airport Ltd managed it and took over Ipswich Aero Club which was already established. A new terminal building was designed by Hening and Chitty, and opened on 9 May 1938, with an official opening ceremony on 9 July. It became a Grade II listed building in 1996.

The CAG scheme was adopted here, and in 1939 No 45 E&RFTS was established.

The corporation established an engine workshop in 1939, which worked for the corporation's own fleet and took on outside work.

=== Newquay ===
Newquay's Trebelzue Big Field was first used for flying on 27 and 28 August 1933 by Alan Cobham's National Aviation Day tour, and used for occasional flying afterwards. Straight's corporation leased it in 1938 as a potential municipal airport, and Western Airways started services the same year.

In WWII the field was incorporated into RAF St Mawgan which was built adjacent to it.

=== Plymouth ===
Plymouth (Roborough) Airport was the fourth airport to be taken over by Straight Corporation, in March 1936. It was managed by Plymouth Airport Ltd, and the Plymouth and District Aero Club was taken over, later setting up a branch at Haldon. It operated the CAG training scheme from 1938.

The airport reopened for civil traffic after the war in March 1947, and the aero club not only restarted, but managed the airport for the local council.

=== Ramsgate ===
Ramsgate Airport was the first to be taken over by Straight Corporation, who often called it Thanet. It was operated by Ramsgate Airport Ltd which was formed on 25 July 1935. Its directors were Mr F.A.S. Gwatkin, Richard Seaman and Whitney Straight. The official opening of the new terminal, incorporating the control tower, was on 21 August 1937. The existing Ramsgate Flying Club was replaced by the Thanet Aero Club. It took part in the CAG training scheme.

The company also set up on the airfield a tented holiday camp with its own clubhouse. For the 1936 and 1937 summer seasons it was called the Ramsgate Aviation Holiday Camp, and it was renamed the Ramsgate Flying Centre for the following two years. It offered guests free pleasure flights and a free flying lesson.

=== Swansea ===
Jersey Marine Airport had started in 1928, and been the base of Wales Airways. The airport was purchased or leased from the Earl of Jersey, who was a personal friend of Straight. The corporation planned to develop it into a municipal airport. It was licensed on 14 July 1938 and Western Airways routes started to Weston and Bristol. No development or terminal had been achieved before WWII.

=== Weston-super-Mare ===
Weston Airport was the base of Western Airways, and its holding company, Airways Union, operated the airport. Straight took over all their operations in January 1938. A new terminal/engineering building was planned but, because of disagreements with the council, never built.

Western Airways Aero Club was formed in 1937, and on 10 March 1938 was renamed Weston Aero Club on the corporation's takeover. It joined the CAG training scheme on 1 October 1938. No 39 E&RFTS was set up on 3 July 1939 and a new hangar built to cope with the expansion.

At the start of WWII the airport was taken over by the Air Ministry and managed as a State Airport. After WWII, the flying club restarted on 7 June 1946, renamed the Weston Aero Club. It continued until rising costs caused Western Airways to withdraw its support, and the club was wound up in October 1949.

== Aircraft ==
Before WWII, Straight Corporation used a wide variety of aircraft, some inherited from the airlines and flying clubs that it took over, and many bought new.

The pre-war company aircraft livery, applied to many, but not all, of the aircraft, was a dark metallic blue-grey with crimson lettering outlined in white, with rudders bearing crimson and white horizontal stripes. After the war the livery was overall silver with red lettering, retaining the horizontal rudder stripes.

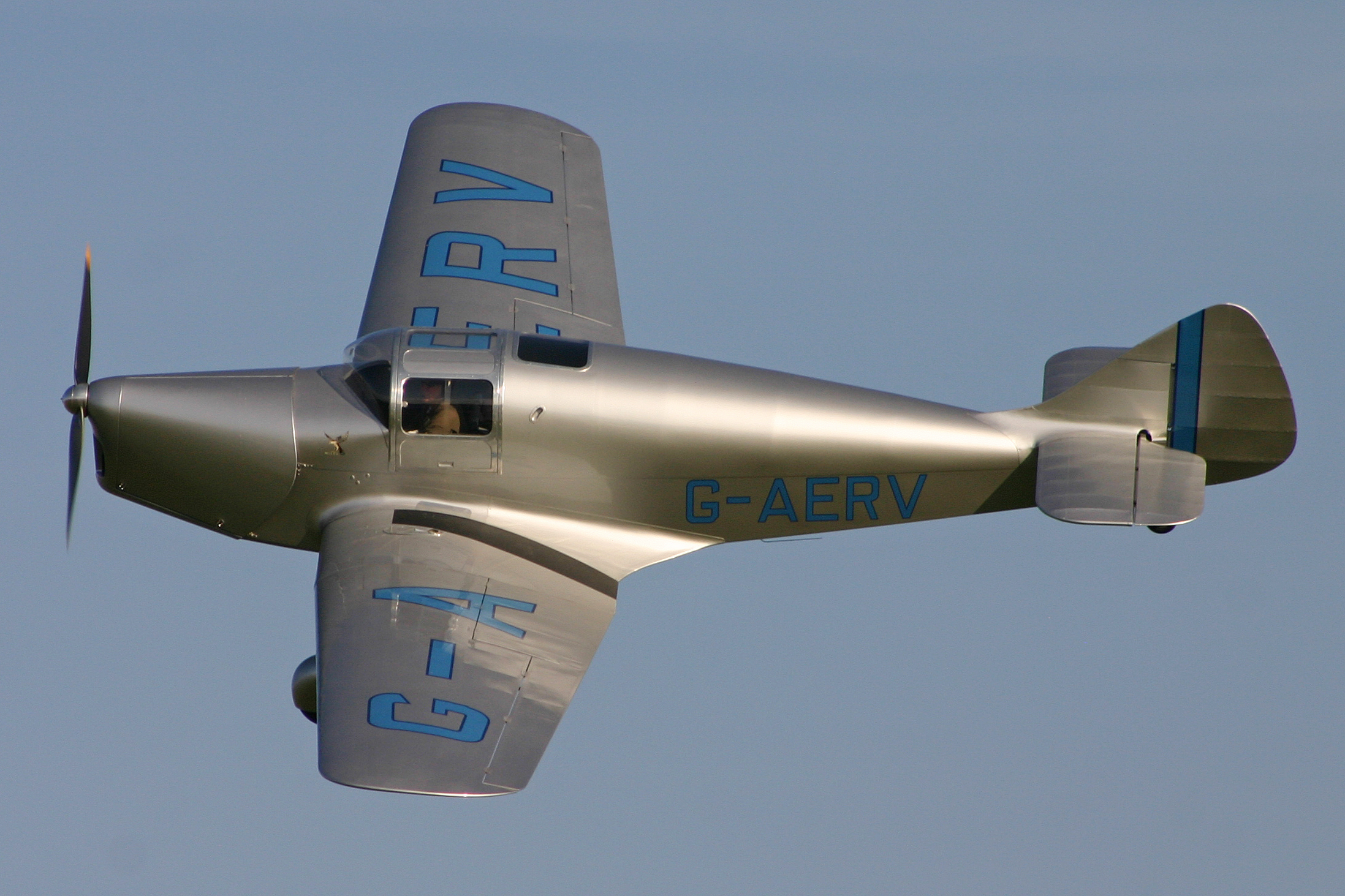
Miles M.11A Whitney Straight G-AERV (never owned by Straight Corporation)

Wanting to provide a modern, comfortable and economical monoplane for his flying clubs, Straight commissioned FG Miles to design a side-by-side seating touring aircraft, which became the Miles M.11A, named the Whitney Straight. This proved to be an excellent and popular aircraft, and 50 were built from April 1936 to April 1938, and Straight Corporation did buy several. A company called Whitney Straight Ltd was formed to market the aircraft.

With Western Airways came a fleet of de Havilland twin-engined aircraft: Dragons and Dragon Rapides, to which were added a Dragonfly and a four-engined DH.86 Express. Inherited aircraft were painted in Straight corporation colours, but had Western Airways marked on both sides of the nose along with a Straight Corporation S logo.

Southern Airways operated a pair of Short Scions, a pair of Percival Q.6s, a Dragon, a Rapide, and a General Aircraft ST-6 Monospar, all of which were twin-engined airliners.

The airport companies and aero clubs had a diverse range of aircraft, some registered in their own name and some to Straight Corporation Ltd, of which the most numerous were British Aircraft Swallow II, Hillson Praga, de Havilland Hornet Moth, Miles Hawk Trainer III, and in 1939, de Havilland Tiger Moth and Piper J-4A Cub Coupe. As stated above, many of these aircraft were moved between various parts of the organisation, some on a regular basis.

== Other activities ==
=== Training ===
On 1 January 1939 Straight Aviation Training Ltd was formed with a view to commercial flying training, and Neville Cumming DFC, an ex Imperial Airways flying boat captain, was appointed director of training. A civil air navigation school was established at Weston, as was an engineering school to provide skilled staff for the growing maintenance demands of Western Airways.

=== Consultancy ===
Despite having had the beautiful terminal at Ramsgate designed by art deco architect David Playdell-Bouverie, Straight had formed a close working relationship with Robert Hening and Anthony M Chitty. They had worked at Straight's parents' home, Dartington Hall, and Chitty learned to fly to help him appreciate the details of airport siting, design, construction and operation. Thus it was Chitty who, starting in 1938, led an Aerodrome Consultancy Service under the banner of Straight Corporation. They designed the corporation's terminals at Ipswich, Exeter and Weston.

=== Model making ===
Woodason Aircraft Models was started by Victor Woodason in 1936 at Heston Airport. It became an associate of Straight Corporation in the early part of the war. The models were used mainly for photographic purposes for aircraft recognition. These were in great demand and a further factory was opened at Weston Airport during the early years of WWII. Work continued after the war, making extremely detailed models for radar stealth testing of all types of land vehicles, ships, aircraft and missiles for the National Radar Target Modelling Centre (NRTMC) that was being run by EMI.

== World War II ==
When war was declared all civil airports were closed and civil flying banned, except under special license. This effectively stopped all Straight Corporation's activities, with the one exception of Western Airways. Their engineering activities prospered with contracts from British aircraft manufacturers, mainly for parts manufacture and repair, and British and Allied forces for repair, modification and maintenance.

Straight himself had joined the Auxiliary Air Force, and became Acting Pilot Officer in 601 Squadron, going on to have a remarkable military career despite serious injury, capture and escape, and was awarded the DFC, Military Cross, CBE and US Legion of Merit.

== Post-war ==
The aviation scene was very different after the war. Airlines were restructured and nationalised, and many airports had either been closed or retained by the military. Private flying had ceased after almost all the aircraft had been impressed and many had been either wrecked or scrapped, so the activity would take a decade to recover.

Straight Corporation's head office had moved from London to Weston Airport, where Western Airways had been very busy, mainly on engineering work and aircraft production.

The flying clubs were resurrected after the war, with Weston Aero Club being the first, in June 1946. Plymouth and Exeter followed, but the clubs in Suffolk and Essex were replaced by the Home Counties Flying Club, with bases at Radlett and Willingale in Essex. Willingale had been an early USAAF base, known later as RAF Chipping Ongar, built by the Americans in 1942–3, and used most recently by the RAF Technical Training Command.

Western Airways and the remaining clubs were able to reclaim some of their pre-war aircraft, and some others were acquired, including Miles Magisters and ten Fairchild Argus 24Ws which were being sold off very cheaply by the RAF.

Fairchild Argus 24W fleet – at first all were registered to Home Counties Aero Club at Willingale:

G-AJOW ex EV790
G-AJOX ex FK352
G-AJOY ex FK358
G-AJOZ ex FK338
G-AJPA ex FK343
G-AJPB ex EV782
G-AJPC ex FK315
G-AJPD ex FK357
G-AJSA ex HM174
G-AJSB ex EV810

After WWII Neville Cumming was reappointed after his RAF service as head of Straight Aviation Training Ltd, and formed the Central Navigation School and The London Link Trainer Centre as subsidiaries. These were both based at Bush House in the Aldwych in London. Other directors of Straight Aviation Training Ltd were Whitney Straight, Louis Strange, and Francis Chichester who, after his record-breaking flight from Britain to Australia and New Zealand had become a senior navigation officer at the RAF's Central Flying School. A fleet of Avro Ansons was procured, modified as navigation trainers by Western Airways at Weston and painted in the new Straight livery of overall silver with red lettering and retaining the red horizontal rudder stripes. They operated from Willingale.

Avro Anson 1 navigation trainers of Straight Aviation Training Ltd:

G-AIEZ ex NK728
G-AIFA ex EF928
G-AIFB ex EG593
G-AIFC ex EG391
G-AIFD ex DJ492
G-AINZ ex MG281
G-AIOA ex NK601
G-AIOB ex NK843

The Ansons were in use from 1946 to 1948, after which they were returned to Weston Airport for refurbishing and sale. The company was wound up in 1949.

Whitney Straight himself had embarked on a new path, starting a career as a major figure in British aviation. He became a director, later chairman, of the Royal Aero Club and, in August 1946, deputy chairman of the British European Airways Corporation. He went on to become vice chairman and chief executive of BOAC, and hold very high positions in Rolls-Royce and other major British companies.

With all of these responsibilities, his activities for the corporation had to be severely reduced and in 1949 the organisation was restructured. The remaining companies were renamed to avoid the Straight name, for example Straight Aviation Training became Southern Aviation Training. Western Airways' airline operations had restarted quite successfully for a while, and its engineering activities prospered, but both soon declined and were abandoned, and the organisation eventually ran down. The corporation effectively stopped its activities by 1978, when the last of the main companies, Western Airways, closed. Whitney Straight died in London in 1979, and the last vestiges of Straight Corporation were wound up in 1989.

== See also ==
National Flying Services Ltd., an earlier similar concept which, despite government aid, collapsed in 1934.

== Bibliography ==
- Dudley, Roger; Johnson, Ted (2013). Weston-Super-Mare and the Aeroplane 1910-2010. Stroud, UK: Amberley Publishing. ISBN 9781445632148.
