= Trafford Park Aerodrome =

- IATA: none; ICAO: none

Summary
- Serves: Manchester
- Location: England
- Opened: 1911
- Closed: 1918
- Coordinates: 53.47°N 2.32°W
- Interactive map of Trafford Park Aerodrome

Trafford Park Aerodrome (Manchester) was the first purpose-built airfield in the Manchester area. Its large all-grass landing field was just south of the Manchester Ship Canal between Trafford Park Road, Moseley Road and Ashburton Road and occupied a large part of the former deer park of Trafford Hall. Today's Tenax Road runs north–south through the centre of the site of the old airfield, which was 0.7 miles northeast of today's Trafford Centre.

== Operations in 1911–1912 ==
Manchester Aerodrome Ltd was formed in late 1910 to rent the land and prepare the surface for flying and this work was completed by summer 1911.

The first known use of Trafford Park airfield was by Henry Melly on 7 July 1911 when he flew his Blériot monoplane, with A. Dukinfield-Jones as passenger, from his base at Waterloo just north of Liverpool to meet Alliott Verdon Roe for lunch at Trafford Hall. By prior arrangement, A.V. Roe had laid out white sheets on the aerodrome to indicate the location of the landing area. Melly's return flight later that day was the first heavier-than-air flight to depart from Manchester. Melly's flight was re-enacted a 100 years later on 7 July 2011 when four light aircraft flew in formation from Liverpool Airport via Waterloo, overflying the Trafford Park airfield site.

At the end of July, the remaining competitors in a 'Round Britain Air Race' reached Trafford Park from Edinburgh via Carlisle to be greeted by a large crowd of spectators. French aviator Lt. Conneau arrived first in his Bleriot, leaving for Bristol and Brooklands to win the race. Only three others completed the course, including James Valentine of Mottram Hall who reached Manchester in his Deperdussin on 29 July.

== Operations in 1914–1918 ==
A major public event was held at the aerodrome on 20 June 1914, when it was the turning point for a Hendon-Birmingham-Manchester and return air race. A crowd of 100,000 persons witnessed the flying. Louis Strange arrived first in his Blériot monoplane, being greeted by the Lord Mayor of Manchester, who stepped on a bracing wire, which broke on takeoff, and put Strange out of the race, which was won by a French airman. Other competitors included John Alcock in his Farman biplane.

The airfield latterly saw little use and closed during 1918.
