= Haldon Aerodrome =

Airfield in Devon, England (1928 – 1968)

- IATA: none; ICAO: none

Summary
- Operator: WR Parkhouse, Straight Corporation, Fleet Air Arm
- Serves: Teignmouth, Devon
- Location: 2.5 mi (4.0 km) northwest of Teignmouth
- Elevation AMSL: 770 ft (230 m)
- Coordinates: 50°34′32″N 03°31′51″W

Map
- Interactive map of Haldon Aerodrome

Runways
Direction	Length		Surface
Direction	ft	m	Surface
00/18	2,755	840	Grass
05/23	2,105	642	Grass
14/32	1,620	494	Grass
- Runway data from 1945 map

Haldon Aerodrome was the first airfield in Devon. Established in the 1920s as a private flying field, it developed into an airport with scheduled airline service, and was used by the Navy during World War II. The airport has also been known as Teignmouth Airport, Little Haldon Airfield and in its military days, Royal Naval Air Station Haldon, or more commonly RNAS Haldon, (commissioned HMS Heron II).

== History ==
=== Development ===
William Richard "Bill" Parkhouse, an ex Royal Naval Air Service (RNAS) pilot, established the Agra Engineering Company as a motor company in Teignmouth after World War I. He had hoped to expand by becoming the West Country dealer for De Havilland aircraft, and wanted a flying field for himself.

In 1928 he rented 80 acres (32 ha) of heathland to the north-west of Teignmouth. There are not many flat areas in the region, and despite the rough ground and the altitude of the field leading to regular high winds and low cloud, he established an airfield. The land was rolled as flat as possible with a concrete roller pulled by an ancient tractor, and boundaries were marked with some white-painted rocks. By this time the local De Havilland dealership had been awarded to another company, and Parkhouse gained a concession from the Avro company buying an Avro Avian III, G-EBXO. This was the first aircraft to land on the new airfield – Parkhouse flew it in on 6 May 1928. As there was no hangar on the airfield he folded the wings and towed the aircraft into town, placing it in his car showroom.

A small corrugated iron hangar was built, capable of holding two light aircraft, and a fuel tank and pump installed. A landing circle was marked out and also the name "Haldon" in 16 feet (4.9 m) high letters. Parkhouse started giving flying lessons, and one of his first pupils was Whitney Straight, who lived at nearby Dartington Hall, who offset some of the cost of the lessons by driving the tractor to help level the field. With Parkhouse's tuition Straight gained his "A" licence a few days after his 17th birthday with 50 hours in his logbook. (Note: Bill Parkhouse was to have a great influence on Straight, convincing him of the concept that led to the founding of the Straight Corporation and their subsequent careers.) By the end of 1928, the airfield was quite busy, with 13 student pilots.

The De Havilland dealership in Teignmouth had not gone well, having not sold any aircraft at all, so in 1929, Parkhouse succeeded in taking it over. He bought one himself, selling the Avian to Whitney Straight, who subsequently bought two more De Havillands, a Gipsy Moth and a Puss Moth, from Parkhouse's agency. Parkhouse also sold aircraft to his friends, and others, and several of them provided him with good business by often upgrading to the latest models. Several also based their aircraft on the airfield. He was proud to boast that his was the only garage in the country that also sold aeroplanes.

Parkhouse's ground engineer around 1929 was Howard Pixton who had been A V Roe's first test pilot before winning the 1914 Schneider Trophy races at Monaco. He had recently come from Windermere in the Lake District where he had run a small floatplane operation for Avro.

The official opening of the airport took place on 21 September 1929, which Sir Sefton Brancker, the Director of Civil Aviation attended, arriving in his Moth appropriately registered G-EDCA. A flying display was held, but a planned air race was abandoned due to poor weather conditions.

The South Devon Flying Club was formed here in 1933, One of its first students was Ruth Fontés who gained her 'A' certificate in a Gipsy Moth on 26 July. The airfield became popular with horse jockeys and trainers visiting local racecourses at Exeter, Newton Abbot and Totnes.

On 20 August 1934 Haldon participated in the inauguration of mail services across the UK by Railway Air Services (RAS). It was the first stop on the already-established scheduled route from Plymouth, with further stops at Cardiff and Birmingham en route to Liverpool, flown by a De Havilland Dragon. 574 letters were delivered on the outward flight, and more on the return the same day. However this was a one-off as "Teignmounth", as Haldon was known by RAS, was removed from the schedule the next day.

On 1 January 1937 Whitney Straight's Straight Corporation formed Haldon Airport Ltd which took over the management of the airport from Parkhouse, and the following year it bought the freehold of the land. Parkhouse was at that time involved with establishing airports at Plymouth and Exeter, both of which projects the Straight Corporation took over, and Parkhouse went on to be the director of Exeter Airport Ltd, and also a member of the board of Airways Union, the Straight Corporation's holding company. The flying club at Haldon became a branch of the Plymouth and District Aero Club, also run by the Straight Corporation.

In the summer of 1937 the Devon Gliding Club started, and Whitney Straight was an active member.

At the end of 1938 the government's Civil Air Guard subsidised pilot training scheme was started, and 19 applications were received for training at the flying club.

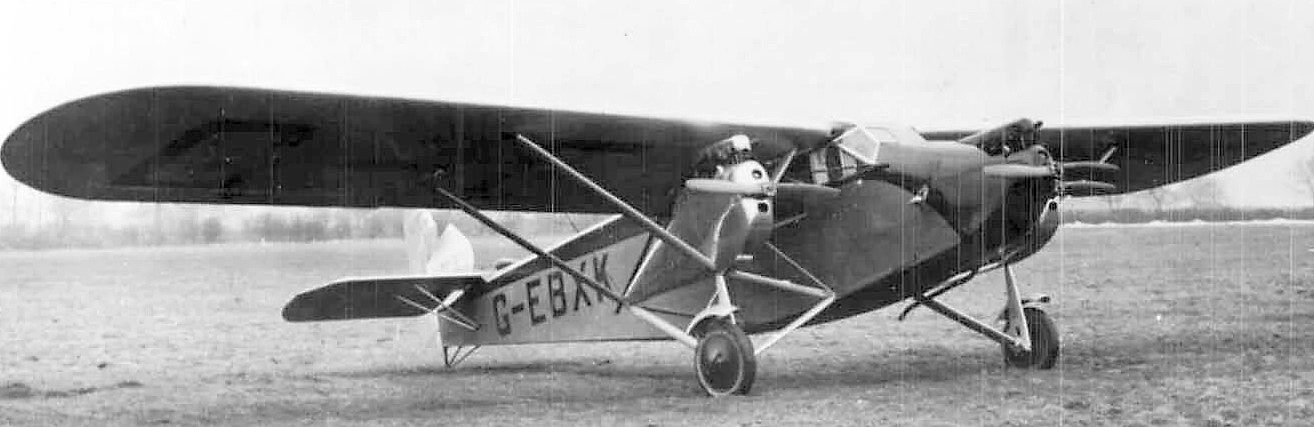
A Westland Wessex, G-EBXK, of Cobham's National Aviation Days.

=== Scheduled services ===
GWR Air Services set up the first scheduled service at Haldon. It started on 12 April 1933 as a stop on their twice-daily Cardiff — Plymouth service. It used Westland Wessex airliners leased from Imperial Airways, and a suitably timed bus service connected their passengers with Teignmouth and Torquay. The service only lasted until the end of the year, when the airline was merged into the new Railway Air Services.

Provincial Airways ran a West Country Air Service between Croydon Airport and Plymouth, with intermediate stops at Southampton and Haldon, which they called Torquay. Starting in November 1933 they used De Havilland Fox Moths, which in May 1934 were replaced by De Havilland Dragons. During 1935 the service ran twice daily, but ended when the airline closed at the end of the year.

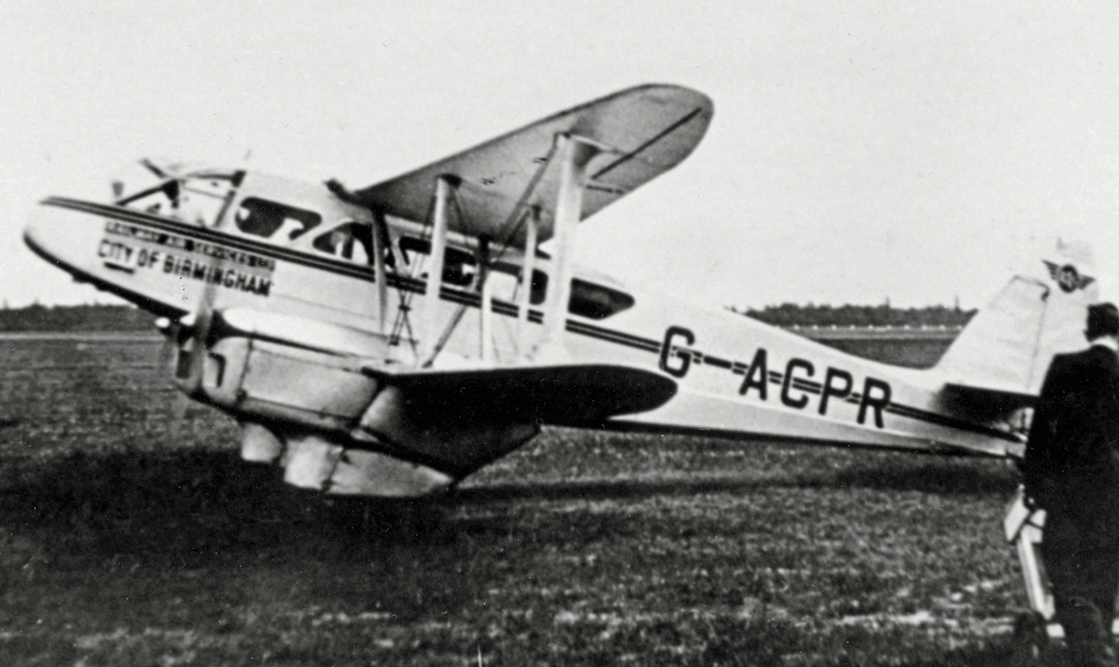
DH.89 Dragon Rapide G-ACPR of Railway Air Services in 1938.

Railway Air Services started a service on 7 May 1934 linking Liverpool with Plymouth via Birmingham, Cardiff and Haldon. They promoted links with Western Airways for connecting flights to Bristol and Bournemouth.

Air Dispatch Ltd during 1934 operated a service from their base in Croydon via Portsmouth and Haldon to Plymouth. The company was founded in 1934, one of several airlines founded by the Hon. Mrs Victor Bruce.

Scheduled services moved to Exeter when that airport opened on 31 May 1937.

=== Events ===
After the gathering on the opening day in 1929, annual events were organised at the airport, named the Haldon Air Rallye [sic]. These were very popular events, with participation from the RAF, and including air races, with the Teignmouth Air Trophy being hotly contested. The Rallyes were held on 21 June 1930 and 5 September 1931.

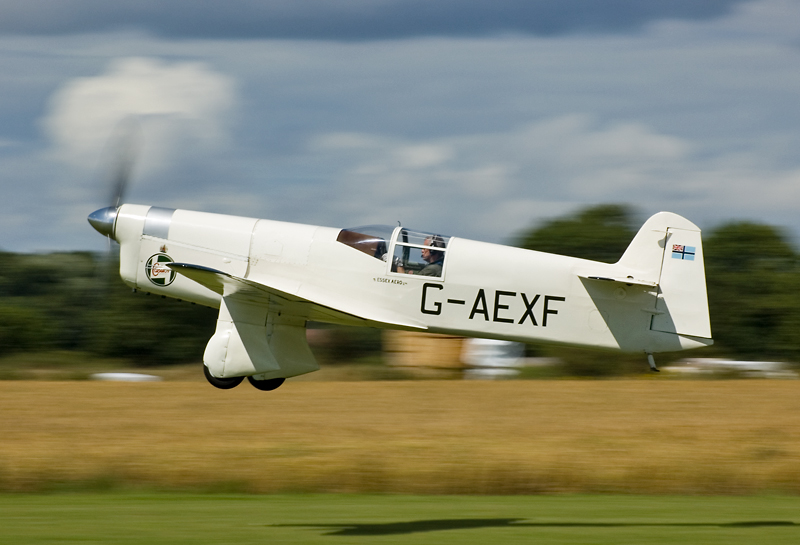
Alex Henshaw's Percival Mew Gull G-AEXF still flying in 2015.

After a break, the next Rallye was held as part of the Devon Air Day, on 27 July 1937. Now in the hands of the Straight Corporation the other local Straight airports at Exeter and Plymouth held shows on the same day, and Parkhouse himself did the commentary at Haldon. A formation of three Royal Air Force Saunders-Roe London flying boats and another of three Gloster Gauntlets did low flypasts at all three airports. An air race started and finished at Plymouth, with turning points at Haldon and Exeter. It attracted several of the famous aviators of the time such as Geoffrey De Havilland in his TK.2 and Alex Henshaw in his Percival Mew Gull. These two were the fastest, but as it was a handicap race, they came fifth and sixth respectively, with Percival Phillips winning in an Avro 504N. All visiting pilots were invited back to Haldon for a party and prize-giving at a Teignmouth hotel.

Other notable events at Haldon were the famous shows put on by Alan Cobham. His first tour, called the Municipal Aerodrome Campaign, involved free flights to local dignitaries and children, followed by as many paid-for pleasure flights as could be managed for the public. The tour visited 110 venues between May and October 1929 using a ten-passenger de Havilland DH.61 Giant Moth G-AAEV named Youth of Britain. The tour called at Haldon on 27 August. After this, Cobham formed a team, known as the Cobham Air Circus, or Cobham's Flying Circus, who staged National Aviation Days around Britain. These extremely popular tours lasted for four seasons, visiting Haldon on the following dates: 15 August 1932, 25 August 1933 (No 1 Tour), (Note: In 1933 there were two simultaneous tours throughout the season, named Number 1 and Number 2. In 1935 there again were two, but only from 1 July, named Astra and Ferry.) 11 August 1934 and 17 August 1935 (Astra Show).

There were also visits from C D Barnard's Air Circus (13 August 1931) and the British Hospitals Air Pageant (8 June 1933).

== World War II ==
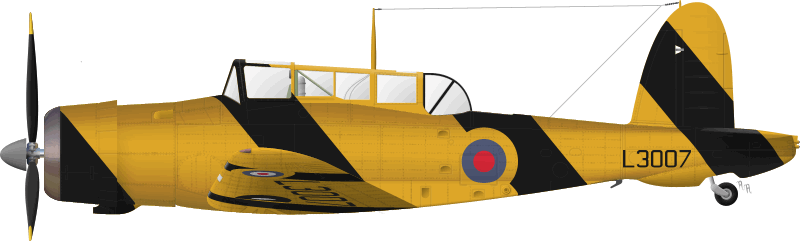
A Blackburn Skua in target tug markings.

On 3 September 1939 all civilian flying in the UK was prohibited. The airfield lay unused for a while, before being requisitioned by the Air Ministry and occasionally used by communications aircraft during armament testing at a nearby range. The Research Development Flight used the airfield to help develop balloon cable cutters and airfield rocket defences. It was then transferred to the Admiralty as RNAS Haldon, and as an outpost of RNAS Yeovilton (HMS Heron), was named HMS Heron II on 18 August 1941. It was used by the Fleet Air Arm for Admiralty target towing by detachments of Blackburn Skuas of 794 Squadron and Miles Masters of 761 Squadron.

No 84 Gliding School of the Air Training Corps also moved in, leaving for Exeter in June 1946.

Being too small for larger aircraft, more land was requisitioned, some from a neighbouring golf course, and the runways were extended. A few hardstandings were also built, with some Sommerfeld steel tracking laid and land drainage work undertaken, enabling larger aircraft such as Boulton Paul Defiants and Miles Martinets to use the airfield. Nearby accommodation was also requisitioned.

In January 1943 HMS Heron II moved to RNAS Charlton Horethorne which had opened 10 July 1942, and by May 1943 the admiralty had grown tired of the high winds and low cloud that so often hampered operations, and the airfield was reduced to a Care and Maintenance status. There was very little activity at the airfield for the remainder of the war.

== Post-war ==
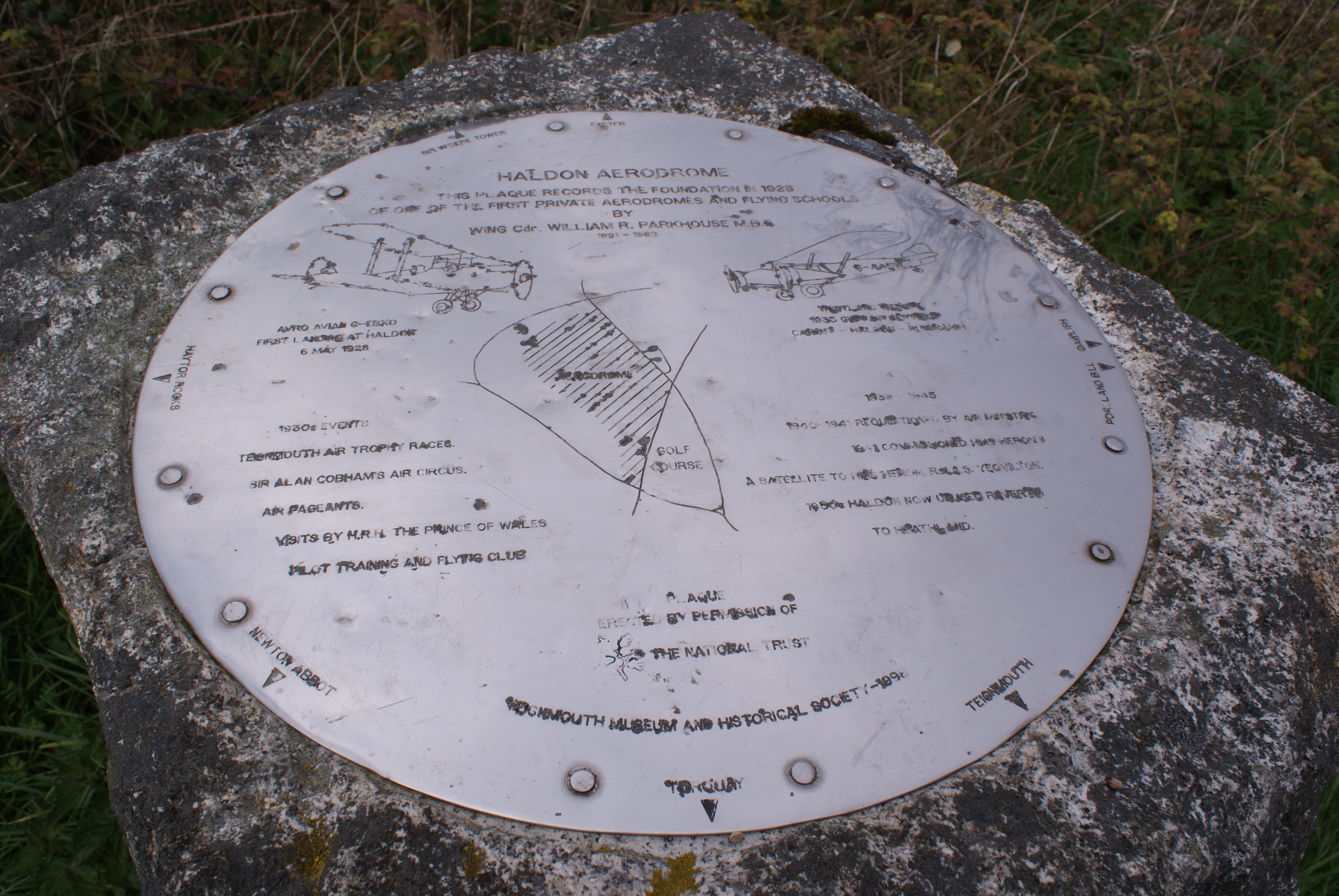
Toposcope plaque at Haldon airport

In 1946 some efforts were made to re-establish the airfield, but without success. The land requisitioned from the golf club was returned to them, and the rest of the land reverted to rough moorland. All that remains of the airfield are a few patches of hardstanding, and a toposcope plaque set up by the Teignmouth Museum and Historical Society in 1998. The last time an aircraft used the site was in 1968 when a Piper Tri-Pacer 160 owned by a member of the landowner's family flew in.

== Accidents and incidents ==
- At the airport's opening airshow held on 21 September 1929, Cierva C.19 Mk I G-AAGL was touching down when it was caught by a gust of wind and blown backwards, cartwheeling, fortunately ending up on its undercarriage. It was written off, but the pilot, Mr A. H. C. Rowson, Cierva's test pilot, was unharmed. The accident was filmed.
- RAF de Havilland DH.82 Tiger Moth R5148 was blown over on take-off on 11 February 1945 and struck off that month.
