= RAF Chipping Ongar =

Airport in Essex, England

RAF Chipping Ongar RAF Willingale USAAF Station AAF-162 Willingale Airfield
- Near Chipping Ongar, Essex in England
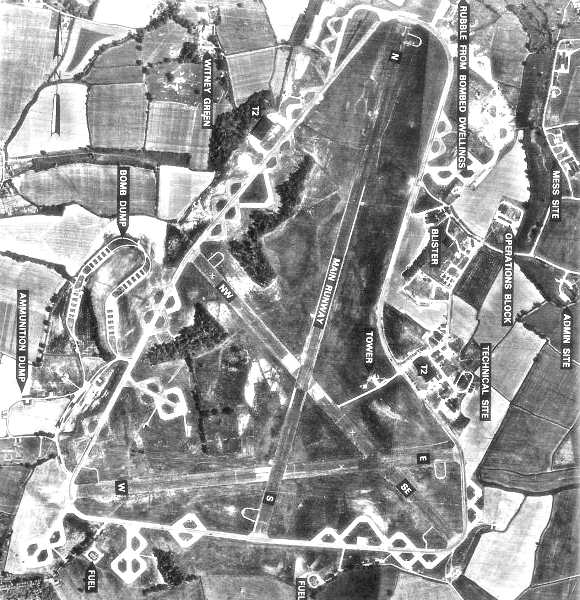
- Chipping Ongar Airfield - 21 June 1947 in a reserve status.

Site information
- Type: Royal Air Force Station
- Owner: Air Ministry
- Operator: Royal Air Force; United States Army Air Forces
- Controlled by: RAF Technical Training Command; Eighth Air Force

Location
- Shown within Essex RAF Chipping Ongar (the United Kingdom)
- Coordinates: 51°43′30″N 000°17′19″E

Site history
- Built: 1942
- In use: 1942 - 1959
- Battles/wars: European theatre of World War II

Airfield information
- Elevation: 77 metres (253 ft) AMSL
Runways
Direction	Length and surface
02/20	1,828 metres (5,997 ft) Asphalt
04/22	1,280 metres (4,199 ft) Asphalt
10/28	1,280 metres (4,199 ft) Asphalt

Royal Air Force Chipping Ongar or more simply RAF Chipping Ongar is a former Royal Air Force station located 2 miles (3.2 km) northeast of Chipping Ongar, Essex, England.

Opened in 1943, it was used by both the Royal Air Force (RAF) and United States Army Air Forces (USAAF). During the war it was used primarily as a bomber airfield. After the war it was closed in 1959 after many years of being a reserve airfield.

Today, the remains of the airfield are located on private property being used as agricultural fields.

== History ==
=== United States Army Air Forces use ===
The airfield was opened in the early spring of 1943 and was used by the United States Army Air Forces Eighth and Ninth Air Forces.

Chipping Ongar was known as USAAF Station AAF-162 for security reasons by the USAAF during the war, and by which it was referred to instead of location. Its USAAF Station Code was "JC".

USAAF Station Units assigned to RAF Chipping Ongar were:

- 53rd Service Group

53rd and 87th Service Squadrons; HHS, 53rd Service Group

- 21st Weather Squadron
- 40th Mobile Communications Squadron
- 46th Station Complement Squadron
- 1052nd Signal Company
- 1176th Quartermaster Company
- 1288th Military Police Company
- 1812th Ordnance Supply & Maintenance Company
- 2198th Quartermaster Truck Company
- 873rd Chemical Company
- 2047th Engineer Fire Fighting Platoon
- 580th Army Postal Unit
- 196th Medical Dispensary

==== 387th Bombardment Group (Medium) ====
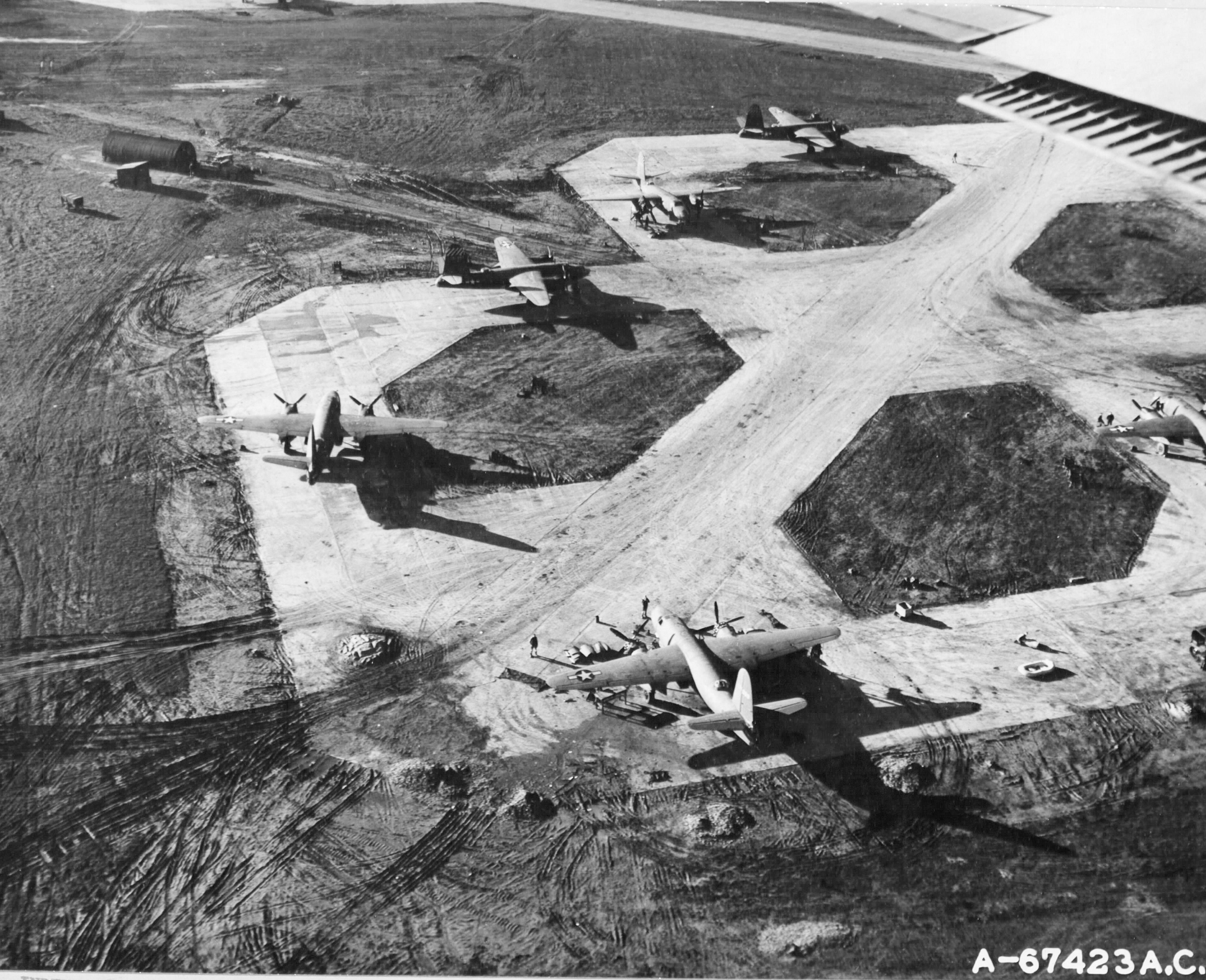
387th Bomb Group B-26 Marauders parked at RAF Chipping Ongar England, 1944

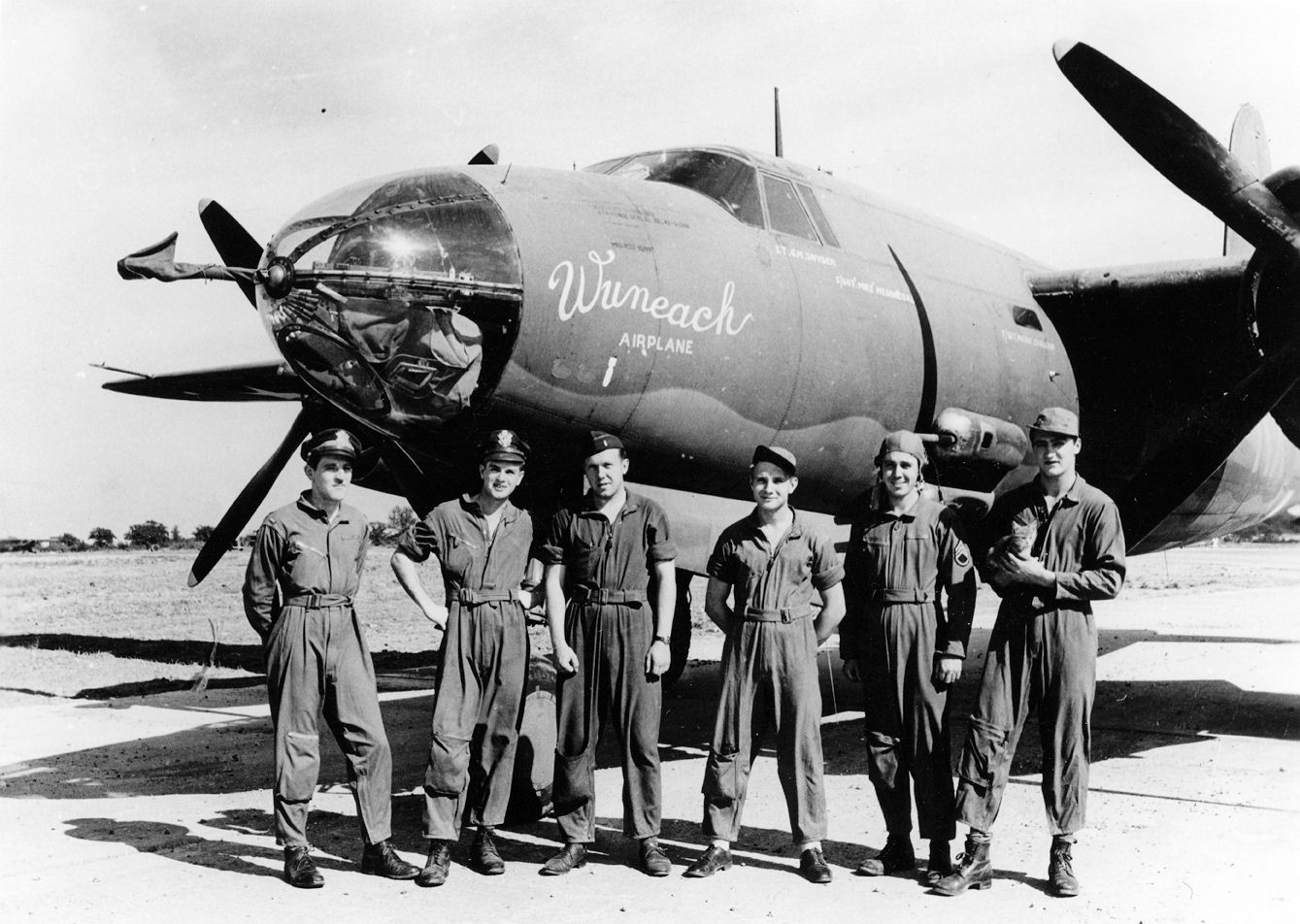
Colonel George Snyder of the 387th Bomb Group and his crew, with their B-26 Marauder nicknamed "Wuneach". Handwritten caption on reverse: 'George Snyder (Ext Left) & crew. From Col RW Keller.'

Parts of the airfield were still under construction when the 387th Bombardment Group (Medium) arrived from Goodman AAF, Kentucky on 25 June 1943. The group was assigned to the 3d Bomb Wing and flew B-26B/C Marauders. Operational squadrons of the 387th were:

- 556th Bombardment Squadron (FW)
- 557th Bombardment Squadron (KS)
- 558th Bombardment Squadron (KX)
- 559th Bombardment Squadron (TQ)

The 387th Bomb Group began combat on 15 August 1943 by joining with three other B-26 groups attacking coastal defences on the French Coast near Boulogne, and was mounted in thick fog. In common with other Marauder units of the 3d Bomb Wing, the 387th was transferred to Ninth Air Force on 16 October 1943.

The 387th Bomb Group moved to RAF Stoney Cross in Hampshire on 21 July 1944 when Ninth Air Force moved the 98th Bomb Wing's four Marauder groups into the New Forest area at the earliest opportunity to place them closer to the French Normandy Invasion beaches.

During September 1944, the airfield was used temporarily by IX Troop Carrier Command as advanced C-47 base during Operation Market-Garden.

==== 61st Troop Carrier Group ====
Troop carrier squadrons of the 61st Troop Carrier Group used the airfield on 24 March 1945, carrying British paratroops as part of Operation Varsity, the airborne crossing of the Rhine River, who dropped near Wesel.

The Americans handed the airfield over to the RAF in April 1945, and it was in the hands of the British Army and RAF Technical Training Command until the end of the war.

=== Post war ===
In 1946 use was made of the airfield, now named Willingale, by the Straight Corporation. They established a branch of the Home Counties Flying Club here, and Straight Aviation Training Ltd operated a fleet of Avro Anson navigation trainers here from 1946 to 1948. A few private aircraft were also based here, but the airfield was closed on 28 February 1959. Most of Chipping Ongar airfield reverted to agricultural use.

One of the large T-2 Hangars was dismantled and re-erected at North Weald airfield. It is believed to be the one nearest the M11 motorway, and now used as a freight forwarding warehouse.

A section of the perimeter track and some loop dispersal hardstands are still intact, connected to a small private landing strip converted from a straight section of the wartime perimeter, aligned 04/22, and one small section of a secondary full-width runway (09/27) on the southeast side . On the northeastern side, the Operations block, Norden Bombsight Store, and the base of the pilots' briefing room are grouped together, and are in quite good condition 51°43′53″N 000°18′09″E. As of 2020 Fyfield Flying Club operates from a small part of the old airfield.

During the 1970s Willingale was one of six proposed sites that were proposed to become the 3rd London airport with that honour going to Stansted.

== See also ==
- List of former Royal Air Force stations
