= Provincial Airways =

British airline

Provincial Airways was a 1930s British airline that was formed in 1933 to operate a service between Croydon and the South West of England, the routes were never a success and the company closed at the end of 1935. The airlines main operating base was Croydon Airport. The managing director was Flight-Lieutenant Harold Thomas, who was one of the pioneer pilots in the early cross-desert mail services and served in WW1 and WW2 in the Royal Air Force. On the board of directors was Air-Commodore P.F.M. Fellowes D.S.O who led the first expedition to fly over Mt. Everest.

== History ==
The company was formed on 12 October 1933 when it took over the assets of International Airlines Limited. International Airlines had attempted to operate a Western Air Express route to carry mail between Croydon, Southampton, Portsmouth and Plymouth using two Monospar ST-4s but the venture failed.

Provincial were to operate a similar route carrying mail, but in the end only two flights from Croydon to Plymouth with a stop at Southamton and return in November 1933 using De Havilland Fox Moths were carried out. In March 1934 they began a weekday service on the London to Plymouth route still using the Fox Moth which was replaced by the larger De Havilland Dragon in May. By 1935 they were flying a twice-daily service between Croydon and Penzance with stops at Portsmouth, Southampton, Bournemouth, Torquay and Plymouth. In February a new route was started between Plymouth and Hull. But the routes were not a financial success and the company closed on 10 December 1935.

== See also ==
- List of defunct airlines of the United Kingdom
