= Louis Strange =

English aviator (1891–1966)

Louis Arbon Strange
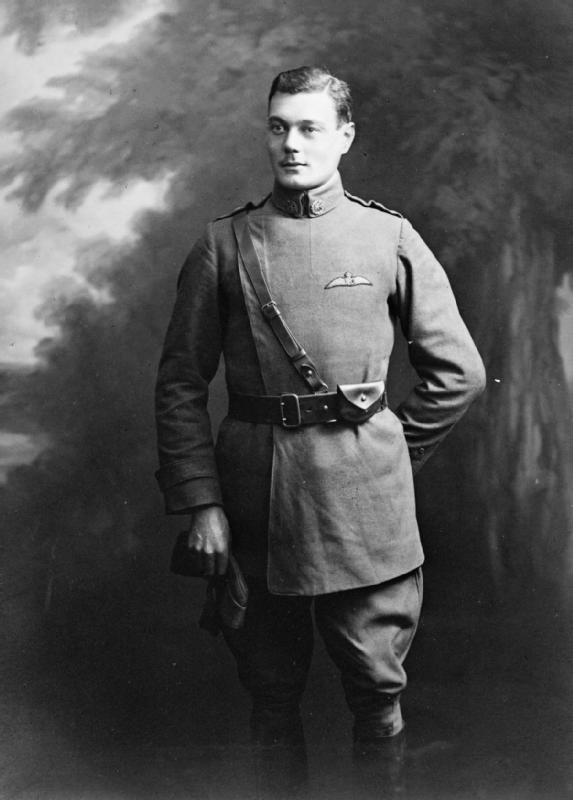
- Louis Strange pictured in 1914
- Born: 27 July 1891; Tarrant Keyneston, Dorset, England
- Died: 15 November 1966 (aged 75); Poole, Dorset, England
- Relatives: Susan Strange (daughter)
- Military career
- Allegiance: United Kingdom
- Branch: British Army; Royal Air Force
- Service years: 1914–1921; 1940–1945
- Rank: Wing Commander
- Units: Queen's Own Dorset Yeomanry; Dorsetshire Regiment; No. 5 Squadron RFC; No. 6 Squadron RFC; No. 24 Squadron RAF
- Commands: No. 23 Squadron RFC; No. 80 Wing RAF; No. 1 Parachute Training School RAF; Merchant Ship Fighter Unit; RAF Valley; RAF Hawkinge
- Conflicts: World War I: Western Front; World War II
- Awards: Distinguished Service Order; Officer of the Order of the British Empire; Military Cross; Distinguished Flying Cross & Bar; Bronze Star Medal (United States)
- Other work: Businessman and farmer

Louis Arbon Strange, DSO, OBE, MC, DFC & Bar (27 July 1891 – 15 November 1966), was an English aviator, who served in both the First and Second World Wars.

== Early life ==
Louis Strange was born in Tarrant Keyneston, Dorset, and was educated at St Edward's School, Oxford, joining the school's contingent of the Dorset Yeomanry. Strange spent his childhood at Tarrant Keynstone Mill on the River Stour. His family farmed 600 acres (2.4 km^{2}) at Spetisbury in Dorset.

He had seen military aircraft and the airship Beta flying over Dorset during the summer manoeuvres of 1912 when serving with the Dorsetshire Yeomanry and determined in May 1913 to become a pilot. He joined the Ewen School of Flying at Hendon Aerodrome in July and gained his Royal Aero Club Aviators' Certificate, No. 575, on 5 August. On 8 October 1913, he was commissioned as a second lieutenant (on probation) in the Royal Flying Corps (Special Reserve).

Just after obtaining his license, he won his first cross-country race and then won the Hendon March Meeting 17-mile (27 km) race, beating his old instructor into second place. In the latter part of 1913 and early 1914, Strange flew many hours from Hendon, instructing trainee pilots. On 4 April 1914, he appeared in Flight magazine as one of five pilots who had recently joined the "Upside Down Club" by performing a loop.

== RFC service ==
His posting to the sixth course of instruction at the RFC's Central Flying School at Upavon, Wiltshire, came in May 1914. There he was retrained to fly the B.E.2b and B.E.8 military aircraft. On 20 June, he took part in a Hendon–Birmingham–Manchester and return air race at the controls of an 80 hp (60 kW) Gnome powered Bleriot monoplane, being first to arrive at Trafford Park Aerodrome, Manchester, where the Lord Mayor greeted him. To reach Strange's hand, the man stood on a bracing wire to the landing gear, damaging it. On takeoff to return south, the wire snapped, smashing the Blériot's propeller, and the machine was damaged, putting him out of the race.

On 30 July 1914 Strange was formally commissioned for service in the Regular Army as a second lieutenant in the Dorsetshire Regiment, but remained on attachment to the Royal Flying Corps, in which he was appointed a flying officer the same day. In August 1914 he was despatched to join his first operational unit, No. 5 Squadron RFC, based at Gosport, Hampshire. On 15/16 August – despite severe weather and a damaged longeron – he flew his Farman aircraft via Dover and over the English Channel to Amiens and then to the unit's new base at Maubeuge, France, being the last of the squadron to arrive.

== Aerial combat and bombing pioneer ==
Strange soon adapted his Farman to carry a Lewis machine gun, improvising a mounting to the top of the observer's nacelle. His first armed encounter with the enemy came on 22 August when six enemy aircraft appeared at 5,000 feet over the airfield at Maubeuge. He took off in his Farman with Lieutenant L. Penn-Gaskell as gunner in the front cockpit to intercept the patrolling Germans, but with inconclusive results as the laden aircraft would not climb above 3,500 feet (1,100 m). The next few days saw a general Allied retreat and the squadron had to move base several times, whilst Strange and his fellow pilots continued their observation and light bombing sorties. Less than two weeks after arriving in France Strange's inventive brain designed home-made petrol bombs that on 28 August he and his observer dropped by hand from their Henry Farman biplane onto the convoys of German troops and transport north of St. Quentin; the results "sent us home very well pleased with ourselves".

In October 1914 Strange invented a safety strap allowing the observer of his Avro 504 to "stand up and fire all round over top of plane and behind". He also designed and fitted a machine gun mounting to the 504, consisting of a crossbar between the central struts over which was slung a rope, allowing the Lewis to be pulled up into a position from which the observer, seating in the front cockpit, could fire backwards over Strange's head. On 22 November 1914 it was with this arrangement that Strange claimed his first victory; with Lieutenant F. Small as gunner, he attacked an Aviatik two-seater and forced it down from over Armentières to make a bumpy landing in a ploughed field just behind the British lines.

On 25 December 1914, Strange flew to the German-held airfield at Lille and, as a Christmas Day prank, bombed it with footballs.

Strange next turned his talents to developing a bomb chute with Lieutenant Euan Rabagliati. Attempting to drop 7-pound shrapnel bombs through a steel tube set in the floor of the Avro 504, one bomb jammed in the tube and prompted a forced landing through a field of corn, which luckily ripped the detonator from the jammed bomb.

On 16 February 1915, he was appointed a flight commander with the acting rank of captain, and posted to No. 6 Squadron. On 10 March, the first day of the battle of Neuve Chapelle, Strange carried out one of the first tactical bombing missions of the war. He had modified his B.E.2c to carry four 20 lb (9.1 kg) bombs on wing racks, which could be released by pulling a cable fitted in the cockpit. He dropped these bombs on Kortrijk railway station, from a height of no more than 150 feet (46 m), causing 75 casualties and closing the station for three days. Subsequently, on 27 March, he was awarded the Military Cross, which he received from the King at Buckingham Palace on 9 December 1915.

While with No. 6 Squadron, Strange was a compatriot of Captain Lanoe Hawker. The squadron became pioneers of many aspects of military aviation at the time, driven largely by the imagination of Strange and the engineering talents of Hawker. Their talents led to various mountings for Lewis machine guns, one of which won Hawker the Victoria Cross, and one that nearly cost Strange his life. Having equipped his Martinsyde S.1 scout with a Lewis gun mounted on the top wing above the cockpit, on 10 May 1915 Strange sought out the enemy to try out the new arrangement and attacked a German Aviatik two-seater. In order to change the empty drum on the Lewis, Strange had to stand up in the cockpit. Immediately the machine flipped on its back, throwing Strange from the cockpit and developing a flat spin downwards. Strange, hanging onto the ammunition drum of the Lewis gun, managed to swing back into the cockpit and kick the stick over to right the aircraft only 500 feet above the ground. Strange later related:

I kept on kicking upwards behind me until at last I got one foot and then the other hooked inside the cockpit. Somehow I got the stick between my legs again, and jammed on full aileron and elevator; I do not know exactly what happened then, but the trick was done. The machine came over the right way up, and I fell off the top plane and into my seat with a bump.

He safely returned to base but was criticised by his CO for "causing unnecessary damage" to his instrument panel and seat in his efforts to regain the cockpit. The squadron's logbook simply noted, "The squadron was fortunate in its personnel."

On 21 September 1915 Louis Strange was appointed to form and command No. 23 Squadron RFC at Gosport, Hampshire. As a squadron commander he held the acting-rank of major, to which he was appointed on 5 November, the day he married his wife, Marjorie. Due to appendicitis, Strange handed over command in March 1916.

Strange then established No. 1 School of Air Gunnery at Hythe in Kent, with the acting-rank of lieutenant-colonel, and formed No. 2 School of Air Gunnery at Turnberry. On 1 April 1917 he became Assistant Commandant at the Central Flying School, graded as a wing commander and retaining his acting rank. On 26 June 1918 Strange was selected to command the newly formed 80th Wing. During the next five months he was to be awarded both the Distinguished Flying Cross and the Distinguished Service Order.

His wing of Sopwith Camels, S.E.5s, DH.9s and Bristol Fighters launched massed raids on the enemy airfields, reducing the effectiveness of German aerial response. Between 1 July and 11 November the seven squadrons under Strange's command (including Nos. 88, 92, 103, 2 AFC & 4 AFC) – the latter two of which were from the Australian Flying Corps – destroyed or drove 'down out of control' some 449 German aircraft, as well as 23 balloons.

On 24 September 1918 Louis' younger brother Gilbert John Strange, a 7-victory ace and a captain in No. 40 Squadron, was killed in action.

== Between the wars ==
On 1 August 1919 Strange was granted a permanent commission in the Royal Air Force with the rank of major, resigning his commission in the Dorsetshire Regiment the same day. On 1 November 1919 he was promoted from squadron leader to wing commander.

Strange retired from the service through ill health (sciatica) on 24 February 1921. He bought 1,300 acres (5.3 km^{2}) of farmland at Worth Matravers on the Isle of Purbeck, and worked them over the next seven years, helping to restore his health. Strange operated a dairy farm with his brother Jack Ronald Stuart Strange, but the partnership was dissolved by mutual consent on 15 October 1928 with Jack Strange taking over the business.

By the late 1920s Strange had become a director and chief pilot of Simmonds Aircraft Limited and remained a director when it became the Spartan Aircraft Company. He was also a director of the Whitney Straight Corporation.

Strange flew company aircraft in several competitions, including the Simmonds Spartan G-AAGN in the 1929 King's Cup Air Race, and the Simmonds Spartan G-AAMG in a 45-mile (72 km) handicap race from Woodley to Hanworth and back at the Reading Air Fete in June 1930, coming 2nd with an average speed of 99 miles per hour (159 km/h).

== RAF service in World War II ==
Too old for a regular commission, on 18 April 1940 Strange returned to military service as a 50-year-old pilot officer in the Royal Air Force Volunteer Reserve. He was posted to No. 24 Squadron, the RAF's only transport and communications services squadron at that time. On 21 May 1940 Strange arrived in Merville in northern France as No. 24 Squadron's Aerodrome Control Officer. The airfield had been evacuated by the RAF fighter squadron stationed there, and No. 24 Squadron were tasked with saving what aircraft and equipment they could. Two fighters were patched up and flown back to England. All remaining Hurricanes had been cannibalised, leaving one in flying condition. With no pilot available, Strange took off in an aircraft type he had never flown before, unarmed, and with most of the instruments missing. Anti-aircraft fire forced Strange up to 8,000 feet (2,400 m) and the lone fighter was then attacked by several Bf 109s. Surprised by the sound of machine-gun fire, Strange dived the Hurricane to tree-top height and successfully escaped. A month later he was awarded a bar to his Distinguished Flying Cross.

On 21 June 1940, Squadron Leader Strange was appointed commanding officer of the newly created Central Landing School (CLS) at RAF Ringway near Manchester. This unit was charged with the initiation, development and organisation of the UK's sole parachute training facility, and which later pioneered the parachute training curriculum of the Allied airborne forces. The unit was later redesignated No.1 Parachute Training School RAF (PTS). Using the techniques developed under Strange, the PTS trained over 60,000 Allied personnel and paratroopers at Ringway between 1940 and 1946.

On 5 May 1941, the Merchant Ship Fighter Unit (MSFU) was established at RAF Speke near Liverpool, and Strange was appointed as commanding officer. The MSFU was charged with the development of the CAM ship for the catapult-launching of Hurricanes for convoy defence. A catapult for training volunteer pilots was erected at the airfield. With insufficient aircraft carriers available, there was the so-called "Air Gap" within which merchant shipping was out of reach of land-based aircraft on both sides of the Atlantic. As the predatory Focke-Wulf Fw 200 Condors could therefore operate with impunity, fighters launched by catapult from merchant ships were felt to be a potentially effective response. About 50 Hurricane Mk.Is were modified by General Aircraft for catapult launch, and 35 merchantmen were configured to carry catapults, with the first Atlantic crossings in April 1941. The Catapult Aircraft Merchantmen (CAM) and their so-called "Hurricats" soon proved their worth: Seven Condors were destroyed through 1941–43, while the deterrent effect was even more important.

In September 1941 he was posted as Commanding Officer, RAF Valley, although illness prevented him from fulfilling the post. From August 1942 until the end of the year, he served with Group HQ at Uxbridge. Three months as Commanding Officer at RAF Hawkinge followed before a transfer to No. 12 Group HQ as a supplementary squadron leader.

In December 1943 Strange was posted to No. 46 Group as Wing Commander, Operations. There he assisted in the planning for Operation Overlord, landing in Normandy himself on 15 June. He had six airstrips under his control in the expanding beachhead at this time. He was also responsible for the control and administration of a series of Temporary Staging Posts (TSP) supporting the Allied campaign. During the advance that followed the break-out from Normandy, Strange personally 'liberated' Château Lillois, 24 years after he had been the first to announce the departure of the Germans from there in 1918. In October 1944 Strange served with the HQ, 1st Allied Airborne Army. He was also at SHAEF Forward Headquarters in Reims on 6–7 May 1945 to witness negotiations for the German surrender on all fronts.

Strange eventually retired from the service in June 1945. For his wartime contribution Strange was made an Officer of the Order of the British Empire on 1 January 1945, and was awarded the American Bronze Star Medal in early 1946.

== Postwar civil aviation ==
He returned to farming but continued his links with civil aviation. He bought the Taylorcraft Auster Plus D light aircraft G-AHCR and flew it in several competitions, including the Wiltshire Flying Club's Thruxton Cup Race on 26 August 1950, averaging 103 miles per hour (166 km/h) over the 75 miles (121 km) route; the Daily Express sponsored South Coast Race on 16 September 1950, coming in 54th out of 61 entrants; and the 1950 Daily Express Challenge Air Trophy, at the age of 59, being the oldest of the 76 competitors. He continued to fly regularly and died peacefully in his sleep in 1966, aged 75.

In recognition of the high esteem in which he was held in the RAF and his important contribution to military aviation, the Squadron Briefing Room in the new No. 23 Squadron Headquarters building, which was officially opened by the AOC-in-C Strike Command on 2 April 1997, was named "The Strange Room".

His daughter, Susan Strange, was an eminent British scholar in international relations.

== Awards and citations ==
Distinguished Service Order

Lieut.-Col. Louis Arbon Strange, M.C., D.F.C.

For his exceptional services in organising his wing and his brilliant leadership on low bombing raids this officer was awarded the Distinguished Flying Cross not long ago. Since then, by his fine example and inspiring personal influence, he has raised his wing to still higher efficiency and morale, the enthusiasm displayed by the various squadrons for low-flying raids being most marked. On 30th October he accompanied one of these raids against an aerodrome; watching the work of his machines, he waited until they had finished and then dropped his bombs from one hundred feet altitude on hangars that were undamaged; he then attacked troops and transport in the vicinity of the aerodrome. While thus engaged he saw eight Fokkers flying above him; at once he climbed and attacked them single-handed; having driven one down out of control he was fiercely engaged by the other seven, but he maintained the combat until rescued by a patrol of our scouts.

— London Gazette, 7 February 1919

Military Cross

Second Lieutenant (temporary Captain) L. A. Strange, The Dorsetshire Regiment and Royal Flying Corps.

For gallantry and ability on reconnaissance and other duties on numerous occasions, especially on the occasion when he dropped three bombs from a height of only 200 feet on the railway junction at Courtrai; whilst being assailed by heavy rifle fire.

— London Gazette, 27 March 1915

Distinguished Flying Cross

Lieut.-Col. Louis Arbon Strange, M.C. (Dorset R).

To this officer must be given the main credit of the complete success attained in two recent bombing raids on important enemy aerodromes. In organising these raids his careful attention to detail and well thought-out plans were most creditable. During the operations themselves his gallantry in attack and fine leadership inspired all those taking part.

— London Gazette, 2 November 1918

Bar to the Distinguished Flying Cross

Pilot Officer Louis Arbon Strange, D.S.O., M.C., D.F.C. (78522), R.A.F. Volunteer Reserve.

Pilot Officer Strange was detailed to proceed from Hendon to Merville to act as ground control officer during the arrival and departure of various aircraft carrying food supplies. He displayed great skill and determination whilst under heavy bombing attacks and machine-gun fire at Merville, where he was responsible for the repair and successful despatch of two aircraft to England. In the last remaining aircraft, which was repaired under his supervision, he returned to Hendon, in spite of being repeatedly attacked by Messerschmitts until well out to sea. He had no guns in action and had never flown this type of aircraft previously, but his brilliant piloting enabled him to return with this much needed aircraft.

— London Gazette, 21 June 1940
