= Christchurch Airfield =

Airfield in Dorset, England

Coordinates: 50.73546°N 1.74541°W

Christchurch Airfield was located southeast of the A337/B3059 intersection in Somerford, Christchurch, Dorset, England.

It was a civil airfield starting from 1926. During World War II, it became RAF Christchurch, used by the Royal Air Force and the United States Army Air Forces Ninth Air Force. After the war, the airfield returned to civilian use and the airfield complex was then demolished in 1966.

== Before World War II ==
Flying at Christchurch started in July 1926, when Surrey Flying Services began offering five-shilling pleasure flights from an area known as "Burrysfield". In May 1928, the Hampshire Aero Club operated from the area. The next step was when Francis C. Fisher leased some open fields where he operated a flying facility in the summers until his lease ran out in 1932 by which time Fisher had flown over 19,000 passengers. In 1933, Sir Alan Cobham's Air Circus put on a show there attended by around 8,000 spectators. In the same year, the Rambler Air Station was established and airline services commenced on 14 May 1934 with Western Airways operating a de Havilland Dragon Rapide and the airfield was known as Christchurch Airport. In February 1935, the airfield temporarily became known as Bournemouth Airport – not to be confused with nearby Bournemouth Airport at Hurn.

== World War II ==
In World War II, the airfield became RAF Christchurch. The Air Defence Research and Development Establishment was built at the northeastern end of the airfield, and in May 1940, the RAF Special Duties Flight, operating an assortment of aircraft arrived to take part in the experiments with radar. The Airspeed factory was also built on part of the original airfield and began production of Horsa Mk I gliders, AS.10 Oxfords, and de Havilland Mosquitos for the RAF.

In 1943, the USAAF Ninth Air Force required several temporary advanced landing grounds along the southern English Channel coast prior to the Normandy invasion to provide tactical air support for the ground forces landing in France. Christchurch was provided to support this mission.

After the USAAF departure the airfield was returned to RAF control. In March 1945, control passed to RAF Transport Command. The main activities continued to be production (Mosquitos) by Airspeed, radar trials and glider pick-up training. In January 1946, control of the airfield passed to the Ministry of Aircraft Production.

== After World War II ==
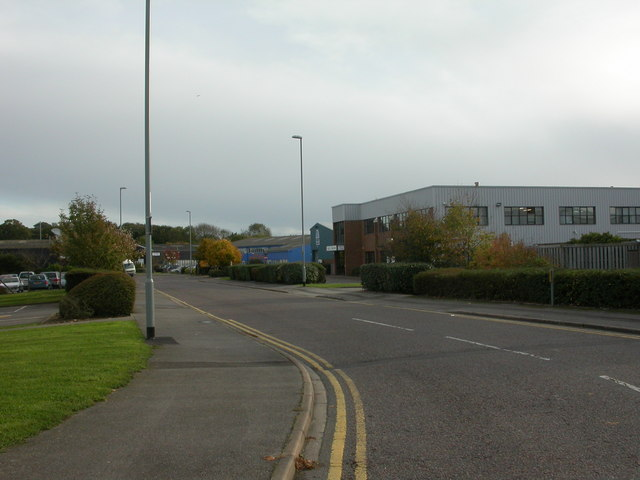
Airfield Way in Somerford – site of Christchurch Airfield

With the facility released from military control, civilian flying returned to Christchurch. The Christchurch Aero Club operated from the north side while on the southwestern tip of the field the RAF's 622 Gliding School operated for many years from a hangar just outside the airfield boundary.

In 1954, the Military Experimental Engineering Establishment from Christchurch laid a Tarmac runway on the site of the World War II wire and PSP (pierced steel planking) runway. The main beneficiaries of this exercise was the De Havilland factory which was producing Vampire, Venom, Sea Venom and Sea Vixen jet fighters and the Airspeed Ambassador twin piston-engined airliners.

Following the closure of De Havilland factory in 1962, the use of the airfield rapidly declined. The staffed air traffic control tower was closed in July 1963 and the Aero Club closed in 1964. The airfield officially closed at the end of 1964, although the occasional aircraft used the airfield until around 1974.

Today, the airfield site has been developed by the urban areas of Somerford/Mudeford. It is now a mix of housing and industry with nothing remaining of the airfield except some of the Airspeed buildings and streets named after aircraft.
