= Rosieres-en-Santerre Airfield =

Former World War II airfield

Rosieres-en-Santerre Airfield Advanced Landing Ground B-87
- Rosieres-en-Santerre Airfield (France)

Site information
- Type: Military Airfield
- Controlled by: Royal Air Force, 1939-1940; 1944-1945; Luftwaffe (National Socialist), 1940-1944; United States Army Air Forces, 1945

Location
- Coordinates: 49°48′17″N 002°44′45″E

Site history
- In use: 1939-November 1945
- Battles/wars: Western Front (World War II)

Rosieres-en-Santerre Airfield is a former World War II airfield, located 1.8 km east of Rosières-en-Santerre in the Picardy region, France.

== History ==
Rosieres-en-Santerre Airfield was built by the Royal Air Force for the British Expeditionary Force in France during 1939 as part of the buildup of British Forces after the 1938 Munich Agreement with Nazi Germany and subsequent tensions between Great Britain and France against Germany. The RAF built three runways: 1630x50meters; 1650x50meters; 1620x50meters. The first two were built (crossing each other) between the villages of Méharicourt and Maucourt, the third was to their north. The airfield opened on 18 October 1939, and was home to 185 Squadron and 57S Squadron (Blenheims). Both squadrons served at the airfield during the "Phoney War" and ultimately the Battle of France in the spring of 1940.

With the German advance closing in on the air base, the British withdrew from the airfield on 17 May 1940. It was sized by the Luftwaffe during the Battle of France and became a German Fliegerhorst. The Luftwaffe immediately began preparing for the Battle of Britain and the airfield became home to III.Gruppe/Kampfgeschwader 1 (III./KG 1), an attack unit flying the Heinkel He 111H medium bomber. Between 1940 and 1941 different units of KG 1 stayed at the base for longer or shorter periods of time. By June 1941 KG 1 left for duty at the eastern front. Between spring 1943 and summer 1944 the airfield hosted I.Gruppe/Schlachtgeschwader 10 (I./SKG 10) with Focke-Wulf Fw 190.

It is unclear when the airfield was liberated, or when it was put into service by the Allies, but it must have been around August/September 1944. On 2 February 1945 the airfield became home to RAF 21 Squadron, 464 Squadron (RAAF) and 487 Squadron (RNZAF). They stayed until they left for Brussels-Melsbroek Airfield (B-58) on 17 April 1945.

When the war ended the airfield became home to Martin B-26 Marauders of the 387th Bombardment Group. They moved in on 24 May until they were withdrawn to the United States on 1 November 1945. The airfield closed shortly after that.

Today, nothing remains of the former airfield. Its runways and most of its taxiways have been broken up and returned to agricultural use. Parts of some taxiways remain in use as local roads.
