= Caboolture Airfield =

Airport in Queensland, Australia

Caboolture Airport
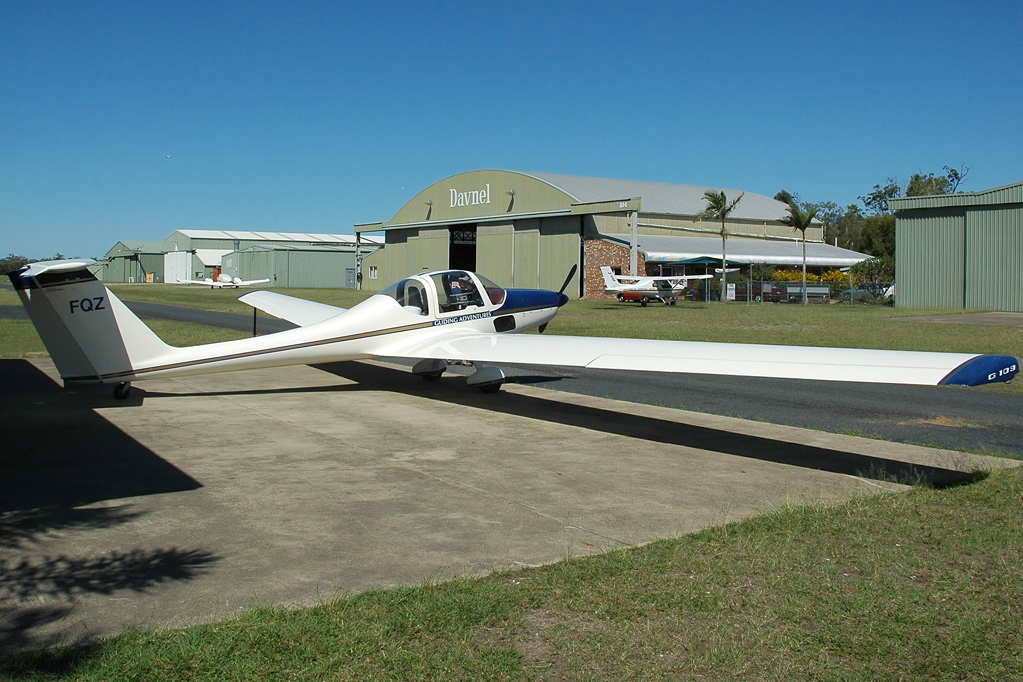
- IATA: CA3; ICAO: YCAB

Summary
- Airport type: Public
- Owner: Queensland Government
- Operator: Caboolture Aero Club Inc
- Serves: Moreton Bay Region, Queensland
- Location: Caboolture, Queensland
- Elevation AMSL: 40 ft (12 m)
- Coordinates: 27°04.6′S 152°59.2′E
- Website: www.cabooltureaeroclub.com.au

Map
- Location of airport in Queensland

Runways
Direction	Length		Surface
Direction	ft	m	Surface
11/29	3,993	1,210	Grass
06/24	2,709	821	Grass

Caboolture Airfield is an aerodrome catering to general aviation and ultralight aircraft located in Caboolture, Queensland, Australia, approximately 55 km (34 mi) north of the state capital Brisbane, adjacent to the Bruce Highway. The airfield is maintained and operated by the Caboolture Aero Club Incorporated and shares a large training area with nearby Caloundra Airport and Redcliffe Airport. The airfield is a popular site for the restoration of historic aircraft and a number of associated businesses are located onsite.

== History and overview ==
An airstrip was first established at Caboolture prior to 1965 by Norman Douglas Thurecht who would later be a founding member of the Redcliffe Aero Club, after being denied permission to construct an airport at the present site of the Redcliffe Aerodrome owing to a lack of radar coverage in an area with close proximity to the busy Archerfield and Eagle Farm airports serving the city of Brisbane. Following the construction of Redcliffe Aerodrome, the Caboolture airstrip was abandoned and its operations moved to the new facility.

The present site of Caboolture Airfield is held by lease from the Queensland Government to Caboolture Aero Club. The Moreton Bay Regional Council acts as custodian of the land on behalf of the Queensland Government. Since its inception, the Caboolture Aero Club has owned and operated the site. The Brisbane Valley Gliding Club began operating from the airfield circa 1990, with the club changing its name to Caboolture Gliding Club in May 1991 and establishing its main base at Caboolture.

The current lease arrangement for the airfield land is due to expire in 2034.

== Operations ==
The primary user of the airport is the Caboolture Aero Club, however several other flying clubs also are based at the field. These include the Caboolture Gliding Club and Caboolture Microlights, a Recreational Aviation Australia accredited flight training organisation. Fixed wing and helicopter flight training is available onsite through several providers including Airwork Helicopters, Aero Dynamic Flight Academy and Caboolture Recreational Aviation.

In addition to general aviation, recreational and flight training users, the airport is a popular facility for the servicing and restoration of vintage aircraft. A number of organisations operate from Caboolture, including the Australian Aviation Heritage Centre (Queensland) Incorporated (formerly the Beaufort Restoration Group), and Complete Aircraft Care. The vintage aviation community has attracted fly-ins and airshow events to the airport, notably hosting the Queensland Vintage Aeroplane Group's Festival of Flight in 2001 and 2011.

The airfield is also home to the Caboolture Warplane and Heritage Museum. Included in their display is a collection of warbird and other vintage aircraft in flying condition. Currently, the collection includes a P-51D Mustang, SNJ and Winjeel as well as a French built World War I Nieuport 17 fighter, as well as displays of aviation memorabilia and aircraft engines.

Near the warplane museum is The Australian Vintage Aviation Society (TAVAS) Aviation Museum.

== Airport facilities ==
The airfield has two grass runways, both of which operate with a displaced threshold to allow aircraft to sufficiently clear the Bruce Highway and local roads. The primary strip is 11/29 which has an available landing distance measuring 1,210 m (3,970 ft). A short sealed area exists at the runway 11 threshold stretching approximately 250m. A secondary strip aligned 06/24 has an available distance of 821 m (2,694 ft) for landings. Use of runway 24 is generally discouraged due to the proximity of Caboolture Hospital on this heading. Aircraft refuelling is available. There is no control tower at the airport and pilots are required to co-ordinate aircraft movements using a Common Traffic Advisory Frequency (CTAF). The nearest radio navigation aid for aircraft is the Brisbane VOR/DME installation, 18.9 nautical miles (35.0 km) to the south.

While the airport charges no landing fees for visiting aircraft, a number of hazards exist which make Caboolture challenging for pilots who are unfamiliar with the facilities. Significant bird and wildlife hazards exist on the runways, due in part to the airfield not being fenced and in close proximity to a landfill site. During periods of heavy rain, the unsealed taxiways are prone to becoming waterlogged with a possibility of aircraft becoming bogged.

== Accidents and incidents ==
- On 1 October 2012, vintage de Havilland DH.84 Dragon Riama, based at Caboolture crashed 14 km (8.7 mi) north of Borumba Dam on the Sunshine Coast killing all six people on board. At the time Riama was one of only four airworthy examples of the DH.84 in the world. The aircraft was returning to Caboolture from an airshow at Monto. The final accident report by the Australian Transport Safety Bureau (ATSB) was released on 19 December 2013. The ATSB stated that the pilot was not qualified in, and the aircraft not equipped for instrument flight and "... the pilot radioed air traffic control (ATC) and requested navigation assistance, advising that the aircraft was in cloud." They found that: "With no or limited visual references available in and near cloud, it would have been very difficult for the pilot to maintain control of the aircraft. After maintaining control in such conditions for about an hour, and being unable to navigate away from the mountain range, the pilot most likely became spatially disoriented and lost control of the aircraft before it impacted the ground."
- On 22 March 2014, a Cessna 206 belonging to Adrenalin Skydivers crashed shortly after take-off and caught fire, killing the five occupants on board.
- On 28 July 2023 a privately owned Jabiru J430 and a Piper Pawnee of the Caboolture Gliding Club collided at the crossing of the airfield's two runways. Both occupants of the Jabiru were killed while the pilot of the Pawnee was uninjured. The ATSB released a preliminary report on the incident but investigations are ongoing.

== Gallery ==
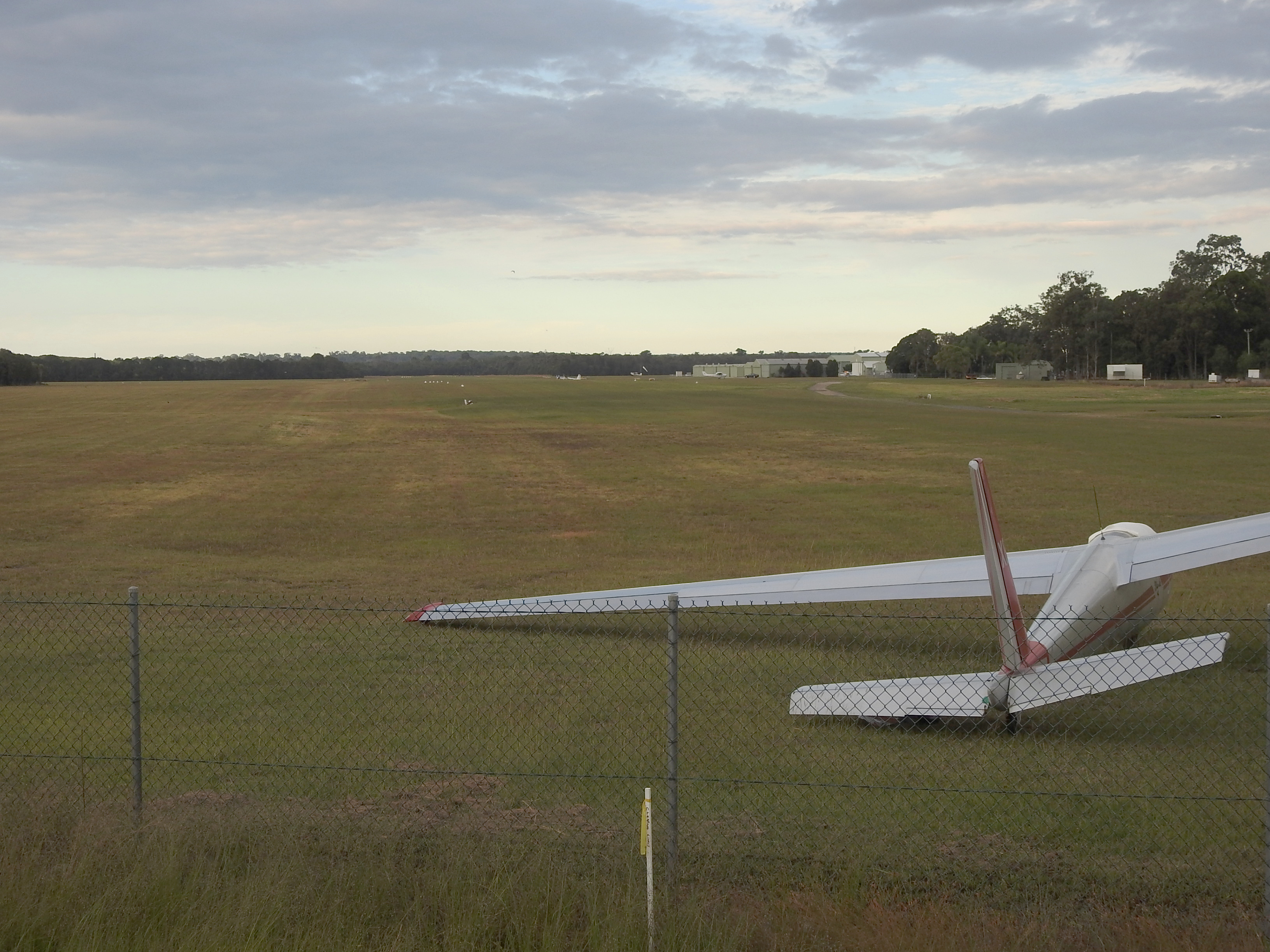
Caboolture Airport from the western approach (2021).

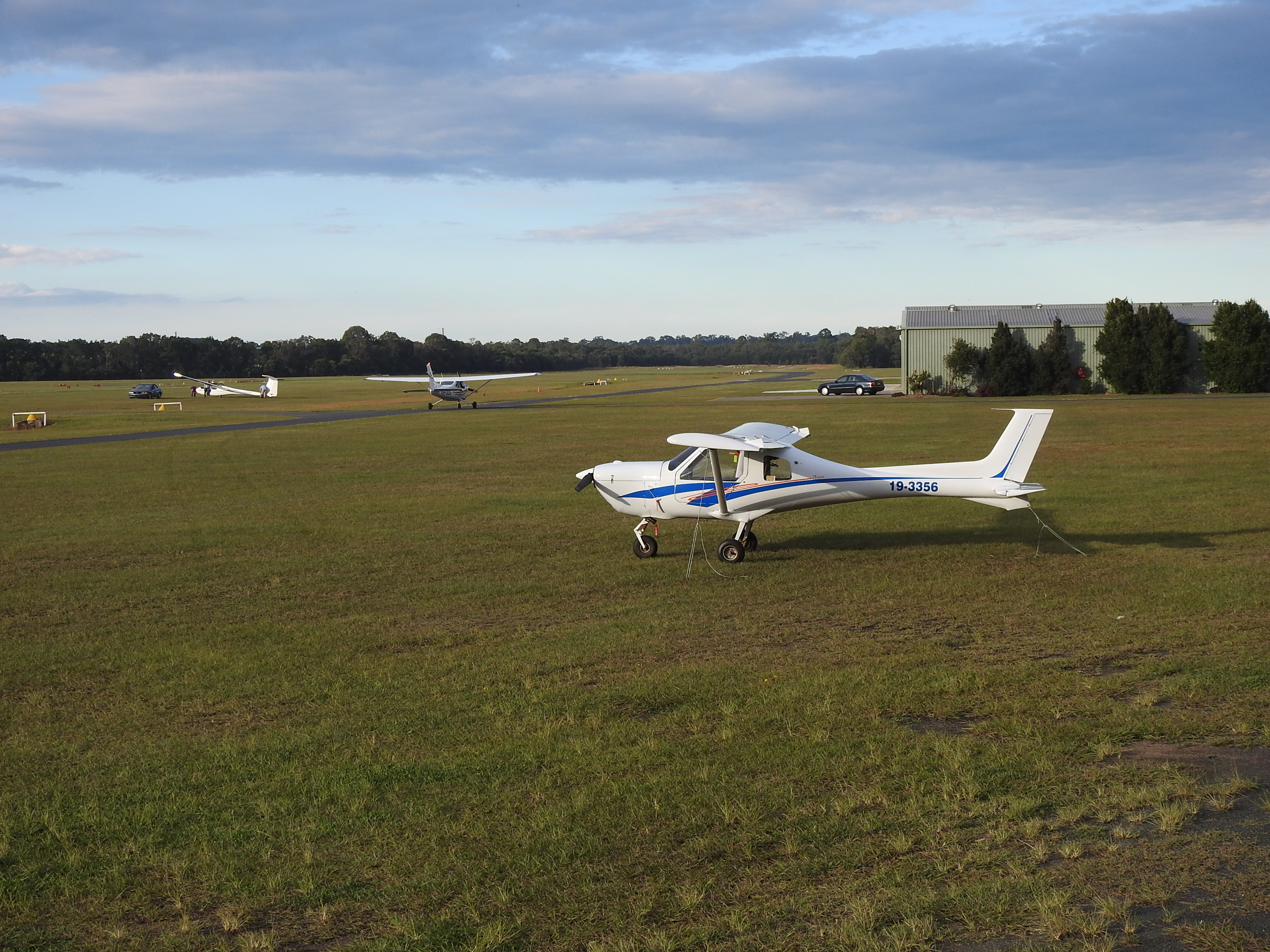
Taxi lane (2021).

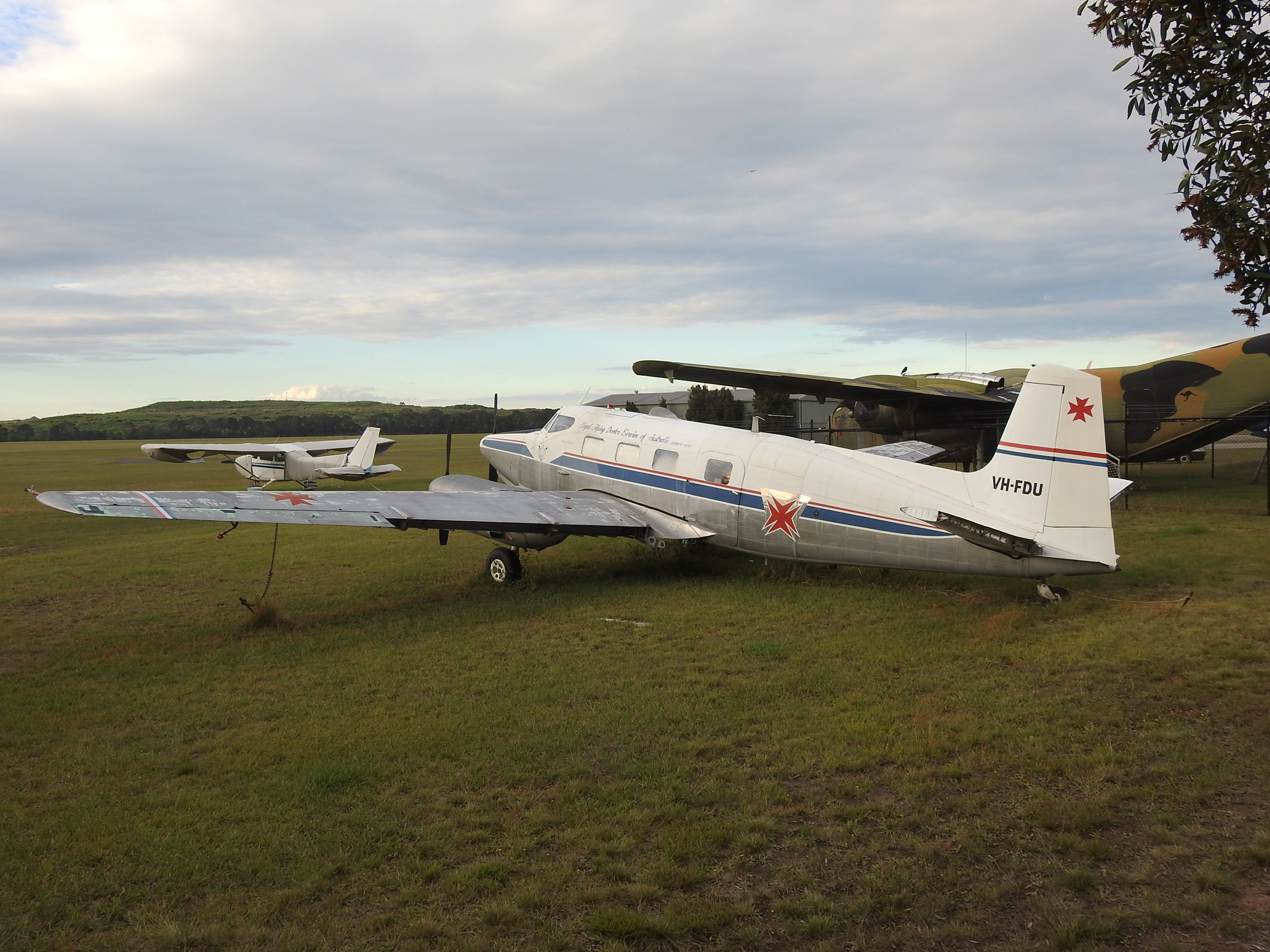
Old Royal Flying Doctor Service VH-FDU 'George Simpson' de Havilland Australia DHA-3 Mk.3a Drover aircraft (2021).

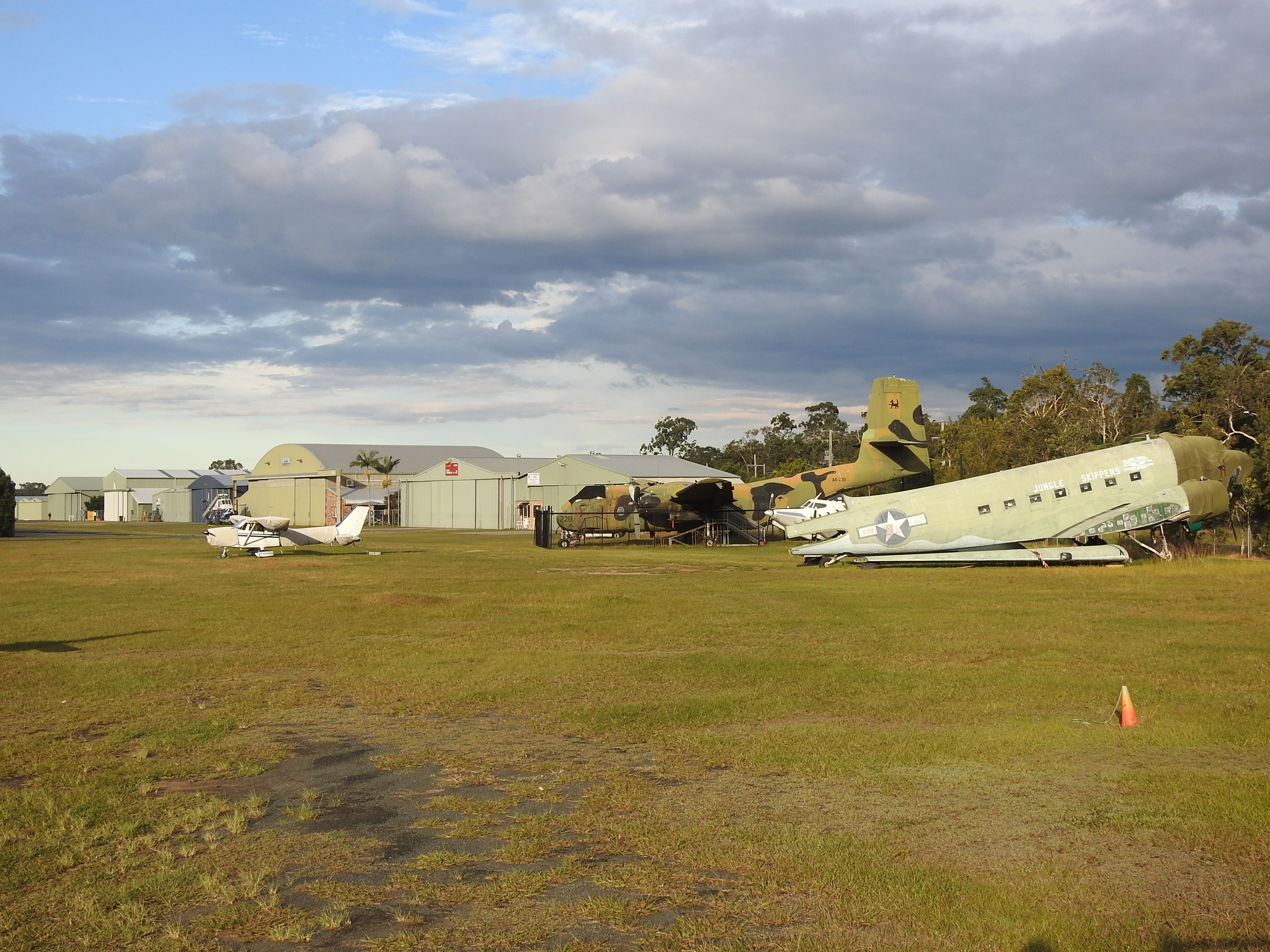
Caribou A4-228 at the airport (2021).

== See also ==
- Queensland Air Museum, Caloundra
