= Innisfail Airport =

Innisfail (Mundoo) Aerodrome
- IATA: IFL; ICAO: YIFL

Summary
- Airport type: Public
- Operator: Cassowary Coast Regional Council
- Location: Innisfail, Queensland
- Time zone: AEST (UTC+10:00)
- Elevation AMSL: 46 ft / 14 m
- Coordinates: 17°33′31″S 146°00′42″E

Map
- Location in Queensland

Runways
Direction	Length		Surface
Direction	m	ft	Surface
14/32	1,353	4,439	Asphalt
03/21	1,332	4,370	Clay
- Sources: Australian AIP and aerodrome chart

Innisfail Airport (IATA: IFL, ICAO: YIFL), also known as Mundoo Aerodrome, is in Mundoo, Queensland, Australia.

== History ==
The site for the airport was chosen on 20 November 1936. The estimated funds of £1145 for construction were allocated before acquiring the land.

In July it was reported that the Johnstone Shire Council had proposed to borrow £1250 for construction costs.

on 29 August 1938 at 9:30, a De Havilland DH.84 Dragon crashed, killing the pilot and four passengers with one survivor. The flight was operated by North Queensland Airways. On final approach to Innisfail Airport, the pilot saw a tractor on the runway and initiated a go around procedure. The airplane stalled and crashed short of the runway, bursting into flames. The cause of the crash was pilot error. He had never flown a De Havilland DH.84 Dragon.

Innisfail Airport opened publicly on 12 August 1951 to a crowd of around 3,000 people.

== See also ==
- List of airports in Queensland
