= 2012 Queensland DH.84 Dragon crash =

Aviation accident in Australia

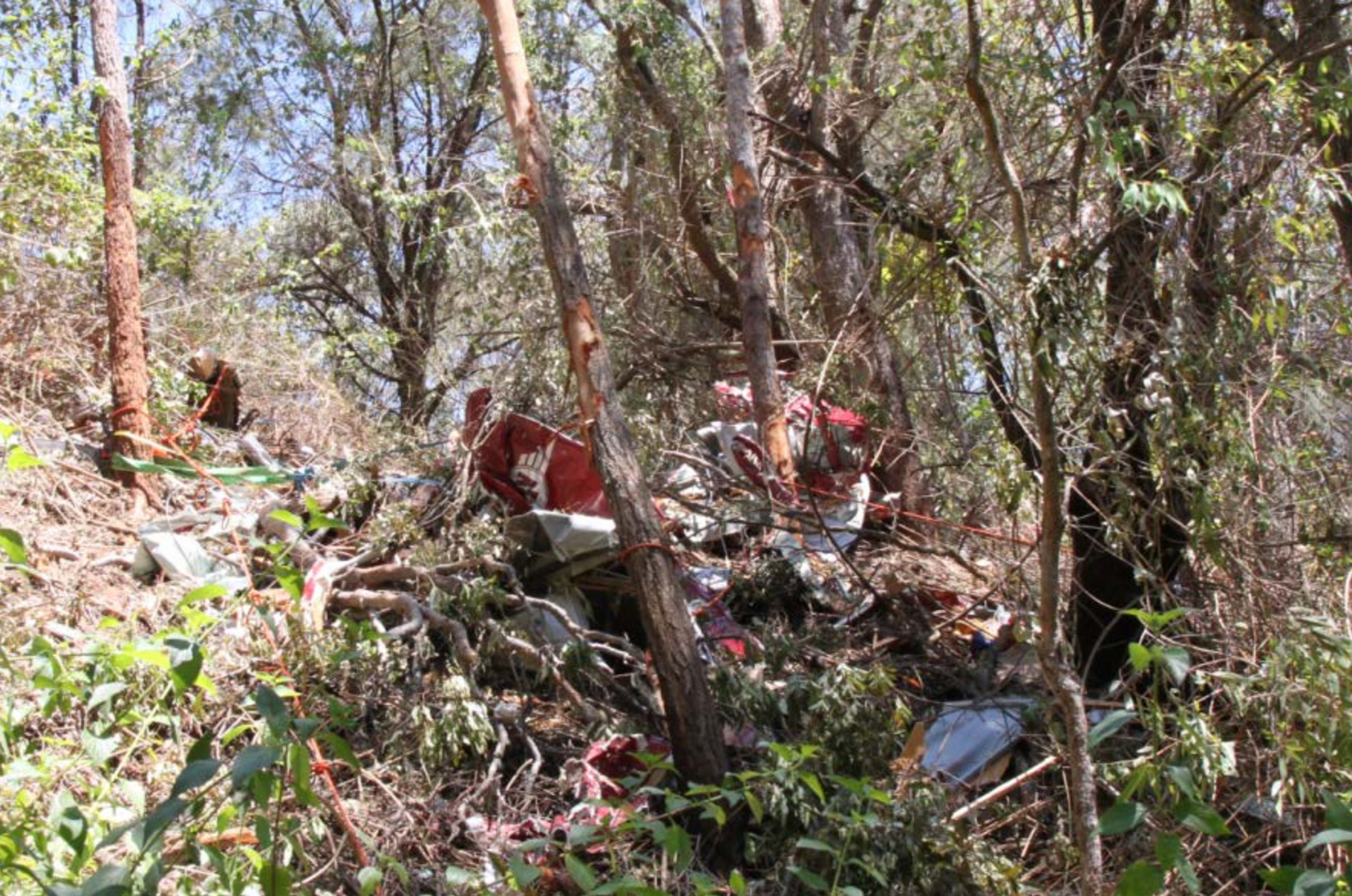
- The wreckage of the aircraft

Accident
- Date: October 1, 2012
- Summary: Loss of control in poor weather
- Site: Upper Kandanga, Queensland, Australia; 26°27′21″S 152°27′15″E

Aircraft
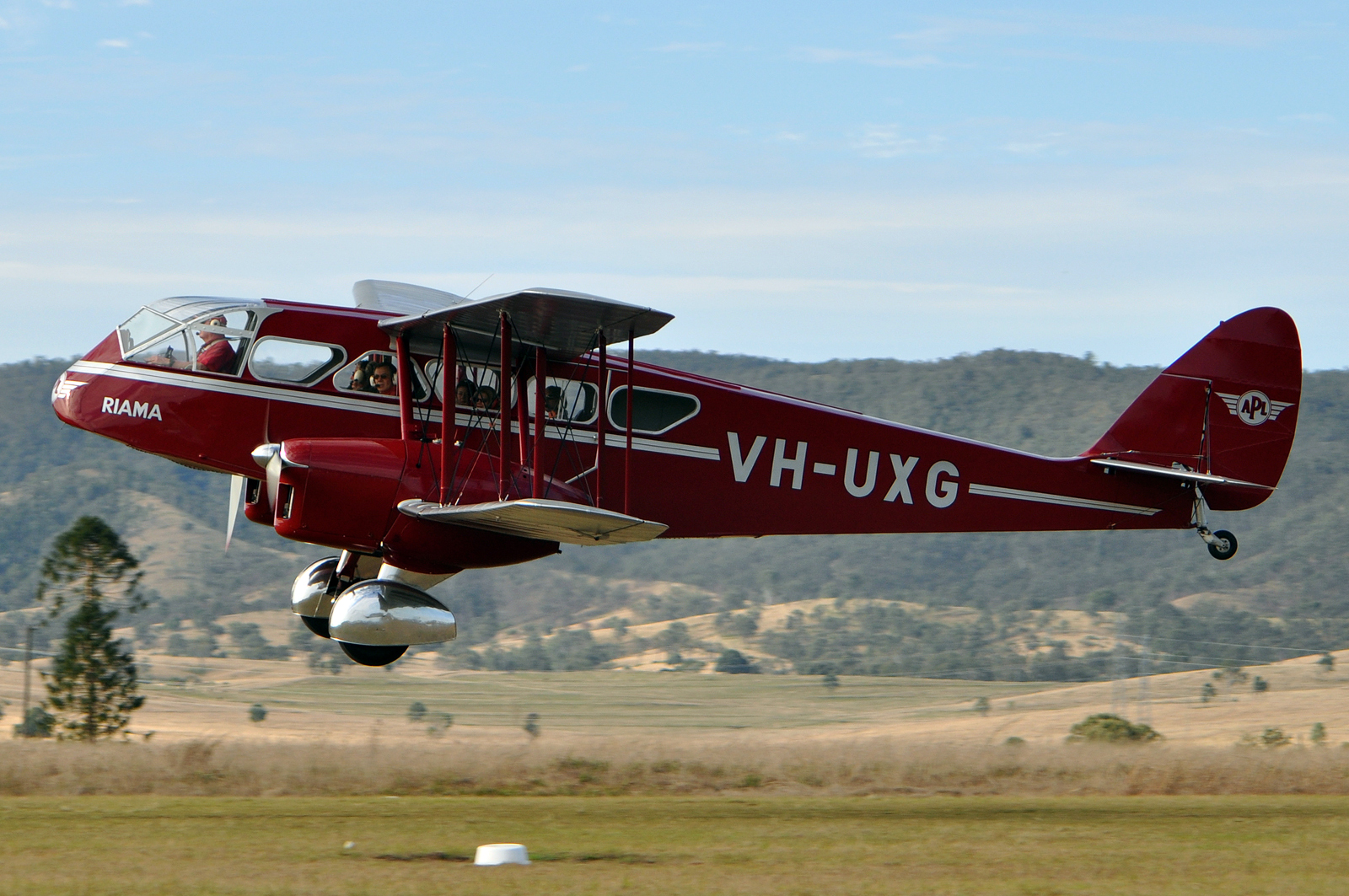
- VH-UXG, the aircraft involved in the accident, seen in 2010
- Aircraft type: de Havilland DH.84 Dragon
- Aircraft name: Riama
- Registration: VH-UXG
- Flight origin: Monto, Queensland, Australia
- Destination: Caboolture Airfield, Queensland, Australia
- Occupants: 6
- Passengers: 5
- Crew: 1
- Fatalities: 6
- Survivors: 0

On 1 October 2012, Riama, a 1934 vintage de Havilland DH.84 Dragon passenger aircraft, crashed in Queensland, Australia, while flying from Monto to Caboolture. Radio contact was lost about an hour after the pilot reported to be in cloud with zero visibility. The wreckage was found in heavily wooded, hilly terrain two days later. The pilot and five passengers were killed in the accident.

The investigation by the Australian Transport Safety Bureau (ATSB) found that the pilot most likely fell victim to spatial disorientation and lost control of the aircraft. He was not qualified for instrument flight and the aircraft was not equipped for such operations. The weather at the time was reported as low clouds and rain.

== Accident ==
The aircraft departed from the Norra-Aus Fly-In airshow in Monto a few minutes after 11:00 on a direct track towards Caboolture carrying the pilot and five non-paying passengers. The weather for the flight was expected to be VFR (visual flight rules) conditions with good visibility, high clouds and light winds. At 13:15, the aircraft contacted air traffic control, reporting an approximate position 69 km north of Caboolture and requesting assistance with navigation.

Shortly after, the pilot issued a distress call as the aircraft had entered thick cloud. Controllers in Brisbane then communicated positional information to the aircraft directly and relayed via other pilots in the area due to difficulties with radio reception. A friend of one of the passengers aboard Riama received a phone call from the aircraft, reporting that they were lost in cloud and unable to maintain altitude at around 13:20.

Over the next hour, witnesses in the area around the crash site reported seeing the aircraft flying in and out of cloud at low level. At 13:48, the pilot reported he had one hour of fuel remaining and the last transmission from the aircraft came at 14:04. Neither the aircraft or the pilot were equipped or certified to fly without visual reference to the ground.

A major search and rescue operation was coordinated by the Australian Maritime Safety Authority (AMSA), involving as many as 15 helicopters as well as a specialized fixed wing aircraft flown in from Melbourne. The original search area covered an area of some 1500 square kilometers, made difficult by the hilly terrain and dense vegetation. Local residents on motorcycles also offered to help search remote trails. Police officers on horseback also joined the search. AMSA revealed that an emergency beacon had been activated on the aircraft about half an hour before the last contact, but the signal had since been lost. The wreckage was discovered just below a ridge line near Lake Borumba, 36 km south west of Gympie on 3 October with none of the occupants having survived the crash.

== Aircraft ==
At the time of the accident, Riama was one of four airworthy examples of the DH.84 Dragon aircraft in the world. After sitting disassembled in a hangar for many years, the aircraft was restored at Murwillumbah Airport by vintage aircraft specialists Mothcair between 1998 and 2002.

The aircraft was purchased by Des Porter, the accident pilot, who learned that parts used in the tail section of the aircraft had been sourced from another Dragon, also named Riama, which had been owned by his father but was damaged in a 1952 crash landing at Archerfield Airport near Brisbane. Porter himself had survived another accident in a Dragon at the age of 11 which killed his father and older brother in 1954.

The distinctive red biplane had become a popular attraction at airshows and flying events around Australia. It was reported that on the weekend prior to the accident, Porter had raised some $15,000 for a Bundaberg based rescue helicopter service by offering joy-flights in Riama.

== Investigation ==
An investigation into the Riama crash was carried out by the Australian Transport Safety Bureau (ATSB), with the final findings released in December 2013. The preliminary findings showed that, contrary to some media reports that the aircraft ran out of fuel, at least one engine was operating at the time of the crash, and fuel was found in the tanks. The ATSB determined the time of impact to be approximately 14:21, 17 minutes after the last communication with the aircraft. The impact was determined to be not survivable.

=== Final report ===
The final accident report by the ATSB was released on 19 December 2013. The ATSB stated that:

The pilot was not qualified and the aircraft not equipped for instrument flight. The weather on the coast and extending inland included low clouds and rain.

and

... the pilot radioed air traffic control (ATC) and requested navigation assistance, advising that the aircraft was in cloud.

They found that:

With no or limited visual references available in and near cloud, it would have been very difficult for the pilot to maintain control of the aircraft. After maintaining control in such conditions for about an hour, and being unable to navigate away from the mountain range, the pilot most likely became spatially disoriented and lost control of the aircraft before it impacted the ground."
