= De Havilland Puss Moth =

Light utility aircraft built between 1929 and 1933

DH.80A Puss Moth
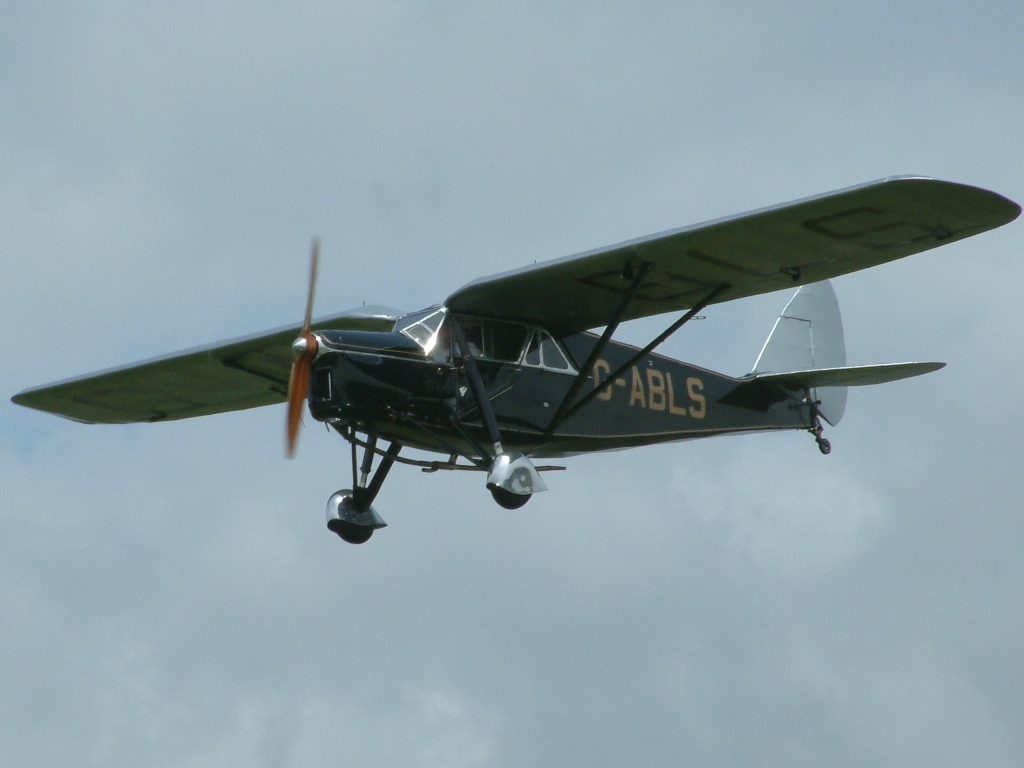
- de Havilland DH.80A Puss Moth G-ABLS first registered in 1931

General information
- Type: Light utility aircraft
- Manufacturer: de Havilland
- Number built: 284

History
- Manufactured: 1929–1933
- Introduction date: March 1930
- First flight: 9 September 1929

The de Havilland DH.80A Puss Moth is a British three-seater high-wing monoplane aeroplane designed and built by the de Havilland Aircraft Company between 1929 and 1933. It flew at a speed approaching 124 mph (200 km/h), making it one of the highest-performance private aircraft of its era. It was named after the puss moth (pronounced /pʊs/, puuss), a species of Eurasian woodland moth.

== Design history ==
The unnamed DH.80 prototype which first flew in September 1929 was designed for the flourishing private flying movement in the United Kingdom. It was a streamlined all-wooden aircraft fitted with the new de Havilland Gipsy III inverted inline engine that gave unimpeded vision across the nose without the protruding cylinder heads of the earlier Gipsy II engine.

After the prototype was tested, the aircraft was redesigned with a fabric-covered steel-tube fuselage and as such redesignated the DH.80A Puss Moth. The first production aircraft flew in March 1930 and was promptly sent on a sales tour of Australia and New Zealand. Orders came quickly, and in the three years of production ending in March 1933, 259 were manufactured in England. An additional 25 aircraft were built by de Havilland Canada. Most were fitted with the 130 hp (97 kW) Gipsy Major engine that gave slightly better performance.

The Puss Moth was replaced on the production line by the de Havilland DH.85 Leopard Moth that, with a plywood fuselage, was both cheaper to build, and lighter weight. Being lighter, the Leopard Moth had better performance on the same rather modest 130 hp (97 kW) Gipsy Major engine.

== Technical faults ==
Early in its career, the DH.80A was plagued by a series of fatal crashes, the most famous being to Australian aviator Bert Hinkler while crossing the Alps in CF-APK on 7 January 1933. The cause was eventually pinned down to "flutter" caused by turbulence leading to wing failure – this was corrected by stiffening the front strut with a jury strut to the rear wing root fitting.

== Operational history ==
Most DH.80As were used as private aircraft, though many also flew commercially with small air charter firms for passenger and mail carrying. Seating was normally two, although in commercial use two passengers could be carried in slightly staggered seats with the rear passenger's legs beside the forward passenger seat. The wings folded backwards for storage, pivoting on the rear spar root fitting and the V-strut root fitting, a system used on other de Havilland light aircraft of the period.

One aircraft took part in the Challenge 1934 European tourist plane contest, but dropped out because of an engine fault on one of the last stages.

Surviving British civilian aircraft were impressed into service during the Second World War to act as communication aircraft. A few survive into the early 21st century.

=== Record breaking flights ===
During the early 1930s, DH.80s were used for a number of record breaking flights. In early 1931, Nevill Vintcent made the first flight from England to Ceylon in G-AAXJ. On 25 May 1931 Capt James Douglas Mail flew in his Puss Moth G–ABIU named Baby Tank from Croydon to Bulawayo, taking 8 days according to his logbook via Pisa to Rome then on to north Africa and down the east coast, arriving 8 days later. Total flying time was 73hrs 50mins.

In July and August 1931 Amy Johnson made an eight-day flight with her co-pilot, Jack Humphreys, to Moscow and Tokyo in G-AAZV, named Jason II, completing the leg to Moscow in one day.

Late in 1931, the Australian Bert Hinkler piloted the Canadian-built CF-APK on a series of important flights including New York City to Jamaica, Jamaica to Venezuela, and a 22-hour, west–east crossing of the South Atlantic, only the second solo transatlantic crossing.

In November 1931, 19-year-old Peggy Salaman set out in G-ABEH named Good Hope, to beat the record for the flight from London to Cape Town. With Gordon Store, her co-pilot and navigator, she arrived in Cape Town at 5.40 a.m. beating the previous record set up by Glen Kidston by more than one day.

Jim Mollison, in Puss Moth G-ABXY, The Heart's Content, completed the first solo east-west Atlantic crossing in August 1932, from Portmarnock Strand near Dublin to New Brunswick, Canada, and the first east–west crossing of the South Atlantic from Lympne Aerodrome to Natal, Brazil in February 1933. His wife, Amy Johnson, made record flights between England and Cape Town using G-ACAB, Desert Cloud in 1932. C. J. Melrose flew VH-UQO, named My Hildegarde in the 1934 MacRobertson Air Race. They finished overall seventh and second on handicap in a time of 10 days 16 hours.

In 1933, a Puss Moth was used as the reconnaissance plane in the Houston–Mount Everest flight expedition, though the recording-breaking flight over Mount Everest was performed by different aircraft types.

In 1934, Australian pilot Jimmy Melrose flew DH80A Puss Moth VH-UQO and christened My Hildergarde to England just after his 21st birthday to compete in the 1934 MacRobertson Air Race, reaching Croydon in a record 8 days, 9 hours. He finished the race in sixth place in 10 days, 16 hours, earning second on handicap. He was the youngest, and only solo, flier to complete the course.

=== Accidents and incidents ===
- On 5 May 1931, English aviator Glen Kidston was killed when his Puss Moth broke up in mid-air while flying through a dust storm over the Drakensberg escarpment of South Africa.
- On 27 July 1932, Puss Moth G-ABDH, owned by Brian Lewis and Company and piloted by Bruce Bossom, son of politician Alfred Bossom, encountered thundery weather and turbulence en route from Heston to Hamble. The plane broke up in mid air and crashed near Hindhead, killing all three occupants.
- On 18 September 1932, Puss Moth VH-UPM of New England Airways crashed at Byron Bay, New South Wales, while travelling from Sydney to Brisbane. Three people were killed, including World War I fighter ace Les Holden (travelling as a passenger).
- On 7 January 1933, Puss Moth CF-APK named Karohi, crashed in the Pratomagno Alps, Italy killing famed Australian pioneering and trailbrazing aviator Bert Hinkler while on an attempt to break the England to Australia solo flight record.
- On 20 July 1936 a Puss Moth crashed on takeoff at the marina adjacent to Boca do Inferno, in Cascais, Portugal. The crash killed the passenger General Jose Sanjurjo y Sacanell, who was travelling to Spain to assume command of the Nationalists in the Spanish Civil War. The pilot, Spanish playboy and aviator Juan Antonio Ansaldo, survived the crash.
- On 19 January 1937, Puss Moth VH-UPQ of North Queensland Airways crashed into the sea on approach to Cairns, Queensland, en route from Cooktown. One person was killed and two badly injured.
- On 27 August 1941, an Airlines of Australia Puss Moth VH-UQL crashed in the Coen River near Coen, Queensland, while flying from Thursday Island to Cairns. Three people were killed, including former Australian senator Charles Hardy.

== Variants ==
- de Havilland DH.80 : Prototype, 120 hp (89 kW) Gipsy III engine.
- de Havilland DH.80A Puss Moth : Two- or three-seat light aircraft, mostly with 130 hp (97 kW) Gipsy Major engine.

== Operators ==
Australia

- Air Lines of Australia
- Marshalls Airways
- New England Airways
- North Queensland Airways
- Qantas

Belgian Congo

- Force Publique

Canada

- Royal Canadian Air Force

Independent State of Croatia

- Air Force of the Independent State of Croatia

Germany

- Luftwaffe (small numbers)

India

- Air India

Iraq

- Iraqi Air Force

Kenya

- Wilson Airways

New Zealand

- Royal New Zealand Air Force
  - No. 42 Squadron RNZAF

South Africa

- South African Air Force
- South African Airways
- Union Airways

Spain

- LAPE

Spanish State

- Spanish Air Force

United Kingdom

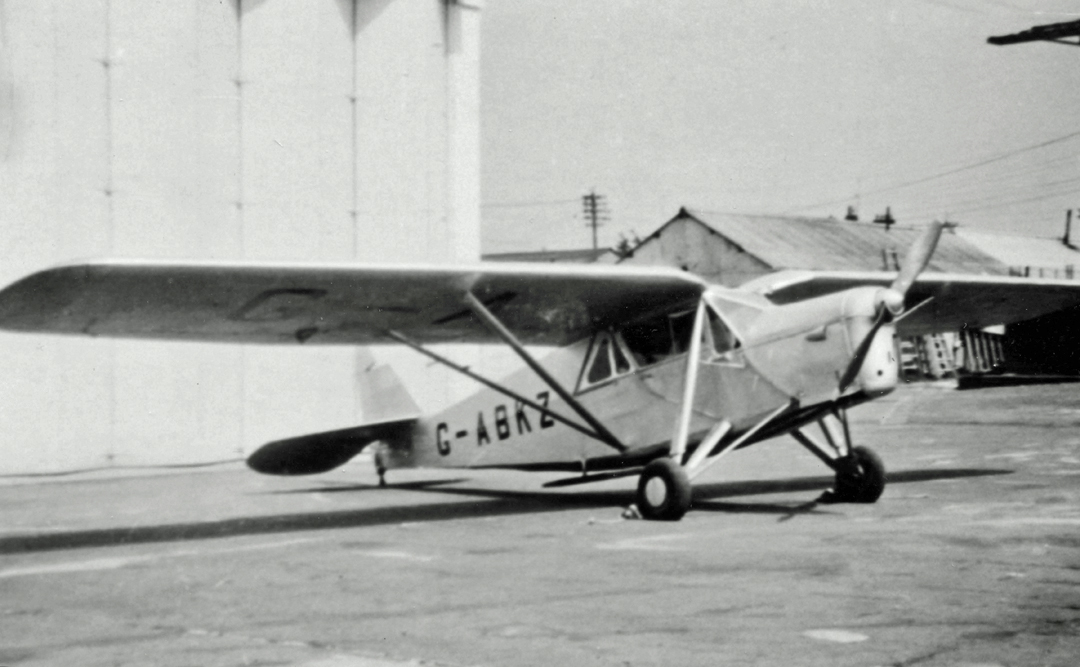
DH.80A taxi aircraft of East Anglian Flying Services at Manchester (Ringway) Airport in June 1948

- Aberdeen Airways
- Air Commerce
- Air Taxis
- Birkett Air Service
- British Air Navigation
- East Anglian Flying Services
- Hillman's Airways
- Olley Air Service
- Royal Air Force
  - No. 510 Squadron RAF
- Royal Navy 1 aircraft impressed

United States
United States Navy One used by the United States Embassy in London.
Kingdom of Yugoslavia

- Aeroput

== Specifications (DH.80) ==
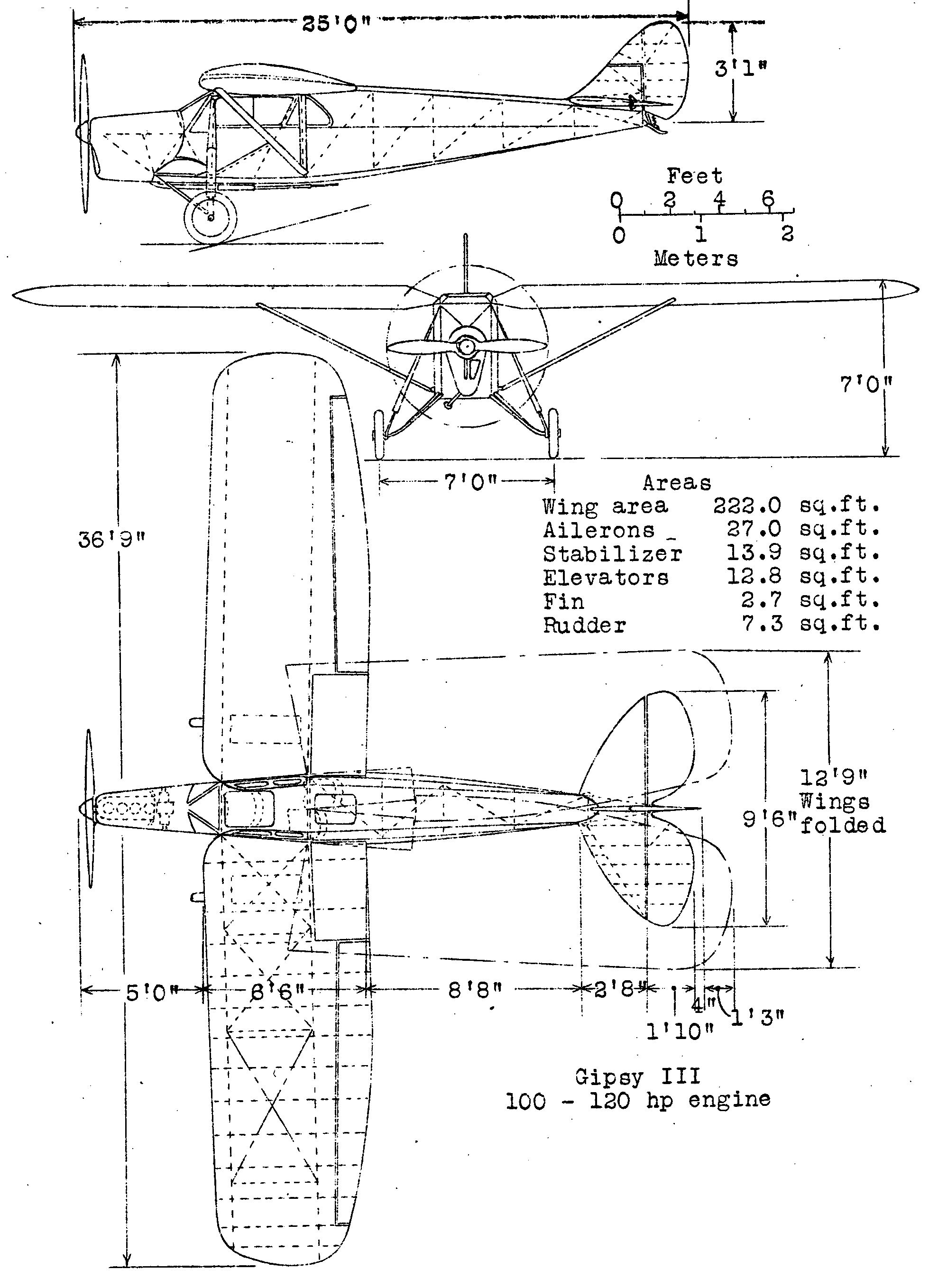
De Havilland Puss Moth 3-view drawing from NACA Aircraft Circular No.117

Data from British Civil Aircraft since 1919 (Volume 2).

General characteristics

- Crew: 1
- Capacity: 1 or 2 pax
- Length: 25 ft 0 in (7.62 m)
- Wingspan: 36 ft 9 in (11.20 m)
- Height: 7 ft 0 in (2.13 m)
- Wing area: 222 sq ft (20.6 m^{2})
- Empty weight: 1,265 lb (574 kg)
- Gross weight: 2,050 lb (930 kg)
- Powerplant: 1 × de Havilland Gipsy III 4-cylinder air-cooled inverted in-line piston engine, 120 hp (89 kW)
- Propellers: 2-bladed wooden fixed-pitch propeller

Performance

- Maximum speed: 128 mph (206 km/h, 111 kn)
- Range: 300 mi (480 km, 260 nmi)
- Service ceiling: 17,500 ft (5,300 m)
- Rate of climb: 630 ft/min (3.2 m/s)

== See also ==
Related development

- DH.85 Leopard Moth

Aircraft of comparable role, configuration, and era

- RWD-5
- Desoutter Mk.II

Related lists

- List of aircraft of the Spanish Republican Air Force
