= North Queensland Airways =

Australian aviation company

North Queensland Airways Pty. Ltd. (NQA) was an Australian company established on 7 May 1936 to operate air services in Queensland, Australia.

== History ==
With its headquarters at Cairns, Queensland it initially had a share capital of 50,000 pounds in one pound shares, and the managing director and chief pilot was Thomas Horatio McDonald. As well as operating a flying school at Cairns using De Havilland Gipsy Moth aircraft, it began scheduled flights on 1 June 1936 operating between Cairns and Innisfail with De Havilland Puss Moth and Monospar monoplanes, and in April 1937 extended its services to Brisbane with De Havilland Dragon eight-seat biplanes.

== Accidents and incidents ==
The airline was plagued by many accidents, three of them accompanied by fatalities:

- On 19 January 1937 a Puss Moth VH-UPQ crashed into the sea off Cairns, a young girl being drowned.
- ON 7 May 1937 a de Havilland Dragon VH-UZG crashed soon after takeoff at Cairns, the pilot suffering fatal injuries and three passengers also injured.
- On 29 August 1938 a de Havilland Dragon VH-UXK crashed at Innisfail, killing the pilot and four passengers.

Following this final disaster NQA went into liquidation, and on 25 October 1938 its assets were purchased in full by Airlines of Australia. Its airline services were maintained by the new owner and its successor Australian National Airways.

== See also ==
- List of defunct airlines of Australia
