= De Havilland Dragon =

1932 twin engine light transport aircraft

DH.84 Dragon
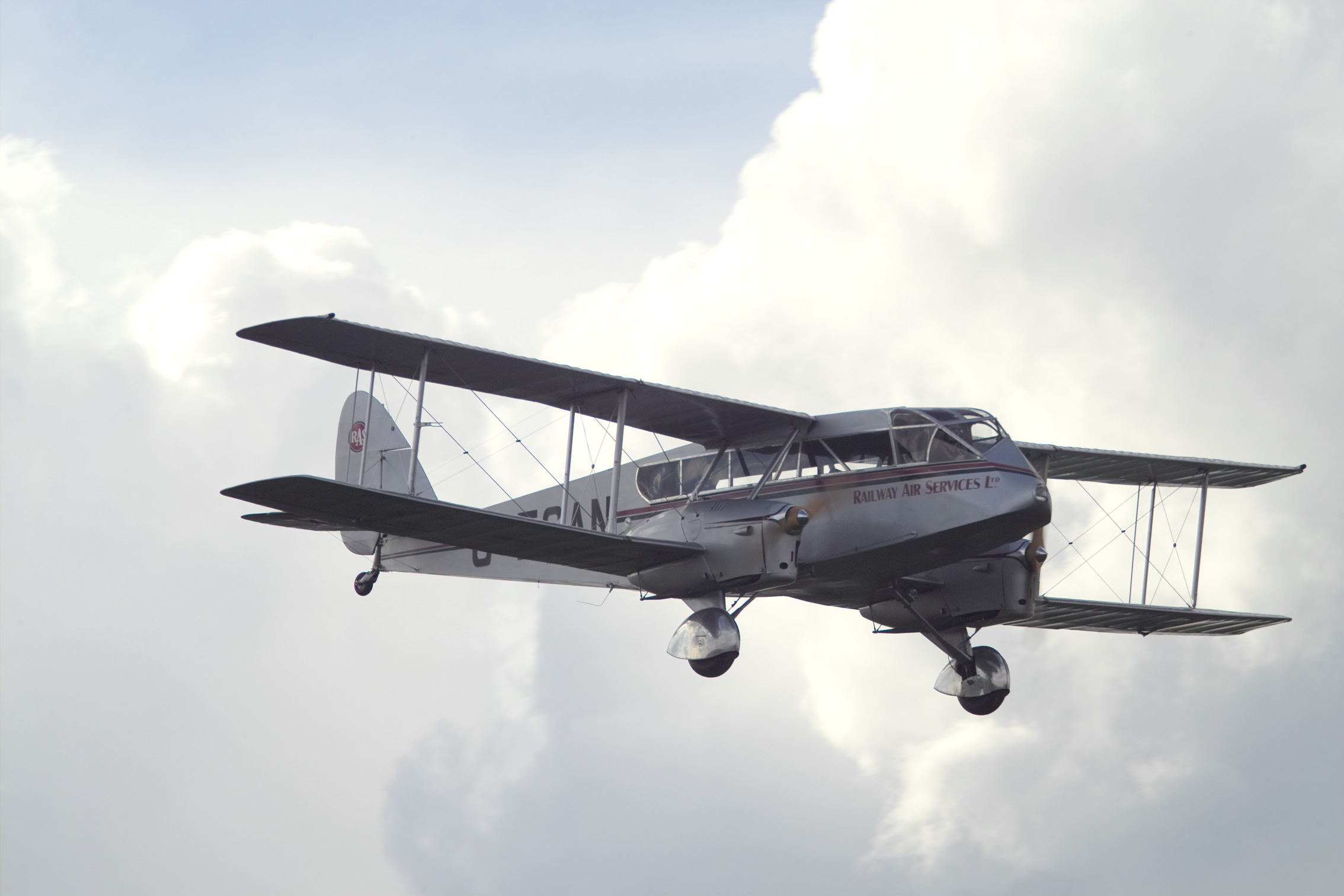
- de Havilland DH.84 Dragon G-ECAN at Sywell Air Show, September 2006

General information
- Type: Passenger and military transport / trainer
- Manufacturer: de Havilland
- Number built: 202

History
- Introduction date: April 1933
- First flight: 12 November 1932

The de Havilland DH.84 Dragon is a successful small commercial aircraft that was designed and built by the de Havilland company.

== Design and construction ==
Following the commercial success of its single-engined de Havilland Fox Moth that had first flown in March 1932, that aircraft's original commercial operator Hillman's Airways requested that a larger twin-engined version be built. The Dragon was a simple, light design with a plywood box fuselage using the same type of engine and similar outer wing sections of the earlier single-engined aircraft. It was originally designated the DH.84 "Dragon Moth" but marketed as the "Dragon". A prototype, which first flew at Stag Lane Aerodrome on 12 November 1932, and the next four aircraft were delivered to Hillman's which started a commercial service in April 1933. It could carry six passengers, each with 45 lb (20 kg) of luggage on the London-Paris route on a fuel consumption of just 13 gal (49 L) per hour. The wing panels outboard of the engines could be folded for storage.

== Operational service ==
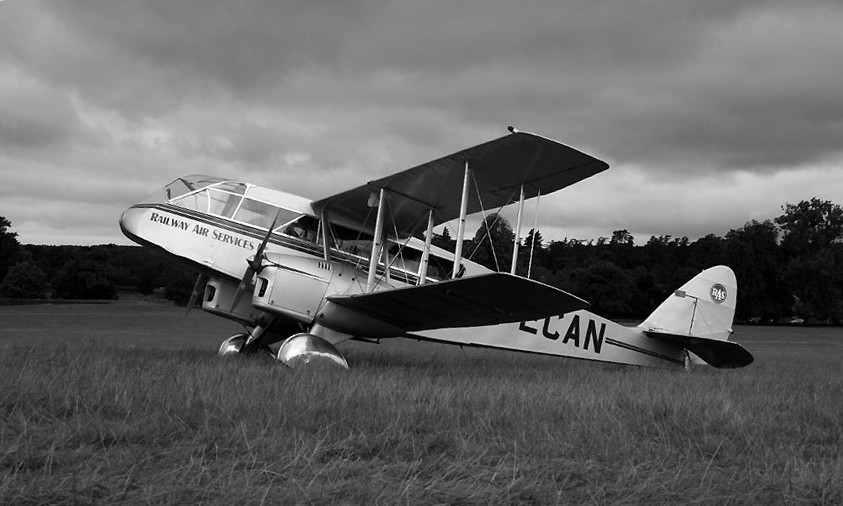
An Australian-built DH.84 Dragon at Woburn Tiger Moth Rally 2007

The Dragon proved very attractive as a short-haul low capacity airliner and was soon in service worldwide. From the 63rd aircraft late in 1933, the Dragon 2, with improvements including individually framed windows and faired undercarriage struts, was produced. Even though these changes were largely cosmetic the streamlining improved the aircraft's speed by about 5 mph (8 km/h), allowed 250 lb (113 kg) more payload to be carried and added 85 mi (137 km) of range.

British production of the DH.84 ended at the 115th aircraft, when it was replaced on the assembly line by the more powerful and elegant DH.89 de Havilland Dragon Rapide. However, after production was discontinued, the drawings and surviving tools and jigs were sent out from GB and quantity production was ordered for the RAAF (a total of eighty-seven) during the Second World War at Bankstown, Australia, as a navigational trainer for the Royal Australian Air Force, being preferred to the Rapide because its smaller engines were then being manufactured locally for de Havilland Tiger Moth production, making a total of 202 produced.

A new four-seat Dragon was delivered in 1933 to the Royal Flight for use by the Prince of Wales. It was sold in 1935. It was later pressed into service by the Royal Australian Air Force during the Second World War.

A special aircraft named Seafarer was built for Amy Johnson (a pioneering English aviator) and her husband Jim Mollison (a famous Scottish pioneer aviator) to make an attempt at the world long distance record. It had a strengthened landing gear and the cabin had extra fuel tanks. It was intended to fly from New York City to Baghdad, Iraq, but at their first attempt at a transatlantic flight from Croydon Airport in South London to the United States on 8 June 1933 the landing gear collapsed. After repairs Seafarer left Pendine Sands in South Wales and arrived at Bridgeport, Connecticut, in the United States 39 hours later. However, on landing the aircraft turned over and was damaged.

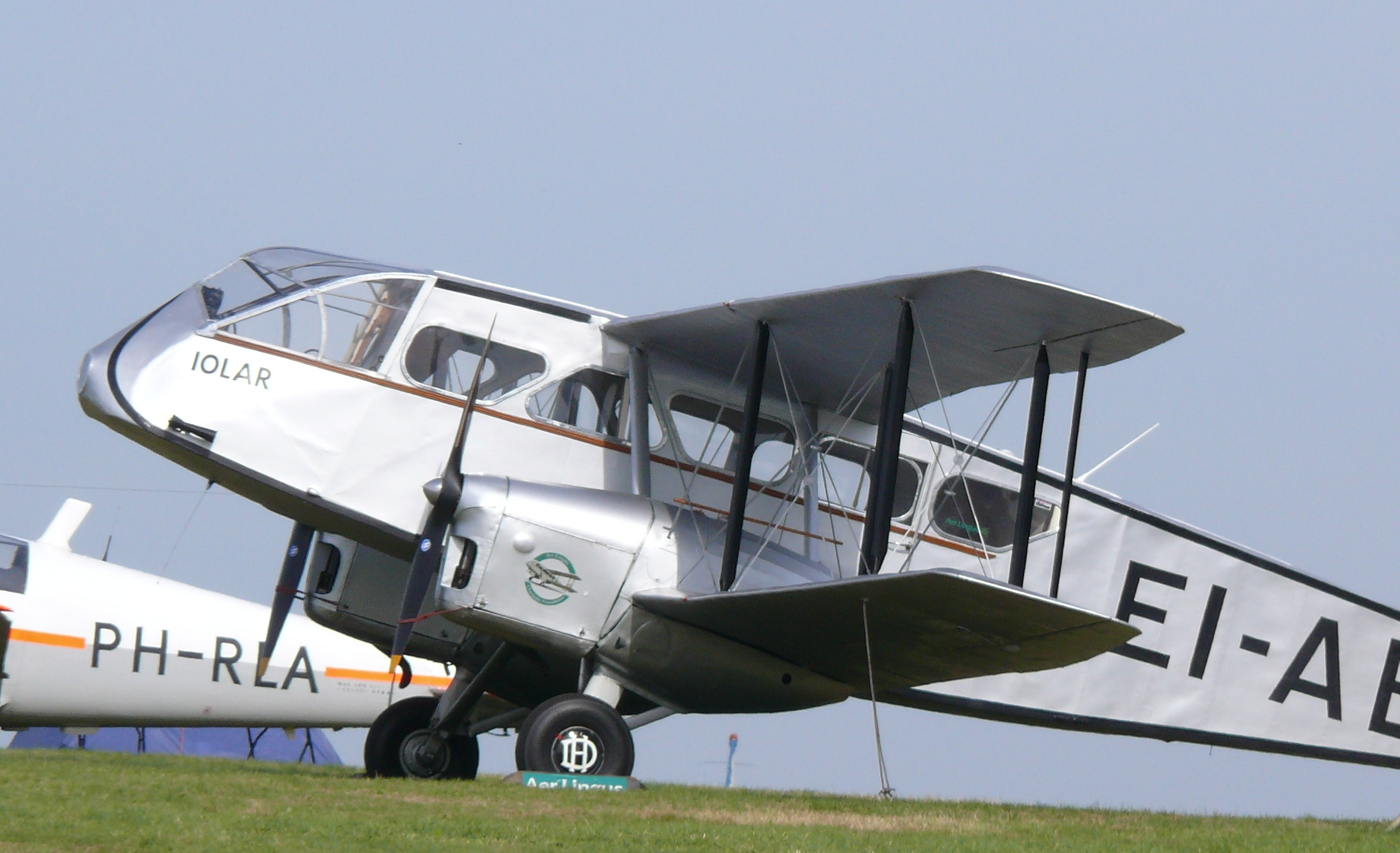
EI-ABI Iolar in 2012

The engines and fuel tanks were recovered from Seafarer and used in another Dragon named Seafarer II. After three attempts to take off from Wasaga Beach, Ontario, Canada, for Baghdad, Iraq, the attempt was abandoned and the aircraft was sold. On 8 August 1934, the new owners, James Ayling and Leonard Reid, took off in the Dragon, renamed Trail of the Caribou, from Wasaga Beach in another attempt at the distance record. Although the intended target was Baghdad, throttle problems forced the attempt to be abandoned, and Trail of the Caribou landed at Heston Aerodrome, an airfield west of London, in Middlesex, England, after 30 hours 55 minutes, making the first non-stop flight between the Canadian mainland and Britain.

The inaugural service of the Irish Airline Aer Lingus was provided by a DH.84 Dragon, registration EI-ABI and named Iolar, which means "Eagle" in the Irish language. For the 50th anniversary of the airline in 1986, a replacement Dragon was acquired, restored, reregistered as EI-ABI and repainted as the Iolar.

Following the War, surviving DH.84s passed into commercial service, with three still flying today.

== Accidents and incidents ==
- 26 September 1933 – ZS-AEF of the Aircraft Operating Company crashed at Baragwanath Airport, near Johannesburg, South Africa. The pilot was World War I flying ace, William Kennedy-Cochran-Patrick and the single passenger was Sir Michael Oppenheimer, 2nd Baronet; both were killed.
- 8 January 1935 – G-ACGK of Highland Airways Limited crashed into the Beauly Firth after takeoff from Longman Airport, Inverness, Scotland. The pilot and both passengers were killed.
- 21 February 1935 – two American sisters, Jane and Elizabeth Du Bois, jumped from G-ACEV of Hillman's Airways, en route from Stapleford Aerodrome, Essex, to Paris. They were the only passengers and the pilot was the only crew-member. The two women had bought all the seats on the aircraft, but claiming before take-off that their companions could not travel that day. Their bodies were found on waste ground in Upminster, but the pilot only became aware of what had happened some time later when over the English Channel. The women were the daughters of the American Consul in Naples, Court Du Bois; they had been well-known socialites and their deaths were widely reported. Press speculation linked their double suicide with the recent deaths of two R.A.F. pilots, with whom they had been romantically linked. The pilots had been both killed in the crash of a Short Singapore flying boat near Messina, Italy, six days earlier.
- On 1 July 1935, G-ADED of Railway Air Services crashed on take-off from Ronaldsway Airport, Isle of Man injuring all seven people on board. The aircraft, was operating a scheduled passenger flight from Ronaldsway to Ringway Airport, Manchester, Lancashire via Squires Gate Airport, Blackpool and Speke Airport, Liverpool; it was destroyed in the subsequent fire.
- On 22 July 1935, G-ACMP of Jersey Airways, operating a domestic flight from Bristol to Cardiff, with a pilot and two passengers on board, crashed while approaching Cardiff Airport. The aircraft spun and dived into the Bristol Channel about two miles off the Welsh coast, near Rumney, Cardiff killing all three on board.
- On 26 March 1936, G-ACAP of Commercial Air Hire crashed near Lyndhurst, Hampshire, England killing all five on board. The aircraft had flown from Croydon Airport and was carrying out military co-operation work around Southampton. Commercial Air Hire had a contract to fly at night to give searchlight crews practice at locating aircraft.
- On 7 May 1937, VH-UZG of North Queensland Airways crashed into trees near Cairns Airport, one passenger later dying from his injuries. The pilot and three other passengers were also seriously injured.
- On 29 August 1938, VH-UXK Cairns of North Queensland Airways, crashed at Innisfail, Queensland killing the pilot and four passengers.
- 21 September 1951 – Pilot First Officer Frederick George Barlogie of Bondi, New South Wales, was killed when his Qantas DH-84 Dragon crashed into mountainous country 11 kilometres (6.8 mi) southeast of Arona in the central highlands of New Guinea.
- On 13 December 1951 – The pilot and two passengers were killed when a Qantas Dragon crashed in mountainous country near Mount Hagen in the central highlands of New Guinea, Qantas's third fatal crash in four months, and most recent fatal accident to date.

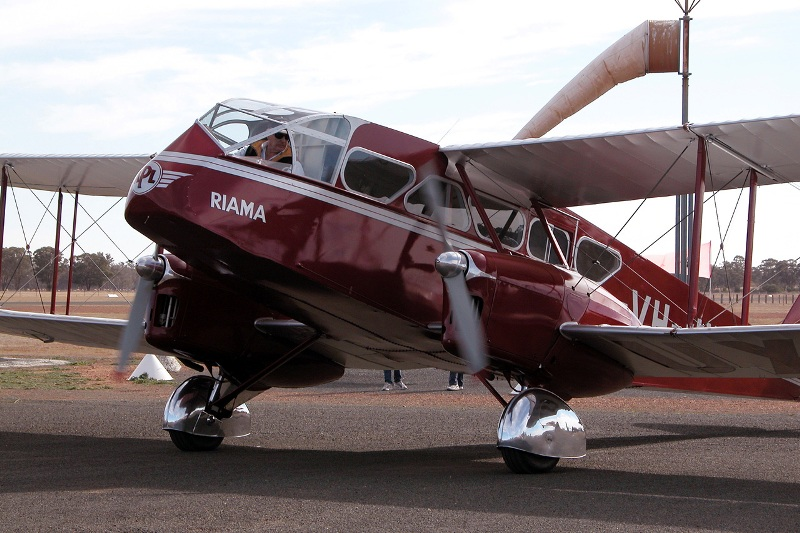
DH-84 VH-UXG (Riama), 2003

- 1 October 2012 – 2012 Riama crash. A privately owned 1934 de Havilland DH.84 Dragon 2 registration VH-UXG, named Riama (pictured) went missing in bad weather returning from an air show near Monto, Queensland, Australia to Caboolture. Queensland Police found the wreckage near Borumba Dam. All six occupants were killed and the aircraft destroyed after impacting a ridge. The pilot and owner had flown into unexpected thick cloud and issued a sécurité call. The aircraft's only primary instruments were an airspeed indicator and altimeter.

== Variants ==
- Dragon 1: Twin-engined medium transport biplane.
- Dragon 2: Improved version. Fitted with framed cabin windows and two faired main undercarriage legs.
- DH.84M Dragon: Military transport version. The DH.84M was armed with two machine guns, and it could carry up to sixteen 20 lb (9 kg) bombs. Exported to Denmark, Iraq and Portugal.

== Operators ==
♠ Original operators

=== Military operators ===
Australia

- Royal Australian Air Force♠

Austria

- Austrian Air Force (1927–1938)

Brazil

- Brazilian Naval Aviation

Denmark

- Royal Danish Air Force♠ – Two DH.84 Dragons

(Ethiopian Empire) Ethiopia

- Ethiopian Air Force

Iraq

- Royal Iraqi Air Force♠ – Eight DH.84M Dragons

Ireland

- Irish Air Corps

New Zealand

- Royal New Zealand Air Force
  - No. 42 Squadron RNZAF

Portugal

- Portuguese Air Force♠ – Three DH.84 Dragons

South Africa

- South African Air Force♠ – One aircraft operated during 1940.

Spanish Republic

- Spanish Republican Air Force

Turkey

- General Command of Mapping (Turkey)
- Turkish Air Force

United Kingdom

- Royal Air Force – Seventeen aircraft impressed.
  - Anti-Aircraft Co-operation Units.
  - No. 24 Squadron RAF.
  - King's Flight ♠

Kingdom of Yugoslavia

- Yugoslav Royal Air Force – One aircraft was impressed into military service in April 1940.

=== Civil operators ===
Australia

- Butler Air Transport
- MacRobertson Miller Airlines
- Muir Airlines of NT
- Qantas
- Western Australian Airways ♠

Brazil

- VASP♠

Canada

- Canadian Airways

Czechoslovakia

- Bata Corporation

A single de Havilland DH.84 Dragon, designed OK-ATO, was operated by the Bata shoe company as a short-haul executive transport

Egypt

- Misrair

France

- Lignes Aériennes Nord-Africaines (L.A.N.A.)

India

- Indian National Airways ♠

Ireland

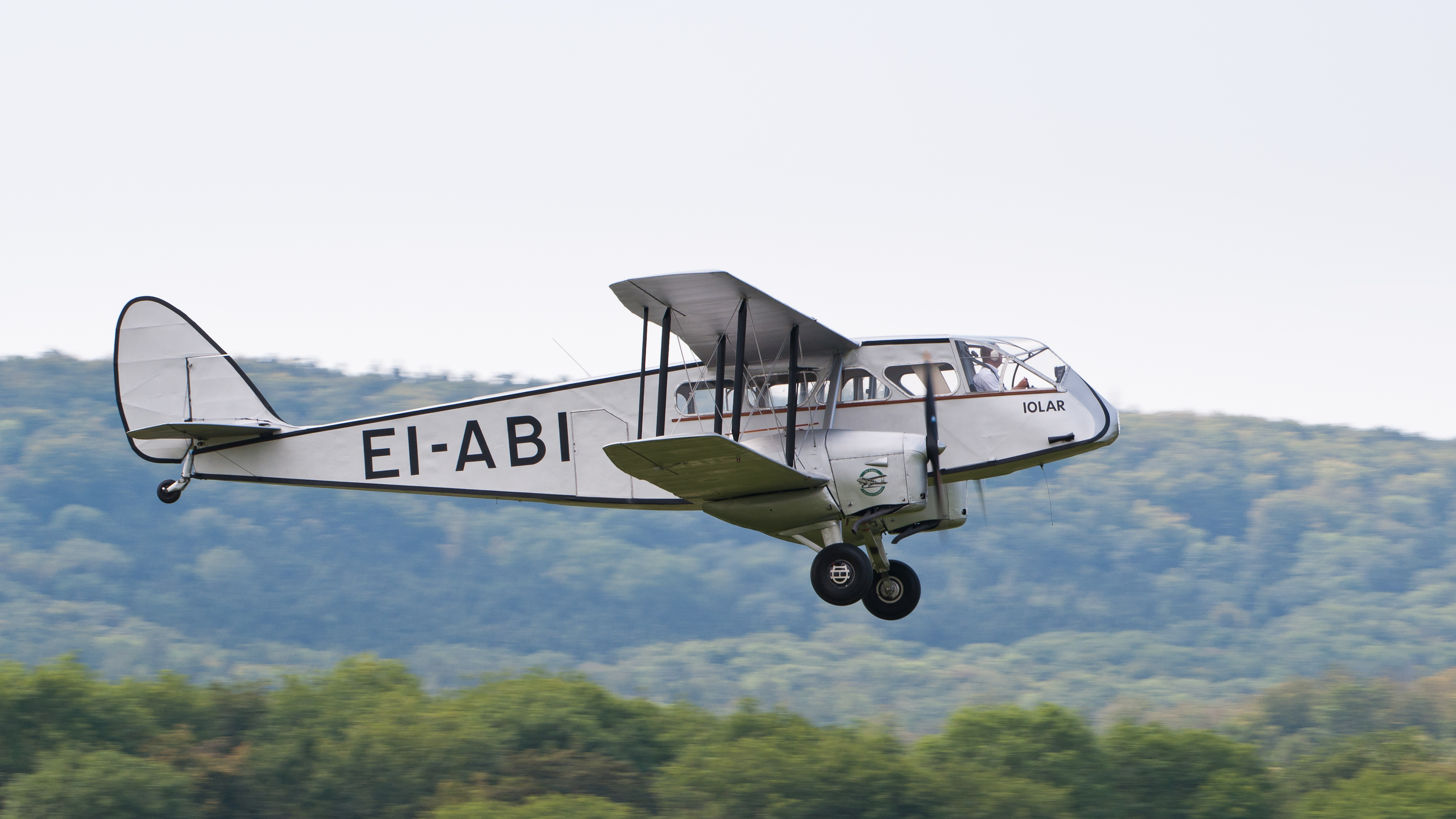
A DH.84 Dragon, repainted in the livery of Aer Lingus' original aircraft "Iolar".

- Aer Lingus

Kenya

- Wilson Airways ♠

New Zealand

- Air Travel (NZ) Ltd
- East Coast Airways ♠
- Union Airways of New Zealand

Portuguese Timor

- Transportes Aéreos de Timor

South Africa

- African Air Transport ♠

United Kingdom

- Aberdeen Airways ♠
- Air Cruises ♠

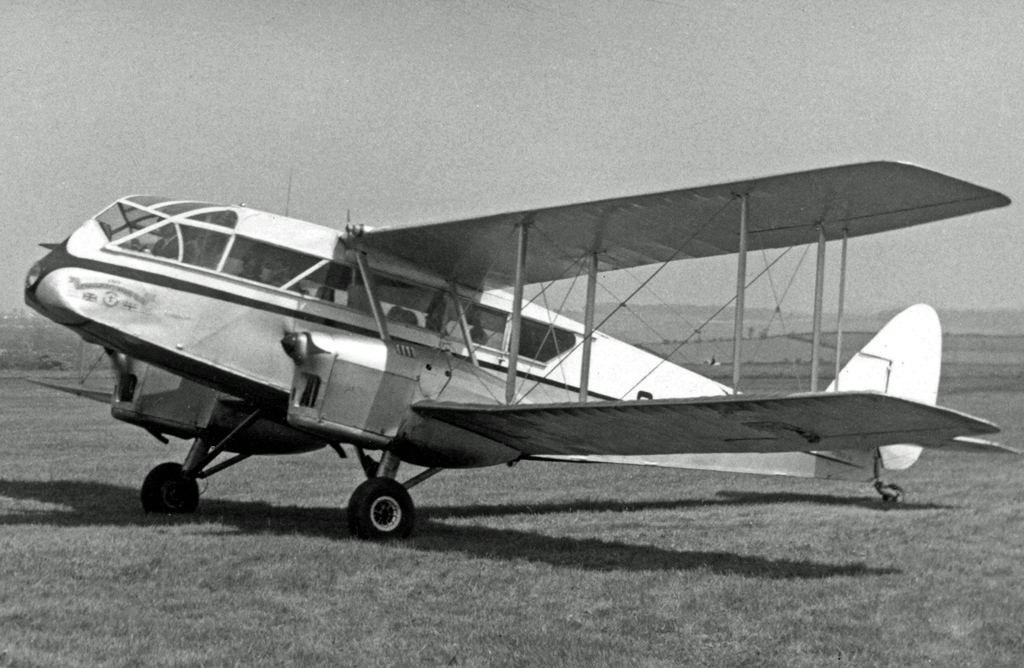
DH.84 Dragon 1 of Air Navigation & Trading (UK) in 1956

- Air Navigation & Trading
- Air Dispatch
- Allied Airways
- Blackpool and West Coast Air Services ♠
- British Airways
- British Continental Airways
- Commercial Air Hire ♠
- Great Western & Southern Air Lines
- Highland Airways Limited ♠
- Hillman's Airways♠
- Jersey Airways ♠
- Midland & Scottish Air Ferries ♠
- Northern and Scottish Airways
- Olley Air Service ♠
- Provincial Airways
- Railway Air Services ♠
- Scottish Airways
- Scottish Motor Traction ♠
- Spartan Airlines
- Western Airways ♠

Latvia

- Valsts Gaisa Satiksme – One aircraft was used as a civilian transport.

== Specifications (DH.84 Dragon 1) ==
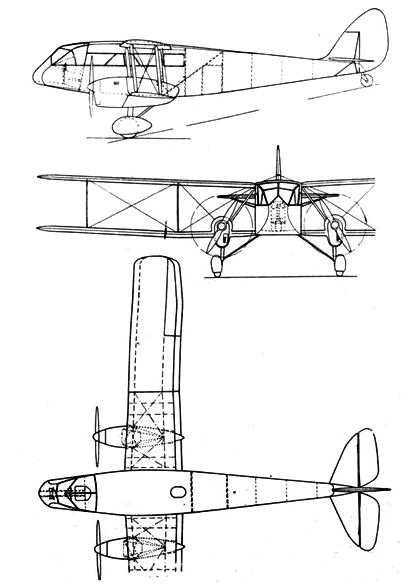
De Havilland DH 84 3-view drawing from L'Aerophile February 1933

Data from de Havilland Aircraft since 1909

General characteristics

- Crew: 1
- Capacity: 6–10 passengers
- Length: 34 ft 6 in (10.52 m)
- Wingspan: 47 ft 4 in (14.43 m)
- Height: 10 ft 1 in (3.07 m)
- Wing area: 376 sq ft (34.9 m^{2})
- Airfoil: RAF 15
- Empty weight: 2,300 lb (1,043 kg)
- Gross weight: 4,200 lb (1,905 kg)
- Powerplant: 2 × de Havilland Gipsy Major I 4-cylinder air-cooled inverted in-line piston engine, 130 hp (97 kW) each
- Propellers: 2-bladed fixed-pitch propellers

Performance

- Maximum speed: 128 mph (206 km/h, 111 kn)
- Cruise speed: 109 mph (175 km/h, 95 kn)
- Range: 460 mi (740 km, 400 nmi)
- Service ceiling: 12,500 ft (3,800 m)
- Rate of climb: 612 ft/min (3.11 m/s)

== See also ==
Related development

- de Havilland Dragon Rapide
- de Havilland Express

Related lists

- List of aircraft of the Spanish Republican Air Force
- List of aircraft of World War II

== Bibliography ==
- Arthur, Robin (1992). "Pre-War Airliner Fleets: I. Hillman's Airways Ltd". Archive. No. 1. Air-Britain. pp. 23–24. ISSN 0262-4923.
- "Complete Civil Registers: 5: CR-T: Portuguese Timor". Archive. No. 2. Air-Britain. 1982. p. 32. ISSN 0262-4923.
- Dodds, Colin N. (2005). The Story of the de Havilland Dragon Types. Tonbridge, UK: Air-Britain (Historians) Ltd. ISBN 0-85130-363-3.
- Hooks, Mike (October 2011). "Civvies at War". Aeroplane. Cudham: Kelsey Publishing Group.
- Jackson, A.J. (1987). De Havilland Aircraft since 1909 (Third ed.). London: Putnam. ISBN 0-85177-802-X.
- Jackson, A.J. (1988). British Civil Aircraft 1919–1972: Volume II (1988 ed.). London: Putnam (Conway Maritime Press). ISBN 0-85177-813-5.
- Jackson, A.J. (1973). British Civil Aircraft since 1919 Volume 2. London: Putnam. p. 382. ISBN 0-370-10010-7.
- Justo, Craig P. (January–February 2004). "Timeless Transport: Australia's Resurrected DH.84 Dragon". Air Enthusiast. No. 109. pp. 2–11. ISSN 0143-5450.
- Lucchini, Carlo (April 1999). "Le meeting saharien de 1938" [The 1938 Sahara Air Meeting]. Avions: Toute l'aéronautique et son histoire (in French). No. 73. pp. 53–57. ISSN 1243-8650.
- Lewis, Peter (1971). British Racing and Record-Breaking Aircraft. London: Putnam. ISBN 0-370-00067-6.
- Poole, Stephen (1999). Rough Landing or Fatal Flight. Douglas: Amulree Publications. ISBN 1-901508-03-X.
- Riding, Richard (June 1980). "The Black Dragons". Aeroplane Monthly. Vol. 8, no. 6. pp. 284–290. ISSN 0143-7240.
