= Borumba Dam =

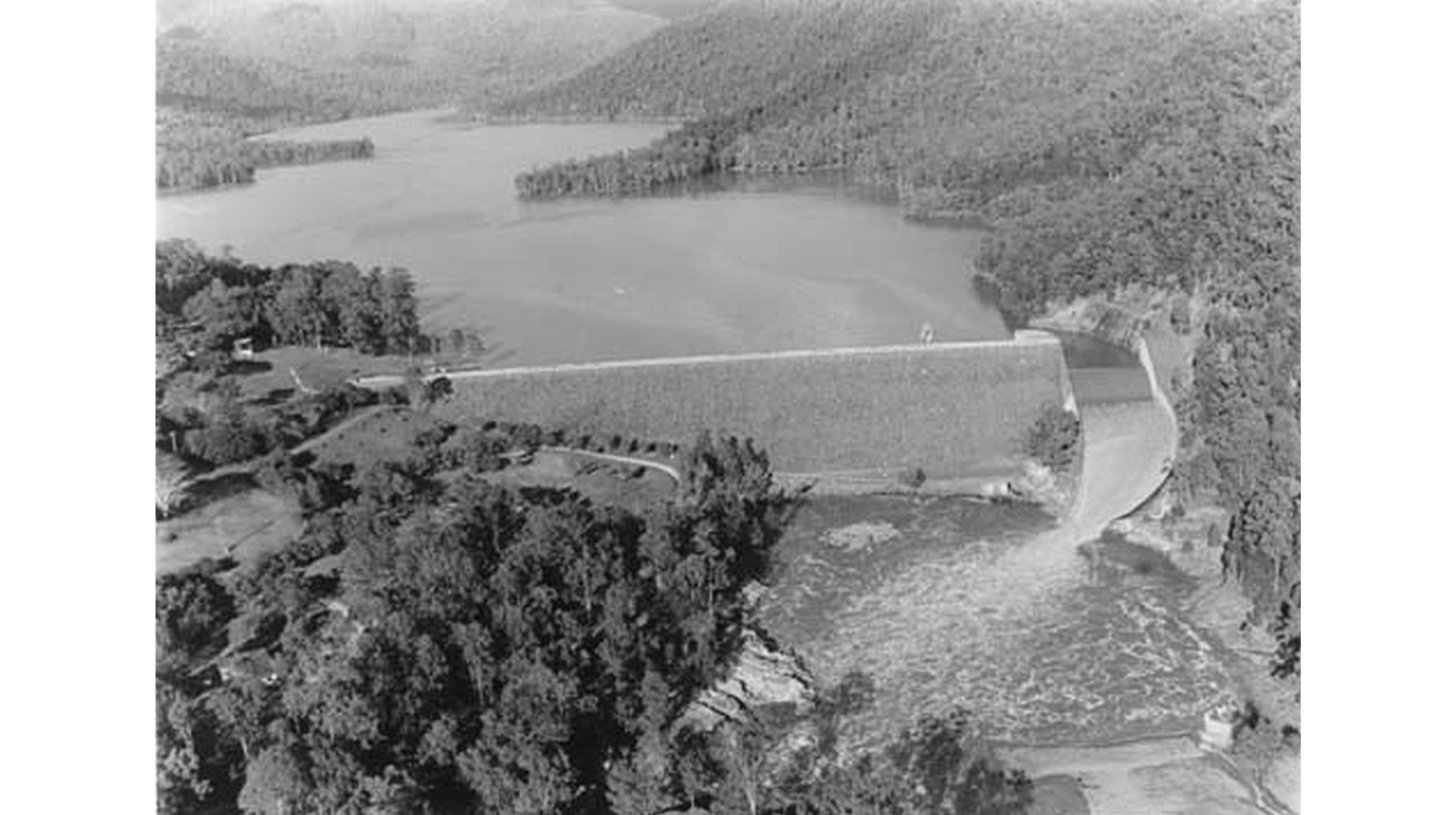
- The dam, c. 1970

- Location of the dam in Queensland
- Interactive map of Borumba Dam
- Country: Australia
- Location: Wide Bay–Burnett, Queensland
- Coordinates: 26°30′25″S 152°34′55″E
- Purpose: Irrigation; Potable water supply
- Status: Operational
- Opening date: 1963; upgraded: 1997 and 2009
- Operator: SEQ Water

Dam and spillways
- Type of dam: Rock-fill dam
- Impounds: Yabba Creek
- Height: 43 m (141 ft)
- Length: 343 m (1,125 ft)
- Dam volume: 402×10^{3} m^{3} (14.2×10^{6} cu ft)
- Spillway type: Uncontrolled
- Spillway capacity: 3,140 m^{3}/s (111,000 cu ft/s)

Reservoir
- Creates: Lake Borumba
- Total capacity: 45,952 ML (37,254 acre⋅ft)
- Catchment area: 465 km^{2} (180 sq mi)
- Surface area: 480 ha (1,200 acres)
- Website www.seqwater.com.au

The Borumba Dam is a rock-fill embankment dam with an un-gated spillway located across the Yabba Creek, a tributary of the Mary River, in the Wide Bay–Burnett region of Queensland, Australia. The main purposes of the dam are for irrigation and potable water supply. The resultant impounded reservoir is called Lake Borumba.

== Location and features ==
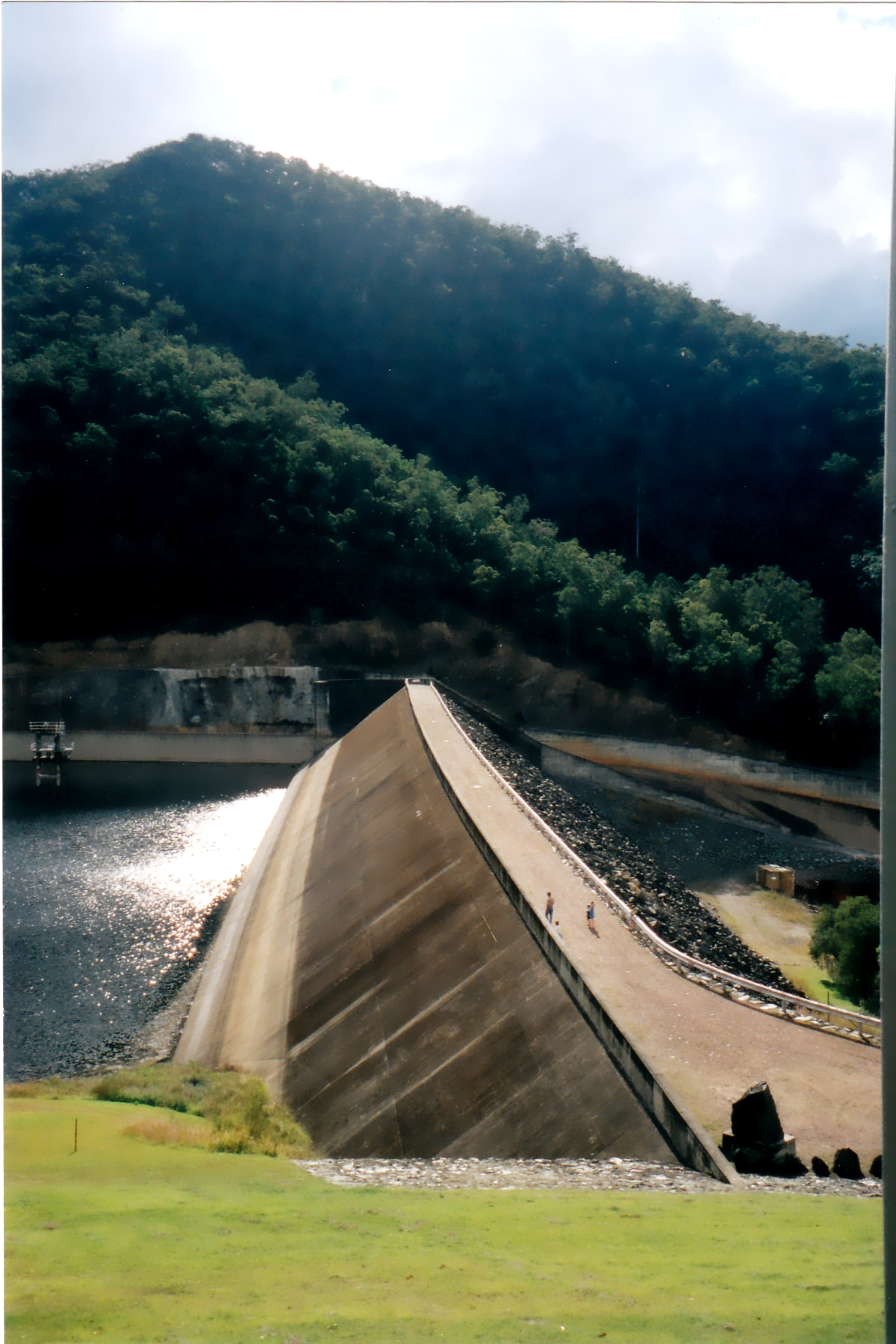
The dam wall

Constructed in 1964, Borumba Dam is a popular destination for recreational fishers. The dam wall is located about 11 kilometres (6.8 mi) south west of Imbil.

The dam wall is 43 metres (141 ft) high and 343 metres (1,125 ft) long and holds back 45,952 megalitres (37,254 acre⋅ft) of water when at full capacity. The surface area of the reservoir is 480 hectares (1,200 acres) and the catchment area is 465 square kilometres (180 sq mi). The uncontrolled un-gated spillway has a discharge capacity of 3,140 cubic metres per second (111,000 cu ft/s). The dam is managed by Seqwater.

In 1980 Ern Grant, author of Ern Gran's Guide to Fishes, was instrumental in setting up a Freshwater Fish Hatchery at Borumba. The hatchery is no longer in operation. According to a local councillor the spillway developed a crack after an earthquake on 1 December 1991. The dam wall was raised by 2.5 metres (8 ft 2 in) and completed in 1997. During 2008 and 2009 the dam wall was raised by another 1.6 metres (5 ft 3 in). The second upgrade was intended to allow better management of extreme rainfall events.

=== Proposed pumped hydro-electric project ===
In August 2021 the Queensland Government announced $22m in funding for analysis of a proposed pumped hydro-electric project, utilising a new dam built above Borumba Dam. It could store 2 gigawatts (2,700,000 hp) of power running 24 hours, and may cost $14 billion.

In 2025, the project was considered to be significantly over budget and delayed. The project's costs surged from $14.2 billion to $18.4 billion, with a revised completion date estimated at no earlier than 2033, potentially extending to July 2035. This planned 2,000-megawatt (2,700,000 hp) facility aimed to power two million homes as a key component of the Palaszczuk government's renewable energy initiative. The revised costs and timelines were attributed to steep increases in construction expenses and protracted approval processes. David Janetzki, State Treasurer in 2025, criticised the Palaszczuk administration for the financial and scheduling overshoots and is exploring smaller, more manageable project alternatives. Concerns about the project's environmental impact on the Mary River and surrounding ecosystems were also raised, with calls for greater transparency and public access to project reports.

== Recreation ==
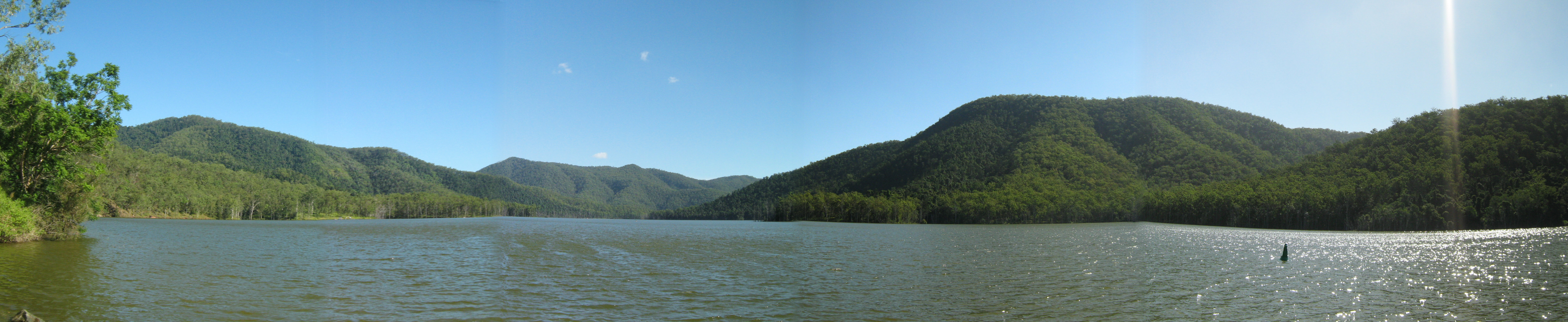
Lake Borumba

A range of recreation activities are permitted at Borumba Dam including boating (powered and non-powered), canoeing and kayaking, water skiing and jet skiing, fishing, camping, and walking. Picnic and barbeque facilities are available.

Naturally occurring blue-green algae blooms sometimes mean Seqwater closes access to the dam's water for public safety purposes.

== See also ==
- List of dams in Queensland
