= Sunbeam Motor Car Company =

British automobile manufacturer, 1905–1934

Sunbeam Motor Car Company Limited
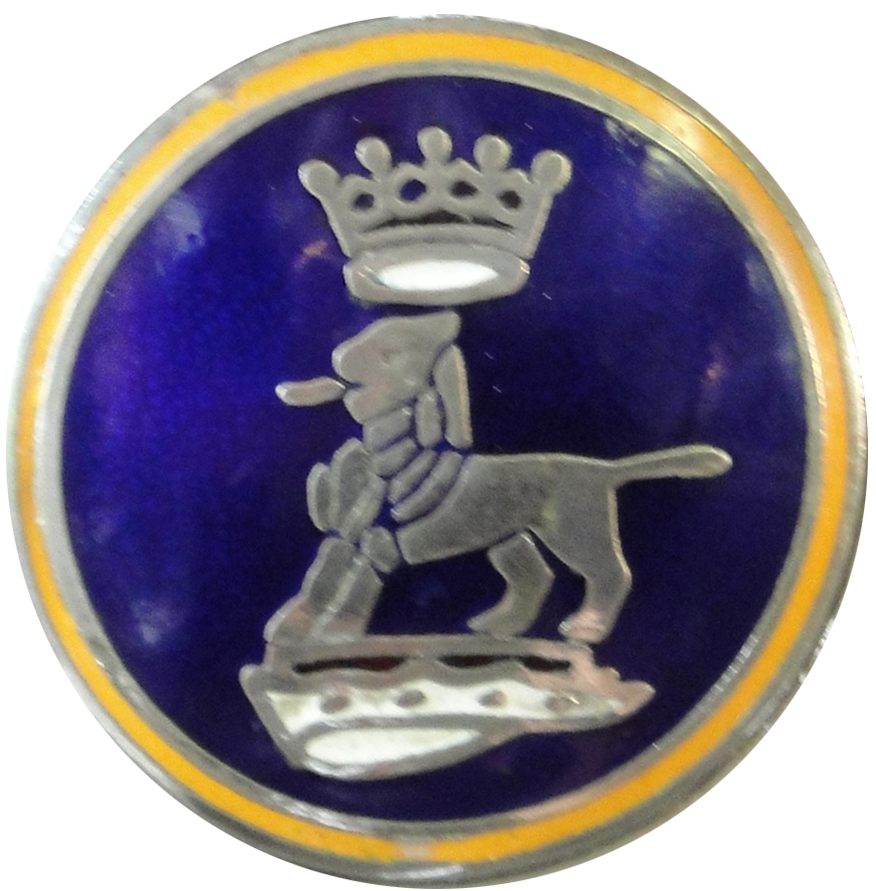

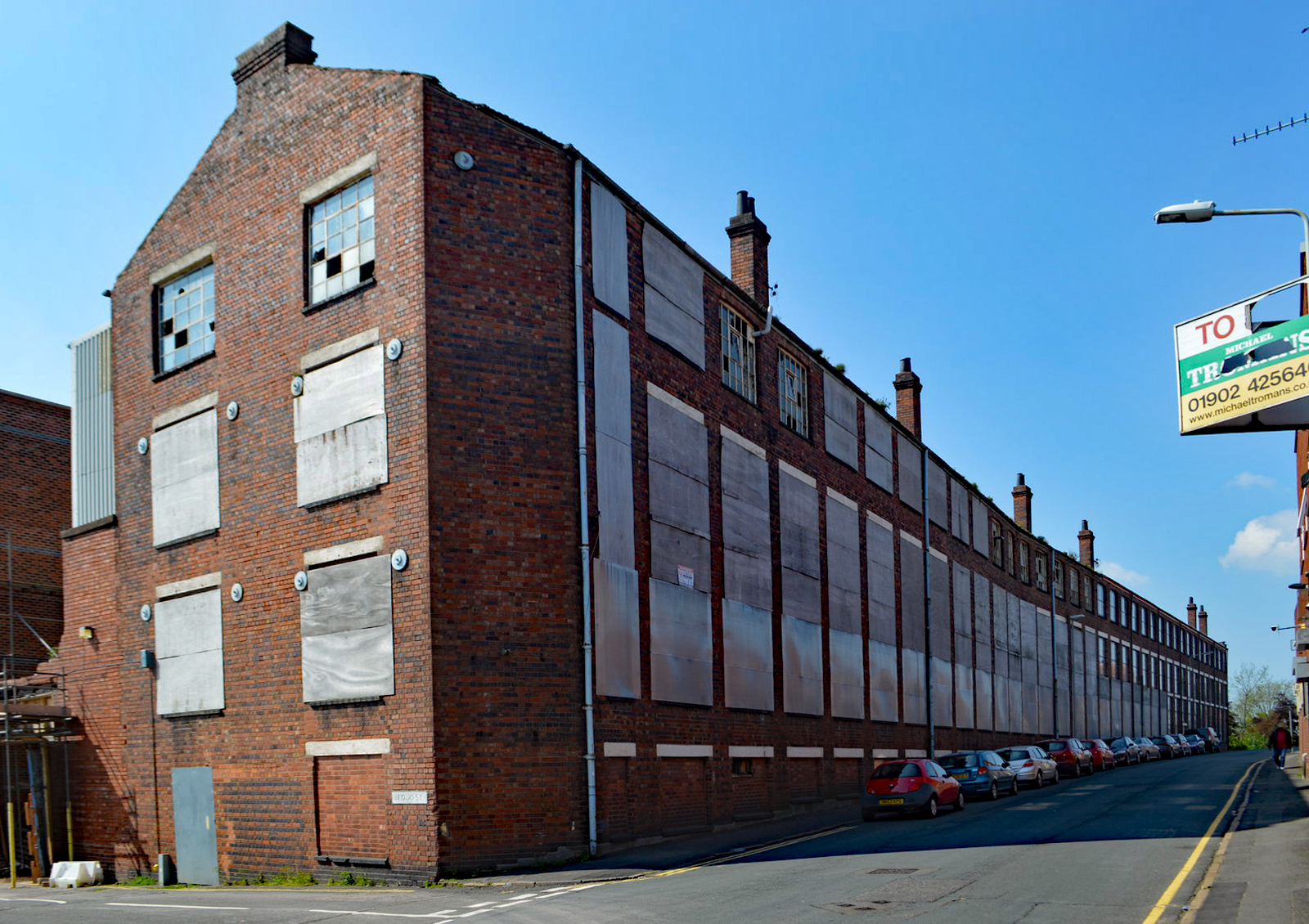
- Sunbeam Works in Wolverhampton, pictured in 2016
- Type: Public Listed Company
- Industry: Automotive
- Founded: 1905 in Wolverhampton, Staffordshire, England
- Founder: John Marston
- Defunct: 1934; 92 years ago
- Fate: Company acquired by Rootes Group in 1934; continued as a brand until 1981
- Successor: Sunbeam-Talbot
- Headquarters: Wolverhampton, England
- Key people: John Marston, Louis Coatalen
- Products: Automobiles
- Parent: John Marston Ltd. (1905–20); S.T.D. Motors (1920–34)

Sunbeam Motor Car Company Limited was a British automobile manufacturer in operation between 1905 and 1934. Its works were at Moorfields in Blakenhall, a suburb of Wolverhampton in Staffordshire, now West Midlands. John Marston first registered the Sunbeam name in 1888 for his pedal-cycle business. Sunbeam motor car manufacture began in 1901. The motor business was sold to a newly incorporated Sunbeam Motor Car Company Limited in 1905, to separate it from Marston's pedal-cycle business. Sunbeam motorcycles were not made until 1912.

In-house designer Louis Coatalen had an enthusiasm for motor racing and accumulated expertise with engines. Sunbeam manufactured their own aero engines during the First World War and 647 aircraft to the designs of other manufacturers. Engines drew Sunbeam into Grand Prix racing and participation in the achievement of world land speed records.

Despite its well-regarded cars and aero engines, by 1934, a long period of particularly slow sales had led to continuing losses. In 1924, Sunbeam was unable to repay the money borrowed over ten years to fund its Grand Prix racing programme, and a receiver was appointed. There was a forced sale, and Sunbeam was picked up by the Rootes brothers. Manufacture of Sunbeam's then old-fashioned cars did not resume under the new owners, but Sunbeam trolleybuses remained in production.

The two Rootes brothers had intended to sell luxury cars under the Sunbeam name, but by 1938 instead chose to add the name to their Talbot branded range of Rootes designs, calling them Sunbeam-Talbots. In 1954 they dropped Talbot from the name.

Sunbeam continued to appear as a marque name on new cars until 1976. It was then used as a model name, firstly for the Chrysler Sunbeam from 1977 to 1979, and, following the takeover of Chrysler Europe by PSA Group, for the Talbot Sunbeam from 1979 through to its discontinuation in 1981.

== Ownership ==
=== John Marston ===
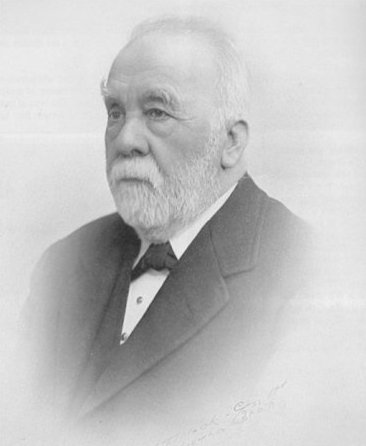
John Marston, founder, pictured in 1916

John Marston, the London-educated son of a sometime mayor of Ludlow and landowner, had been apprenticed to Edward Perry, tinplate-works master and twice mayor of Wolverhampton. In 1859 aged 23 Marston bought two other tinplate manufacturers in Bilston, four miles away, and set himself up on his own account. On Perry's death Marston bought his Jeddo Works in Paul Street Wolverhampton, left Bilston and continued Perry's business.

An avid cyclist he established his Sunbeamland Cycle Factory in 1897 in his Paul Street premises manufacturing and assembling pedal bicycles he branded Sunbeam. His Sunbeam trademark was registered in 1893. In 1895 a company, John Marston Limited, was incorporated and took ownership of John Marston's business. The Sunbeam trademark was registered for motor-cars in 1900.

Rugby-educated Thomas Cureton (1863–1921) began as his apprentice then became Marston's right-hand man in the cycle works and the cautious advocate of a motor-car venture. Their board of directors did not favour it but Marston and Cureton continued their project. Between 1899 and 1901 Sunbeam produced a number of experimental cars driven about Wolverhampton but none was offered for sale. In late 1900 they announced the purchase in Blakenhall of "a large area of land in Upper Villiers Street for the erection of works for the manufacture of cars" alongside the premises of Marston's Villiers Engineering business. The first announcement of their new autocar was on 22 September 1900 issue of The Autocar but no full description was provided to the public until February 1901. It was supplied with a 2-seater body on a channel steel frame powered by a 4-horsepower horizontal engine with electric ignition intended to run at 700 rpm and have two forward speeds and reverse using belt drive to differential gears on the live axle. Dimensions: weight 10 cwt, overall measurements 84 inches by 57 inches.

==== Cyclecar ====
The first production car branded Sunbeam was not Marston and Cureton's but a car designed and developed by a young architect, Maxwell Mabberly-Smith, powered by a single-cylinder 2 3/4 horsepower De Dion engine. Described as a "sociable" it carried two passengers sitting close together facing the roadside from above a central belt-drive. To begin with they faced opposite roadsides. This layout provided propinquity while maintaining propriety. Their driver at his tiller sat behind them his body facing the opposite roadside. Wheels were arranged in a diamond formation. They used a frame like a motorised quadracycle version of Starley's Coventry Rotary and were to be referred to by The Automotor Journal as "the curiously light vehicles with which their (Sunbeam) name has for some time been associated". The Sunbeam Mabley was a limited success, several hundred sold in 1901 and 1902 at £130. More stock was still in the Sunbeam catalogue in early 1904 with the following specification: single cylinder 74 x 76 mm. 327 cc engine designed to run at 1,800 rpm, 2-speed gearbox, central wheels driven by belt then chain drives from the differential. Weight 4 1/2 cwt. Price £120

==== Motorcar ====
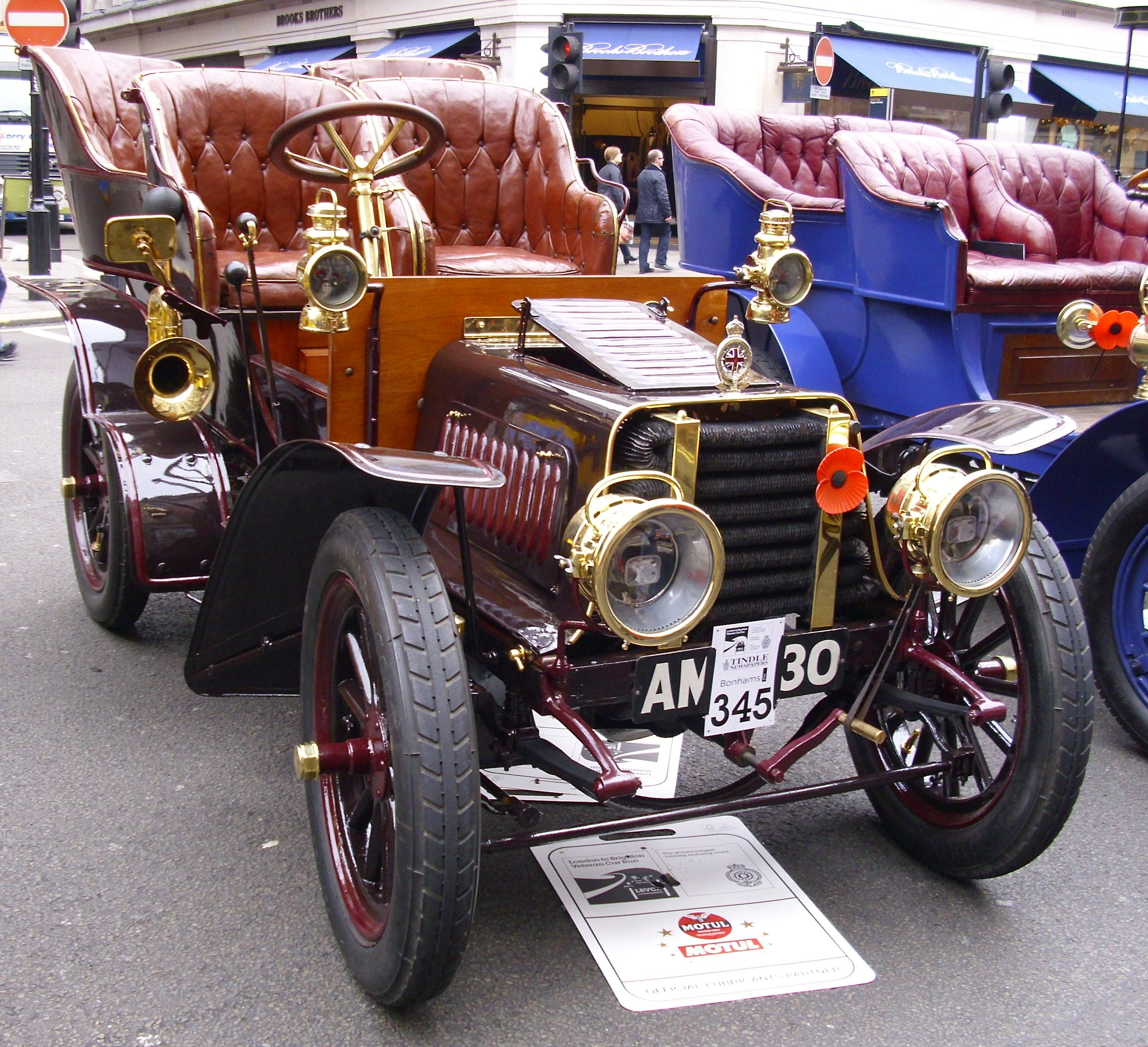
1903 12 horsepower Sunbeam by Berliet

At the annual Stanley Cycle Show in November 1902 Sunbeam, thoroughly approved by the magazine's correspondent, displayed beside more Mableys a 12-horsepower four-cylinder car with the engine beneath a bonnet at the front, camshaft within the "crank chamber", a four-speed gearbox and all four artillery wheels of the same size fitted with pneumatic tyres. Price 500 guineas or £525. Listed in February 1904 its specification was: four cylinders 80 × 120 mm. 1527 cc engine designed to run at 1,000 rpm, four-speed gearbox, rear wheels driven by chain drives from the differential. Weight 16 cwt. Price £512.

In February 1904 the 12-horsepower car was given a six-cylinder 16-horsepower stablemate. Like the 12 the new engine was designed to give its full power at what were even then considered low engine speeds. Particular note was made that special attention had once more been paid to further controlling the airflow beneath the car's apron and the chassis to reduce that bane of passengers' comfort, the car's disturbance of dust on the road. The new car also featured chain cases so the chains ran in oil, were rendered almost silent and were protected from dirt.

==== Thomas Pullinger ====
London-born Thomas Charles Willis Pullinger (1866–1945) joined Sunbeam in 1902. He had repaired, then made bicycles, and then in 1891 was sent by Humber to France for Humber's joint venture with Gladiator but Humber struck difficulties and Pullinger stayed in France with Alexandre Darracq as Darracq's designer and personal assistant. He moved on as works manager to other French firms, designing perhaps the first small car and certainly designing the first water-cooled cylinder head. Very keen to design and build his own car, he moved back to England and arrived at Sunbeam in Wolverhampton on a motor-quadracycle he had built himself. He prepared a report for the Sunbeam directors and delivered it on 11 November 1902. His first recommendation was that Sunbeam should buy-in a car from an established firm, then as sales built up, buy them without certain components, which would instead be made by Sunbeam, until all that was bought-in would be an engine. The report concluded with his advice that the cars should be supplied to Sunbeam by Berliet. He also advised the remaining stock of Mabley cars should be sold off as quickly as possible. A decision was made to sell shares in the company to the general public. Some of the board approved because they could see much growth ahead, some only because they wanted other people to come in to cut back on their own risk. On 31 January 1905 the architect signed the plans for the new motorcar buildings on the land in Upper Villiers Street.

=== Sunbeam Motor Car Company ===
In January 1905, the Sunbeam Motor Car Company Ltd was formed to purchase and remove motor cars and their Villiers Street Works from the rest of the John Marston business which retained Sunbeam Cycles. Six years later after several further issues of shares to provide capital for greater expansion there was a (technically) public offer of ordinary and preference shares to Sunbeam agents and their customers representing a small part of the company's capital. Twelve months later in January 1912 its shares were formally listed on the London Stock Exchange and Sunbeam became a public listed company.

==== Louis Coatalen ====
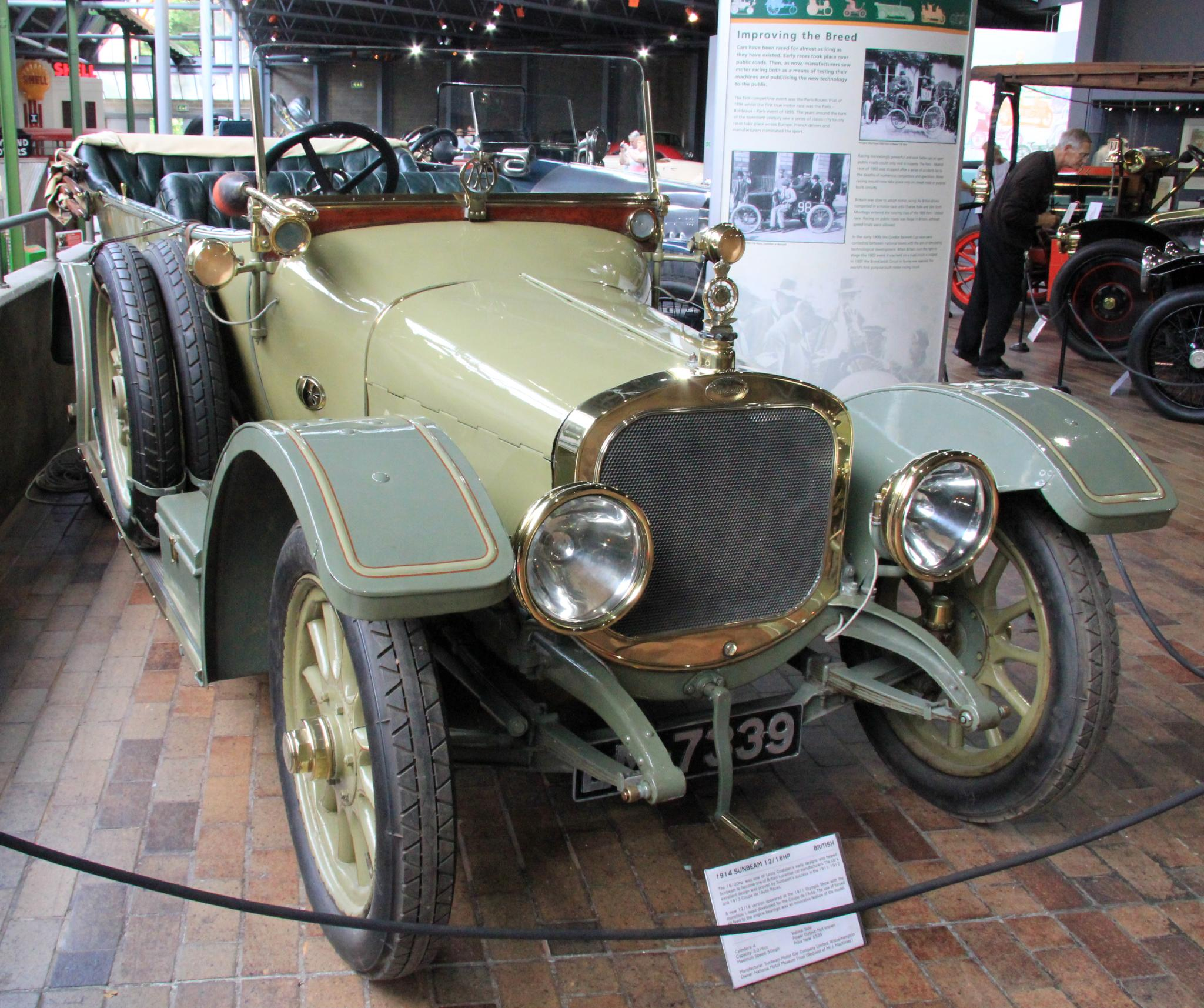
1914 12–16 4-cylinders 3 Litres

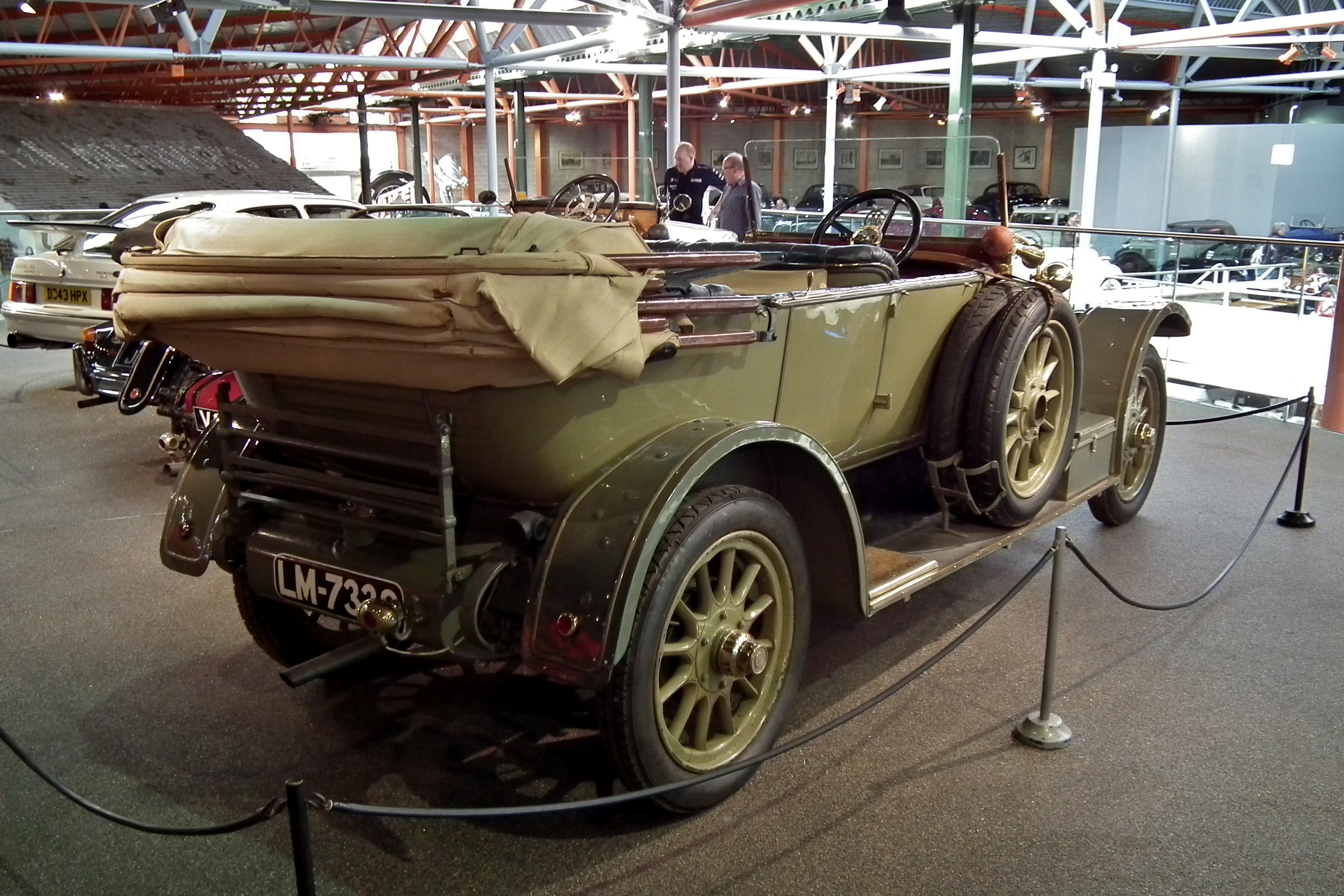
1914 12–16

The Breton car designer, Louis Coatalen, joined Sunbeam from Hillman-Coatalen in 1909, and became chief designer. He soon reorganised production so almost all parts were built in-house instead of relying on outside suppliers with their variable quality. He quickly introduced his first design, the Sunbeam 14/20, their first to use a shaft-driven rear axle. It was upgraded in 1911 with a slightly larger engine and rebranded 16/20.

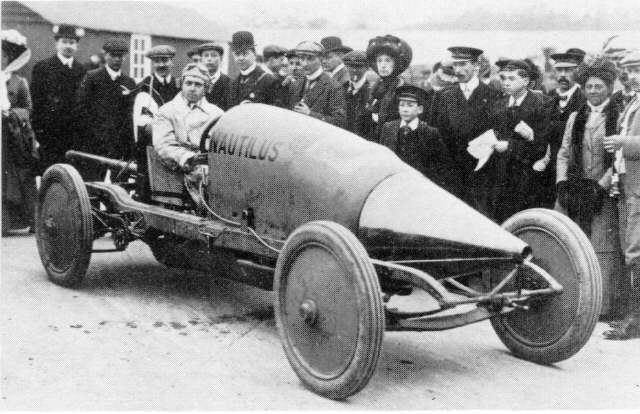
Louis Coatalen in the Nautilus at Brooklands in 1910

Coatalen was particularly fond of racing as a way to drive excellence noting that "Racing improves the breed". After designing his 14/20 he began to design advanced high-power engines combining overhead valves with a pressurised oil lubrication system. In 1910 he built Sunbeam Nautilus, his first dedicated land-speed-record car, powered by a 4.2-litre version of this engine design. The Nautilus implemented a number of early "wind cutting" or streamlining features but the specially-built engine suffered various problems and eventually the engine design was abandoned. The next year he made Sunbeam Toodles II featuring an improved valve system that made the Nautilus engine a success. Coatalen won 22 prizes in Toodles II at Brooklands in 1911 and also achieved a flying mile of 86.16 mph (138.66 km/h) to take the 16 hp Short Record. Sunbeam cars powered by more conventional (for the time) side-valve engines featured prominently in the 1911 Coupe de l'Auto race, and improved versions won first, second and third the next year. Sunbeams continued to race over the next few years, but its management had moved on to other interests.

Coatalen also designed a number of passenger cars, notably the Sunbeam 12–16. By 1911 Sunbeam were building 853 cars a year and were regarded as a substantial motor manufacturer. Wolseley sold 3,000 cars of similar quality in 1913. Ford sold 6,000 Model Ts that same year assembled at Trafford Park, Manchester. In 1914 Ford switched on Britain's first moving assembly line for car production and it began its run at a rate of 21 cars an hour.

| Year | Production figures | Model |
|---|---|---|
| 1909 | 100 | 12 HP; 16/20; 25/30; 35 HP; 16 HP; 14/18 HP |
| 1910 | 515 | 12 HP; 16/20; 25/30; 12/16; 16/20 |
| 1911 | 853 | 12/16; 16/20; 25/30; 18/22; 25/30 |
| 1912 | 2350 | 18/22; 25/30; 12/16; 16/20; 25/30 |
| 1913 | 1700 | 12/16; 16/20; 25/30 |

==== First World War ====
===== Aero engines =====
In 1912 they began to make aircraft engines introducing a series of engines that were not a commercial success. Coatalen seemed to believe the proper solution was a bespoke design for an aircraft designer's requirements instead of designing and producing a successful engine to let the aircraft designers build their aircraft around it. Sunbeam's designs included the troublesome V8 Sunbeam Arab, which was ordered in quantity in 1917 but suffered from continual vibration and reliability problems and only saw limited service and the more successful V12 Sunbeam Cossack. Meanwhile, Coatalen continued to experiment with ever-more odd designs such as the star-layout Sunbeam Malay, which never got beyond a prototype, the air-cooled Sunbeam Spartan and the diesel-powered Sunbeam Pathan. However Sunbeam was successful with the introduction of newer manufacturing techniques and became one of the first to build aluminium single-block engines, a design that did not become common until the 1930s.

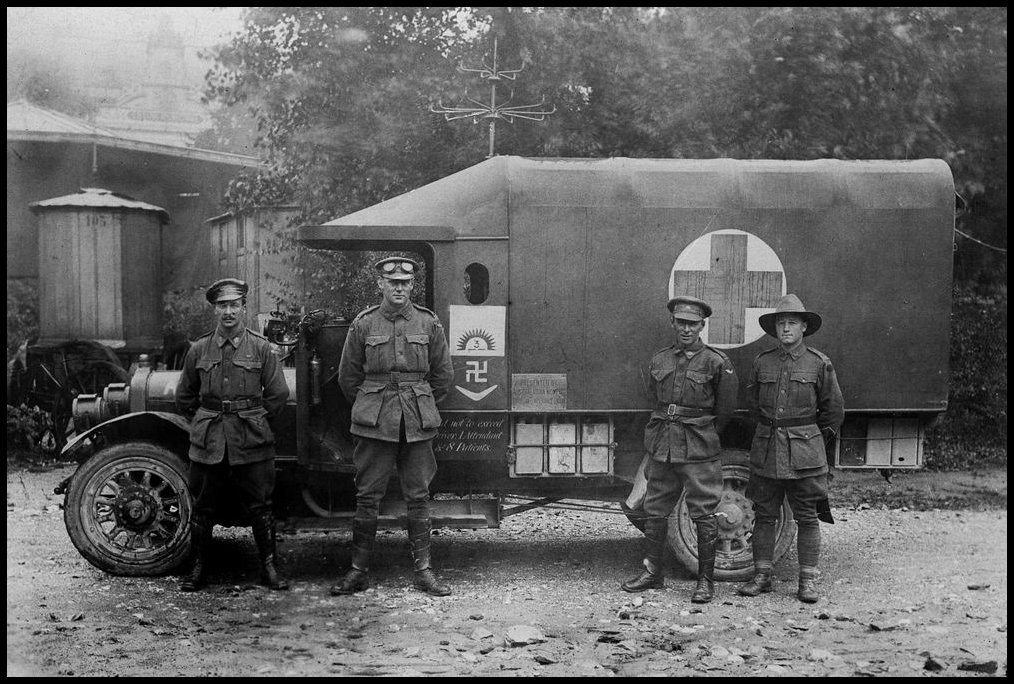
Sunbeam ambulance 1916

===== Vehicles and aircraft =====
During the First World War Sunbeam built trucks and ambulances. It also participated in the Society of British Aircraft Constructors pool which shared aircraft designs with anyone that could build them. In this role Sunbeam produced 15 Short Bombers powered by their own Sunbeam Gurkha engines, 20 Short Type 827s, 50 Short 310s, and others including Avro 504 trainers; they even designed their own Sunbeam Bomber, which lost to a somewhat simpler Sopwith design. Sunbeam had produced 647 aircraft of various types by the time the lines shut down in early 1919.

===== End of an era and sale to Darracq =====
Marston's third son, Roland, had been expected to take over as chairman of Sunbeam but he suddenly died in March 1918 and John Marston himself died the morning after Roland's funeral. He was aged 82. Cureton was already in poor health, and died in 1921. They had made Coatalen a joint managing director in 1914 alongside William Marklew Iliff (1873–1957).

=== S.T.D. Motors ===
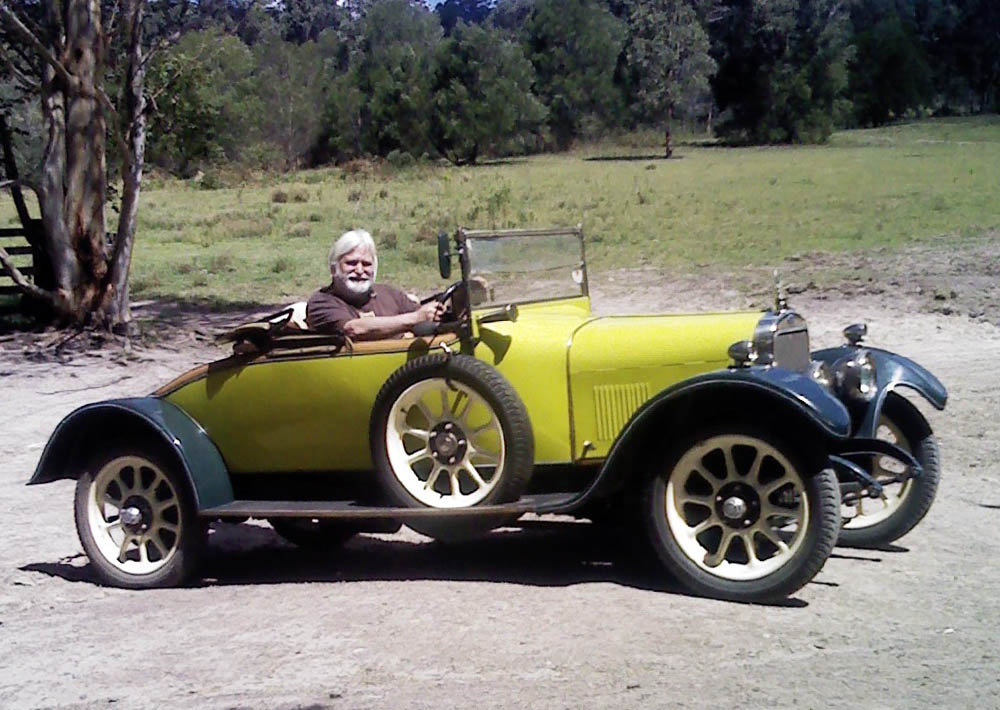
1922 14 open two-seater

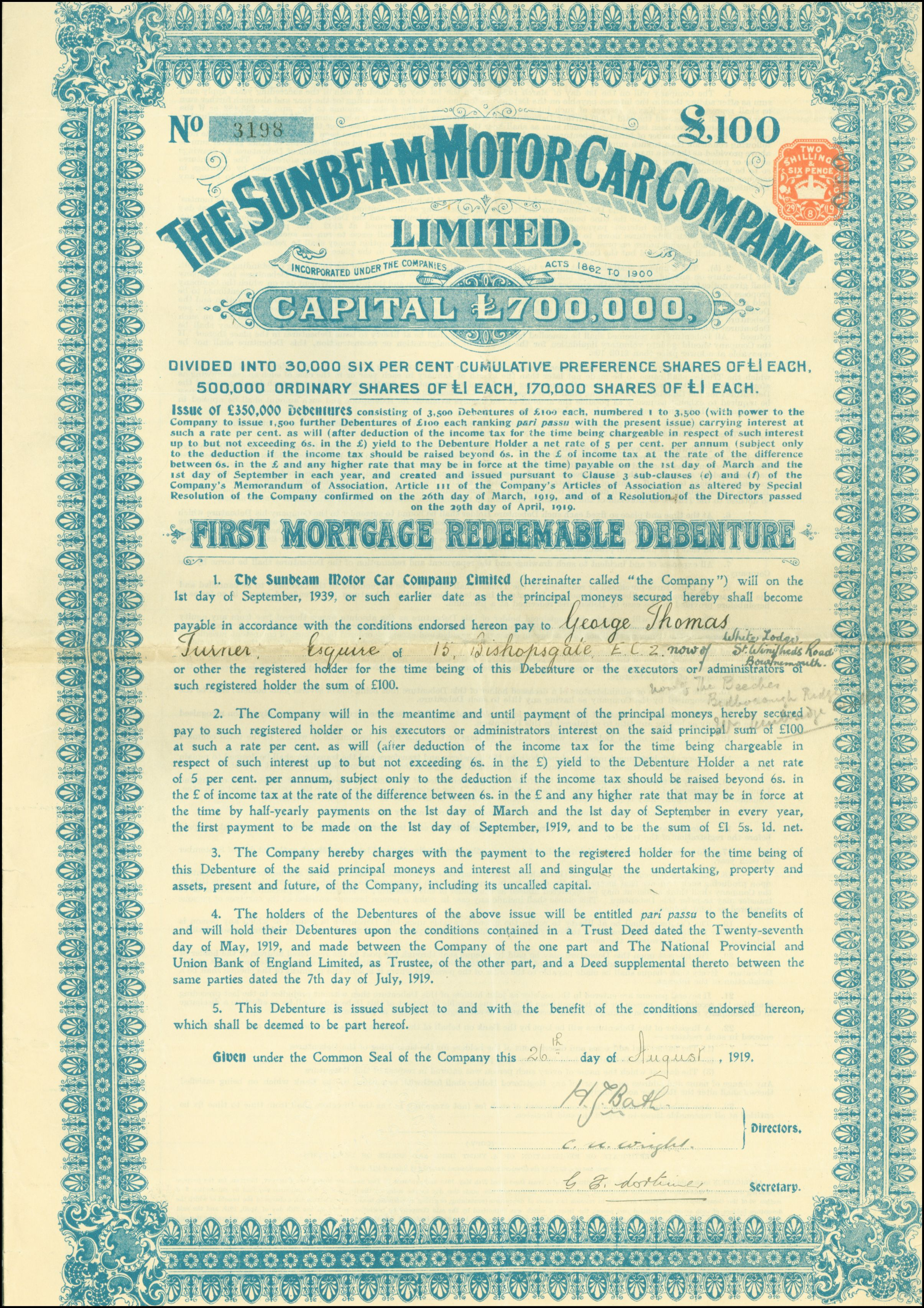
Debenture of the Sunbeam Motor Car Company Ltd., issued 26. August 1919

In June 1920 Darracq bought Wolverhampton's Sunbeam Motor Car Company Limited. In 1919, following the First World War, Darracq had bought a London motor manufacturer, Clément-Talbot. The Sunbeam Talbot and Darracq businesses retained their separate identities. The Sunbeam car continued to be made at Moorfield Works, Wolverhampton, the Talbot in North Kensington and the Darracq at Suresnes with central buying, selling, administration and advertising departments with S T D in Britain On 13 August 1920 Darracq changed its name to S T D Motors Limited. The initials represented Sunbeam, Talbot and Darracq.

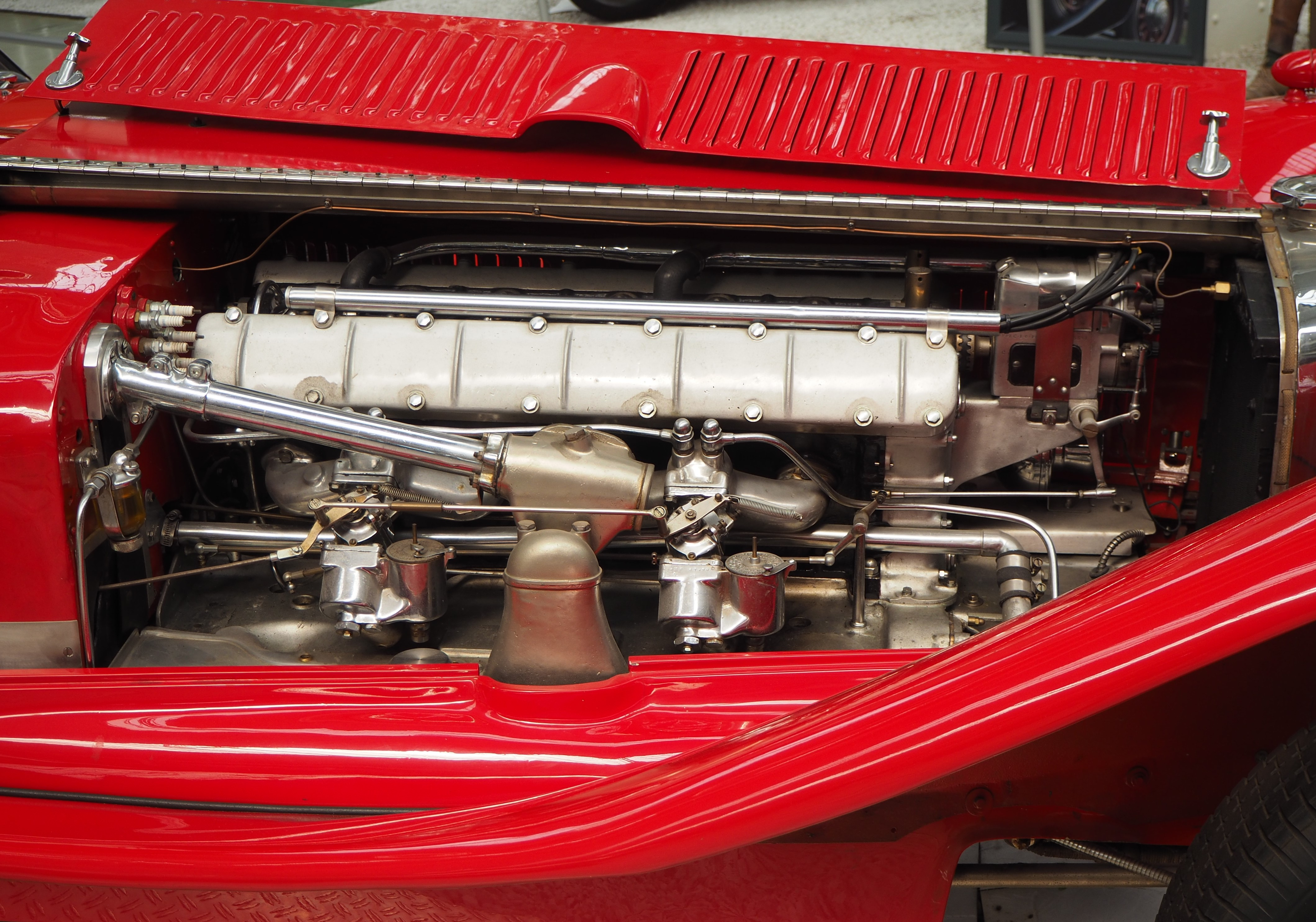
1927 racing DOHC 3-litre

S.T.D. Motors Limited had been first incorporated in London in 1905, at that time bearing the name A Darracq and Company (1905) Limited, though it continued to manufacture its Darracq cars in Suresnes, Paris.

S T D Motors Limited group in 1924
Clement-Talbot Limited: Talbot cars
Darracq Motor Engineering Company Limited: motorcar bodies and assembly of French-sourced Talbot components for sale in the British market as Darracq-Talbot cars.
Sunbeam Motor Car Company Limited: Sunbeam cars
Jonas Woodhead & Sons Limited: automobile springs

in France

Automobiles Talbot SA: Talbot cars (until 1921 named Automobiles Darracq SA: Darracq cars)
Darracq Proprietary Company Limited: held those French assets not held by Automobiles Talbot SA

other investments

W & G Du Cros Limited: Yellow Taxi-cabs, charabanc and bus bodies, motorcar bodies and assembly of French-sourced Talbot components for sale in the British market as Darracq-Talbot cars.
Heenan & Froude Limited, constructional engineers

=== Closedown and sale of brandname ===
Sunbeam did not survive the Great Depression. It fell into receivership in 1934 and was sold by the receiver to the Rootes brothers.

== Products ==
=== Production cars ===
When at its height in the 1920s, Sunbeam Motor Car Company's Moorfield works employed 3,500 staff on its 50-acre site. The buildings covered 15 acres.

Under VSCC rules, all cars made in Wolverhampton after WW1 qualify as vintage, and as post-vintage thoroughbreds after 1 January 1931. All cars built before the end of the First World War are covered by the VCC.

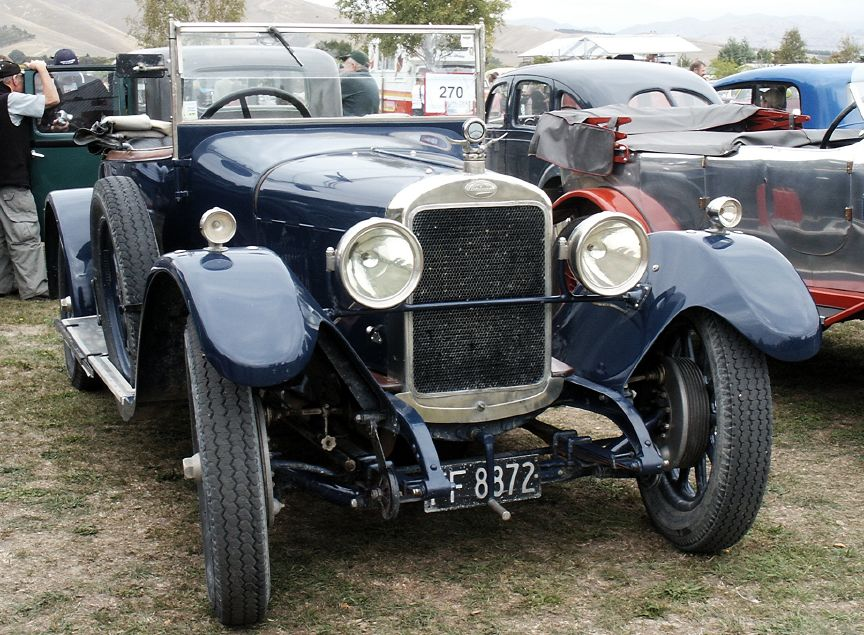
1924 14/40 open two-seater

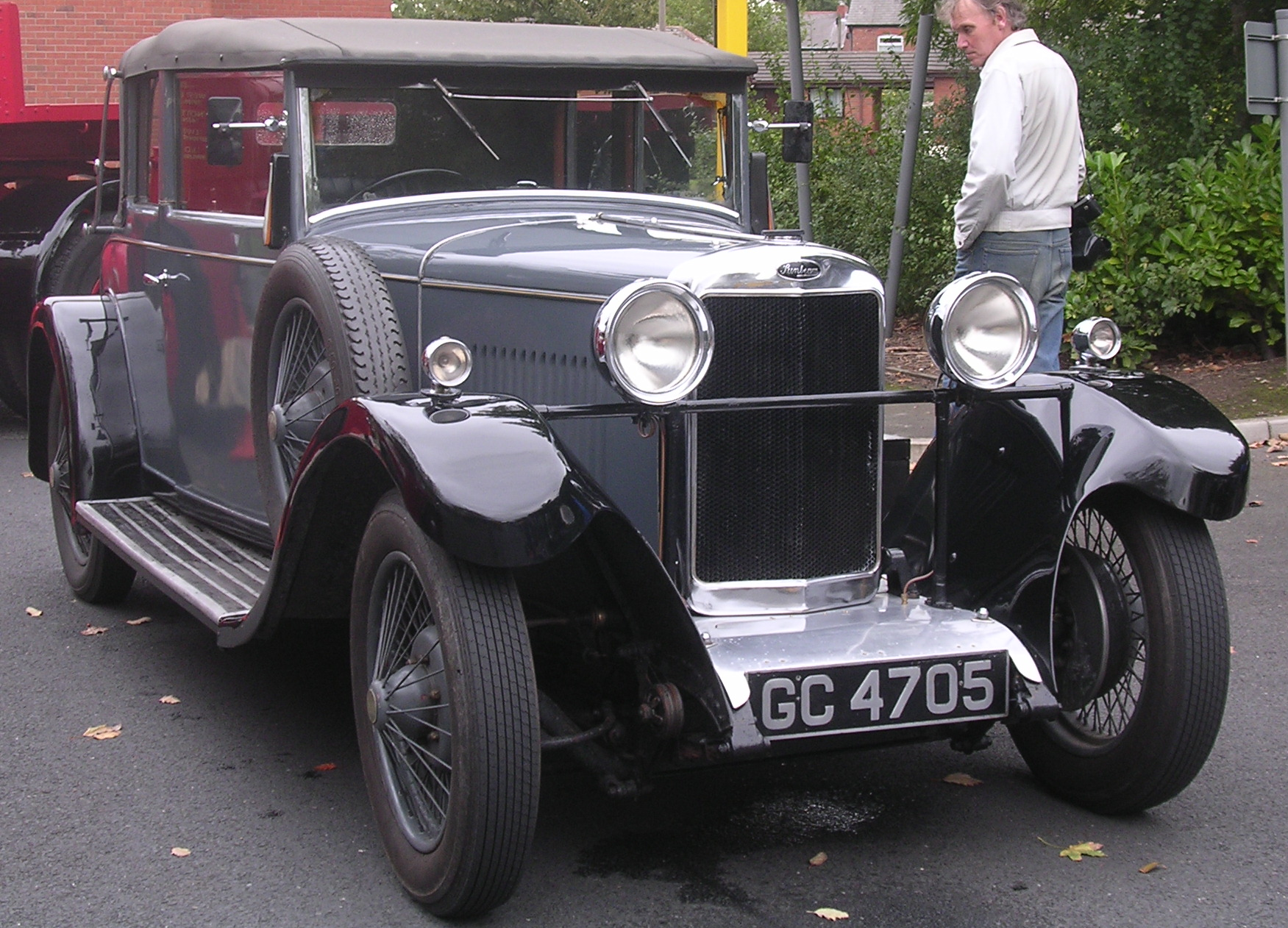
1930 16 four-seater drophead coupé by James Young

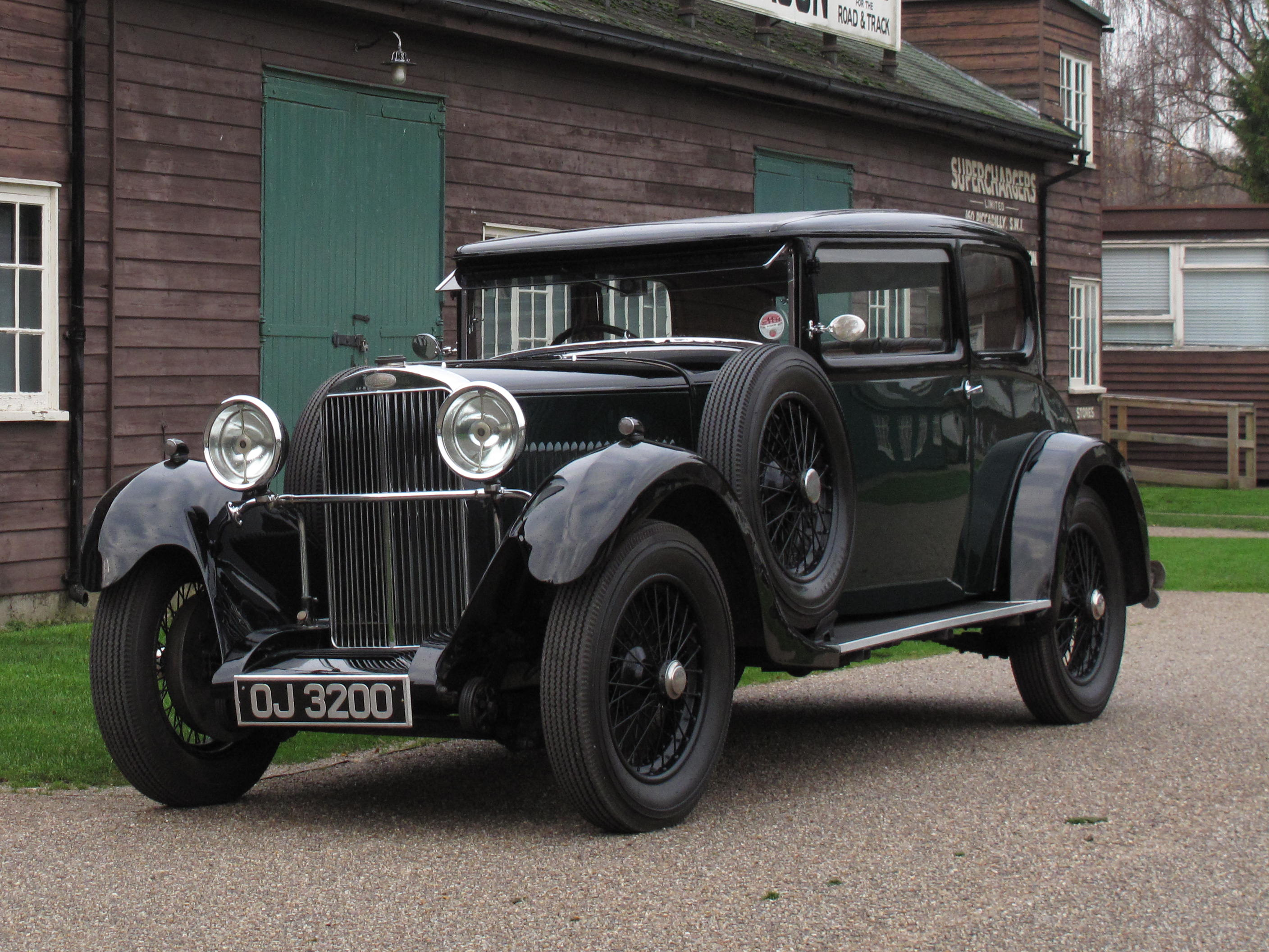
1932 20 doctor's coupé

Coatalen's obsession with improvement meant that there were numerous small changes in models from year to year. Therefore, although his designs are basically similar, few parts are interchangeable. Two models dominated production:

- 1920–24 16 hp, 16/40, 24 hp, 24/60 and 24/70 all based on pre-war designs
- 1922–23 14 hp, the first post-war four-cylinder
- 1924 12/30 and 16/50 only produced in small numbers
- 1924–26 14/40 and big brother 20/60 developed from 14 hp with two more cylinders added.
- 1926–30 3-litre Super Sports, Sunbeam's Bentley rival.
- 1926–30 16 hp (known as "16.9") and 20 hp (known as "20.9"). Two new designs with six-cylinder integral cast iron block and crankcase. Both were produced over many years. The 20.9 with a 3-litre engine producing 70 bhp shared components with the 3-litre Super Sports (brakes, suspension, steering, axles, gearbox, transmission).
- 1926–32 20/60 developed into 25 hp with bore increased from 75 to 80 mm. A few 8-cylinder cars produced in this period, 30 hp & 35 hp.
- 1930–32 16 hp bore increased from 67 to 70 mm, (known as "18.2").
- 1931–33 New model 20 hp (known as "23.8") introduced with 80 mm bore and 7 main bearings rated at 23.8 hp.
- 1933–34 New model Speed 20 consisting of 20.9 hp engine resurrected with improved exhaust manifold and downdraught carb installed in new cruciform braced chassis.
- 1933 18.2 hp engine installed in Speed 20 chassis and renamed 'Twenty'.
- 1933–35 Twenty-Five introduced with modified 1931–33 23.8 hp engine.
- 1934 Twenty given the 20.9 engine in place of the 18.2.
- 1934–35 Dawn introduced. 12.8 engine and IFS.
- 1935 Speed 20 renamed Sports 21 with redesigned body style.
- 1935 Sports 21 given a high compression version of Twenty-Five engine.

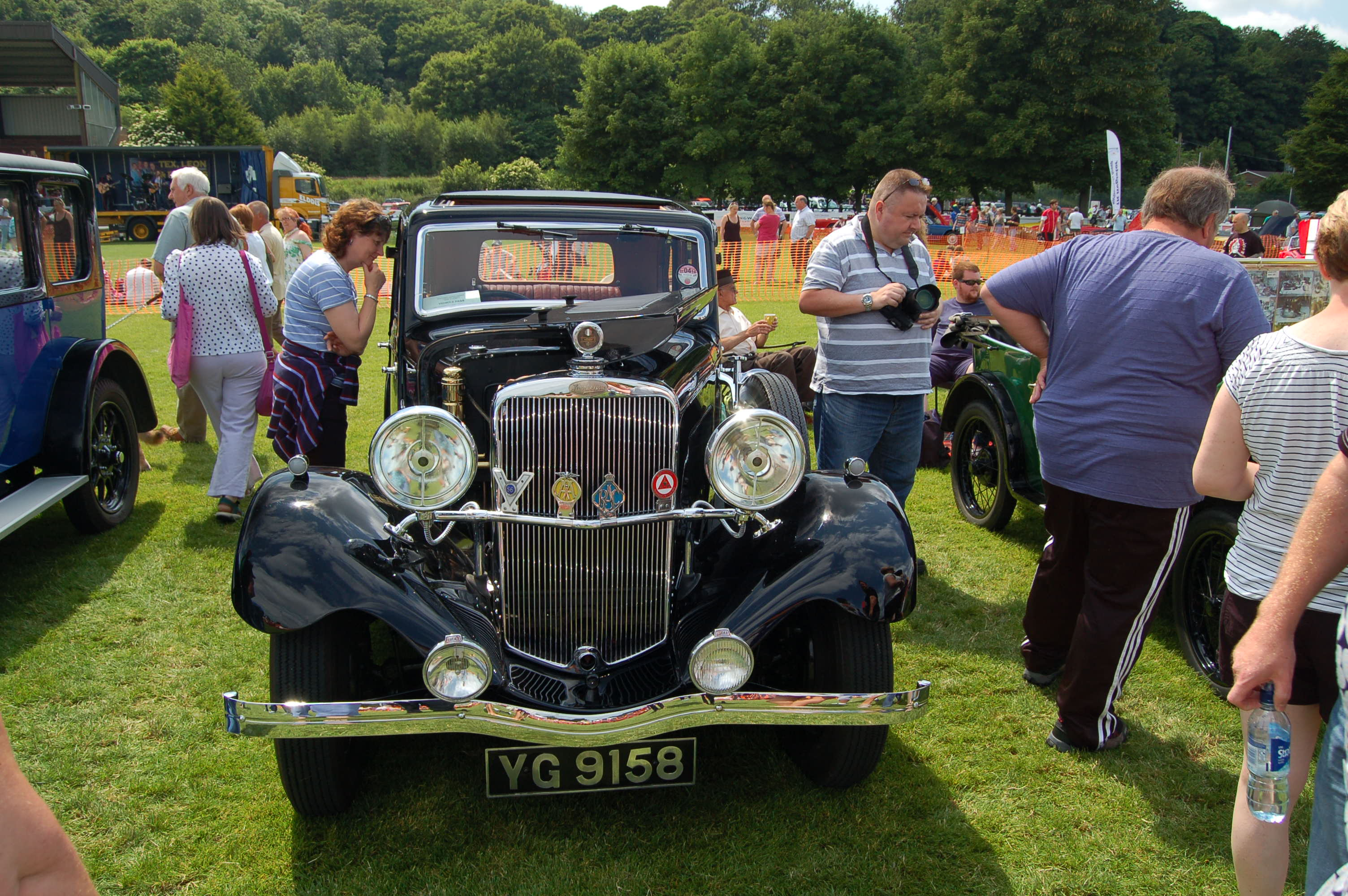
1934 a new Dawn registered November 1934

The most successful, judged by volumes, was the 16 hp (16.9) followed by 20 hp (20.9) made from 1926 to 1930. Whilst the 16 was solid and very reliable, it was a little underpowered at 2.1 litres; the 20.9 made a big jump to 3 litres and 70 bhp (52 kW; 71 PS) with similar body weight and vacuum servo brakes and was capable of 70 mph (110 km/h).

Sunbeam built their own bodies but also supplied to the coachbuilder trade; many limousines were built on Sunbeam chassis. The sales catalogue illustrates the standard body designs.

Financial difficulties arose in the early years of the Great Depression and just before the opening of the October 1934 Olympia Motor Show an application was made to the court for an appointment of a receiver and manager for the two major subsidiaries of S T D, Sunbeam and Automobiles Talbot France. Clément-Talbot remained profitable and was sold to the Rootes brothers. It proved impossible for the directors to avoid the appointment of a receiver to Sunbeam Motor Car Company and S T D was unable to complete its sale to Rootes. However six months later in July 1935 Rootes Securities announced they had bought Sunbeam Motor Car Company and its subsidiary Sunbeam Commercial Vehicles.

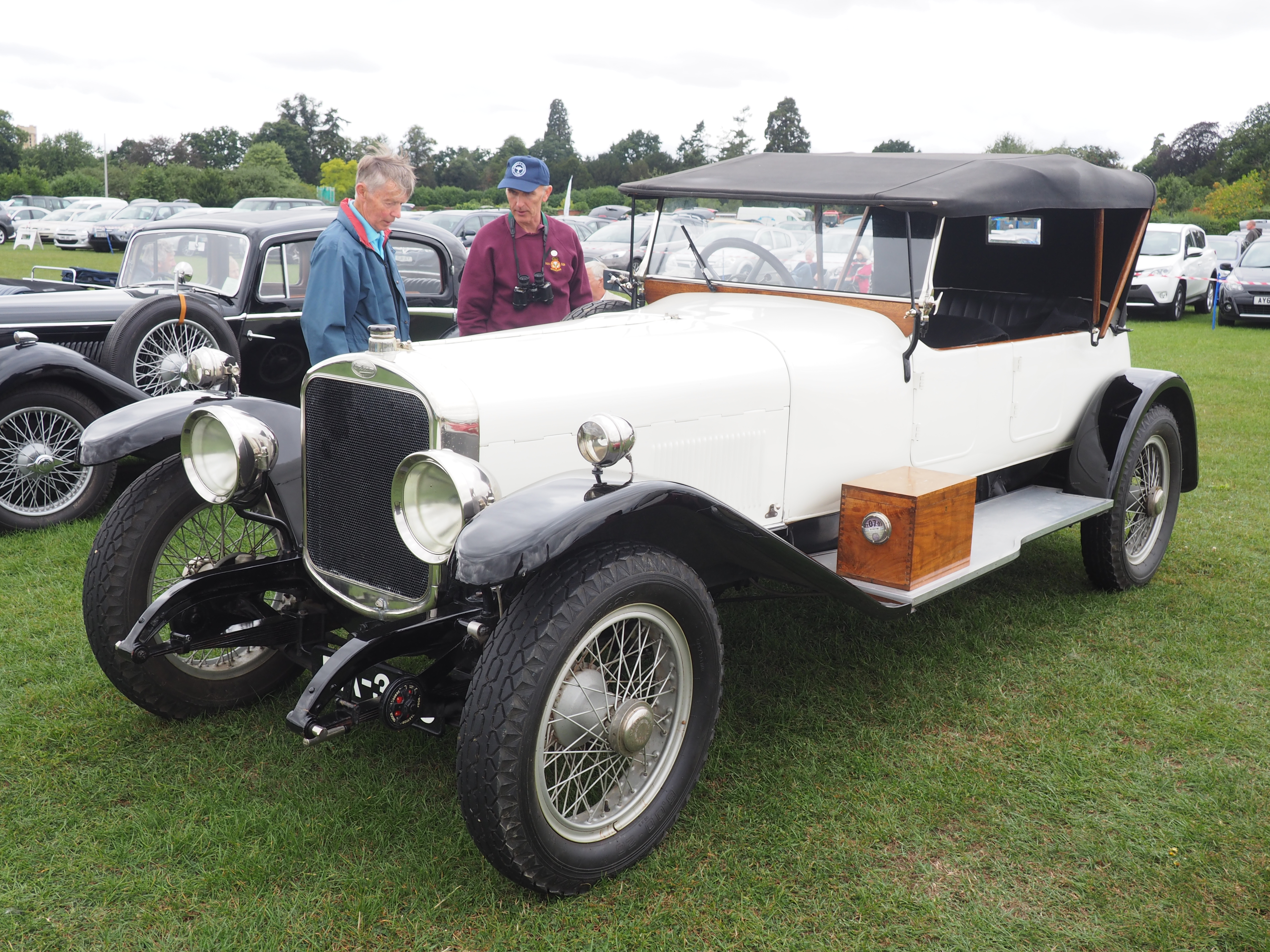
1922 24/60 open tourer

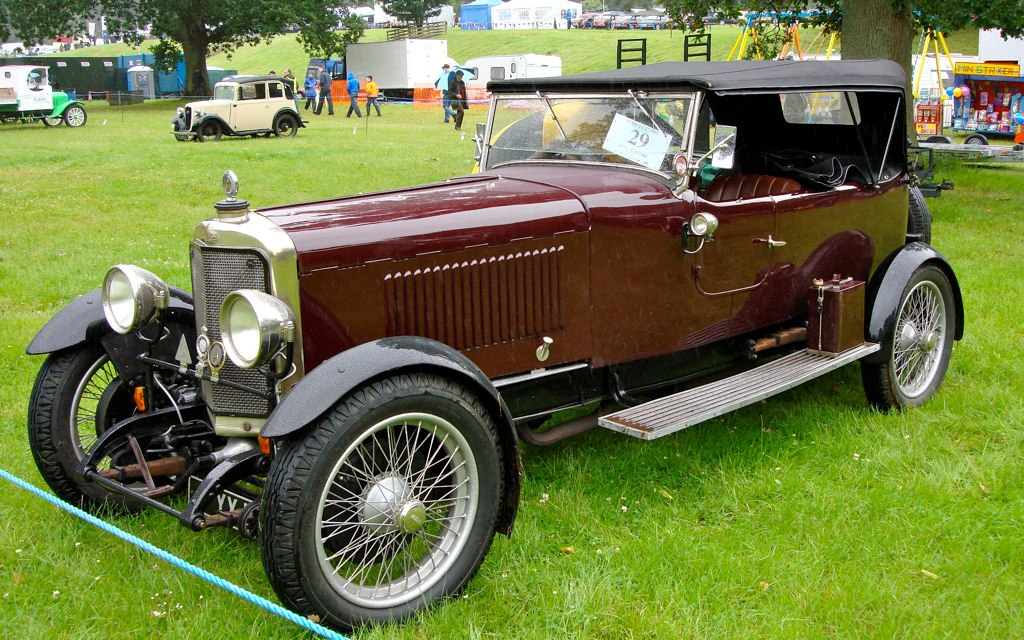
1927 3-litre Super Sports open tourer

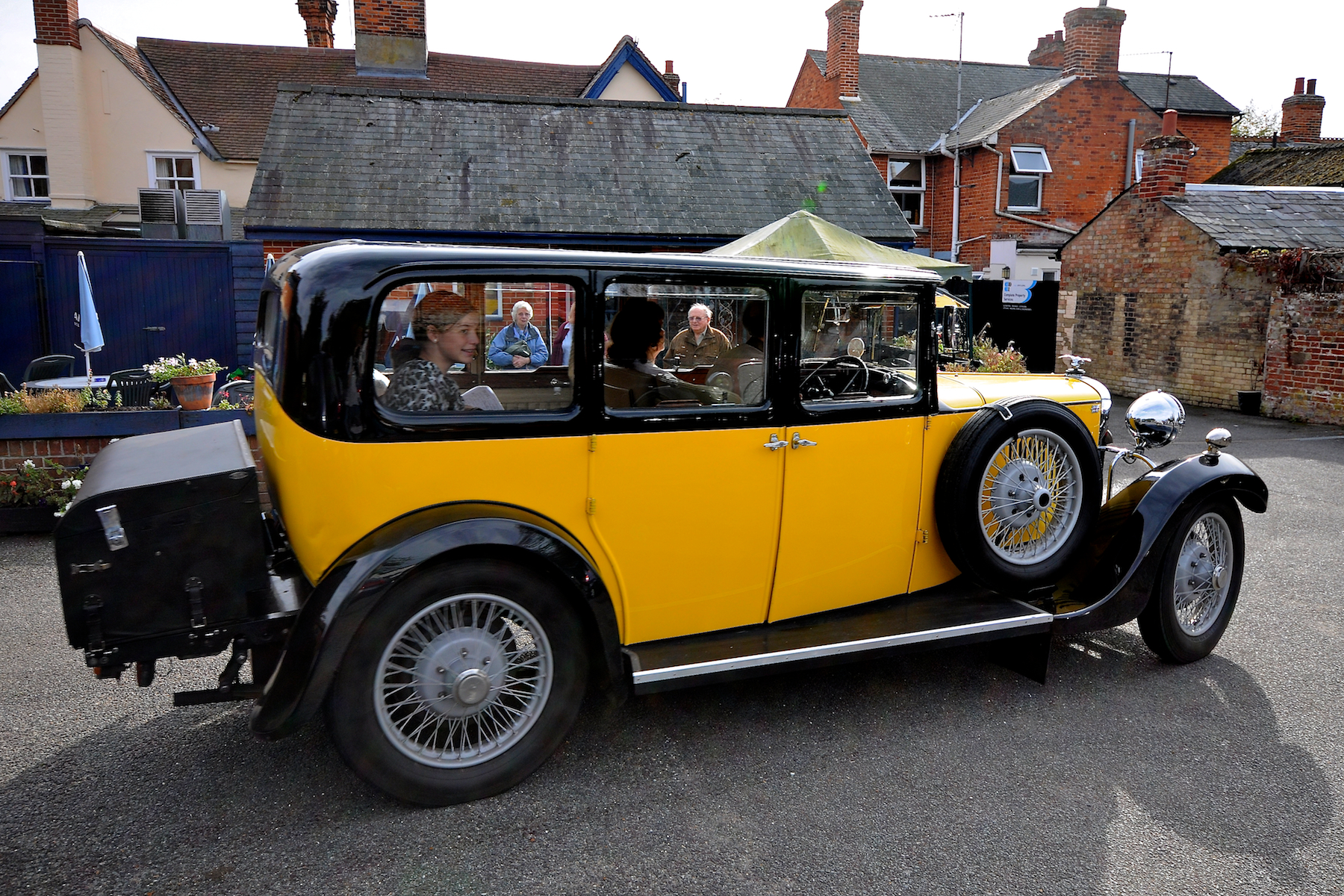
1932 16 six-light saloon

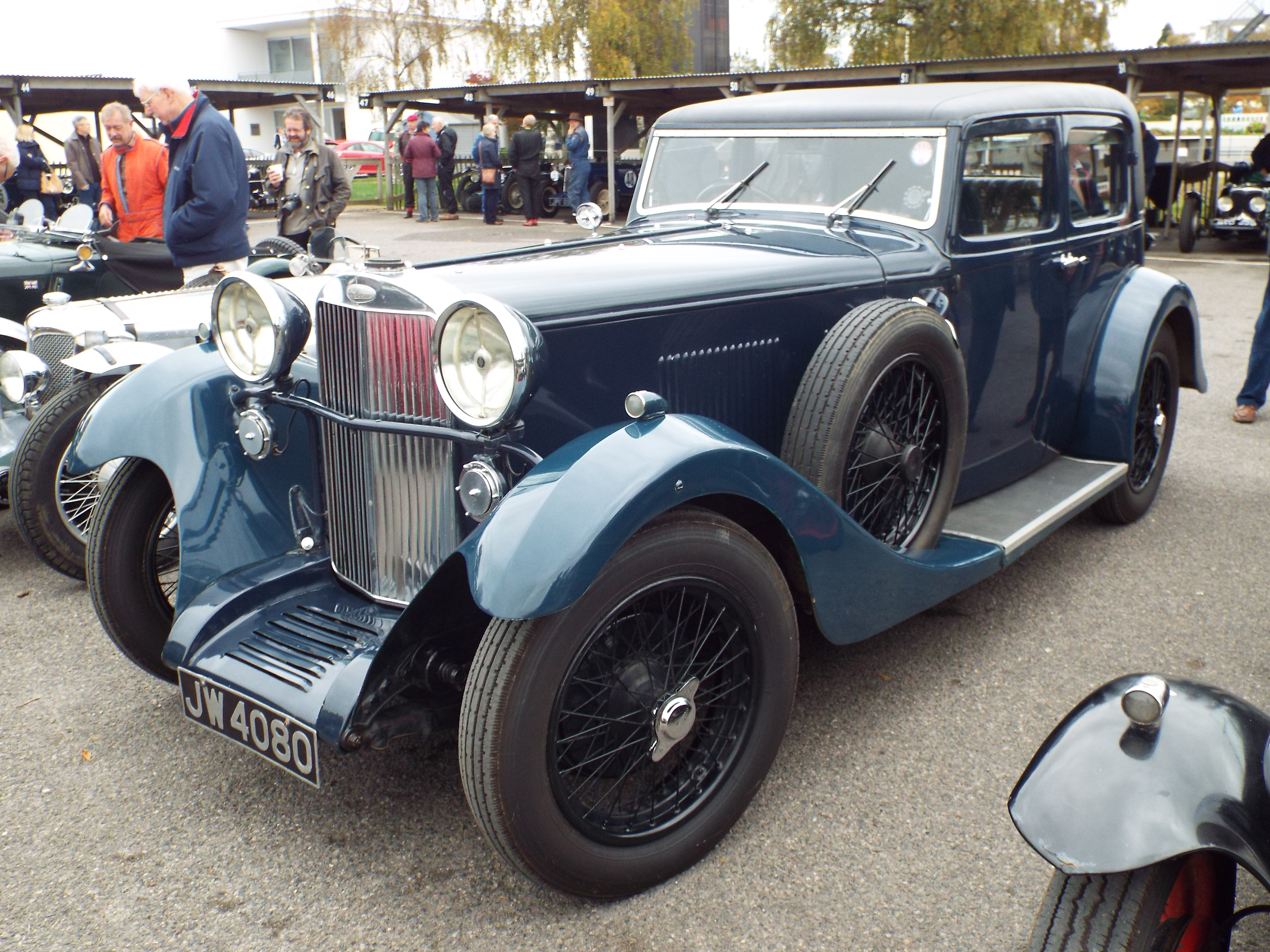
1934 20 sports saloon

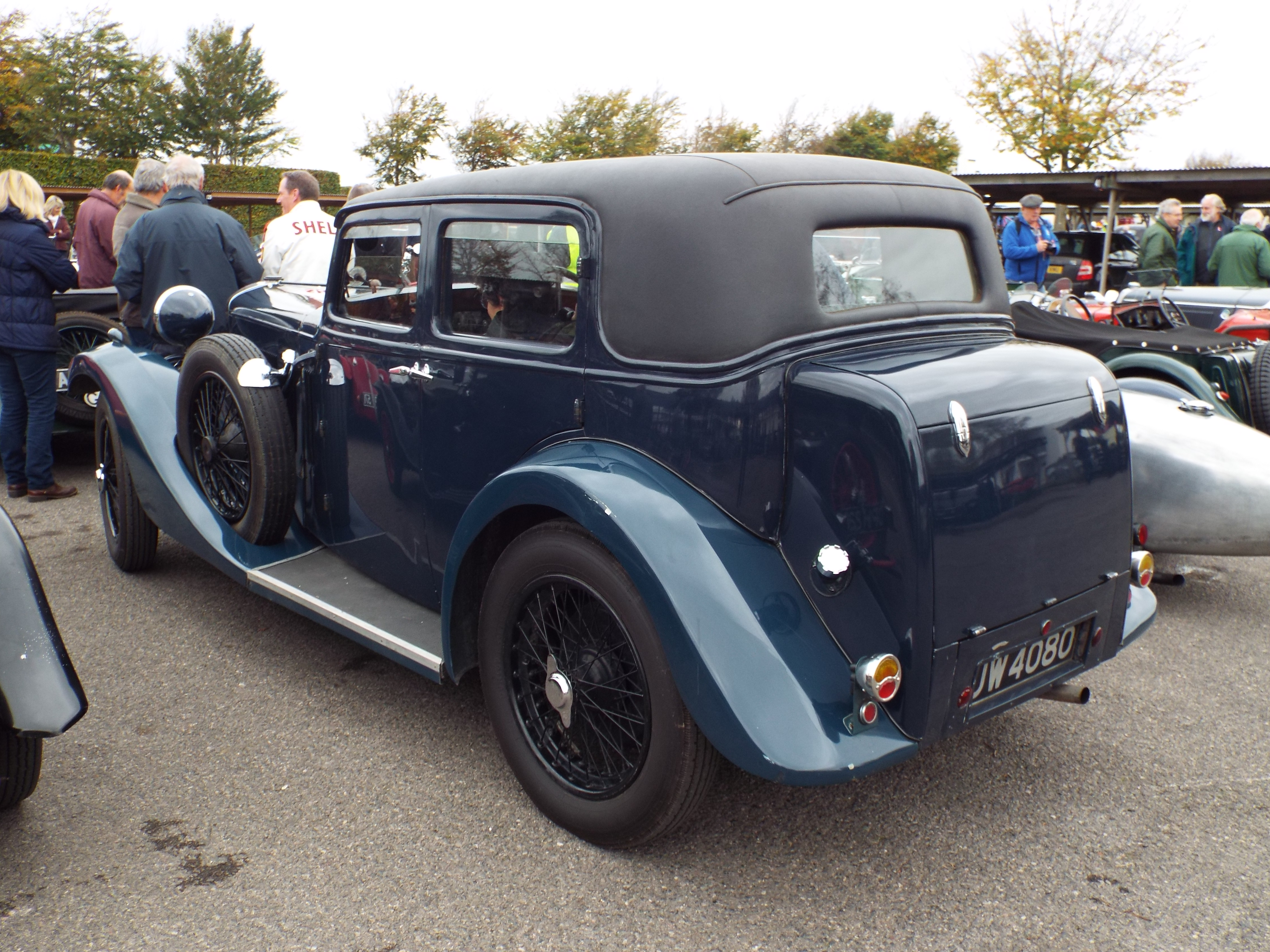
1934 20 sports saloon

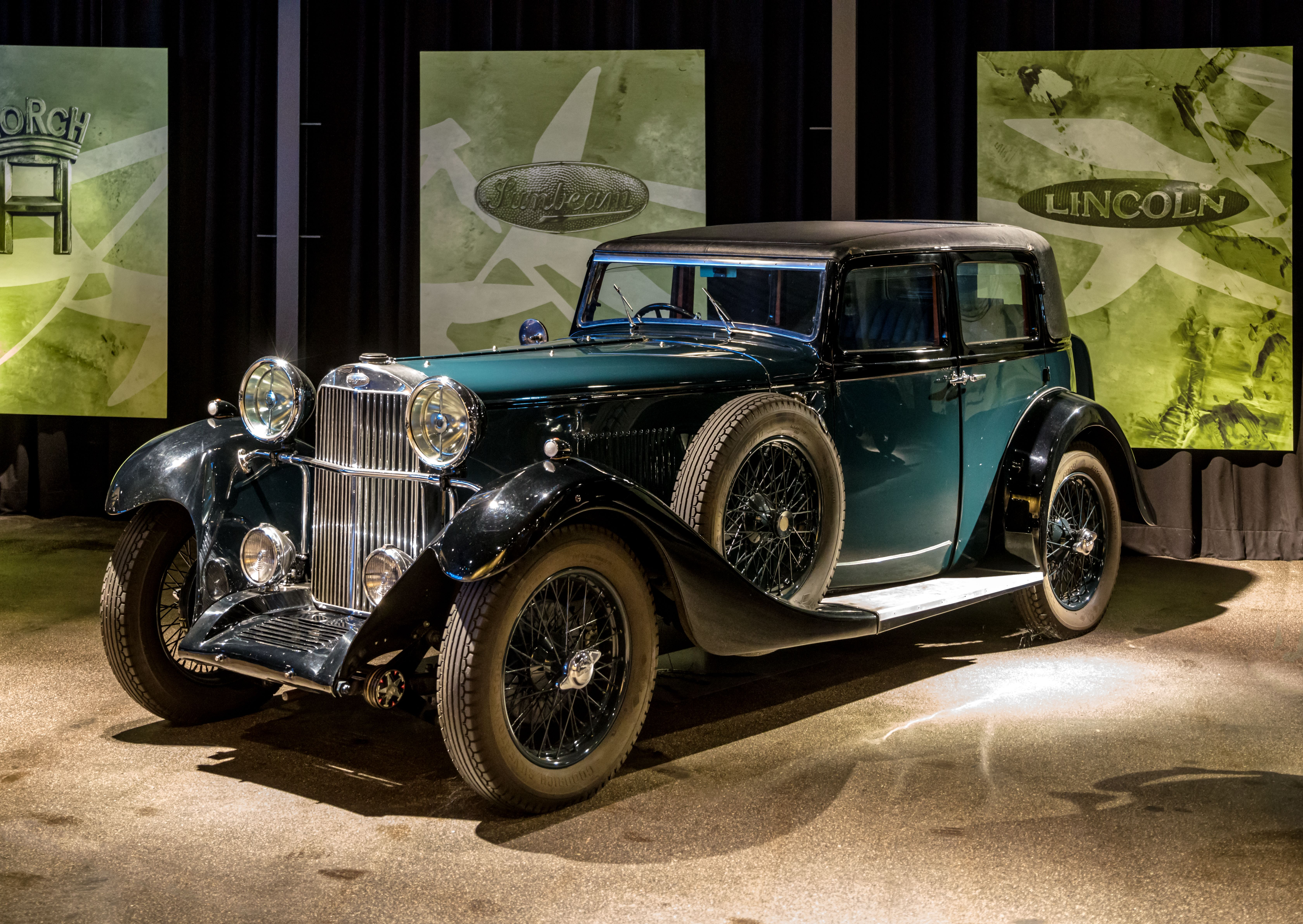
1934 Speed 20 sports saloon

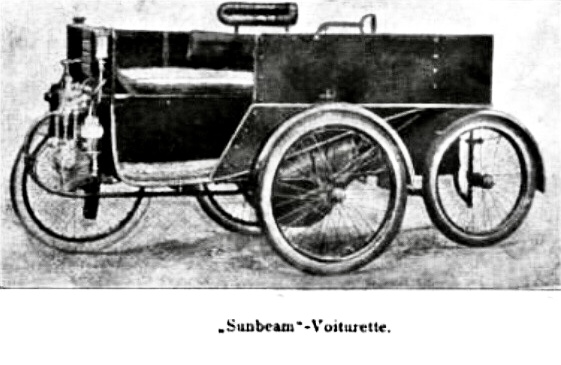
Sunbeam Mabley (1901-1904)

The following cars were built by Sunbeam Motor Car Company Limited.

| Years in production | Name | Tax HP (RAC) | Cylinders | Bore/ stroke (mm) | Disp (cc) | Valves | Brakes | BHP @ rpm |
|---|---|---|---|---|---|---|---|---|
| 1901-1904 | Mabley | | 1 | | 326 | | | |
| 1903–1904 | 12 | 15.9 | 4 | 80 × 120 | 2412 | ioe | RWB | – @ 1200 |
| 1904 | 16 | 23.8 | 6 | 80 × 120 | 3618 | T-head | RWB | |
| 1905 | 12 | 17.5 | 4 | 84 × 120 | 2660 | T-head | RWB | 12 @ 1200 |
| 1906 | 16 | 22.4 | 4 | 95 × 120 | 3402 | L-head | RWB | – @ 900 |
| 1907 | 16/20 | 22.4 | 4 | 95 × 120 | 3402 | L-head | RWB | – @ 900 |
| 1907 | 25/30 | 33.6 | 6 | 95 × 120 | 5103 | L-head | RWB | |
| 1908–1909 | 20 | 27.3 | 4 | 105 × 130 | 4503 | L-head | RWB | |
| 1908–1909 | 35 | 35.7 | 4 | 120 × 140 | 6333 | L-head | RWB | |
| 1909 | 14/18 | 22.4 | 4 | 95 × 120 | 3402 | L-head | RWB | |
| 1909 | 14/20 | 22.4 | 4 | 95 × 135 | 3828 | T-head | RWB | 54 @ 2300 |
| 1909 | 16 | 17.9 | 2 | 120 × 140 | 3167 | L-head | RWB | |
| 1910–1911 | 12/16 | 15.9 | 4 | 80 × 120 | 2412 | T-head | RWB | 58 @ 2600 |
| 1910–1911 | 16/20 | 22.4 | 4 | 95 × 135 | 3828 | T-head | RWB | |
| 1910–1911 | 25/30 | 27.3 | 4 | 105 × 135 | 4676 | T-head | RWB | |
| 1911 | 18/22 | 23.8 | 6 | 80 x 120 | 3618 | T-head | RWB | 46 @ 2000 |
| 1912–1914 | 12/16 | 15.9 | 4 | 80 × 150 | 3016 | L-head | RWB | |
| 1912–1914 | 16/20 | 20.1 | 4 | 90 × 160 | 4070 | L-head | RWB | |
| 1912–1914 | 25/30 | 30.1 | 6 | 90 × 160 | 6105 | L-head | RWB | |
| 1919–1921 | 16 hp | 15.9 | 4 | 80 × 150 | 3016 | L-head | RWB | |
| 1919–1921 | 24 hp | 23.8 | 6 | 80 × 150 | 4524 | L-head | RWB | |
| 1922 | 16 hp | 15.9 | 4 | 80 × 150 | 3016 | SOHC | RWB | 16v 8 plugs |
| 1922 | 16 hp | 15.9 | 4 | 80 × 150 | 3016 | OHV | RWB | |
| 1922 | 24 hp | 23.8 | 6 | 80 × 150 | 4524 | SOHC | RWB | 24v 12 plugs |
| 1922 | 24 hp | 23.8 | 6 | 80 × 150 | 4524 | OHV | RWB | |
| 1922–1923 | 14 hp | 12.9 | 4 | 72 × 120 | 1954 | OHV | RWB | |
| 1923 | 16/40 | 15.9 | 4 | 80 × 150 | 3016 | OHV | | |
| 1923 | 24/60 | 23.8 | 6 | 80 × 150 | 4524 | OHV | | 63 @ 2700 |
| 1924 | 16/50 | 18.2 | 6 | 70 × 110 | 2540 | OHV | | |
| 1924 | 24/70 | 23.8 | 6 | 80 × 150 | 4524 | OHV | | |
| 1924–1926 | 12/30 | 11.5 | 4 | 68 × 110 | 1598 | OHV | RWB | |
| 1924–1926 | 14/40 | 14 | 4 | 75 × 120 | 2121 | OHV | | 41 @ 2800 |
| 1924–1926 | 20/60 | 20.9 | 6 | 75 × 120 | 3181 | OHV | | |
| 1926 | Thirty | 31.7 | 8 | 80 × 112 | 4503 | OHV | | |
| 1926 | 30/90 | 31.7 | 8 | 80 × 120 | 4825 | OHV | | |
| 1926 | 30/90 | 35.8 | 8 | 85 × 120 | 5448 | OHV | | |
| 1926–1930 | 3-litre | 20.9 | 6 | 75 × 110 | 2916 | DOHC | | 93 @ 4000 |
| 1926–1930 | 20 hp (20.9) | 20.9 | 6 | 75 × 110 | 2916 | OHV | | 70 @ 3500 |
| 1927–1928 | 30 hp | 31.7 | 8 | 80 × 120 | 4825 | OHV | | |
| 1927–1929 | 35 hp | 35.8 | 8 | 85 × 120 | 5448 | OHV | | |
| 1927–1930 | 16 hp (16.9) | 16.9 | 6 | 67.5 × 95 | 2040 | OHV | | 44 @ 4000 |
| 1927–1932 | 25 hp | 23.8 | 6 | 80 × 120 | 3618 | OHV | | 72 @ 2900 |
| 1931–1933 | 16 hp (18.2) | 18.2 | 6 | 70 × 95 | 2193 | OHV | | 44 @ 4000 |
| 1931–1933 | 20 hp (23.8) | 23.8 | 6 | 80 × 110 | 3317 | OHV | | 74 @ 3250 |
| 1934 | Twenty | 18.2 | 6 | 70 × 95 | 2193 | OHV | | |
| 1934 | Dawn | 12.9 | 4 | 72 × 100 | 1627 | OHV | | 49 @ 4200 |
| 1934–1935 | Speed 20 | 20.9 | 6 | 75 × 110 | 2916 | OHV | | 72 @ 3600 |
| 1934–1935 | Twenty Five | 23.8 | 6 | 80 × 110 | 3317 | OHV | | 74 @ 3250 |
| 1935 | Twenty | 19.8 | 6 | 73 × 110 | 2762 | OHV | | 59 @ 3600 |
| 1936 | Thirty | 31.7 | 8 | 80 × 112 | 4503 | OHV | | Roesch prototype |

=== Commercial vehicles ===
==== Buses ====
Car production was terminated but trolleybus production continued. Karrier's trolleybus business was moved from Huddersfield to Moorfield (not Luton with other Karrier operations) and combined with Sunbeam but the same Karrier designs were to be produced. During wartime the factory produced the only trolleybus available in the UK; a four-wheeled double decker known as either the Karrier or Sunbeam W4.

In 1946 soon after the end of the Second World War J. Brockhouse and Co Limited of West Bromwich, the engineering group, bought Sunbeam Commercial Vehicles but in September 1948 sold the trolley-bus part of the business to Guy Motors Limited. who built Sunbeam trolleybuses at their factory until the last was completed in 1964.

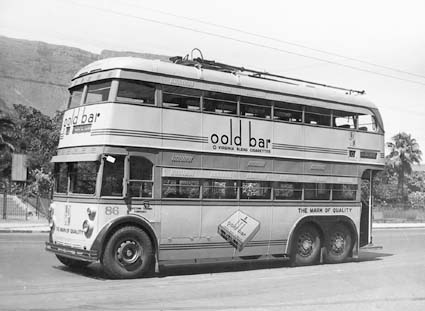
1938-9 MS2 Weymann body Cape Town

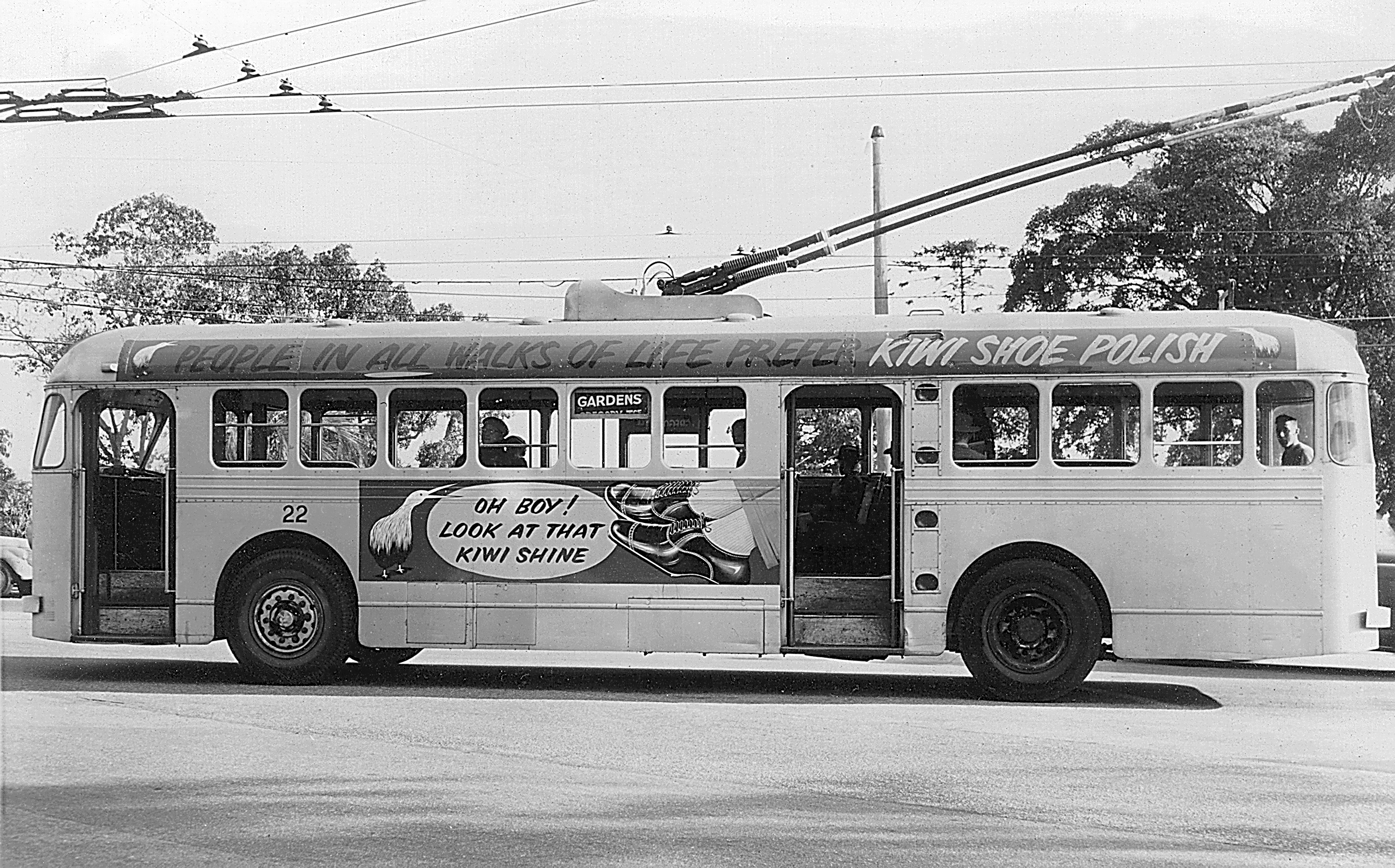
c. 1952 MF2B in Brisbane

==== Double decker buses ====
- Sikh 1930–1933 (three built)
- Pathan 1930–1938 (at least four built for Woverhampton Corp)
- DF2 1936–1948 (one built for Wolverhampton Corp)

==== Double decker trolleybuses ====
- MS2 1934–1948
- MS3 1934–1948
- MF1 1934–1949
- MF2 1935–1952
- W4 1943–1947
- F4/F4A 1948–1965
- S7/S7A 1948–1958

==== Double or single-deck trolleybus ====
- MF2B 1934–65

Brisbane City Council (Australia) imported Sunbeam single-deck trolleybus chassis from 1951 until 1960. All had been withdrawn by 1969. Two of these, fleet numbers 1 (of 1951, with a body by Charles Hope of Brisbane) and 34 (of 1960, body by Athol Hedges), are preserved at the Brisbane Tramway Museum.

=== Sunbeam-Coatalen aero engines ===
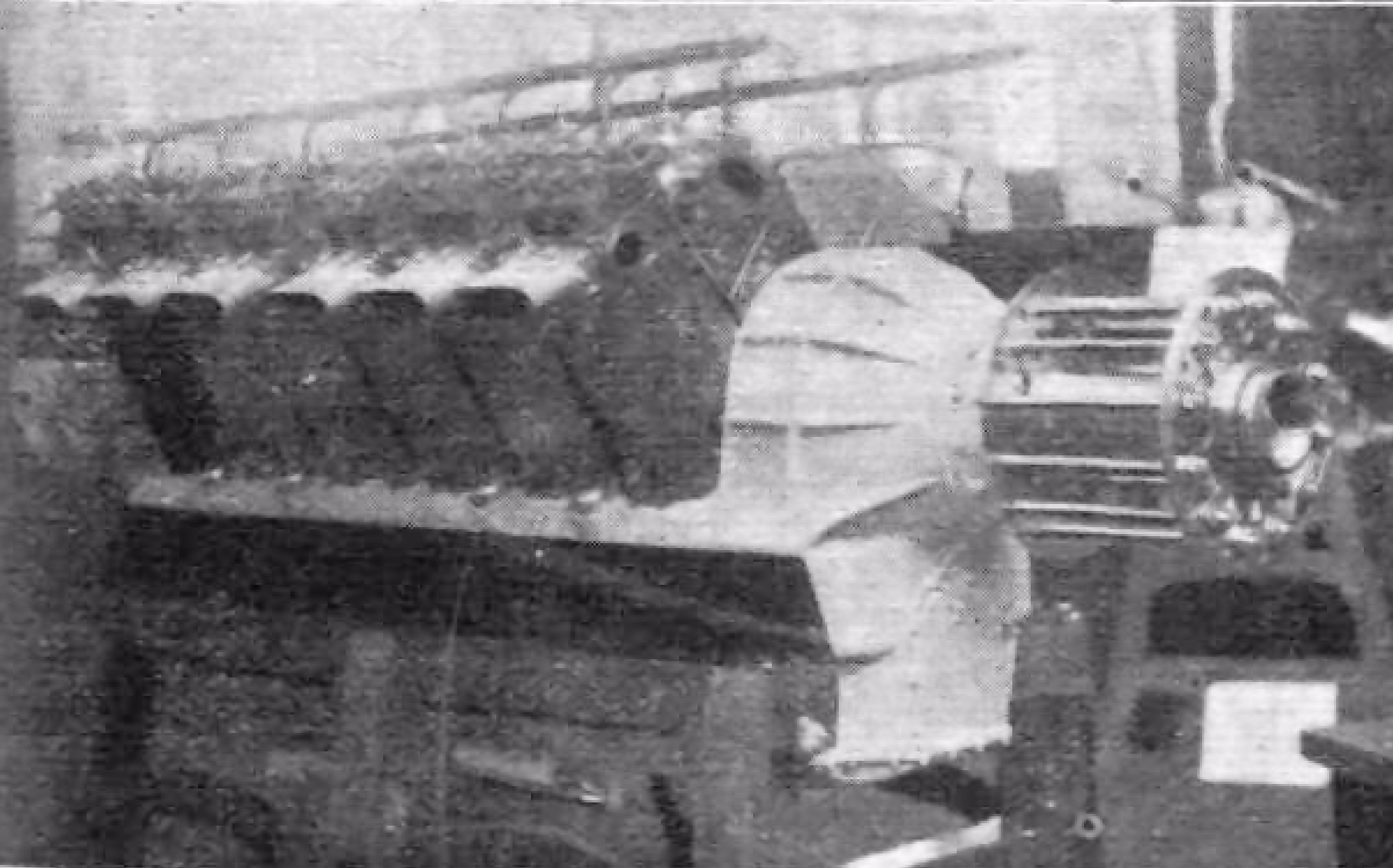
800hp Sunbeam Sikh V-12 water-cooled piston engine at the 1919 Paris Aero Salon

Sunbeam, Wolverhampton, England, started to build aircraft engines in 1912. Louis Coatalen joined Sunbeam as chief engineer in 1909, having previously been Chief Engineer at the Humber works in Coventry. The company quickly became one of the UK's leading engine manufacturers and even designed an aircraft of its own. Sunbeam discontinued the production of aero engines after Coatalen left the company in the 1930s.

- Sunbeam Crusader V8, 150 hp (110 kW)
- Sunbeam Zulu V8, 160 hp (120 kW), developed from Crusader
- Sunbeam Mohawk V12, 225 hp (168 kW)
- Sunbeam Gurkha V12, 240 hp (180 kW), developed from Maori
- Sunbeam Cossack V12, 320 hp (240 kW), 18.4 litres
- Sunbeam Nubian V8, 155 hp (116 kW), 7.7 litres
- Sunbeam Afridi V12, 200 hp (150 kW), 11.476 litres
- Sunbeam Maori V12, 250 hp (190 kW), 14.7 litres, developed from Afridi
- Sunbeam Amazon Straight-6, 160 hp (120 kW), 9.2 litres, developed from Cossack
- Sunbeam Saracen Straight-6, 200 hp (150 kW), 11.2 litres, developed from Amazon
- Sunbeam Viking W18 "Broad Arrow" 450 hp (340 kW), 33.6 litres, developed from Cossack
- Sunbeam Arab V8, 200 hp (150 kW), 11.8 litres
- Sunbeam Bedouin inverted V8, 200 hp (150 kW), 12.3 litres, developed from Arab
- Sunbeam Manitou V12, 325 hp (242 kW), 14.7 litres, developed from Maori
- Sunbeam Tartar V12, 300 hp (220 kW), 15.4 litres
- Sunbeam Kaffir W12 "Broad Arrow" 300 hp (220 kW), developed from Arab, 18.3 litres
- Sunbeam Spartan V12, 200 hp (150 kW), 14 litres, air-cooled
- Sunbeam Matabele V12, 400 hp (300 kW), 22.4 litres, developed from Cossack
- Sunbeam Malay Five-pointed star arrangement of 20 cylinders, 500 hp (370 kW), 29.4 litres
- Sunbeam Pathan Straight-6, 100 hp (75 kW), 8.8 litres, diesel
- Sunbeam Dyak Straight-6, 100 hp (75 kW), 8.8 litres
- Sunbeam Sikh V12, 800 hp (600 kW), 64.1 litres
- Sunbeam Sikh II
- Sunbeam Sikh III
- Sunbeam 2,000hp

=== Grand Prix cars ===
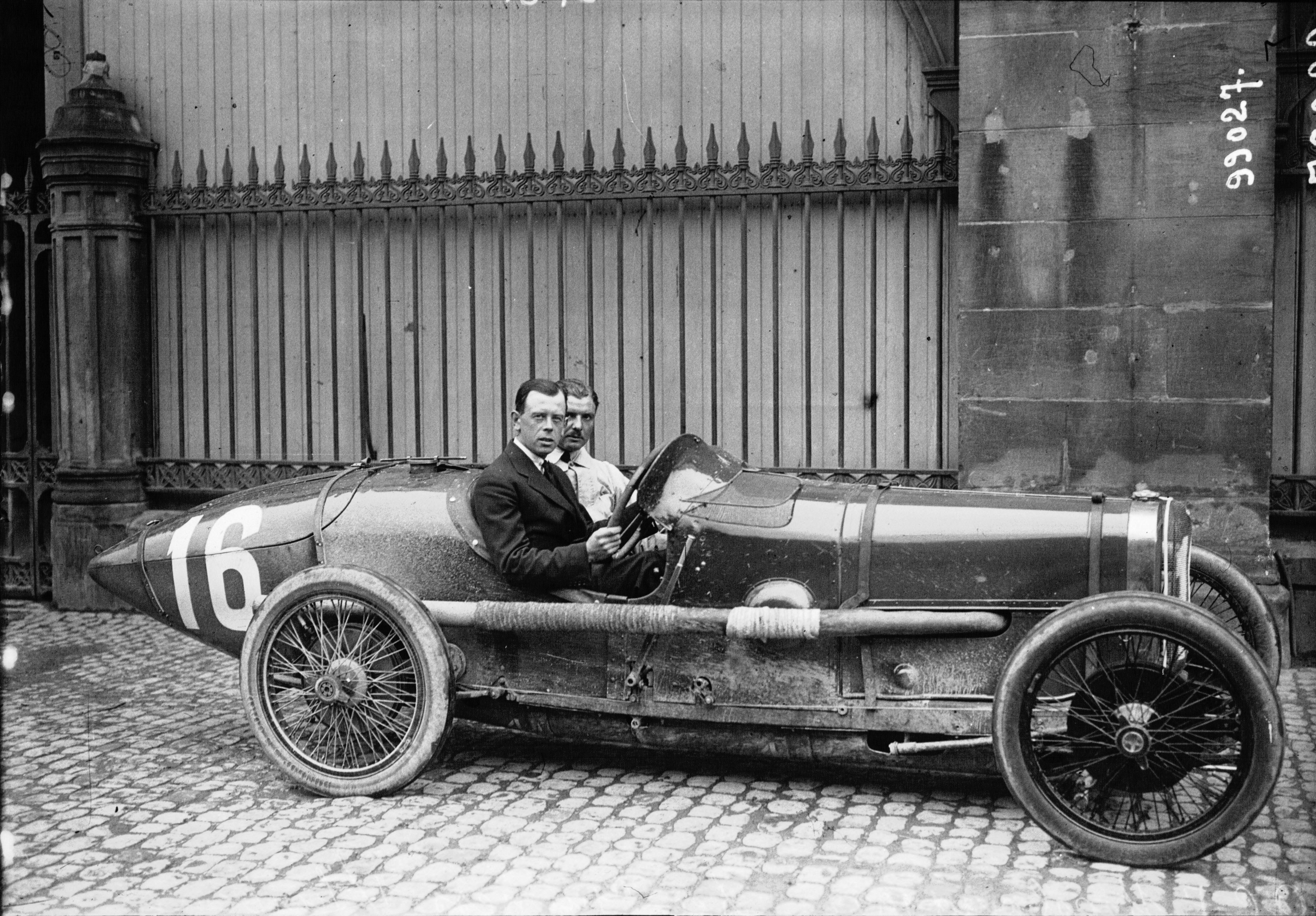
Kenelm Lee Guinness, 1922 French Grand Prix

Coatalen was pleased to build racing cars for Henry Segrave, who won the French and Spanish GPs in 1923/4. In 1921 Segrave participated in his first Grand Prix on Talbot no.10, in effect a re-badged 1921 Grand Prix Sunbeam. This important straight-eight dohc, four valve per cylinder aluminium block car influenced by the great designer Ernest Henry proceeded to win the 1922 Tourist Trophy in the hands of Jean Chassagne.

A different team of 2-litre dohc 1922 Grand Prix Sunbeams designed by Ernest Henry were entered in that year's French Grand Prix. Sunbeam also manufactured the 1923 Sunbeam Grand Prix race car.

=== World land speed record cars ===
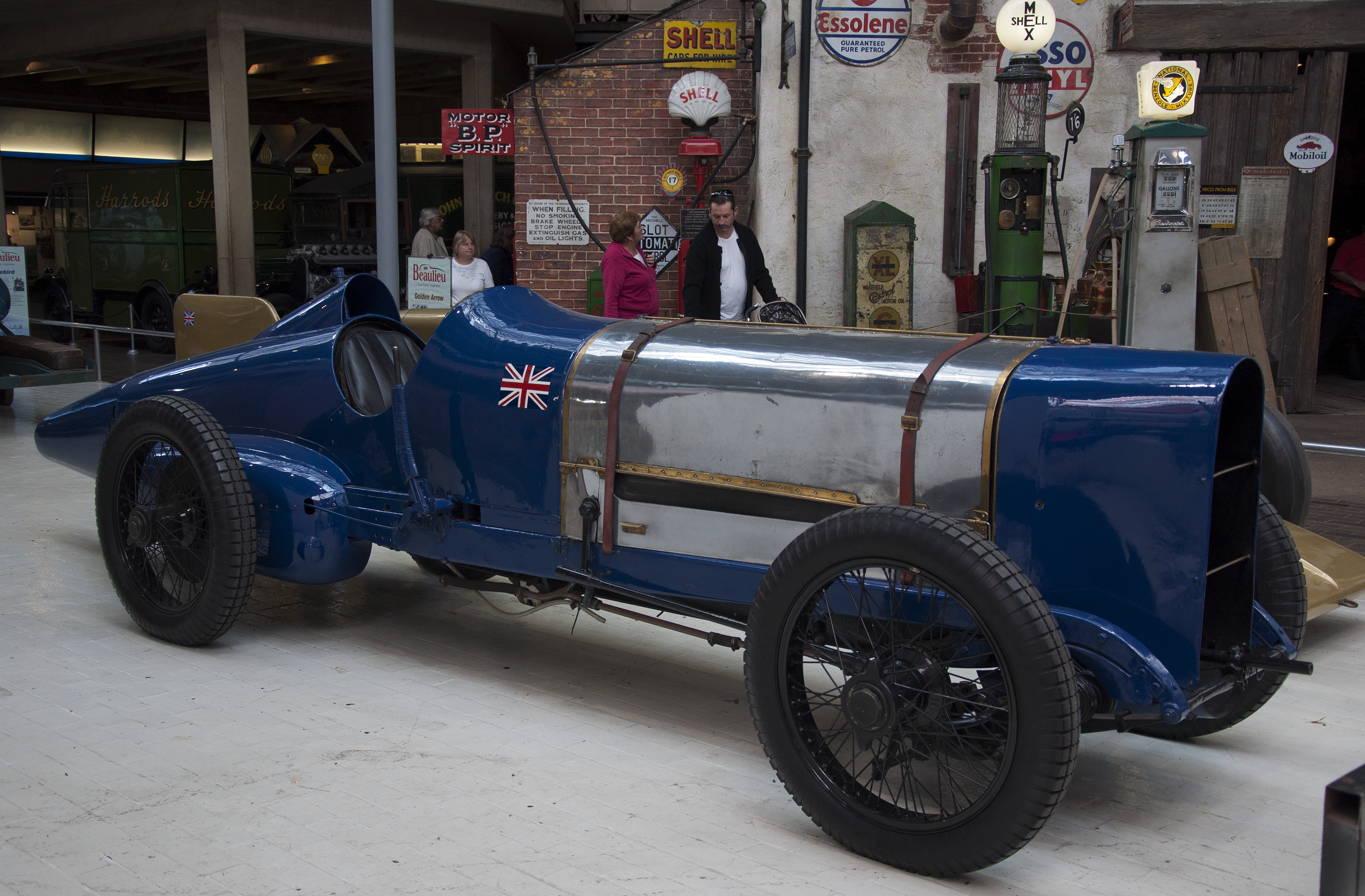
1922 Sunbeam 350HP on display at the National Motor Museum, Beaulieu

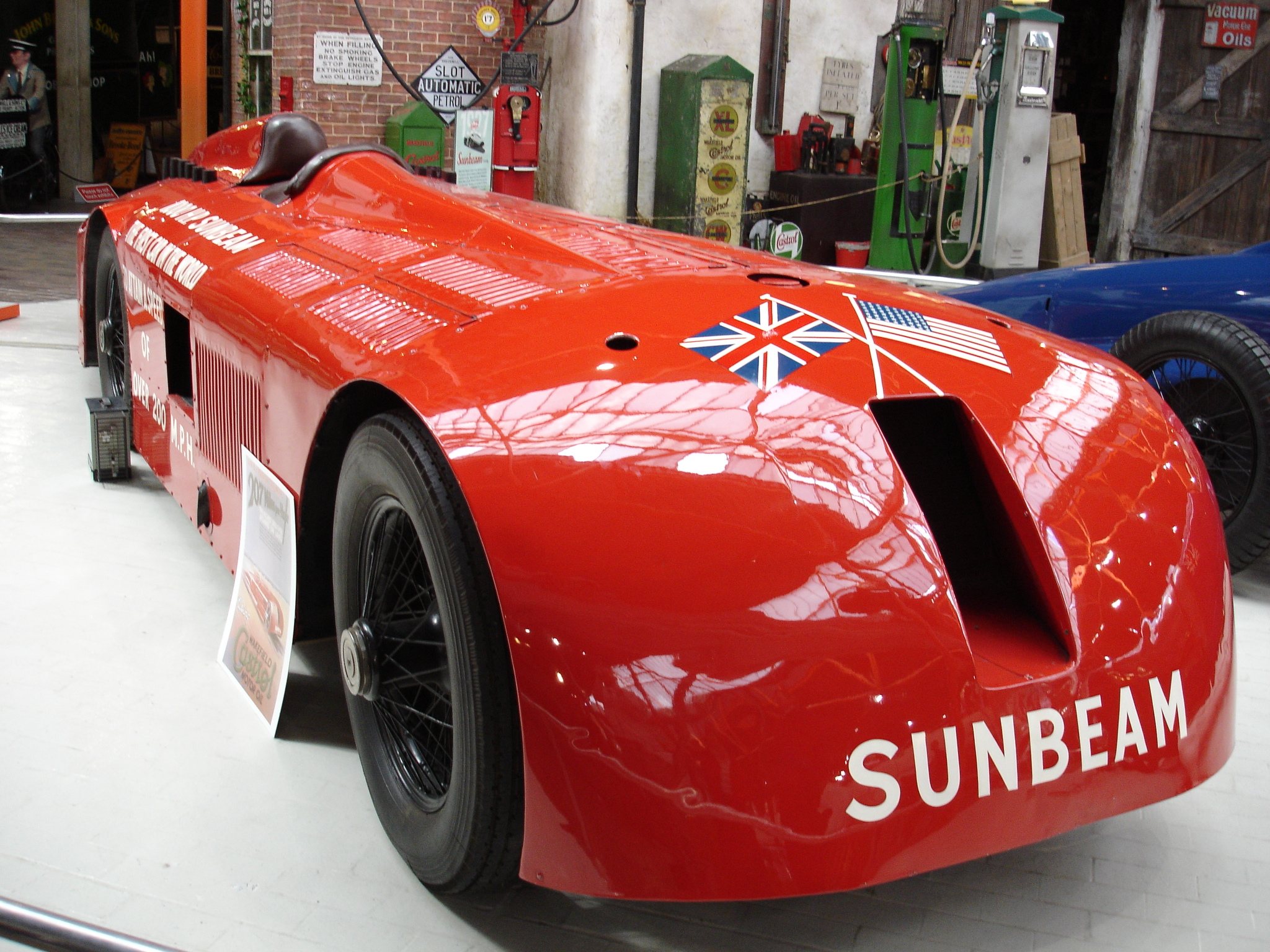
1927 Sunbeam 1000hp displayed at the National Motor Museum, Beaulieu

He also built a Brooklands racer with a purpose-built V12 18.3-litre engine whose design was a hybrid of the Sunbeam Manitou and the Sunbeam Arab aero engines. This engine had four blocks of three cylinders arranged in two banks set at 60 degrees (unlike the Arab which were set at 90 degrees). Each cylinder had one inlet and two exhaust valves actuated by a single overhead camshaft. The two camshafts were driven by a complex set of 16 gears from the front of the crankshaft – a similar arrangement to that used on the Maori engine which had two OHC per bank of cylinders. This famous car (Sunbeam 350HP) established three Land Speed Records, the first achieved by Kenelm Lee Guinness at Brooklands in 1922 with a speed of 133.75 mph. Malcolm Campbell then purchased the car, had it painted in his distinctive colour scheme, named it Blue Bird and in September 1924 achieved a new record speed of 146.16 mph at Pendine Sands in South Wales, raising it the following year to 150.76 mph. The same year Coatalen's new 3-litre Super Sports came 2nd at Le Mans, beating Bentley – this was the first production twin-cam car in the world. In 1926 Segrave captured the LSR in a new 4-litre V12 Sunbeam racer originally named Ladybird and later renamed Tiger. Coatalen decided to re-enter the LSR field himself, building the truly gigantic Sunbeam 1000HP powered by two 450 hp (340 kW) Matabele engines. On 29 March 1927 the car captured the speed record at 203.792 mph (327.971 km/h). The car is now at the National Motor Museum, Beaulieu, UK.

A later land speed record attempt, with the 1930 Silver Bullet, failed to achieve either records, or the hoped-for advances in aero engines. It is now almost forgotten.

== Legacy ==
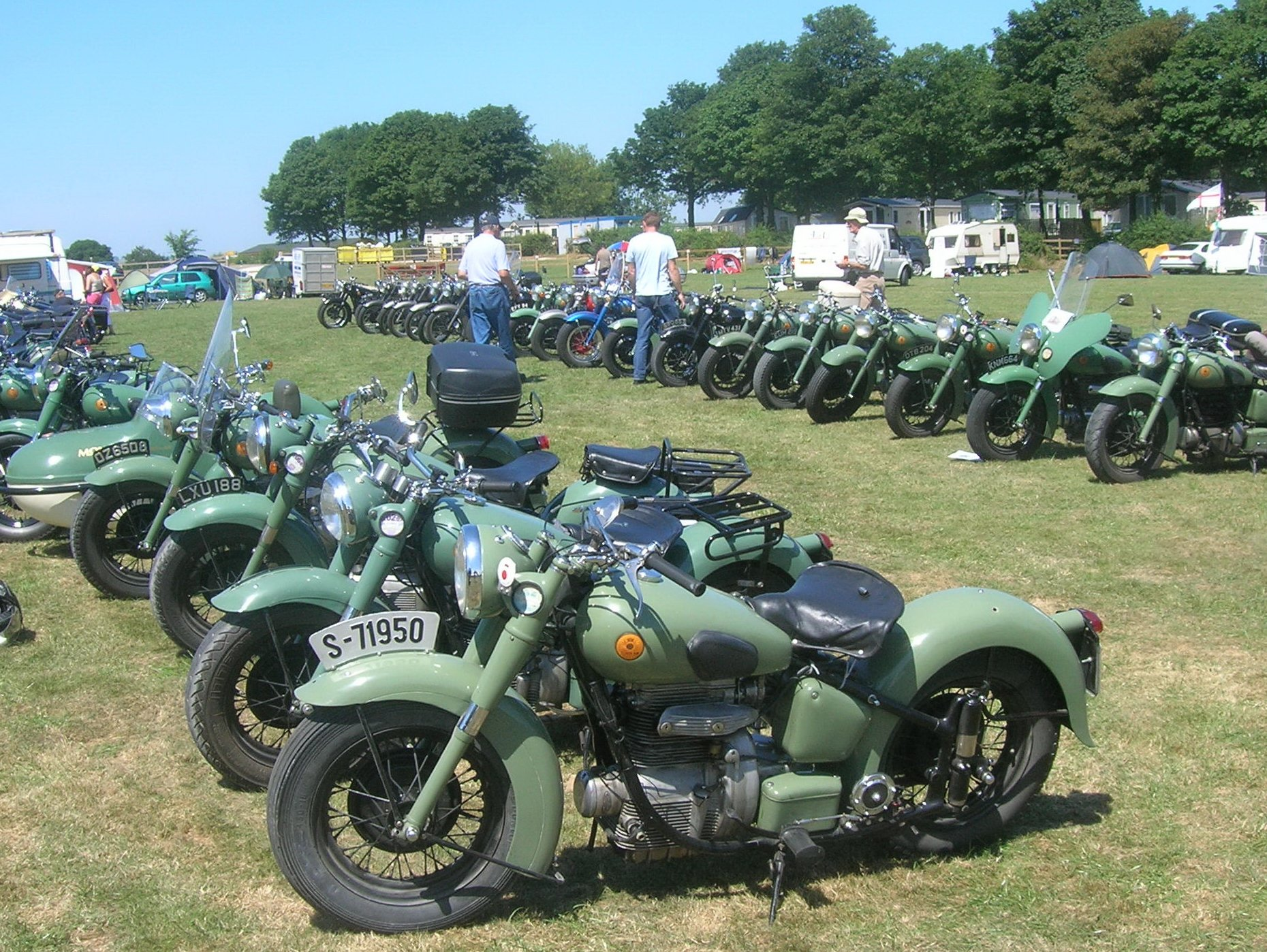
Sunbeam motorcycle Owners Rally

The name lives on in the open space known as Sunbeam Gardens near a housing estate built in the early 1990s on most of the Ladbroke Grove site of the Clément-Talbot car factory. One of the original buildings remains, the Talbot administration block now known as Ladbroke Hall, with the earl's crest high above its main entrance. In the housing area there is a Sunbeam Crescent.

== Sunbeam badged vehicles ==
=== Rootes Group ===
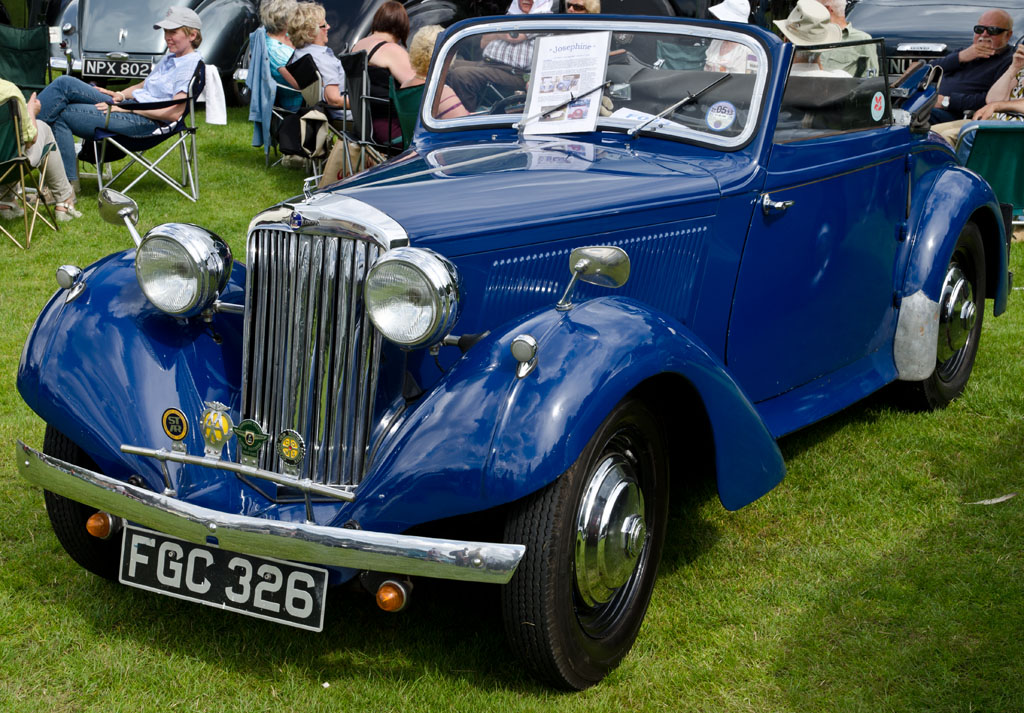
Talbot Ten drophead coupé 1938

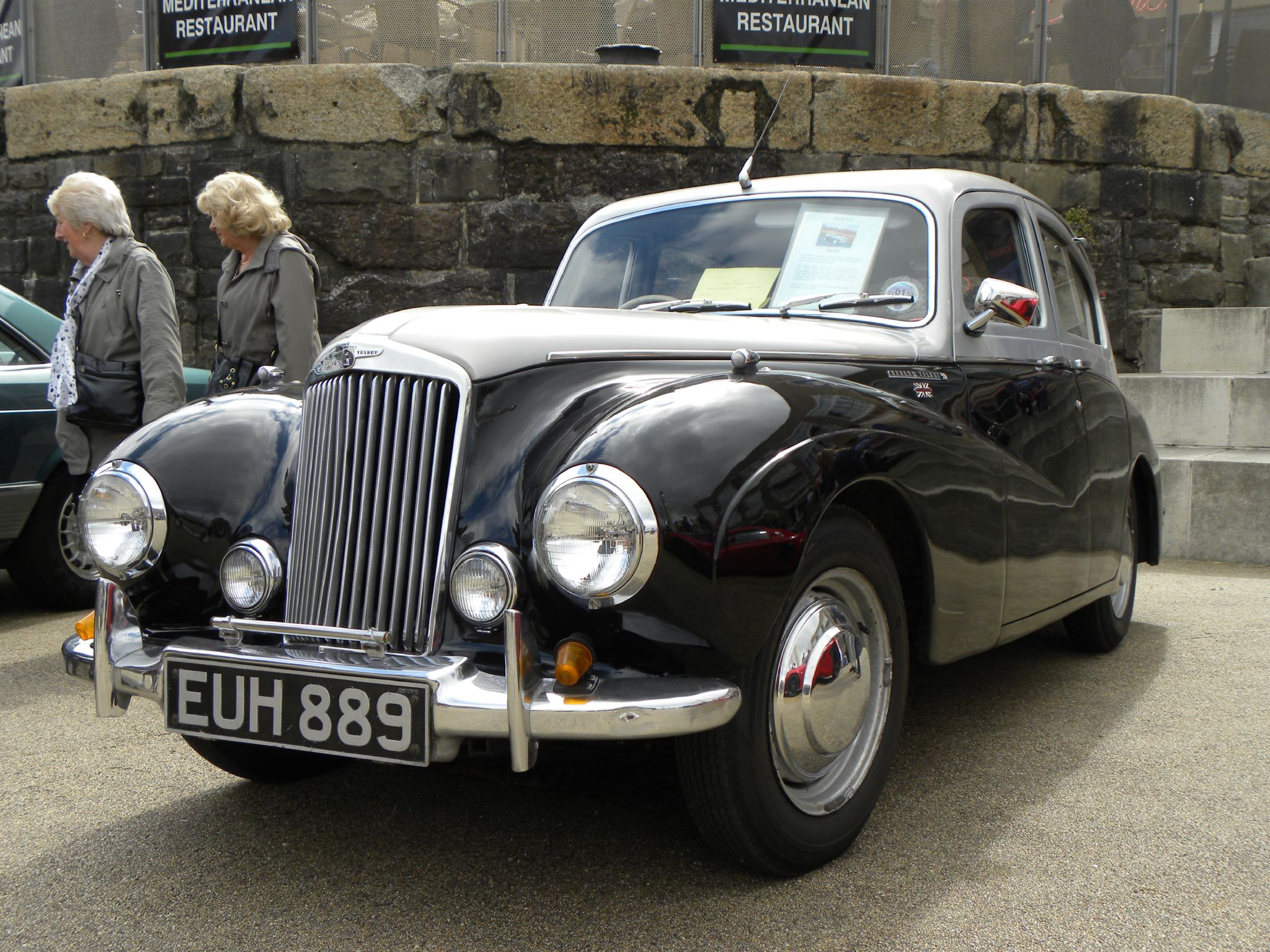
Sunbeam-Talbot 90 saloon 1949

Rootes was an early exponent of badge engineering, building a single mass-produced chassis and equipping it with different body panels and interiors to fit different markets. They ended production of existing models at all the new companies, replacing them with designs from Hillman and Humber that were more amenable to mass production.

Although Rootes' intention had been to continue the Sunbeam name on a large and expensive luxury car, the eight-cylinder Sunbeam 30. After almost four years it was announced Sunbeam Motors and Clement-Talbot were now combined under the ownership of Clement Talbot Limited – since renamed Sunbeam-Talbot Limited – and would produce good quality cars at reasonable prices. During 1937 Humber Limited bought Clement Talbot Limited and Sunbeam Motors Limited from Rootes Securities Limited.

In 1938 Rootes created a new marque called Sunbeam-Talbot which combined the quality Talbot coachwork and the current Hillman and Humber chassis and was assembled at the Talbot factory in London. The initial two models were the Sunbeam-Talbot 10 and the 3-litre followed by the Sunbeam-Talbot 2 Litre and 4-litre models based on the earlier models only with different engines and longer wheelbases. Production of these models continued after the war until 1948.

In the summer of 1948, the Sunbeam-Talbot 80 and Sunbeam-Talbot 90 were introduced, with a totally new streamlined design with flowing front fenders (wings). The 80 used the Hillman Minx-based engine with ohv and the 90 used a modified version of the Humber Hawk with ohv. The car bodies were manufactured by another Rootes Group company, British Light Steel Pressings of Acton, however the convertible drophead coupé shells were completed by Thrupp & Maberly coachbuilders in Cricklewood. The underpowered 80 was discontinued in 1950. The 90 was renamed the 90 Mark II and then the 90 Mark IIA and eventually in 1954 the Sunbeam Mark III, finally dropping the Talbot name. With the model name changes, the headlights were raised on the front fenders and an independent coil front suspension and the engine displacement went from 1944 cc to 2267 cc with a high compression head and developing 80 bhp (60 kW; 81 PS).

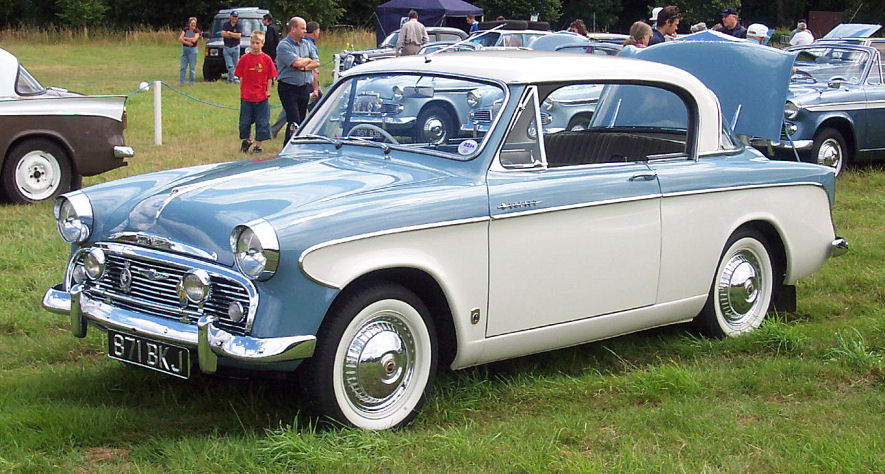
1957 Sunbeam Rapier

There was one more model of the Sunbeam-Talbot that appeared in 1953 in the form of an Alpine, a two-seater sports roadster which was initially developed by a Sunbeam-Talbot dealer George Hartwell in Bournemouth as a one-off rally car that had its beginnings as a 1952 drophead coupé. It was named supposedly by Norman Garrad, (works Competition Department) who was heavily involved in the Sunbeam-Talbot successes in the Alpine Rally in the early 1950s using the Saloon model. The Alpine Mark I and Mark III (a Mark II was never made) were hand built like the Drophead Coupé at Thrupp & Maberly coachbuilders from 1953 to 1955 when production ceased after close to 3000 were produced. It has been estimated that perhaps only 200 remain in existence today. The Talbot name was dropped in 1954 for the Sunbeam Alpine sports car, making Sunbeam the sports-performance marque. In 1955 a Sunbeam saloon won the Monte Carlo Rally. Production ceased in 1956 and was replaced by the sporty Sunbeam Rapier.

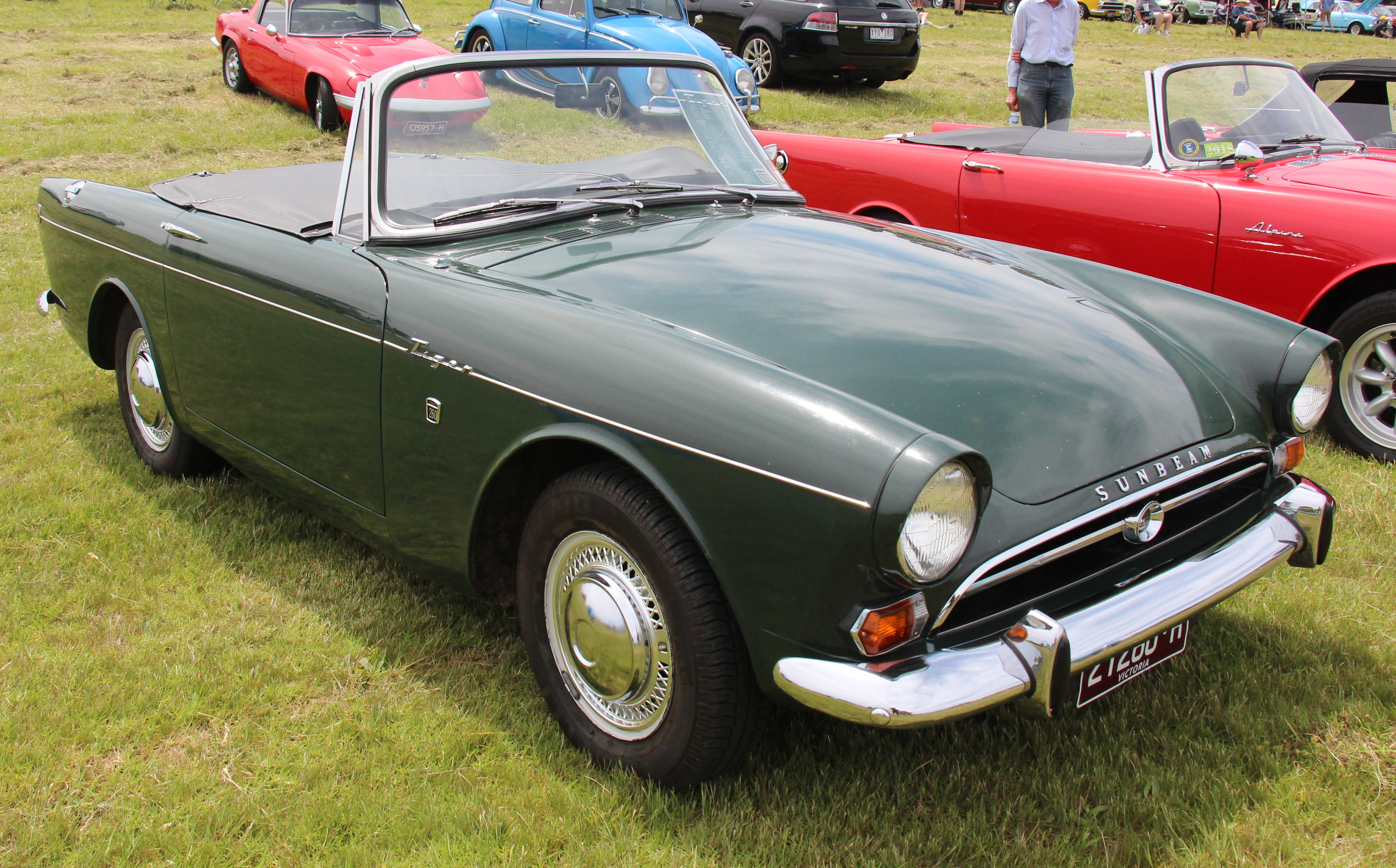
1966 Sunbeam Tiger

In 1959 a totally new Alpine was introduced, and the 1955 Rapier (essentially a badge-engineered Hillman Minx) was upgraded. After several successful series of the Alpine were released, director of US West-Coast operations, Ian Garrad, became interested in the success of the AC Cobra, which mounted a small-block V-8 engine in the small AC Ace frame to create one of the most successful sports cars of all time. Garrad became convinced the Alpine frame could also be adapted the same way, and contracted Carroll Shelby to create a prototype with a Ford engine. The result was the Sunbeam Tiger, released in 1964, which became a success. It sold 7,000 units in its three years of production compared with 70,000 over nine years for the small-engined car.

=== Chrysler Europe ===
But at this point, Rootes was in financial trouble. Talks with Leyland Motors were fruitless. In 1964, 30 percent of the company (along with 50 percent of the non-voting shares) was purchased by Chrysler, who was attempting to enter the European market. Ironically, Chrysler had purchased Simca the year earlier, who had earlier purchased Automobiles Talbot, originally the British brand that had been merged into STD Motors many years earlier.

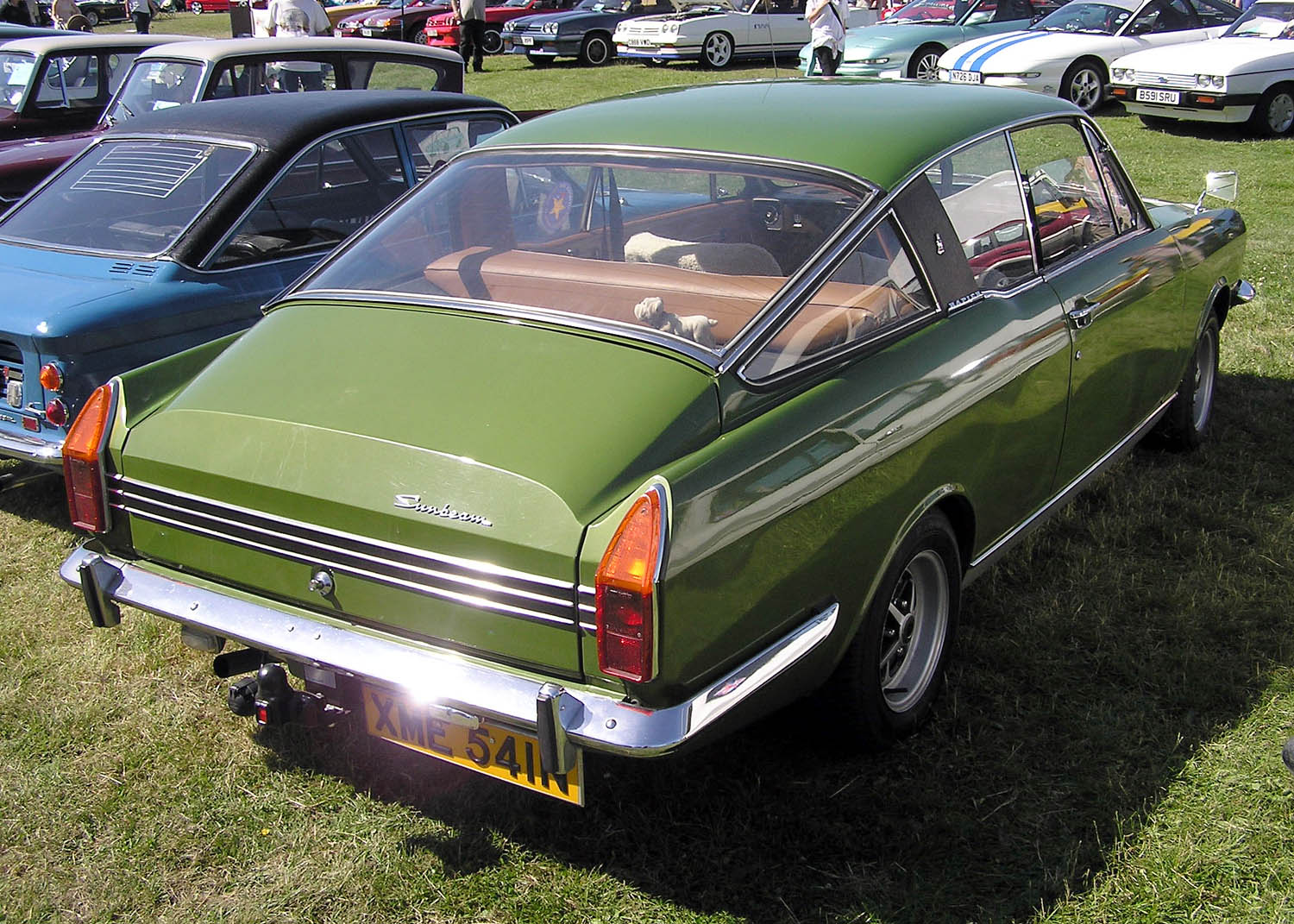
Sunbeam Rapier fastback coupé

Chrysler's experience with the Rootes empire appears to have been unhappy. Models were abandoned over the next few years while they tried to build a single brand from the best models of each of the company's components. For management, "best" typically meant "cheapest to produce," which was at odds with the former higher-quality Rootes philosophy. Brand loyalty began to erode, and was greatly damaged when they decided to drop former marques and start calling everything a Chrysler. The Tiger was dropped in 1967 after an abortive attempt to fit it with a Chrysler engine, and the Hillman Imp–derived Stiletto disappeared in 1972.

The last Sunbeam produced was the "Rootes Arrow" series Alpine/Rapier fastback (1967–76), after which Chrysler, who had purchased Rootes, disbanded the marque. The Hillman (by now Chrysler) Hunter, on which they were based, soldiered on until 1978.

A Hillman Avenger-derived hatchback, the Chrysler Sunbeam, maintained the Sunbeam name, as a model rather than a marque, from 1977. Following the takeover of Chrysler Europe by PSA Group, the model was branded as the Talbot Sunbeam from 1979 through to its discontinuation in 1981. The Sunbeam name has not been used on a production car since then.

=== Factory locations and models produced ===
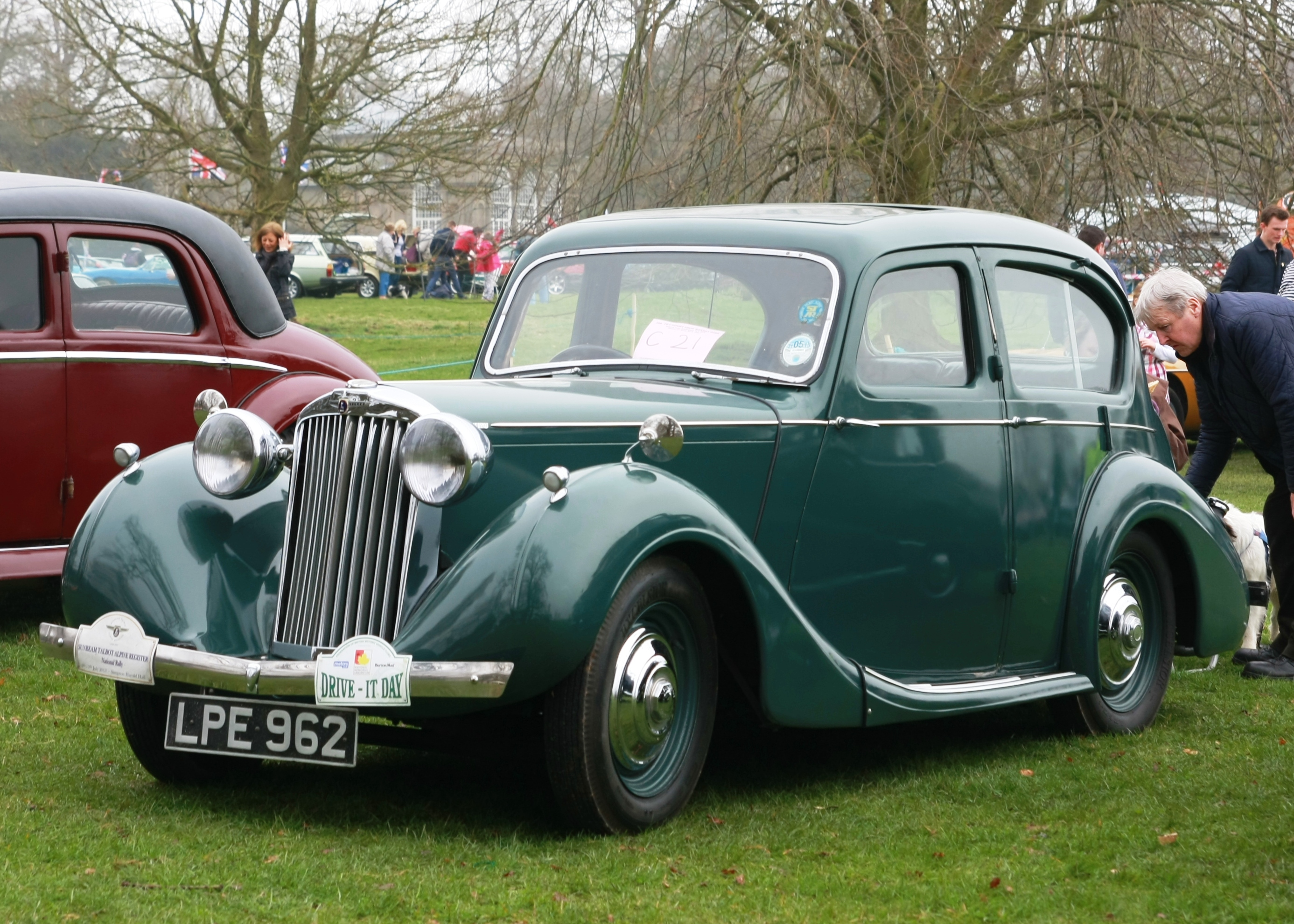
1947 Sunbeam-Talbot Ten

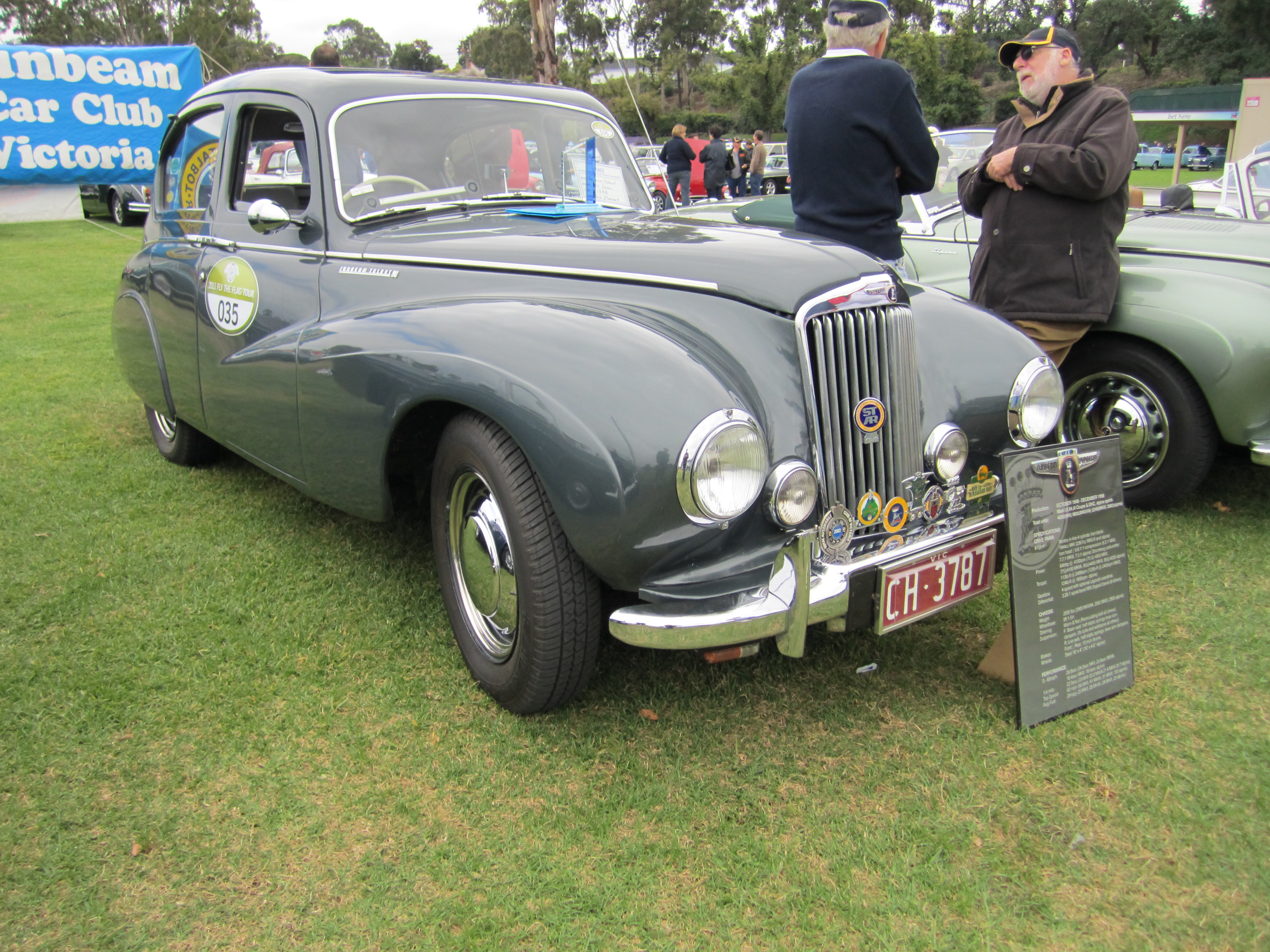
c. 1950 Sunbeam-Talbot 80

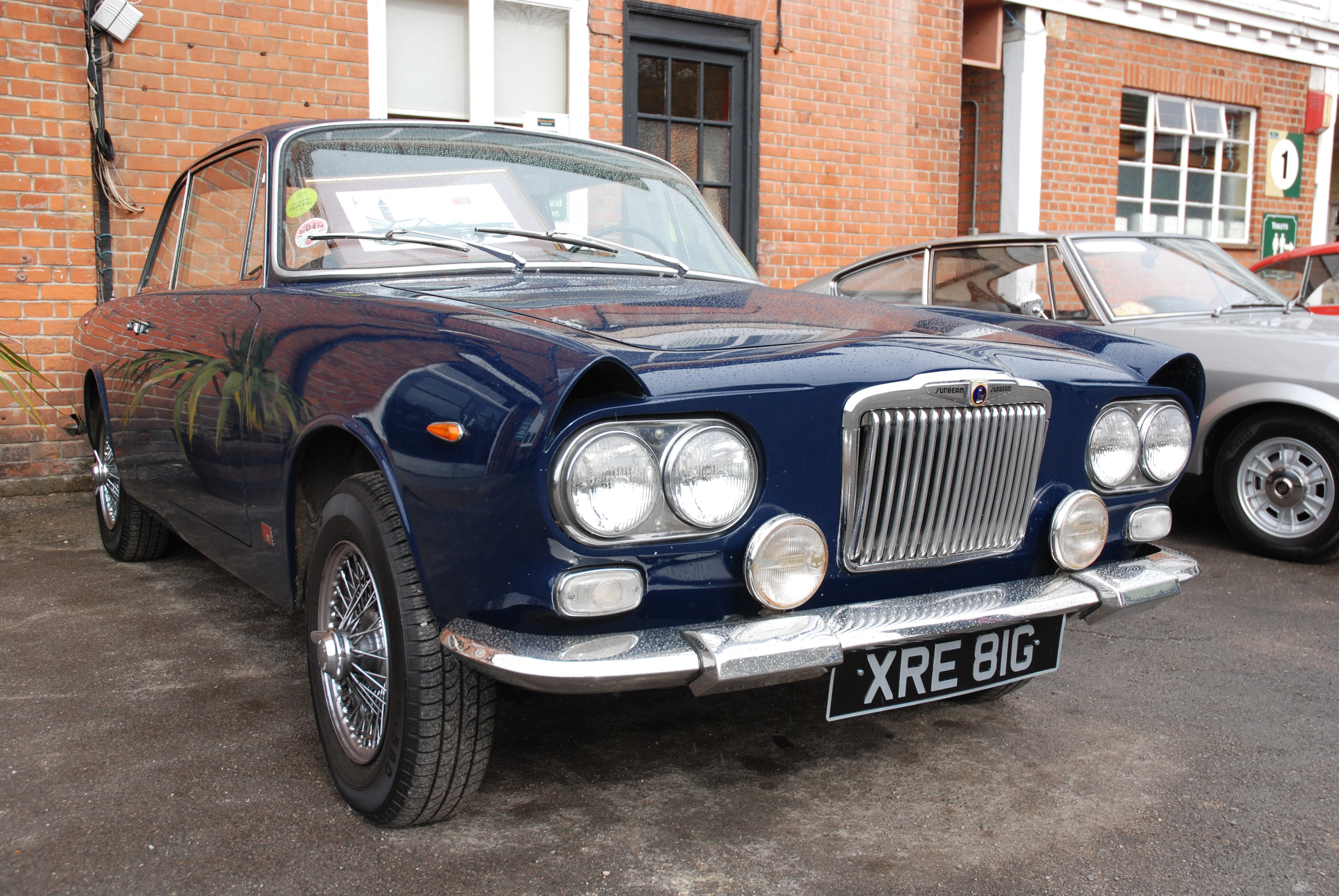
Venezia body by Touring

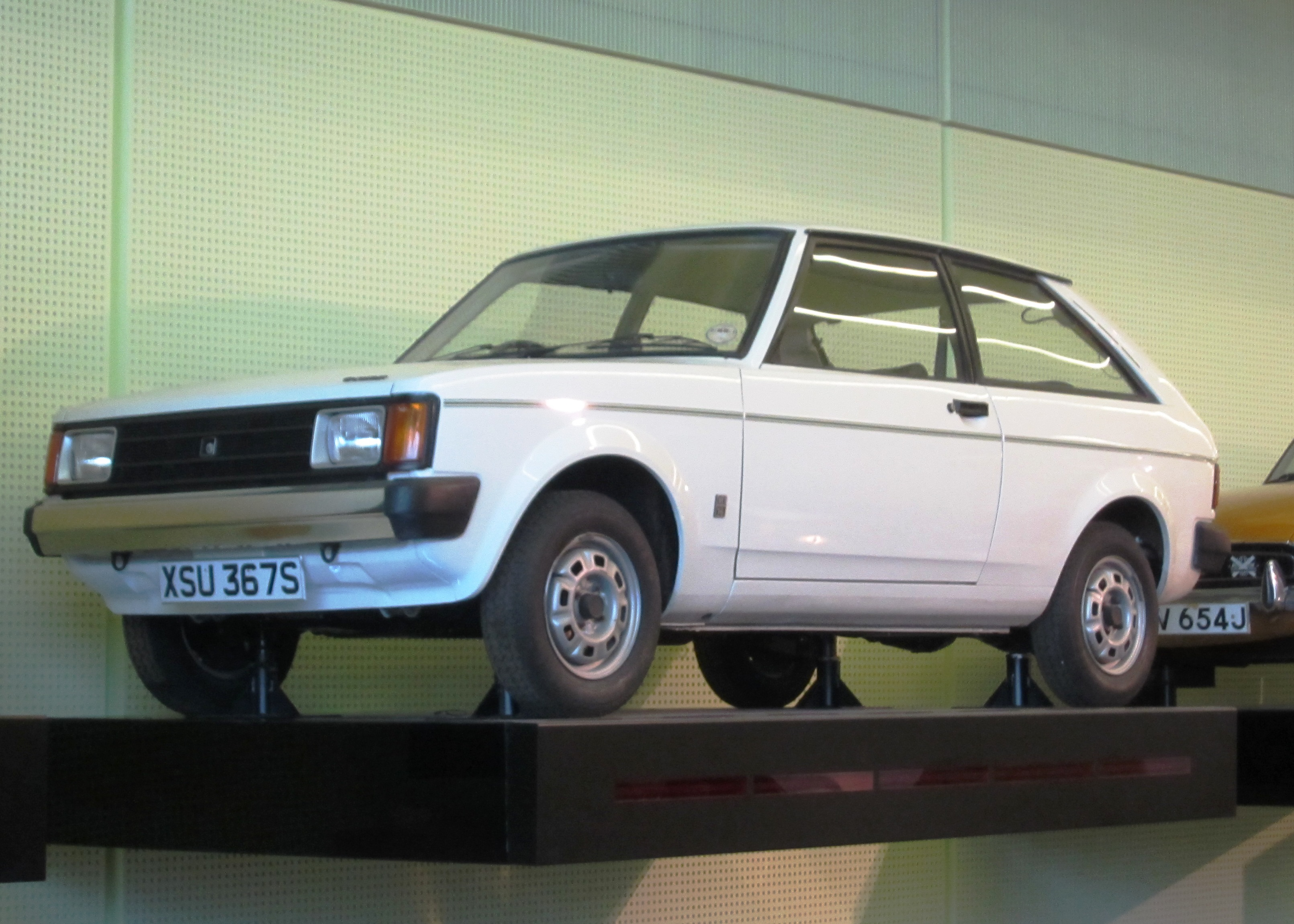
Chrysler Sunbeam

==== Barlby Road Kensington London ====
- 1936–1937 Sunbeam 30 prototypes
- 1936–1938 Talbot Ten
- 1938–1946 Sunbeam-Talbot Ten
- 1939–1946 Sunbeam-Talbot Two Litre
- 1938–1940 Sunbeam-Talbot Three Litre
- 1939–1940 Sunbeam-Talbot Four Litre

==== Ryton-on-Dunsmore ====
Sunbeam-Talbot

- 1946–1948 Sunbeam-Talbot Ten
- 1946–1948 Sunbeam-Talbot Two Litre
- 1948–1950 Sunbeam-Talbot 80
- 1948–1954 Sunbeam-Talbot 90 Marks I, II & IIA
- 1954–1957 Sunbeam 90 Mark III

Sunbeam

- 1953–1955 Sunbeam Alpine Mark I, III
- 1955–1967 Sunbeam Rapier Series I, II, III, IIIA, IV & V
- 1959–1968 Sunbeam Alpine Series I, II, III, III, IV & V
- 1964–1967 Sunbeam Tiger
- 1967–1970 Sunbeam Rapier Fastback & Sunbeam Alpine Fastback

===== Ryton-on-Dunsmore export-only =====
- Sunbeam Minx
- Sunbeam Vogue/Sunbeam Arrow
- Sunbeam Funwagon/Sunbeam Highwayman

==== Linwood ====
- 1966–1976 Sunbeam Imp Sport
- 1967–1972 Sunbeam Stiletto
- 1970–1976 Sunbeam Rapier Fastback & Sunbeam Alpine Fastback
- 1977–1979 Chrysler Sunbeam (model name only)
- 1979–1981 Talbot Sunbeam (model name only)

==== Stoke ====
- 1982–1982 Sunbeam Lotus-Horizon (One-off prototype rally car)

==== Milan, Italy ====
- 1963–1964 Sunbeam Venezia body by Carrozzeria Touring: only 145 produced

== In popular culture ==
- P. G. Wodehouse in Carry on, Jeeves (1922) wrote "...A Sunbeam, isn't it? We've got a Wolseley at home."
- Agatha Christie's character, Horace Blatt, drives a Sunbeam, the only automobile make mentioned in Evil under the Sun (1941).
- Grace Kelly's character drives a metallic blue 1953 Sunbeam Alpine Mk I in To Catch a Thief (1955).
- Elizabeth Taylor's character drives a red Series I Sunbeam Alpine in BUtterfield 8 (1960).
- James Bond drives a lake blue Series II Sunbeam Alpine in Dr. No (1962).
- Michael Caine's character drives a Sunbeam Alpine in Gambit (1966). Caine is also rescued by a woman in a white 1968 Alpine roadster in Get Carter (1971).
- Tuesday Weld's character drives a powder blue 1967 Sunbeam Alpine in Pretty Poison (1968).
- Maxwell Smart drove a Sunbeam Tiger in Get Smart.
- Nancy Drew inherited a Sunbeam Tiger in Nancy Drew (2019 TV series).

== See also ==
- List of car manufacturers of the United Kingdom
- Sunbeam S7 and S8
- Sunbeamland
