= Sopwith Antelope =

Antelope

General information
- Type: Light transport aircraft
- National origin: United Kingdom
- Manufacturer: Sopwith Aviation Company
- Number built: 1

History
- First flight: 1920
- Retired: 1935
- Developed from: Sopwith Wallaby

The Sopwith Antelope was a British three-seat transport aircraft built after the end of the First World War. A single-engined biplane based on the Sopwith Wallaby long-range aircraft, only a single Antelope was built.

== Development and design ==
In 1919, the Sopwith Aviation Company developed a three-seat transport aircraft, the Sopwith Antelope, based on its Wallaby long-range aircraft built to compete for a £10,000 prize for an England-Australia flight, which was in turn based on the Sopwith Atlantic, which had crashed during an attempt to be the first aircraft cross the Atlantic Ocean non-stop earlier that year.

Like the Wallaby, the Antelope was a single-engined tractor biplane, but with a modified fuselage to accommodate the pilot and two passengers. The pilot sat in an open cockpit under the tailing edge of the wing, in front of an enclosed cabin where the two passengers sat on wicker seats facing each other, with a door on the left side of the cabin to give direct access and windows to provide the passengers with a view. The cabin was fitted with a hatch on its roof, which when slid forward allowed the rearmost passenger seat to be raised so the passenger could be seated with his or her head outside the cabin. It was powered by a single 180 hp (134 kW) Wolseley Viper water-cooled V8 engine and had two-bay wings.

== Operational history ==
The Antelope was displayed at the 1920 Olympia Aero show, and received its Certificate of Airworthiness on 10 August 1920 before being entered into the Air Ministry Small Commercial Aircraft Competition later that month, where it received the second prize of £3,000.

While Sopwith went into Voluntary liquidation, the Antelope was sold to the Larkin Sopwith Aviation Company of Australia in 1923, being fitted with a Siddeley Puma engine, where it was used to fly air mail, remaining in existence until 1935.

== Specifications ==
Data from Sopwith – The Man and His Aircraft

General characteristics

- Crew: 1
- Capacity: 2 passengers
- Length: 31 ft 0 in (9.45 m)
- Wingspan: 46 ft 6 in (14.17 m)
- Height: 11 ft 3 in (3.43 m)
- Wing area: 550 sq ft (51 m^{2})
- Empty weight: 2,387 lb (1,083 kg)
- Gross weight: 3,450 lb (1,565 kg)
- Powerplant: 1 × Wolseley Viper water-cooled V8 engine, 180 hp (130 kW)
- Propellers: 2-bladed propeller

Performance

- Maximum speed: 110 mph (180 km/h, 96 kn)
- Cruise speed: 84 mph (135 km/h, 73 kn)
- Range: 450 mi (720 km, 390 nmi) (approximately)
- Time to altitude: 7.5 min to 5,000 ft (1,500 m)

== See also ==
Related development

- Sopwith Atlantic
- Sopwith Wallaby

Aircraft of comparable role, configuration, and era

- Avro 547
- Beardmore W.B.X
- Westland Limousine
