= Sunbeam Arab =

1910s British piston aircraft engine

Arab
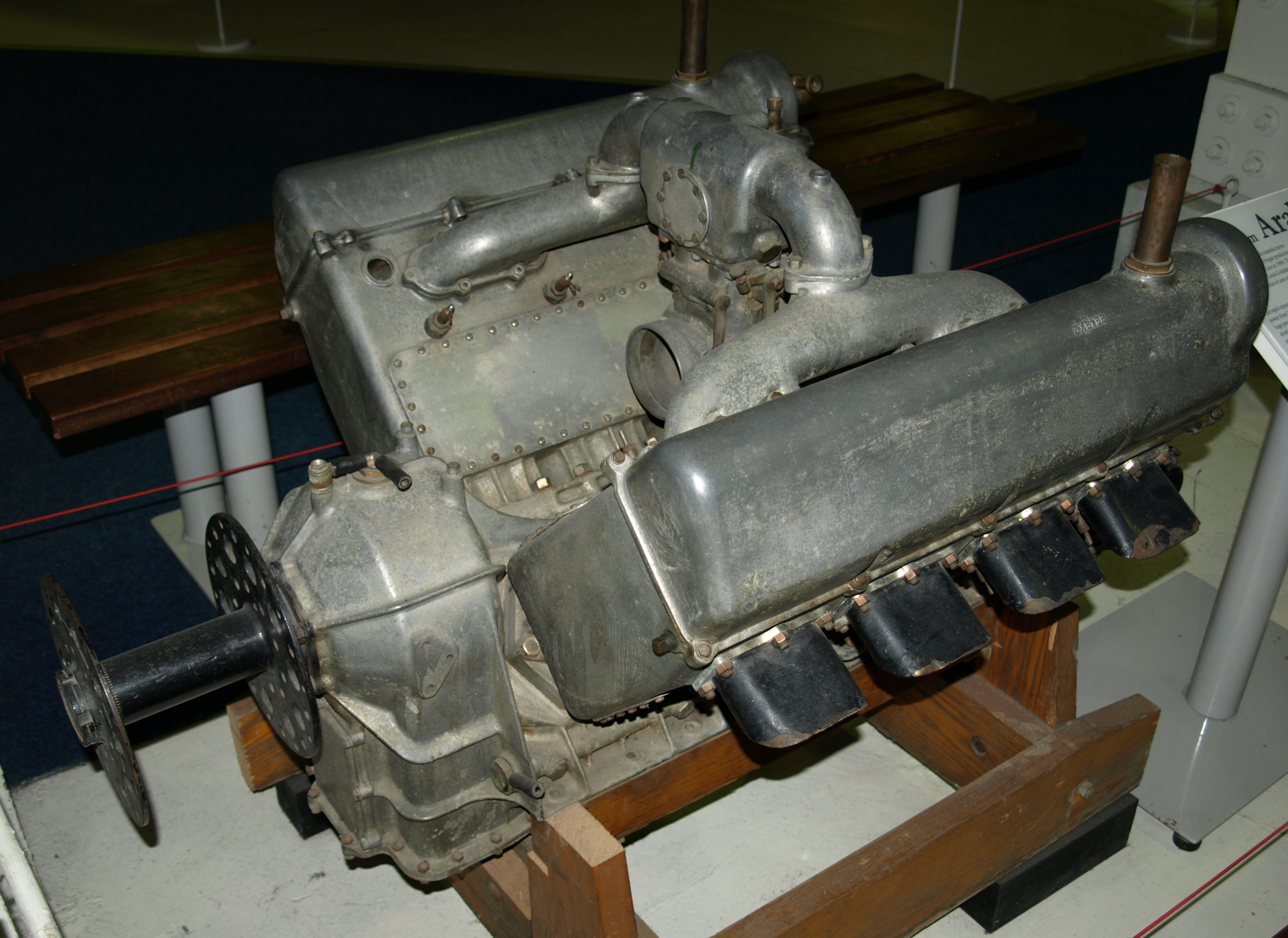
- Preserved Sunbeam Arab
- Type: V8, 90 degree, water-cooled, piston engine
- National origin: Britain
- Manufacturer: Sunbeam
- Designer: Louis Coatalen
- First run: 1916
- Major applications: Bristol F.2 Fighter, Bristol Scout F
- Manufactured: 1917–1918
- Number built: 6,110 ordered 1,311 built
- Variants: Sunbeam Dyak; Sunbeam Pathan

The Sunbeam Arab was a British First World War-era aero engine.

== Design and development ==
By 1916 the demand for aero-engines was placing huge demands on manufacturing. To help ease the pressure, the War Office standardised on engines of about 200 hp (149 kW); one of these was a V8 water-cooled engine from Sunbeam known as the Arab. Using cast aluminium alloy cylinder blocks and heads with die-cast aluminium alloy pistons, the Arab had a bore of 4.72 in (120 mm) and stroke of 5.12 in (130 mm) for a capacity of 717.76 cu in (11.762 L), developing 208–212 hp (155–158 kW) at 2,000 rpm.

First bench-run in 1916, the Arab was obviously inspired by the Hispano-Suiza V8 engines but with very little in common when examined in detail. After submission to the Internal Combustion Engine Committee of the Advisory Committee on Aeronautics Sunbeam received an order for 1,000 in March 1917. The order formed part of the strategy of Sir William Weir to bypass the skilled engineering workforce needed to build Rolls-Royce Eagle and Falcon engines, through the use of cast aluminium cylinder blocks that minimised the need for machining. However, the Arab was ordered before flight testing, and when the engine went into the air, chronic vibration problems emerged which were never cured. The initial order was increased to 2,000 in June 1917 as well as another 2,160 to be built by Austin Motors (1,000), Lanchester Motor Company (300), Napier & Son (300), and Willys Overland (560) in the United States of America. Despite this massive manufacturing effort, the Arab proved largely useless, and nearly half of the production run of the Bristol Fighter, Britain’s best two-seat fighter of the First World War, went into storage because plans to power the aircraft with the Arab were abandoned due to the engine’s failings.

Service use of the Arab was limited because of poor reliability and persistent vibration problems, causing some 2,350 orders to be cancelled and remaining orders 'settled', compensating manufacturers for costs incurred.

Developed from the Arab were the inverted V8 Sunbeam Bedouin, straight-six Sunbeam Dyak, W-12 Sunbeam Kaffir, and 20-cylinder radial Sunbeam Malay.

== Variants ==
Arab
The production engine loosely based on the Hispano-Suiza 8 V8 engines.
Bedouin
In common with many other contemporary engine manufacturers, the Arab was redesigned to run inverted and given the name Sunbeam Bedouin. Intended to provide better forward visibility for single-engined aircraft, there is no evidence that the Bedouin was fitted to an aircraft or flew.
Kaffir
A W-12 broad-arrow engine using blocks, heads and valve-gear from the Arab, giving 300 hp (224 kW). Bore remained the same at 120 mm (4.72 in), but with a stroke of 135 mm (5.31 in).
Dyak
A straight-six extrapolation of the Arab retaining the 120 mm (4.72 in) stroke and 130 mm (5.12 in) bore of the Arab, but with only two valves per cylinder as opposed to the three valves on the Arab.
Pathan
Coatalen expressed his interest in diesel engines by designing a diesel derivative of the Dyak with the same attributes, developing 100 hp (75 kW) at 1,500 rpm. Only prototypes of the Pathan were built.
Malay
The Sunbeam Malay was a 20-cylinder radial aircraft engine of 29.4 L (1,794 cu in) capacity manufactured by Sunbeam using five four-cylinder blocks from the Arab arranged around a central crankshaft. The Malay retained the 120 mm (4.72 in) × 130 mm (5.12 in) bore and stroke of the Arab, as well as the three valves per cylinder and overhead camshafts. Nominally rated at 500 hp (373 kW), the Malay was not put into production.

== Applications ==
Data from Brew.

- Armstrong-Whitworth F.K.10
- Avro 530
- Bristol F.2b Fighter
- Bristol Scout F
- Fairey F.2a
- Fairey N.2a
- Grain Griffin
- Martinsyde F.2
- Norman Thompson N.2c
- Norman Thompson NT.2b
- Royal Aircraft Factory AE.3 Ram
- Royal Aircraft Factory SE.5a
- Sage 4B Seaplane Trainer
- Short Improved Navyplane
- Sopwith Cuckoo
- Sunbeam 1917 Bomber
- Supermarine Baby

== Specifications (Arab I) ==
Data from Sunbeam Aero-Engines.

=== General characteristics ===
- Type: 8-cylinder, upright, 90 degree Vee engine
- Bore: 4.72 in (120 mm)
- Stroke: 5.12 in (130 mm)
- Displacement: 717.77 cu in (11.76 L)
- Length: 43.5 in (1,100 mm)
- Width: 31.9 in (810 mm)
- Height: 35.5 in (900 mm)
- Dry weight: 530 lb (240 kg)

=== Components ===
- Valvetrain: SOHC, three poppet valves per cylinder (one inlet, two exhaust)
- Fuel system: Single Claudel-Hobson carburettor
- Cooling system: Liquid-cooled
- Reduction gear: 0.6:1, Left-hand tractor/Right Hand pusher

=== Performance ===
- Power output: 208 hp (155 kW) at 2,000 rpm (takeoff power)
- Compression ratio: 5.3:1

== See also ==
Comparable engines

- Hispano-Suiza 8
- Wolseley Viper

Related lists

- List of aircraft engines
