= Avro 552 =

1920s British light biplane aircraft

552
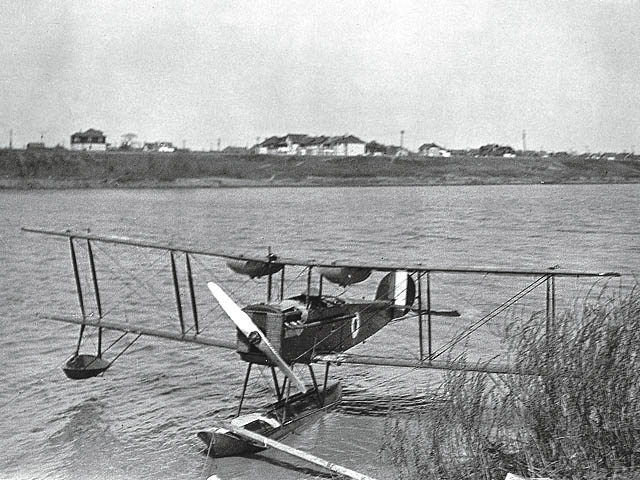

General information
- Type: Civil utility aircraft
- Manufacturer: Avro; Canadian Vickers (under licence)
- Primary users: Argentine Navy Royal Canadian Air Force
- Number built: 33

History
- First flight: 16 July 1921

The Avro 552 was a British light biplane aircraft produced in the early 1920s. It was another attempt by Avro to sell a derivative of the wartime 504 to the civil market.

== Design and development ==
In this case, the company took advantage of the large number of war-surplus Wolseley Viper engines left over from Royal Aircraft Factory S.E.5a production. In 1921, one of these was married to a standard 504K airframe for evaluation under the designation Avro 551. Trials proved encouraging, but an extra fuel tank was installed in the upper wing as a result of the Viper's higher rate of fuel consumption, and changes were also made to the aileron design.

This configuration went into production as the 552, with the Argentine Navy purchasing 12 examples of a float-equipped version, the 552A, which served as trainers until 1927. Two similar machines were purchased by Bulgaria.

In 1924, the Royal Canadian Air Force arranged for Canadian Vickers to purchase a licence to produce five landplanes and nine seaplane examples for use in forestry patrol. These differed from British-built aircraft by the use of U.S. Naval Aircraft Factory floats, and increased fuel tankage for extended range. One of the license-built seaplanes was fitted with a Wright engine and known in Canadian service as the Avro Wright. Licensed production was also undertaken by C.B. Field of Kingswood Knoll, Surrey, who built three aircraft from surplus components supplied by Avro. These were flown as banner tugs by Inca Aviation until 1935.

The fuselage of the 552 prototype, G-EAPR was later used as the basis for the Cierva C.8 autogyro, but was eventually converted back to the winged configuration by a private owner when disposed of by the company.

== Operators ==
Argentina

- Argentine Naval Aviation

Bulgaria

- Bulgarian Air Force and naval aviation

Canada

- Royal Canadian Air Force

== Specifications (552) ==
General characteristics

- Crew: one pilot
- Capacity: one passenger or instructor
- Length: 28 ft 0 in (8.54 m)
- Wingspan: 36 ft 0 in (10.98 m)
- Height: 10 ft 5 in (3.18 m)
- Wing area: 330 sq ft (30.7 m^{2})
- Gross weight: 2,260 lb (1,025 kg)
- Powerplant: 1 × Wolseley Viper , 180 hp (134 kW)

== Bibliography ==
- Anderson, Lennart (November–December 2019). "La renaissance de l'aviation militair bulgare dans les années vingt" [The Rebirth of Bulgarian Military Aviation in the Twenties]. Avions (in French) (232): 52–66. ISSN 1243-8650.
- Taylor, Michael J. H. (1989). Jane's Encyclopedia of Aviation. London: Studio Editions. p. 93.
