= Sage Type 4 =

Prototype floatplane of the First World War

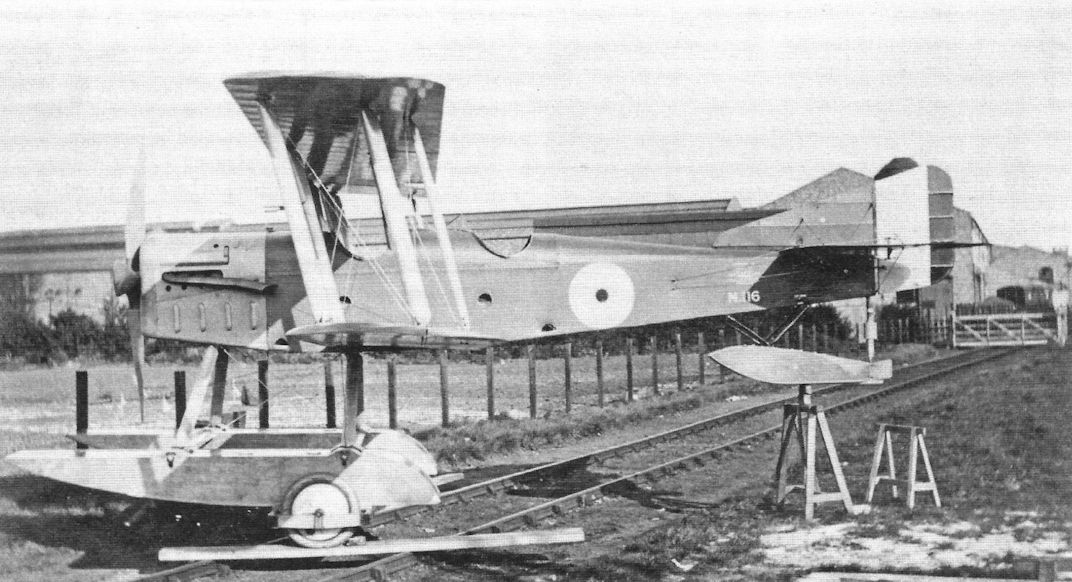

General information
- Type: Floatplane
- National origin: United Kingdom
- Manufacturer: Frederick Sage & Company
- Number built: 2

History
- First flight: 3 July 1917
- Developed from: Sage Type 3

The Sage Type 4 was a prototype British floatplane of the First World War. It was a designed as a two-seat reconnaissance aircraft for the Royal Naval Air Service, but was chosen for service as a floatplane trainer, although the end of the war resulted in production being cancelled.

== Design and development ==
In early 1917, the Peterborough based woodworking company of Frederick Sage & Company designed a two-seat patrol floatplane for the Royal Naval Air Service based on Sage's Type 3 landplane trainer. Like the Type 3, the new design, the Sage Type 4, was a single-engined biplane. Pilot and observer sat in separate tandem cockpits, with the pilot occupying the front cockpit, while the wireless operator/observer sat in the rear cockpit, with both crew members having good visibility. The aircraft was powered by a single 150 hp (112 kW) Hispano-Suiza 8 water-cooled V-8 engine in the nose driving a tractor propeller. Undercarriage consisted of two main floats under the wing the a further tail float.

The prototype Sage Type 4a (serial number N.116) first flew on 3 July 1917. The type demonstrated excellent handing during testing, being capable both of flying aerobatic manoeuvres while still being stable enough to be easily flown "hands-off". Despite this, the type was rejected for service as a patrol aircraft, but it was recommended that it instead be adapted into a float-plane trainer. The aircraft was fitted with dual controls and the engine mounting was modified to allow any one of a variety of 200 hp (149 kW) engines to be fitted. N.116 was converted to the new standard, being fitted with a Sunbeam Arab and flew as the Sage Type 4b on 17 May 1918.

Sage also designed a revised version, the Sage Type 4c with folding wings of increased wingspan (39 ft 7 1/4 in (12.07 m) compared with 34 ft 6 in (10.52 m) for the earlier aircraft and powered by a 200 hp Hispano Suiza engine, with a prototype flying on 12 October 1918.

Both the Type 4b and 4c were adopted as standard training floatplanes for the RNAS, but the end of the First World War resulted in production plans being abandoned. (Note: Some sources indicate that an order for 29 Sage Type 4s was cancelled in October 1918 to pay for Norman Thompson N.T.2B flying boat trainers.)

== Variants ==
Type 4a
Two-seat patrol seaplane, powered by 150 hp (110 kW) Hispano-Suiza 8A engine. One prototype built. Converted to Type 4b.
Type 4b
Two seat floatplane trainer, powered by 200 hp (150 kW) Sunbeam Arab engine. Converted from Type 4a.
Type 4c
Revised floatplane trainer with folding wings. Powered by 200 hp (150 kW) Hispano-Suiza 8B engine. One example built.

== Specifications (Sage 4c) ==
Data from British Aeroplanes 1914–18

General characteristics

- Crew: 2
- Length: 37 ft 6 in (11.43 m)
- Wingspan: 39 ft 7.25 in (12.0714 m)
- Height: 11 ft 7 in (3.53 m)
- Wing area: 386 sq ft (35.9 m^{2})
- Empty weight: 2,215 lb (1,005 kg)
- Gross weight: 2,875 lb (1,304 kg)
- Fuel capacity: 35 1/2 imp gal (42.6 US gal; 161 L)
- Powerplant: 1 × Hispano-Suiza 8B water cooled V8 engine, 200 hp (150 kW)
- Propellers: single blade two bladed propeller, 9 ft (2.7 m) diameter

Performance

- Maximum speed: 97.2 mph (156.4 km/h, 84.5 kn) at 3,000 ft (910 m)
- Stall speed: 45 mph (72 km/h, 39 kn) (landing speed)
- Endurance: 2 h 30 min
- Service ceiling: 13,700 ft (4,200 m)
- Time to altitude:
  - 8 min to 5,000 ft (1,520 m)
  - 21 min 20 s to 10,000 ft (3,050 m)

== See also ==
Related development

- Sage Type 3

Related lists

- List of flying boats and floatplanes
