= Sage Type 3 =

Failed British biplane aircraft prototype

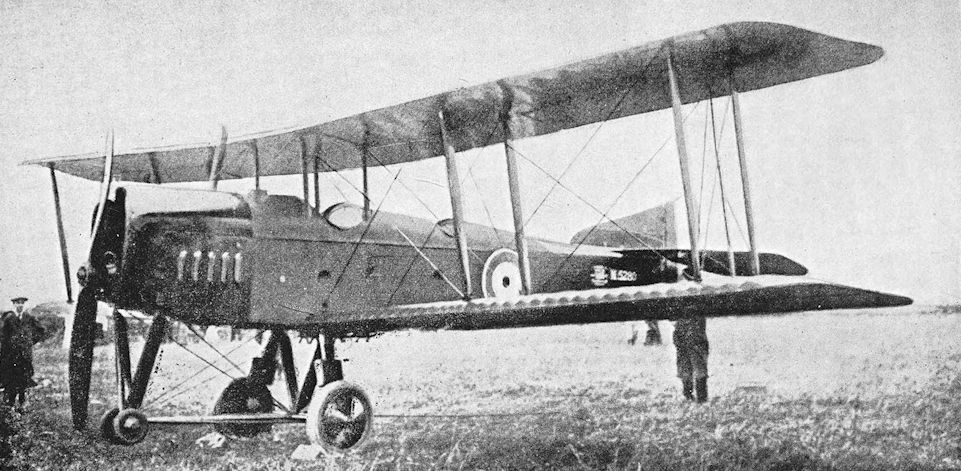

General information
- Type: Trainer aircraft
- National origin: United Kingdom
- Manufacturer: Frederic Sage & Co. Limited
- Number built: 2

History
- First flight: 5 January 1917

The Sage Type 3 (also known as the Sage N3 School) was a prototype British biplane training aircraft of the First World War. It was unsuccessful, only two examples being built.

== Development and design ==
In 1916, the British Admiralty placed a contract with Frederick Sage & Co, a Peterborough-based woodworking company which had become an aircraft contractor for the Royal Navy, to design and build a primary trainer for the Royal Naval Air Service. It was required to be robust, with a low landing speed and good visibility. The resultant design, the Sage Type 3, was a two-bay tractor biplane powered by a Rolls-Royce Hawk engine. In order to prevent the aircraft overturning during landing, it was fitted with an additional pair of wheels ahead of the mainwheels.

The first prototype Type 3 flew on 5 January 1917. It proved to be slow, even for a trainer, and was modified with smaller tail surfaces and reduced weight, becoming the Type 3b (with the original design retrospectively designated Type 3a), which slightly improved performance. However, after a second aircraft was built, the contract was cancelled, and the remaining aircraft of the contract for 30 Type 3s were unbuilt. The type did form the basis for the Sage Type 4 floatplane, which was ordered into production but cancelled due to the end of the war.

== Specifications (Type 3b) ==
Data from British Aeroplanes 1914-18

General characteristics

- Crew: 2
- Length: 32 ft 10 in (10.01 m)
- Wingspan: 34 ft 6 in (10.52 m)
- Height: 10 ft 9 in (3.28 m)
- Wing area: 330 sq ft (31 m^{2})
- Empty weight: 1,390 lb (630 kg)
- Gross weight: 1,980 lb (898 kg)
- Fuel capacity: 26 imp gal (31 US gal; 120 L)
- Powerplant: 1 × Rolls-Royce Hawk 6-cylinder liquid-cooled inline piston engine, 75 hp (56 kW)
- Propellers: 2-bladed, 8 ft (2.4 m) diameter

Performance

- Maximum speed: 76 mph (122 km/h, 66 kn) at sea level
- Range: 315 mi (507 km, 274 nmi)
- Endurance: 4 hr
- Service ceiling: 9,000 ft (2,700 m)

== See also ==
Related development

- Sage Type 4

Aircraft of comparable role, configuration, and era

- Avro 504
- Airco DH.6
- Curtiss JN-4
