= Sopwith Atlantic =

Atlantic
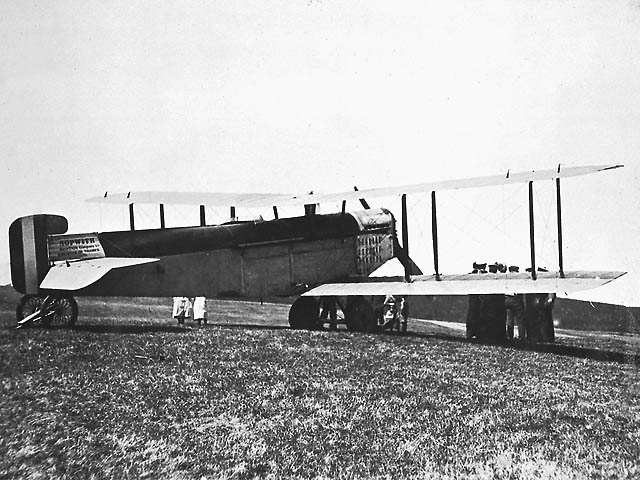

General information
- Type: Long range experimental aircraft
- National origin: United Kingdom
- Manufacturer: Sopwith Aviation Company
- Designer: W G Carter
- Number built: 1

History
- First flight: 1919
- Developed from: Sopwith B.1
- Variant: Sopwith Wallaby

The Sopwith Atlantic was an experimental British long-range aircraft of 1919. It was a single-engined biplane that was designed and built to be the first aeroplane to cross the Atlantic Ocean non-stop. It took off on an attempt to cross the Atlantic from Newfoundland on 18 May 1919, but ditched during the flight owing to an overheating engine.

== Development and design ==
In 1913, the British newspaper the Daily Mail offered a prize of £10,000 for the first flight across the Atlantic. Although plans were drawn up to attempt to win the prize, notably by Rodman Wanamaker, who ordered two Curtiss America flying boats, with John Cyril Porte selected to be the pilot, the outbreak of the First World War in August 1914 put a stop to these plans. Following the Armistice on 11 November 1918, the competition was reopened and Thomas Sopwith, the head of the Sopwith Aviation Company, decided to build an aircraft to compete for the prize.

George Carter of Sopwith based his design for the transatlantic aircraft on the single-engined Sopwith B.1 bomber aircraft. It was a large, two-bay biplane powered by a Rolls-Royce Eagle engine in a tractor configuration. The new aircraft had a deeper fuselage than the B.1, housing a fuel tank carrying 330 imperial gallons (1,500 L) of petrol and with the crew of two sat well aft of the wings. The undercarriage mainwheels were jettisonable to reduce drag, while a boat was provided in case of emergency landing on the sea, being built into the fuselage decking behind the crew's cockpit.

== Operational history ==
Another view of the aircraft, seen here with its engine cowling removed

The transatlantic aircraft, named the Sopwith Atlantic was designed and built quickly, being completed early in 1919. Following testing at Brooklands airfield, the Atlantic was dismantled and dispatched to Newfoundland aboard ship, arriving on 28 March 1919. The aircraft was soon assembled, but weather was poor, with the chosen airstrip at St John's snowbound. Despite the fact that the competing Martinsyde aircraft had also arrived in Newfoundland, the crew of the Atlantic, Australian pilot Harry Hawker and navigator Kenneth Mackenzie Grieve could not attempt the Atlantic flight for several weeks.

Hawker and Grieves finally took off from St John's on 18 May 1919 (other sources: from Mount Pearl). During the night, however, the aircraft's engine started to overheat, possibly because of a blocked filter in the cooling system. After making several attempts to clear the blockage by diving the aircraft and stopping and restarting the engine to attempt to cool it, with the engine still overheating and heavy weather ahead, they turned south to seek out the shipping lanes, and on encountering the Danish steamer SS Mary, ditched in the Atlantic and were rescued, 1,130 mi (1,820 km) from St John's and 750 mi (1,210 km) from Ireland.

As the Mary was not fitted with radio, no news of Hawker and Grieves' rescue had reached the rest of the world, and they were feared to have been killed, a telegram of condolence being sent by King George V until the Mary reached Scotland on 25 May.

The Daily Mail prize was finally won by John Alcock and Arthur Whitten Brown who flew from St. John's to Clifden, Ireland in a Vickers Vimy on 14–15 June 1919. Harry Hawker however won a prize of £5,000 for the first pilot to fly 1,000 miles over the ocean without ditching.

== Specifications ==
Data from Sopwith-The Man and his Aircraft

General characteristics

- Crew: Two
- Length: 32 ft 0 in (9.75 m)
- Wingspan: 46 ft 6 in (14.17 m)
- Height: 11 ft 0 in (3.35 m)
- Wing area: 575 sq ft (53.4 m^{2})
- Empty weight: 3,000 lb (1,361 kg)
- Gross weight: 6,150 lb (2,790 kg)
- Powerplant: 1 × Rolls-Royce Eagle VIII water-cooled V12 engine, 375 hp (280 kW)
- Propellers: 2-bladed propeller, 9 ft 6 in (2.90 m) diameter

Performance

- Maximum speed: 118 mph (190 km/h, 103 kn)
- Cruise speed: 105 mph (169 km/h, 91 kn)
- Service ceiling: 13,000 ft (4,000 m)

== See also ==
Related development

- Sopwith B.1
- Sopwith Wallaby

Aircraft of comparable role, configuration, and era

- Short Shirl
- Boulton Paul Atlantic
- Vickers Vimy
