= Wolseley Viper =

Viper
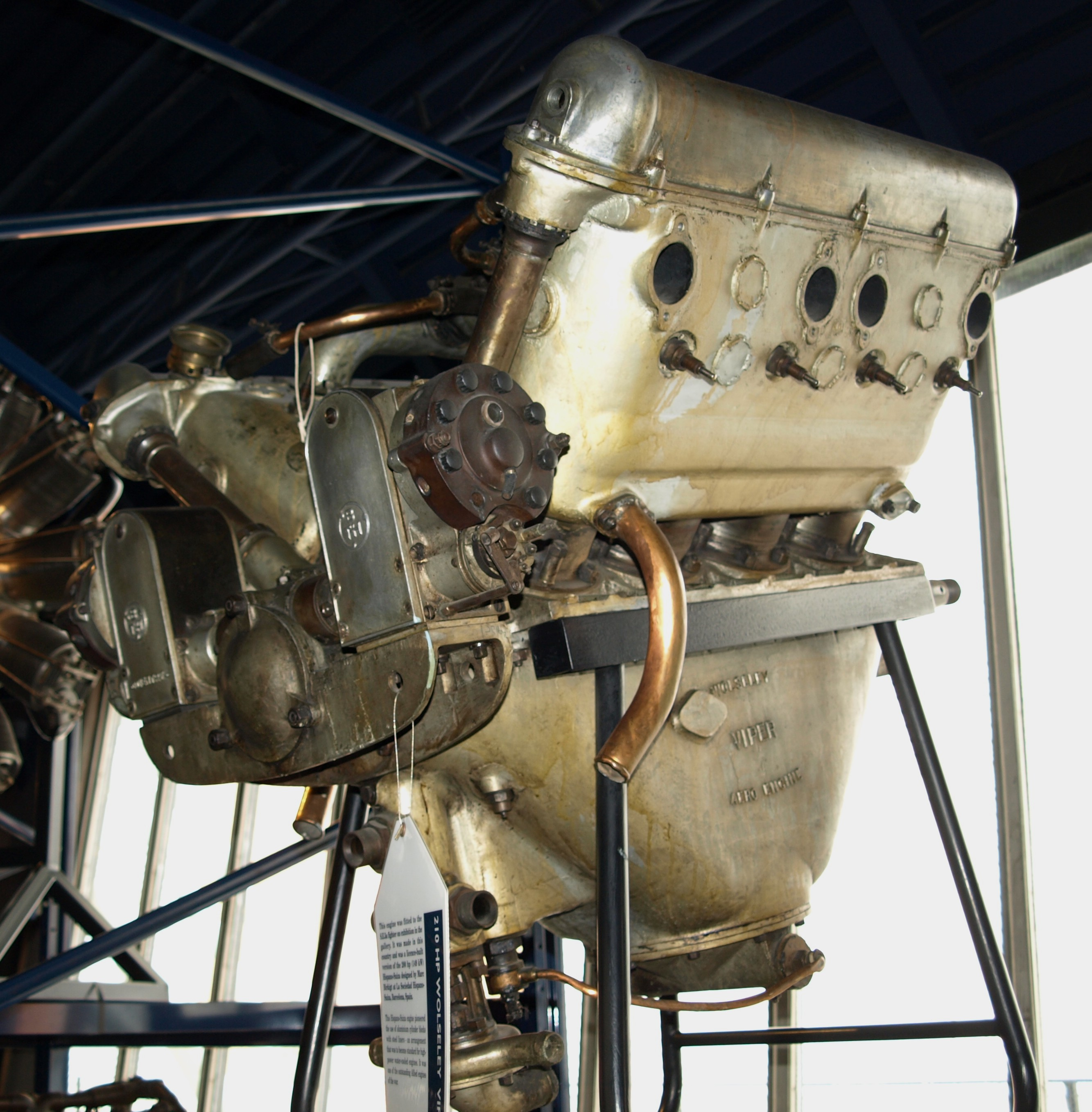
- Rear view of preserved Wolseley Viper
- Type: Piston inline aero-engine
- Manufacturer: Wolseley Motors
- First run: 1918
- Major applications: Royal Aircraft Factory S.E.5

The Wolseley Viper is a British-built, high-compression derivative of the Hispano Suiza HS-8 liquid-cooled V8 engine, built under licence by Wolseley Motors during World War I.

It powered later models of the S.E.5a, SPAD VII and other British or British-built aircraft designed for the Hispano-Suiza.

== Variants ==
- Wolseley W.4A Python I (1917)
  150 hp (110 kW) – licence produced version of the Hispano-Suiza 8Aa with minor structural changes and the weight increased to 455 lb (206 kg), retained the original's low compression 1.8 in (45 mm) pistons and compression ratio of 4.7:1. Only 100 built.
- Wolseley W.4A Python II
  180 hp (130 kW) – high compression version of the Python I with high compression 2 in (50 mm) pistons and compression ratio increased to 5.3:1.
- Wolseley W.4A* Viper (1918)
  200 hp (150 kW) – broadly the equivalent of the Hispano-Suiza 8Ab, compression ratio of 5.3:1 (19 early production engines had a higher compression ratio of 5.6:1), with 200 hp English Hispano propeller hubs.
- Wolseley W.4B Adder I (1918)
  200 hp (150 kW) – modified version of the Hispano-Suiza 8B.
- Wolseley W.4B* Adder II
  200 hp (150 kW) – modified and improved version of the Adder I.
- Wolseley W.4B* Adder III
  200 hp (150 kW) – modified and improved version of the Adder II with balanced crankshaft.

== Applications ==
- Airco DH.9
- Avro 552
- Bristol M.R.1
- Bristol Tourer
- Cierva C.8
- Martinsyde F.6
- Royal Aircraft Factory S.E.5a
- Sopwith Antelope
- Sopwith Cuckoo

== Surviving engines ==
A Wolseley Viper powered Royal Aircraft Factory S.E.5a is owned by, and on display at The Shuttleworth Collection, Old Warden Aerodrome in the UK.

== Engines on display ==
- A preserved Wolseley Viper is on public display at the Science Museum, London.
- A preserved Wolseley Viper is on public display at the Museo Nacional de Aeronáutica de Argentina

== Specifications (W.4A Viper) ==
Data from Gunston and Lumsden

=== General characteristics ===
- Type: Upright, 90 degree V8
- Bore: 4.72 in (120 mm)
- Stroke: 5.12 in (130 mm)
- Displacement: 716.8 cu in (11.7 L)
- Length: 46.2 in (1,170 mm)
- Width: 33.5 in (850 mm)
- Height: 35.4 in (900 mm)
- Dry weight: 455 lb (206 kg)

=== Components ===
- Fuel system: Twin Zenith-Duplex carburettors
- Cooling system: Liquid-cooled
- Reduction gear: Direct drive, Right-hand tractor

=== Performance ===
- Power output: 200–210 hp (150–160 kW)
- Compression ratio: 5.3:1

== See also ==
Related development

- Hispano-Suiza 8

Comparable engines

- Peugeot 8Aa
- Sunbeam Arab

Related lists

- List of aircraft engines
