= Avro 530 =

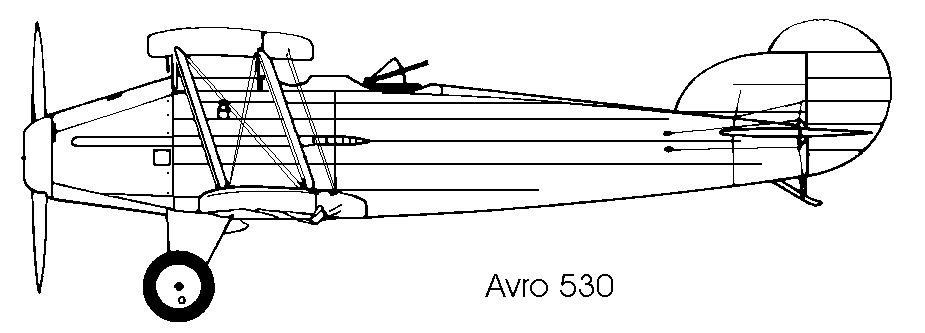

General information
- Type: Fighter
- National origin: United Kingdom
- Manufacturer: Avro
- Number built: 2

History
- First flight: July 1917

The Avro 530 was a British two-seat fighter biplane designed in 1916 to compete with the Bristol F.2A. The plane was first flown in July 1917. It was of fabric-covered wooden construction, powered by a 200 hp (150 kW) Hispano-Suiza engine.

== Operational history ==
Although performance of the Avro 530 proved to be good, it did not improve sufficiently on the Bristol F.2A and as such no production orders were issued. Another issue was that priority for the Hispano-Suiza engines which powered the 530 was being given to the S.E.5a. In 1918, a second 530 was fitted with a 200 hp (150 kW) Sunbeam Arab engine, but development was subsequently abandoned.

== Specifications (first prototype) ==
Data from

General characteristics

- Crew: 2
- Length: 28 ft 6 in (8.69 m)
- Wingspan: 36 ft 0 in (10.97 m)
- Height: 9 ft 7 in (2.92 m)
- Wing area: 325.5 sq ft (30.24 m^{2})
- Airfoil: RAF 14
- Empty weight: 1,695 lb (769 kg)
- Gross weight: 2,680 lb (1,216 kg)
- Powerplant: 1 × Hispano-Suiza 8 V-8 water-cooled piston engine, 200 hp (150 kW)
- Propellers: 2-bladed fixed-pitch propeller

Performance

- Maximum speed: 114 mph (183 km/h, 99 kn)
- Cruise speed: 95 mph (153 km/h, 83 kn)
- Endurance: 4 hours
- Time to altitude: 6 min 30 s to 5,000 ft (1,500 m)

Armament

- Guns:

- 1 × engine-mounted .303 in (7.7 mm) Vickers machine gun
- 1 × rear-mounted .303 in (7.7 mm) Lewis Gun
