= Port Victoria Grain Griffin =

Grain Griffin
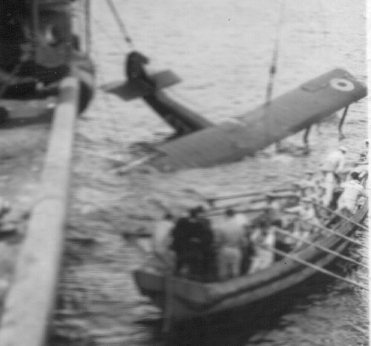
- A Grain Griffin ditched alongside HMS Vindictive, Baltic Sea, 1919.

General information
- Type: Carrier-based reconnaissance aircraft
- National origin: United Kingdom
- Manufacturer: RNAS Marine Experimental Depot, Port Victoria
- Primary user: Royal Air Force
- Number built: 8

History
- Developed from: Sopwith B.1

The Grain Griffin was a British carrier-based reconnaissance aircraft developed and built by the RNAS Marine Experimental Depot, Port Victoria, during the First World War. A development of the unsuccessful Sopwith B.1 bomber, the Grain Griffin was a two-seat single-engined biplane that was built in small numbers for Britain's Royal Naval Air Service, being used operationally during the British intervention in the Russian Civil War.

== Development and design ==
In late 1916, Sopwith designed and built a prototype of a single-engined single-seat bomber, the Sopwith B.1. It had demonstrated good performance, and had been briefly evaluated by the RNAS in the bomber role over the Western Front in May–June 1917, but was rejected, with larger twin-engined bombers being preferred.

After its return from France, the prototype B.1 (serial no. N.50), was sent to the RNAS Marine Experimental Depot at Port Victoria on the Isle of Grain for conversion to a two-seat reconnaissance aircraft, to be fitted with folding wings for operation from the Royal Navy's aircraft carriers. A cockpit for the observer replaced the bomb-bay of the B.1 behind the pilot's cockpit, while the wings were shortened to allow them to fold. A hydroplane was fitted ahead of the undercarriage and floatation gear added to allow safe ditching at sea. It retained the Hispano-Suiza 8 engine used by the bomber. When the modified aircraft was tested in November 1917, it was found that the changes had greatly reduced the aircraft's performance, while handling was also poor, with little aileron control.

The design office at Port Victoria had realised prior to the first flight that the proposed changes would not be beneficial to performance, and had commenced design of a modified design, based on the B.1, to solve these problems. These changes included new, longer-span, two-bay wings and a wider fuselage to give room to carry a radio for the observer. The new aircraft was given the name Grain Griffin. N.50 was modified with the new wings and modified controls which greatly improved performance and handling.

The first of the true Griffins, serial number N.100, powered by a 200 hp (149 kW) Sunbeam Arab engine, started testing in June 1918. A further six Griffins followed, with one powered by the unreliable Arab and the remaining five powered by the 230 hp Bentley BR2 rotary engine.

== Operational history ==
The Griffins did not see service during the First World War. however, in July 1919, at least three Griffins were deployed on board the aircraft carrier HMS Vindictive when it sailed to the Baltic Sea in support of the British intervention in the Baltic as part of the Russian Civil War. The Griffin was replaced in service by the Parnall Panther, which was chosen to equip the Royal Air Force's Fleet Spotter squadrons.

== Operators ==
United Kingdom

- Royal Air Force

== Specifications (Griffin (BR.2 engine)) ==
Data from British Aeroplanes 1914-18

General characteristics

- Crew: 2
- Length: 27 ft 6 in (8.38 m)
- Wingspan: 42 ft 6 in (12.95 m)
- Height: 10 ft 0 in (3.05 m)
- Wing area: 506 sq ft (47.0 m^{2})
- Empty weight: 1,675 lb (760 kg)
- Gross weight: 2,858 lb (1,296 kg)
- Powerplant: 1 × Bentley BR2 9-cylinder air-cooled rotary piston engine, 230 hp (170 kW)
- Propellers: 2-bladed fixed-pitch propeller

Performance

- Maximum speed: 112 mph (180 km/h, 97 kn) at 6,500 ft (2,000 m)
- Service ceiling: 16,500 ft (5,000 m)
- Time to altitude: 10,000 ft (3,000 m) in 15 minutes 55 seconds
- Wing loading: 5.65 lb/sq ft (27.6 kg/m^{2})
- Power/mass: 0.080 hp/lb (0.132 kW/kg)

Armament

- Guns: 1 × .303 in Lewis gun behind rear cockpit

== See also ==
Related development

- Sopwith B.1

Related lists

- List of aircraft of the Royal Naval Air Service
