= Sage Type 2 =

1916 prototype British fighter aircraft

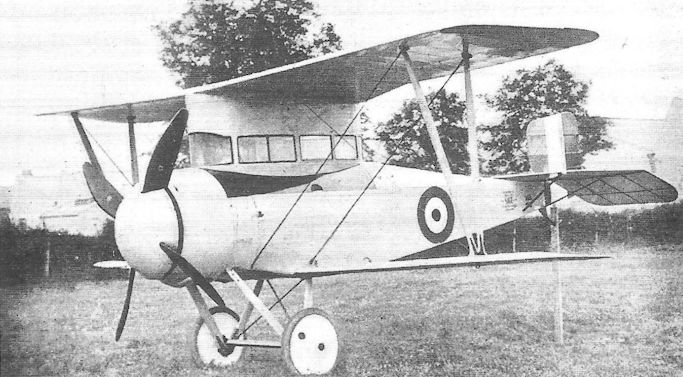

General information
- Type: Fighter aircraft
- National origin: United Kingdom
- Manufacturer: Frederic Sage & Co. Limited
- Designer: Clifford Tinson
- Status: Prototype
- Number built: 1

History
- First flight: 10 August 1916

The Sage Type 2 was a prototype British two-seat fighter aircraft of the First World War. A single-engined biplane with an enclosed cabin for its crew, only a single example was built, as more advanced aircraft became available.

== Development and design ==
The long-established woodworking company, Frederick Sage & Co, which specialised in shopfitting, set up an aircraft department in early 1915, hiring the well known test pilot and designer, Eric Gordon England, to lead the department, and recruiting Clifford Tinson, formerly deputy to Frank Barnwell at the Bristol Aeroplane Company early in 1916.

Tinson's first design for Sage was a two-seat fighter aircraft, the Sage Type 2. It was a small wood-and-fabric tractor biplane (in fact the two-seat Sage was smaller than many single-seaters of the time), with single-bay wings. The pilot and gunner sat in an enclosed, glazed cabin that filled the gap between the fuselage and upper wing. Because of the lack of effective gun synchronising gear to allow a fixed gun to fire through the propeller disc, a hole was cut in the upper wing above the gunners seat, so the gunner could stand with head and shoulders above the wing, giving him a good all-round field of fire for his Lewis gun, including forward over the propeller. The aircraft was powered by a Gnome Monosoupape rotary engine driving a four-bladed propeller.

The prototype first flew on 10 August 1916, and demonstrated good performance and manoeuvrability, being easy to fly. It was wrecked in a crash landing during a test flight at Cranwell on 20 September 1916 after the rudder post failed. No further development was carried out, as by this time, effective synchronising gear was available to the British, and the Sopwith 1½ Strutter was already in service.

== Specifications ==
Data from British Aeroplanes 1914–18

General characteristics

- Crew: Two
- Length: 21 ft 1 5/8 in (6.442 m)
- Wingspan: 22 ft 2 1/2 in (6.769 m)
- Height: 9 ft 6 in (2.90 m)
- Wing area: 168 sq ft (15.6 m^{2})
- Empty weight: 890 lb (404 kg)
- Gross weight: 1,546 lb (701 kg)
- Fuel capacity: 27.5 imp gal (33.0 US gal; 125 L)
- Powerplant: 1 × Gnome Monosoupape rotary engine, 100 hp (75 kW)
- Propellers: 4-bladed, 8 ft 0 in (2.44 m) diameter

Performance

- Maximum speed: 112 mph (180 km/h, 97 kn) at sea level
- Range: 308 mi (496 km, 268 nmi)
- Endurance: 2.5 hr
- Service ceiling: 16,000 ft (4,900 m)
- Time to altitude:
  - 6 min 30 s to 5,000 ft (1,500 m)
  - 14 min 45 s to 10,000 ft (3,000 m)
  - 35 min to 15,000 ft (4,600 m)

Armament

- Guns: 1× .303 in Lewis gun operated by observe

== See also ==
Aircraft of comparable role, configuration, and era

- Nieuport 10
- Sopwith 1½ Strutter
