= Sunbeam Bomber =

General information
- Type: Bomber
- National origin: United Kingdom
- Manufacturer: Sunbeam Motor Car Company

History
- Manufactured: 1
- First flight: 1917

The Sunbeam Bomber was a prototype single-engined, single seat bomber aircraft of the First World War. Only one example flew as the type proved to be unsuccessful and was abandoned.

== Design and development ==
Following the outbreak of the First World War, the Sunbeam Motor Car Company became a major supplier of licence-built aircraft for the Royal Naval Air Service (RNAS), in addition to its existing work as a designer and builder of aero-engines and motor vehicles. In November 1916, a requirement for a single-engined, single-seat bomber was issued on behalf of the RNAS, and when Sunbeam decided to design an aircraft to respond to this specification, it received an order for two prototypes from the Admiralty.

Sunbeam's design was a two-bay biplane of conventional tractor configuration. It was powered by one of Sunbeam's own Arab V8 engines rated at 200 horsepower (150 kW) and driving a two-bladed propeller. The aircraft's fuel tanks were located in the fuselage at the aircraft's centre of gravity, which resulted in the pilot's cockpit being well behind the wings (and 13 feet (4.0 m) behind the nose). Racks for three 100 lb (45 kg) bombs were fitted under the wings, while a single forward-firing synchronized Vickers machine gun was mounted above the aircraft's engine.

The first prototype, serial number N515 first flew at Castle Bromwich in late 1917, but exhibited a number of problems. The Puma engine, despite being ordered in large numbers, was unreliable and suffered from severe vibration, which considerably delayed service testing. The aircraft's layout, with the pilot sitting so far aft, gave him a poor view, and sitting 8 feet (2.4 m) away from the Vickers gun, could no nothing to resolve any gun stoppage. When eventually formally tested, in August 1918, it proved to be heavier and carry fewer bombs than the private venture Sopwith B.1 of similar concept. The second prototype was abandoned before it was completed, and no orders were placed either for the Sunbeam or the Sopwith, which were incapable of defending themselves against attacking enemy fighters Existing two-seat aircraft such as the Airco DH.4 better met the RNAS's (and later the Royal Air Force's) requirements.

== Specifications ==
Data from British Aeroplanes 1914–18

General characteristics

- Crew: 1
- Length: 36 ft 6 in (11.13 m)
- Wingspan: 42 ft 0 in (12.80 m)
- Height: 11 ft 0 in (3.35 m)
- Wing area: 466 sq ft (43.3 m^{2})
- Empty weight: 1,915 lb (869 kg)
- Gross weight: 2,952 lb (1,339 kg)
- Powerplant: 1 × Sunbeam Arab water-cooled V8 engine, 200 hp (150 kW)

Performance

- Maximum speed: 112.5 mph (181.1 km/h, 97.8 kn) at 6,000 ft (1,800 m)
- Endurance: 4 1/2 hr at 15,000 ft (4,600 m)
- Service ceiling: 18,500 ft (5,600 m)
- Time to altitude: **14 min 20 s to 10,000 ft (3,000 m)
  - 28 min 5 s to 15,000 ft (4,600 m)

Armament

- Guns: 1× 0.303 in (7.7 mm) Vickers machine gun
- Bombs: 3× 100 lb (45 kg) bombs under wings

== See also ==
Aircraft of comparable role, configuration, and era

- Sopwith B.1
