= Sopwith Cuckoo =

British torpedo bomber

T.1 Cuckoo
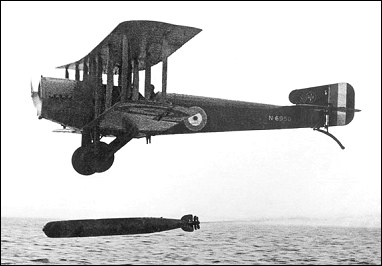
- T.1 Cuckoo

General information
- Type: Torpedo bomber
- National origin: United Kingdom
- Manufacturer: Sopwith Aviation Company
- Primary user: Royal Air Force
- Number built: 232

History
- Introduction date: 1918
- First flight: June 1917
- Retired: 1923

The Sopwith T.1 Cuckoo was a British biplane torpedo bomber used by the Royal Naval Air Service (RNAS), and its successor organization, the Royal Air Force (RAF). The T.1 was the first landplane specifically designed for carrier operations, but it was completed too late for service in the First World War. After the Armistice, the T.1 was named the Cuckoo.

== Design and development ==
In October 1916, Commodore Murray Sueter, the Air Department Superintendent of Aircraft Construction, solicited Sopwith for a single-seat aircraft capable of carrying a 1,000 lb (450 kg) torpedo and sufficient fuel to provide an endurance of four hours. The resulting aircraft, called T.1 by Sopwith, was a large, three-bay biplane. Because the T.1 was designed to operate from carrier decks, its wings were hinged to fold backwards. The T.1 could take off from a carrier deck in four seconds but it was not capable of making a carrier landing and no arresting gear was fitted. A split-axle undercarriage allowed the aircraft to carry a 1,000 lb (450 kg) Mk. IX torpedo beneath the fuselage.

The prototype T.1 first flew in June 1917, powered by a 200 hp (150 kW) Hispano-Suiza 8Ba engine. Official trials commenced in July 1917 and the Admiralty issued production orders for 100 aircraft in August. Contractors Fairfield Engineering and Pegler & Company had no experience as aircraft manufacturers resulting in substantial production delays. The S.E.5a had priority for the limited supplies of the Hispano-Suiza 8 engine. Redesign of the T.1 airframe to accommodate the heavier Sunbeam Arab incurred further delays.

In February 1918, the Admiralty issued a production order to Blackburn Aircraft, an experienced aircraft manufacturer. Blackburn delivered its first T.1 in May 1918. The aircraft immediately experienced undercarriage and tailskid failures, requiring redesign of those components. The T.1 also required an enlarged rudder and offset fin to combat its tendency to swing to the right. Fairfield and Pegler finally began production in August and October, respectively.

A total of 300 T.1s were ordered, but only 90 aircraft had been delivered by the Armistice. A total of 232 aircraft had been completed by the time production ended in 1919. Blackburn Aircraft produced 162 aircraft, while Fairfield Engineering completed 50 and Pegler & Company completed another 20. After the Armistice, many T.1s were delivered directly to storage depots at Renfrew and Newcastle.

== Operational history ==
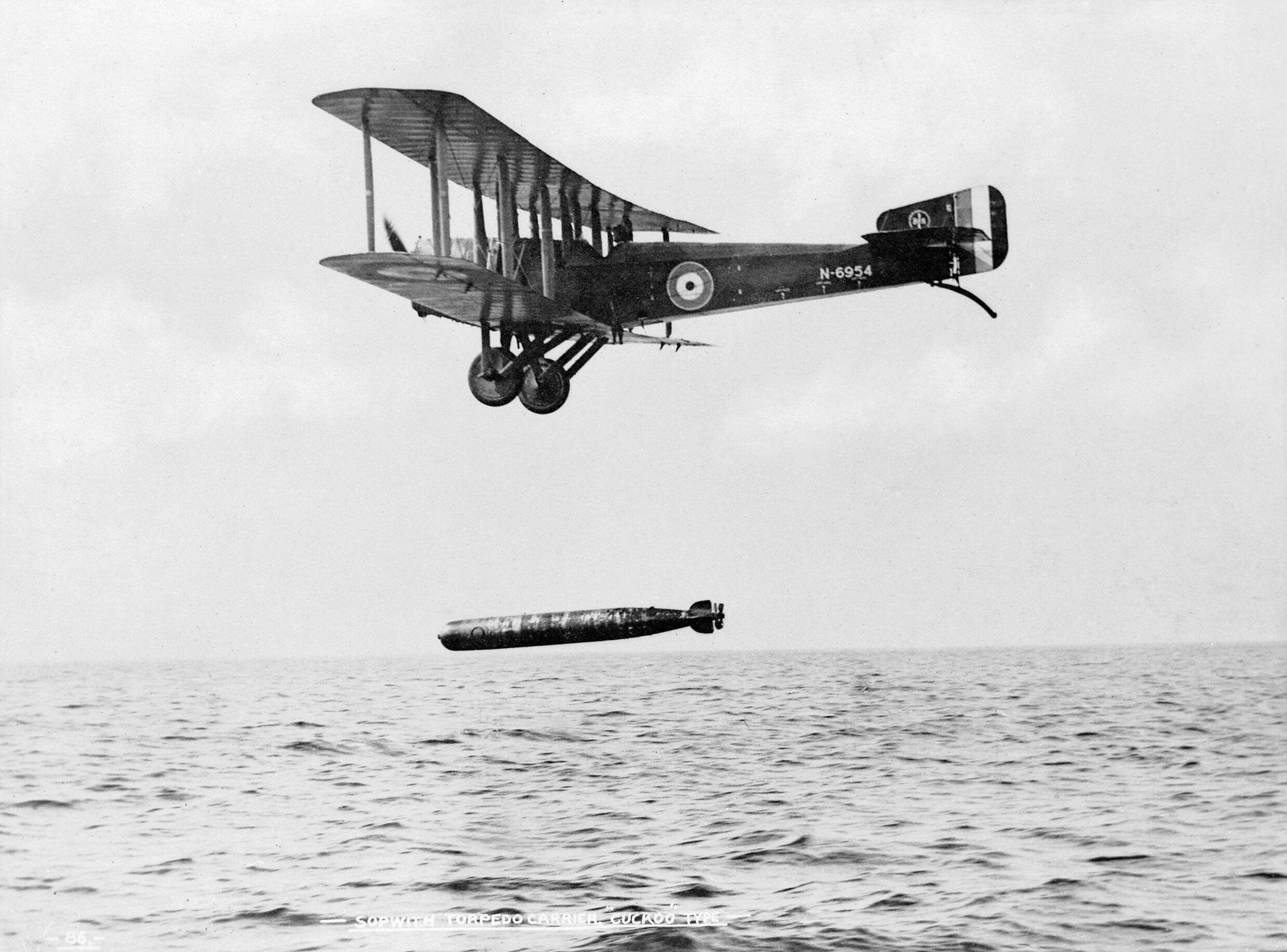
Cuckoo launching practice torpedo

After undergoing service trials at RAF East Fortune, the T.1 was recommended for squadron service. Deliveries to the Torpedo Aeroplane School at East Fortune commenced in early August 1918. Training took place in the Firth of Forth, where Cuckoos launched practice torpedoes at targets towed by destroyers. Cuckoos of 185 Squadron embarked on HMS Argus in November 1918 but hostilities ended before the aircraft could conduct any combat operations.

In service, the aircraft was generally popular with pilots because the airframe was strong and water landings were safe. The T.1 was easy to control and was fully aerobatic without a torpedo. The Arab engine proved unsatisfactory and approximately 20 T.1s were converted to use Wolseley Viper engines. These aircraft, later called Cuckoo Mk. IIs, could be distinguished by the Viper's lower thrust line. The Arab-engined variant was named Cuckoo Mk. I. The Cuckoo's operational career ended when the last unit to use the type, 210 Squadron, disbanded at Gosport on 1 April 1923. The Cuckoo was replaced in service by the Blackburn Dart.

=== Planned use ===
In 1917, Commodore Sueter proposed plans for an aerial torpedo attack on the German High Seas Fleet at its base in Germany. The carriers Argus, Furious, and Campania and the converted cruisers Courageous and Glorious, were to have launched 100 Cuckoos from the North Sea. In September 1917, Admiral Sir David Beatty, commander of the Grand Fleet, proposed a similar plan involving 120 Cuckoos launched from eight converted merchant vessels.

== Variants ==
Cuckoo Mk. I
Main production variant. Powered by a 200 hp (150 kW) Sunbeam Arab engine.
Cuckoo Mk. II
Mk. I converted to use a 200 hp (150 kW) Wolseley Viper engine.
Cuckoo Mk. III
Prototype powered by a 275 hp (205 kW) Rolls-Royce Falcon III engine.
Sopwith B.1
Single-seat bomber powered by a 200 hp (150 kW) Hispano-Suiza 8 engine. Two prototypes built.

== Operators ==
Japan

- Imperial Japanese Navy Air Service - Operated six Cuckoo Mk. II aircraft.

United Kingdom

- Royal Naval Air Service
- Royal Air Force
  - No. 185 Squadron RAF - Used Cuckoo from October 1918 but was disbanded the following year.
  - No. 186 Squadron RAF - Used Cuckoo from late 1918. Was renamed No. 210 Squadron in 1920.
  - No. 210 Squadron RAF - Formed in 1920 from No. 186 Squadron, and continued to use the Cuckoo until 1 April 1923 when the unit disbanded.

== Surviving aircraft ==
Today, no complete Cuckoo airframe survives, but a set of Cuckoo Mk. I wings are preserved at the National Museum of Flight in Scotland.

== Specifications (Mk. I) ==
Data from British Naval Aircraft Since 1912

General characteristics

- Crew: 1
- Length: 28 ft 6 in (8.69 m)
- Wingspan: 46 ft 9 in (14.25 m)
- Height: 10 ft 8 in (3.25 m)
- Wing area: 566 sq ft (52.6 m^{2})
- Empty weight: 2,199 lb (997 kg)
- Gross weight: 3,883 lb (1,761 kg)
- Powerplant: 1 × Sunbeam Arab V-8 water-cooled piston engine, 200 hp (150 kW)
- Propellers: 2-bladed fixed-pitch propeller

Performance

- Maximum speed: 105.5 mph (169.8 km/h, 91.7 kn)
- Range: 335 mi (539 km, 291 nmi)
- Service ceiling: 12,100 ft (3,700 m)

Armament

- Bombs: 1 × 18-inch Mk.IX torpedo

== See also ==
- Sempill Mission

Related development

- Sopwith B.1

Related lists

- List of aircraft of the Royal Air Force
- List of aircraft of the Royal Naval Air Service
