= Australian Aircraft & Engineering =

Defunct Australian aircraft manufacturer

Australian Aircraft & Engineering Co. Ltd. was formed in 1919 by N. B. Love, W. J. Warneford and H. E. Broadsmith. The company was registered in Sydney on 1 October 1919 with capital of £50,000 with the intention of manufacturing aircraft in Australia.

== Flying ==
The company began flying operations at Sydney Airport on 9 January 1920 following the delivery of 20 Avro 504K aircraft on the ship SS Commonwealth.

== Engineering ==
They fitted a Sunbeam Dyak engine to the first Qantas aircraft to replace the original Gnome rotary engine.

== Agency ==
The company secured the Australian agency for Avro aircraft, assembling a number of Avro 504K aircraft. The Broadsmith-designed Broadsmith B.1 (as AA & E Commercial B1) was also built by the company. This aircraft was a 6-seat biplane.

== Bankruptcy ==
The company went bankrupt in 1922 whilst building six 504Ks for the Royal Australian Air Force, and went into liquidation in March 1923.

== See also ==
- Commonwealth Aircraft Corporation
- Larkin Aircraft Supply Company
