= Sunbeam Dyak =

British carburettor engine

Dyak
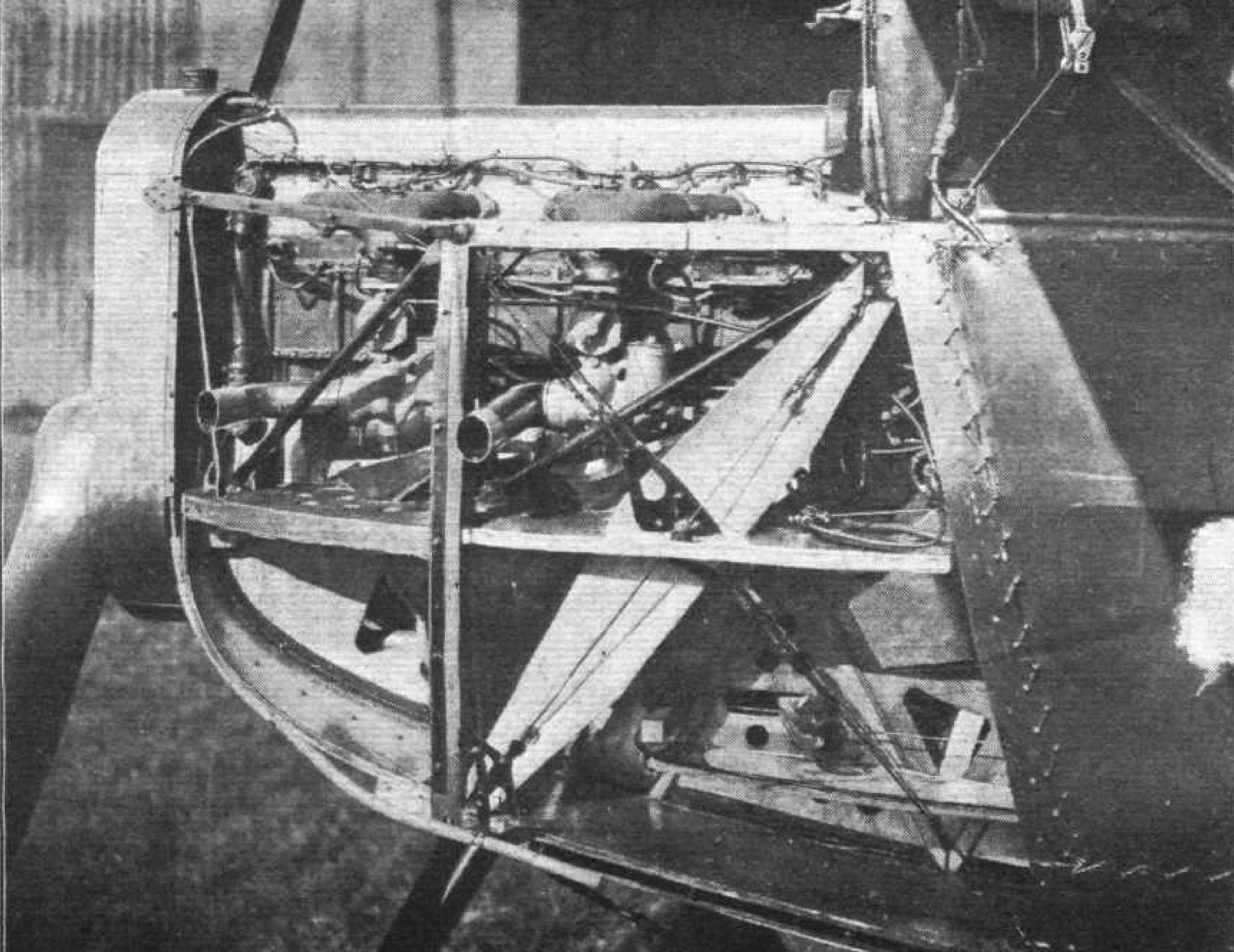
- Sunbeam Dyak in an Avro 504K
- Type: Piston inline aero-engine
- Manufacturer: Sunbeam
- First run: May 1918
- Major applications: Avro 504
- Variants: Sunbeam Pathan

The Sunbeam Dyak was a British inline six-cylinder, water-cooled, twin updraft carburettor engine.

It had an aluminium sump, block and cylinder head, and is an overhead camshaft design with two valves per cylinder. The output was approximately 106 horsepower (79 kW). The engine was started by turning a geared crank handle in the cockpit. The diesel-powered Sunbeam Pathan was developed from this engine.

The first Queensland and Northern Territory Aerial Services (QANTAS) aircraft in Australia (an Avro 504K) was fitted with a Sunbeam Dyak engine by the Australian Aircraft & Engineering Co. Ltd. in Mascot, New South Wales.

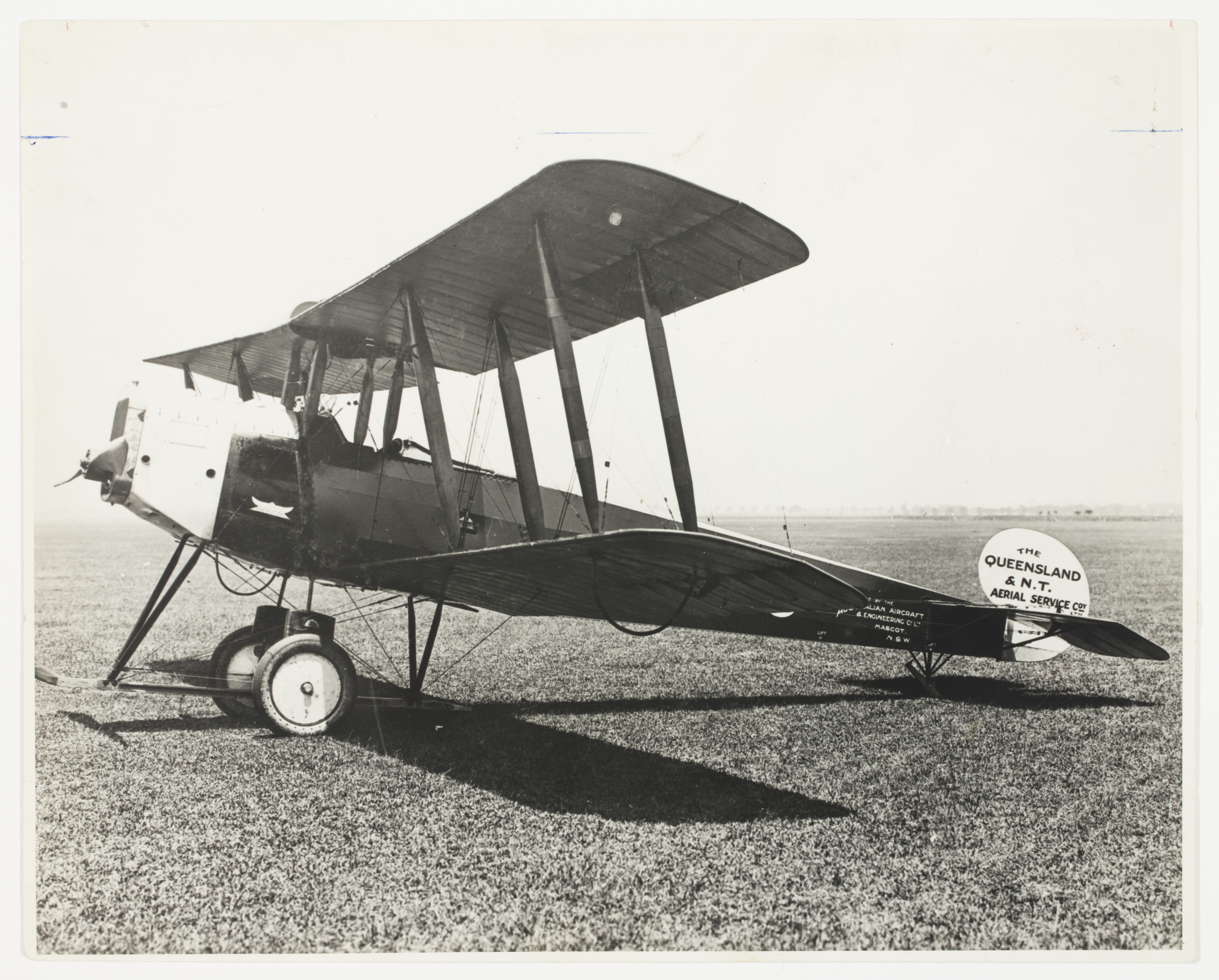
Avro Dyak used by QANTAS (c. 1921)

== Specifications (Dyak) ==
Data from Lumsden

=== General characteristics ===
- Type: 6-cylinder, upright, inline engine
- Bore: 4.72 in (120 mm)
- Stroke: 5.12 in (130 mm)
- Displacement: 538.26 cu in (8.8 L)
- Dry weight: 399 lb

=== Components ===
- Valvetrain: Overhead camshaft, two valves per cylinder
- Cooling system: Liquid-cooled
- Reduction gear: Direct drive, left-hand tractor

=== Performance ===
- Power output: 100 hp at 1,200 rpm (takeoff power)
- Compression ratio: 5:1

== See also ==
Comparable engines

- Benz Bz.II

Related lists

- List of aircraft engines
