= Frederick Sage & Company =

- Type: Shop fitting company, aircraft manufacturer (during WWI and WWII)
- Industry: Construction, aviation
- Founded: 1860 in London, England
- Founder: Frederick Sage
- Defunct: 1968
- Fate: Became a subsidiary of British Electric Traction
- Headquarters: London, United Kingdom
- Area served: Europe, South Africa, South America
- Key people: Frederick Sage, Jesse Hawes, Eric Gordon England
- Products: Shop fittings, aircraft (Short 184, Avro 504K, Airspeed Horsa gliders)
- Parent: British Electric Traction (after 1968)

Frederick Sage & Company was a British shop fitting company based in London with an extensive practice in Europe, South Africa, and South America. During both world wars it built and designed aircraft, and after the Second World War it executed much of the woodwork for the rebuilt House of Commons.

== Origins ==
The founder, Frederick Sage (1830–1898) was born at Freston, a small village near Ipswich in Suffolk, the son of the village carpenter. Following his father's profession, he showed great ingenuity when young, for instance designing a velocipede to make it easier to sell small items of joinery he had made around the neighbourhood. After working for local firms of builders, his ambition took him to London in 1851 where for three years he continued working for builders, studying in evening schools to remedy his lack of education. Having married, and finding work hard to come by, he started his own shopfitting business in 1860 in Hatton Garden.

By 1870 Frederick Sage owned buildings in Gray's Inn Road, including show rooms and "steam works" nearby in Portpool Street. In 1876 he received an award along with many other British firms at the Centennial Exhibition in Philadelphia for an exhibit of "air-tight showcases &c". In 1879 he was offering to warehouse showcases from the Paris Exhibition for the forthcoming one in Sydney.

== Development ==
Frederick Sage took three of his nephews, Frederick, Josiah, and Jesse Hawes, into the business and eventually they became partners, along with his son. Jesse Hawes was the principal mover in the firm's development after Frederick Sage's death. In 1905 the firm became a public company with a capital of £300,000. That year marked the end of five years when they had devoted almost all their resources to fitting out Harrods in Knightsbridge, London. There was for a time a branch in Manchester which closed in 1910. More large-scale work was done in London at other department stores, D. H. Evans in Oxford Street, between 1907 and 1909, and Selfridges. Sage has also worked on hotels, restaurants, even interiors of many of the great liners for Cunard and P&O.

Jesse Hawes' great triumph was the expansion of Sage's around the world. He had been at the Philadelphia exhibition in 1876, and in South Africa and various European countries before Frederick Sage's death. He recommended an office in Cape Town and a factory followed there in 1901. Eventually the business moved to Johannesburg, and a great deal of high-class work was done in South Africa before the business became a subsidiary firm based there in 1947. From the Berlin branch contracts were secured in Finland and around the old Austro-Hungarian Empire which was to break up at the end of the Great War – in Vienna, Budapest, and Belgrade. After World War I a factory was opened in Paris where much work was done: Au Printemps, La Maison Barclay, The Louvre, and so on, and in French provincial cities too, and contracts managed from Paris in Algeria, Egypt, Romania, and Turkey.

== Aircraft production ==
To meet the wartime need for seaplanes in 1915 the company was one of six selected by the Admiralty to build the Short Type 184 under sub-contract. Originally 12 aircraft were ordered but the company went on to build more than 80 Short 184s. The Peterborough factory which had been acquired in 1910, conveniently by the Great Northern main line railway, with sidings, also used its woodworking skills to build cabins for non-rigid airships. The company also went on to build large numbers of Avro 504K trainer in a factory at Holborn in London, with a total of at least 408 completed. Orders were also placed for 130 Sopwith Camels, but this was cancelled due to the end of the war.

Not content with building aircraft on sub-contract the company also set up an aircraft design team which from 1916 included the aviator and aircraft designer Eric Gordon England.

- Sage Type 1 was a design for a twin-engined bomber that was not built.
- Sage Type 2 was a biplane-fighter with an enclosed cabin, the Admiralty ordered six but only one was built.
- Sage Type 3 was a biplane-trainer also known as the Sage N3 School, 30 ordered but only two built.
- Sage Type 4 was a seaplane trainer also known as the Sage N4 School, two built.

With the end of the war and the availability of surplus former-military aircraft the company closed the design department and returned to wood working and shop fitting.

It became involved in aircraft production again during the Second World War, building forward fuselages for Airspeed Horsa gliders.

== 1920s ==
In 1921 the Galeries Lafayette in Regent Street was thought a spectacular triumph for the firm, and other work was done in connection with the controversial rebuilding of that prestigious shopping street. In 1926 the Peterborough temporary building was rebuilt and branches were opened in Leeds and Glasgow. Belfast eventually had a branch too. But the Great Depression of 1929 onwards, which spread rapidly around the world, caused a severe jolt to the firm. The Argentina operation, already suffering from a strike in which the local director was stabbed in the back, was particularly badly hit. Sage's were so affected by the depression that they made losses for four years running and did not pay a dividend again until 1936.

== Second World War ==
At the beginning of the war normal commercial work dried up and it was not easy to find work for the factories until hard work secured government contracts back in the aeroplane business. When the contract for wings for the Albemarle was secured, needing expensive jigs for assembly, it was decided that Central London was becoming too risky, the Blitz having started. Sage's leased a building in the western suburbs, at Harlesden. On the morning of 17 April 1941 Sage's main factory and office premises in Gray's Inn Road were bombed and entirely destroyed by fire just before the employees arrived for work. The draughtsmen and planning department and all the key factory employees were sent to the Harlesden factory. A shopfitting competitor, a former Sage's employee, offered his factory at Ilford, and a section of a factory at Enfield was requisitioned for the firm by the Ministry of Aircraft Production. And so the firm carried on through the war, its efforts eventually entirely devoted to the war effort.

== Last years ==
Starting again after the second world war was even more difficult than after the first, because of the many restrictions and the centralised control which the new Labour government thought necessary. But new display rooms and offices were built in central London, in Verulam street near the old premises. New factories were acquired in the north London suburbs – Harringay, South Tottenham, Dalston. There was even a factory at Mountain Ash in the Cynon Valley of South Wales for manufacturing sheet metal and architectural metalwork.

There was work for shops, ships, churches, museums, but the most known was their post-war work in the Palace of Westminster following the bombing of the House of Commons.

The firm began to show strains in the early 1960s when they began a difficult "reorganisation". They still did much work, including buying a firm making scenery and exhibition stands, City Display organisation, and even had a television scenery contract when the medium was still quite new. In 1965 they had difficulty in completing contracts and this continued. In 1968, "unobtrusively" as The Times put it, Sage's became a subsidiary of British Electric Traction, remained in name for a while longer but eventually disappeared.

Frederick Sage continued to operate from its Haringay base until 1989 whereupon it merged with Brent Metal and moved to Wembley where it struggled on for a few more years as part of Courtney Pope Holdings, until the Group's eventual demise.
