= Sunbeam Pathan =

1920s British piston aircraft engine

- Type: 6-cyl. In-line, water-cooled, diesel, piston engine.
- Manufacturer: Sunbeam
- Designer: Louis Coatalen
- First run: 1929
- Number built: prototypes only
- Developed from: Sunbeam Dyak

The Sunbeam Pathan, also known as the Sunbeam P.1, was a 1920s British diesel aero engine.

== Design and development ==
Louis Coatalen, Sunbeam engine designer, started work on a diesel powered aero-engine, that would be suitable for use in airships, in 1928. Using his experience with both aero-engines and auto-mobile diesel engines, the result, given the company designation P.1, was based on the Dyak. Given the name Pathan, a prototype engine was displayed at the 1929 Olympia Aero Show, but attracted no orders.

Using the same bore and stroke of the Dyak (120mm x 130mm - 4.72in x 5.12in ), the Pathan was a water-cooled six-cylinder in-line diesel engine with a cubic capacity of 8.8l (537cu in). Rated to give 100 hp (74.6 kW) @ 1,500rpm the engine was fitted with a new type of fuel injection system allowing cold starts without other assistance.

The engine did not enter production as the British Airship Programme was cancelled, and with no need for the engine only prototypes were built.

Coatalen continued the development of Diesel engines after he left Sunbeam and returned to France, developing the Coatalen V-12 Diesel engine with limited success, due to the German invasion of 1940 halting further work.

== Specifications ==
Data from

=== General characteristics ===
- Type: 6-cylinder, inline diesel engine
- Bore: 4.72 in (120 mm)
- Stroke: 5.12 in (130 mm)
- Displacement: 537 cu in (8.8l)

=== Components ===
- Fuel system: Direct fuel injection
- Fuel type: Diesel oil
- Oil system: Dry sump, pressure fed
- Cooling system: Liquid-cooled

=== Performance ===
- Power output: 100hp at 1,500 rpm
- Specific fuel consumption: 0.169 L/kW/hr (0.4 pints/hp/hr)
- Oil consumption: 0.0127 L/kW/hr (0.03 pints/hp/hr)

== See also ==
Related lists

- List of aircraft engines
