= Avro 504 =

1913 multi-role military aircraft family

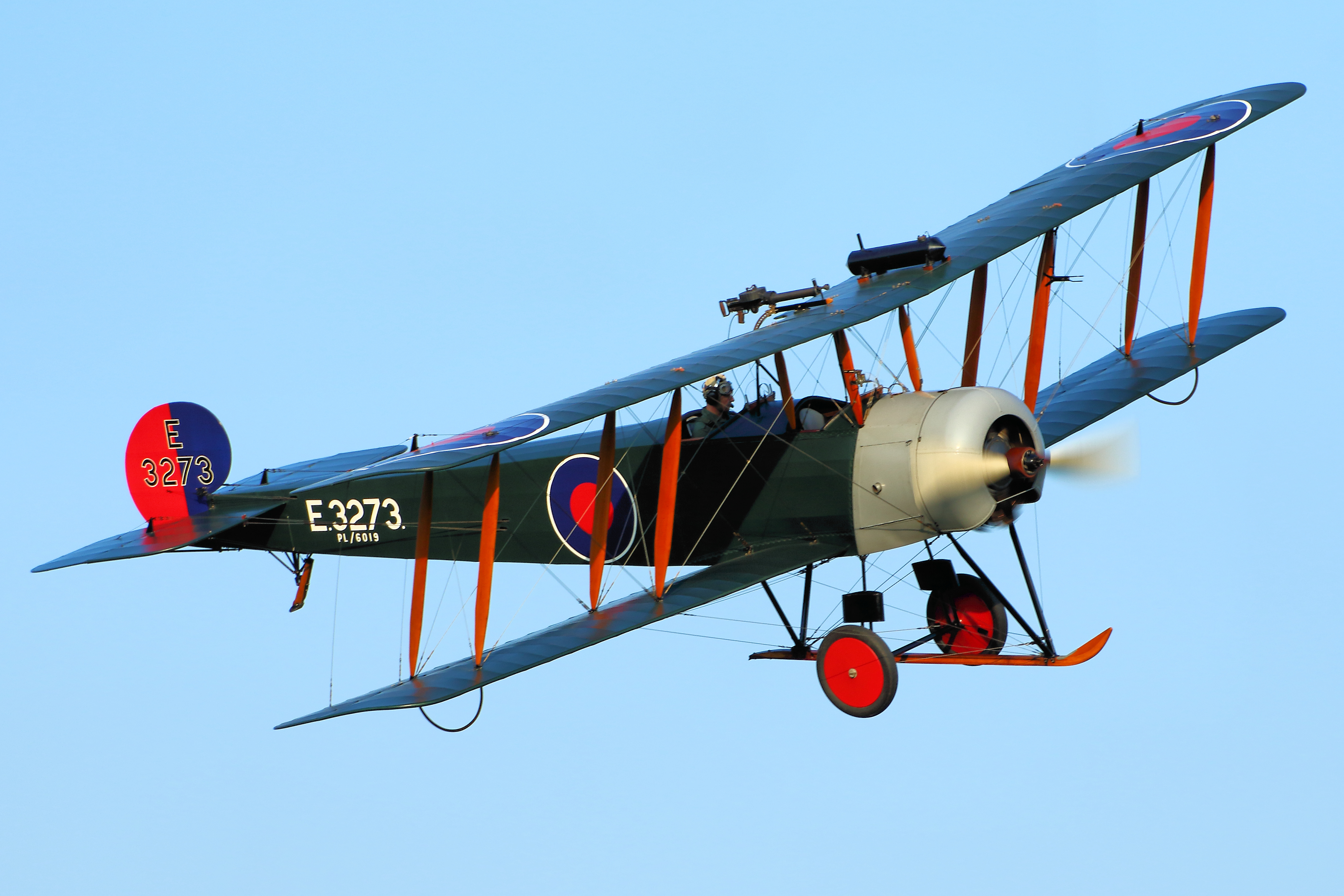

General information
- Type: Trainer, fighter, bomber
- Manufacturer: Avro
- Primary users: Royal Flying Corps Royal Naval Air Service
- Number built: 11,303 including Japanese, Soviet and other foreign production

History
- Manufactured: 1913–1932
- Introduction date: 1913
- First flight: 18 September 1913
- Retired: 1948 Royal Siamese Air Force

The Avro 504 is a single-engine biplane bomber made by the Avro aircraft company and under licence by others. Production began during World War I—with 8,970 built during the conflict—and continued globally for almost 20 years, making it the most-produced aircraft of any kind that served in any military capacity during the First World War. More than 10,000 were built from 1913 until production ended in 1932.

== Design and development ==
Technical drawing

First flown from Brooklands by Fred "Freddie" Raynham on 18 September 1913, powered by an 80 hp (60 kW) Gnome Lambda seven-cylinder rotary engine, the Avro 504 was an evolution of the earlier Avro 500, designed for training and private flying. It was a two-bay all-wooden biplane with a square-section fuselage.

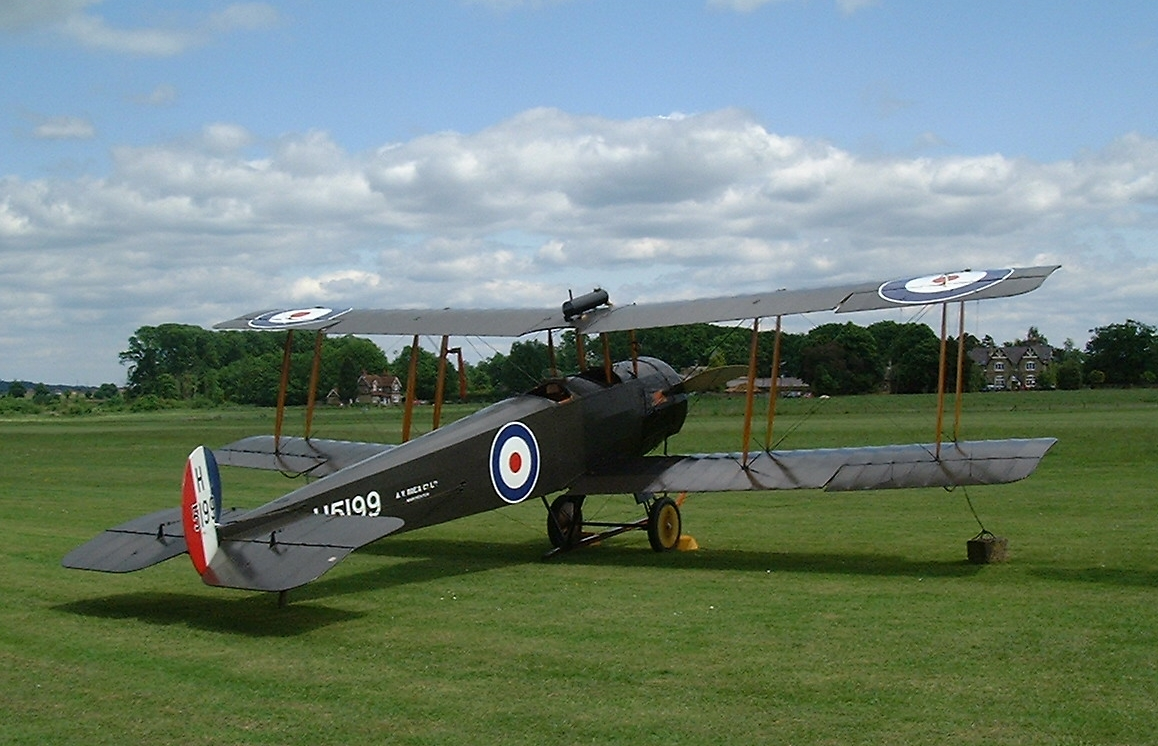
Avro 504K from the Shuttleworth Collection

=== Manufacturers ===
The following companies are recorded as manufacturing the Avro 504 under licence.

- A. V. Roe and Co Ltd., Park Works, Newton Heath, Manchester; and at Hamble Aerodrome, near Southampton, Hants
- Australian Aircraft and Engineering, Sydney, NSW, Australia
- Bleriot and SPAD Aircraft Works, Addlestone
- The Brush Electrical Engineering Co Ltd, Loughborough
- Canadian Aeroplanes Ltd, Toronto, Ontario, Canada
- The Eastbourne Aviation Co Ltd, Eastbourne
- Aero Historic, Parana, Argentina
- Fabrica Militar de Aviones, Cordoba, Argentina
- Frederick Sage and Co Ltd, Peterborough and London
- The Grahame-White Aviation Co Ltd, Hendon Aerodrome, London
- Harland and Wolff Ltd, Belfast
- The Henderson Scottish Aviation Factory, Aberdeen
- Hewlett and Blondeau Ltd, Luton
- Humber Limited, Coventry
- Morgan and Co, Leighton Buzzard
- Nakajima Hikoki Seisaku Sho, Ohta-Machi, Tokyo, Japan
- Parnall & Sons, Bristol
- Regent Carriage, Fulham
- S. E. Saunders Ltd, East Cowes, Isle of Wight
- Savages Ltd, King's Lynn,
- SABCA, Brussels, Belgium
- The Sunbeam Motor Car Co Ltd, Wolverhampton
- TNCA, Balbuena field in Mexico City
- Yokosuka Naval Arsenal, Japan
- KEA, Greece

== Operational history ==
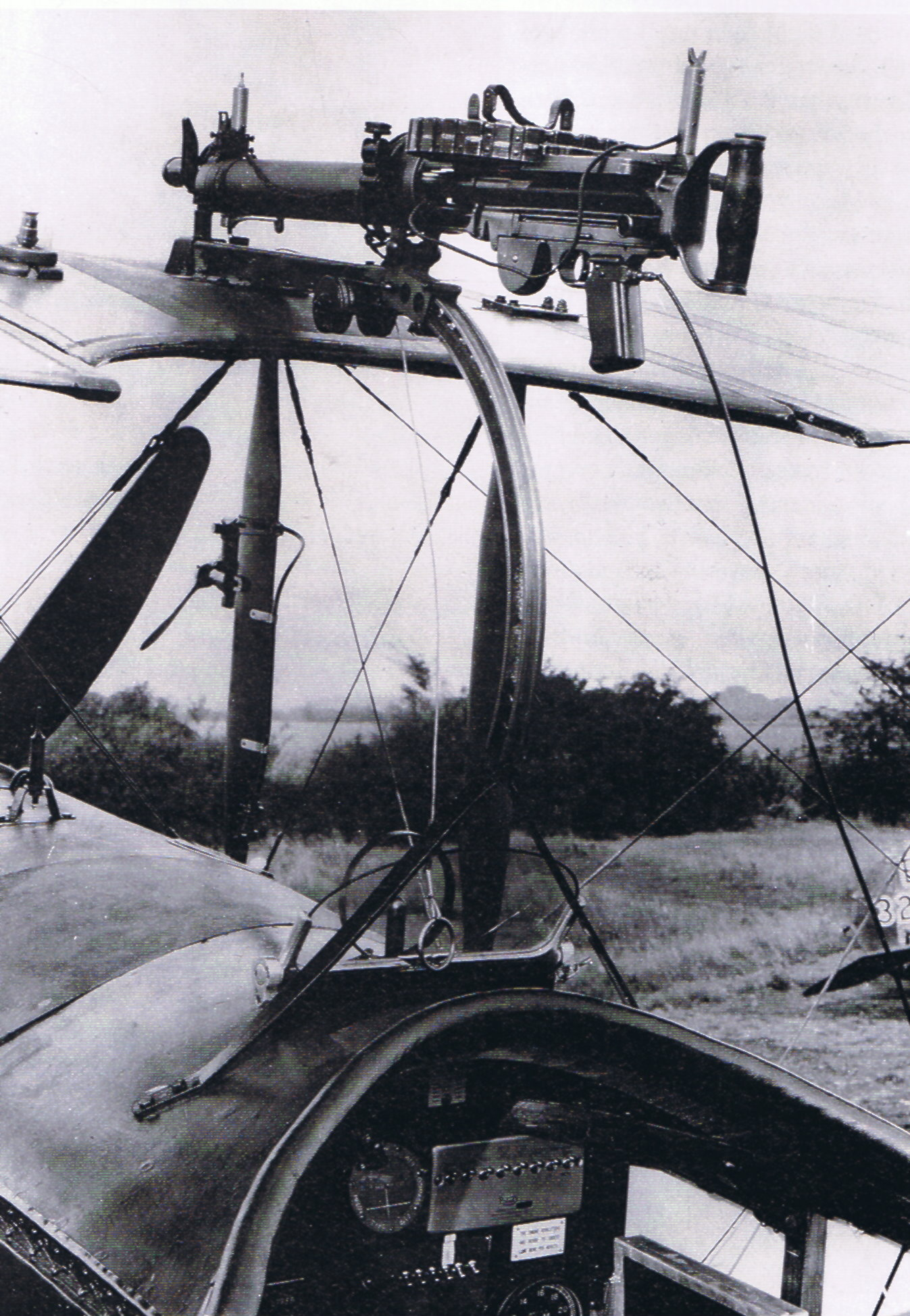
Foster-mounted Lewis gun on night fighter Avro 504K

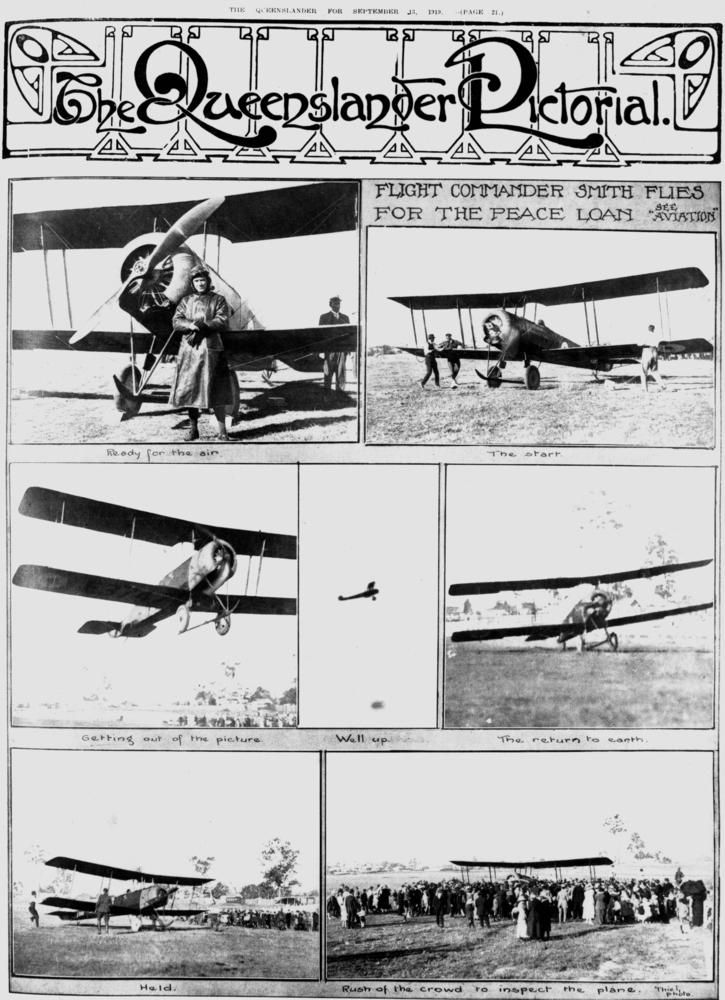
"Flight Commander Smith flies for the Peace Loan" Queenslander Pictorial (1919)

Small numbers of early aircraft were purchased by the Royal Flying Corps (RFC) and the Royal Naval Air Service (RNAS) prior to the start of the First World War, and were taken to France when the war started. One of the RFC aircraft was the first British aircraft to be shot down by the Germans, on 22 August 1914. The pilot was 2nd Lt. Vincent Waterfall and his navigator Lt Charles George Gordon Bayly (both of 5 Sqn RFC) The RNAS used four 504s to form a special flight to bomb the Zeppelin works at Friedrichshafen on the shores of Lake Constance. Three set out from Belfort in north-eastern France on 21 November 1914, carrying four 20 lb (9 kg) bombs each. While one aircraft was shot down, the raid was successful, with several direct hits on the airship sheds and the destruction of the hydrogen generating plant.

Soon obsolete as a frontline aircraft, it came into its own as a trainer, with thousands being built during the war, with the major production types being the 504J and the mass production 504K, designed with modified engine bearers to accommodate a range of engines to cope with engine shortages. 8,340 Avro 504s had been produced by the end of 1918.

In the winter of 1917–18 it was decided to use converted 504Js and 504Ks to equip Home Defence squadrons of the RFC, replacing ageing B.E.2cs, which had poor altitude performance. These aircraft were modified as single-seaters, armed with a Lewis gun above the wing on a Foster mounting, and powered by 100 hp (75 kW) Gnome or 110 hp (82 kW) Le Rhône engines. 274 converted Avro 504Js and Ks were issued to eight home defence squadrons in 1918, with 226 still being used as fighters at the end of the First World War.

Following the end of the war, while the type continued in service as the standard trainer of the RAF, large numbers of surplus aircraft were available for sale, both for civil and military use. More than 300 504Ks were placed on the civil register in Britain. Used for training, pleasure flying, banner towing and even barnstorming exhibitions (as was ongoing in North America following World War I with the similar-role, surplus Curtiss JN-4s and Standard J-1s); civil 504s continued flying in large numbers until well into the 1930s.

The embryonic air service of the Soviet Union, formed just after the First World War, used both original Avro 504s and their own Avrushka (" Little Avro") copy of it for primary training as the U-1 in the early 1920s, usually powered by Russian-made copies of the Gnome Monosoupape rotary engine. This Russian version of the 504 was replaced by what would become the most produced biplane in all of aviation history, the Polikarpov Po-2, first known as the U-2; the type remained in Soviet service till the late 1920s, and much later elsewhere.

Although Avro 504s sold to China were training versions, they participated in battles among warlords by acting as bombers with the pilot dropping hand grenades and modified mortar shells.

The improved, redesigned and radial-engined 504N with a new undercarriage was produced by Avro in 1925. After evaluation of two prototypes, one powered by the Bristol Lucifer and the other by the Armstrong-Siddeley Lynx, the Lynx-powered aircraft was selected by the RAF to replace the 504K. 592 were built between 1925 and 1932, equipping the RAF's five flying training schools, while also being used as communication aircraft. The 504N was also exported to the armed forces of Belgium, Brazil, Chile, Denmark, Greece, Siam and South Africa, with licensed production taking place in Denmark, Belgium, Canada, Siam, Japan and Greece.

The RAF's 504Ns were finally replaced in 1933 by the Avro Tutor, with small numbers continuing in civilian use until 1940, when seven were impressed into RAF service, where they were used for target- and glider-towing.

The 504 was the first British aeroplane to strafe troops on the ground as well as the first British aircraft to make a bombing raid over Germany. It was also the first Allied aeroplane to be downed by enemy anti-aircraft fire and was the first aircraft flown by many future aces, including Billy Bishop.

The 504 is easily recognisable because of the single skid between the wheels, referred to as the "toothpick" in the RAF.

== Variants ==
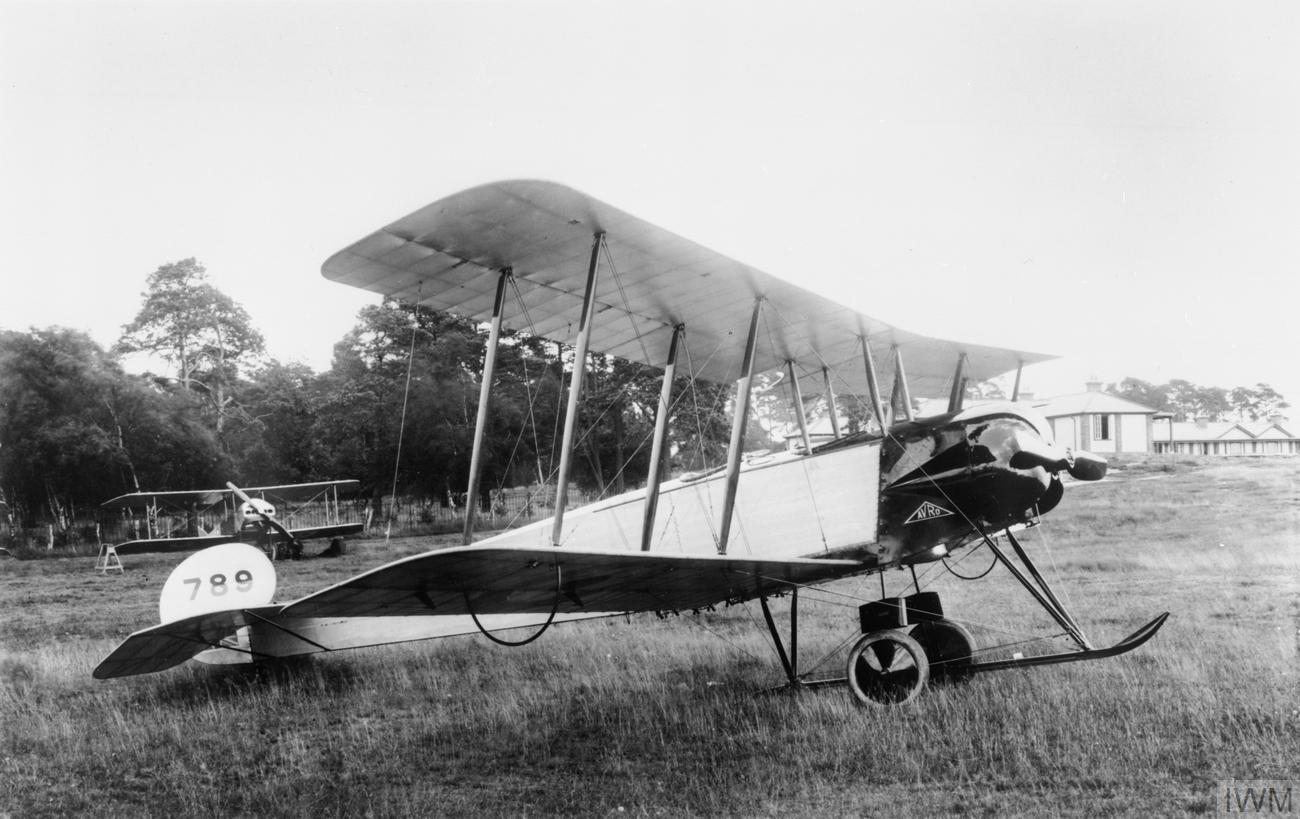
Early 504 with 80 horsepower Gnome Lambda engine

- 504: 80 hp (60 kW) Gnome Lambda engine.

Original model

- 504A:

Modified with smaller ailerons and broader struts. 80 hp (60 kW) Gnome engine.

- 504B

Version for RNAS with larger fin. 80 hp (60 kW) Gnome or Le Rhône engine.

- 504C

Single-seat anti-zeppelin aircraft for the RNAS. The 504C was fitted with an extra fuel tank, in place of the observer.

- 504D

Single-seat anti-zeppelin aircraft for the Royal Flying Corps. Six built.

- 504E

100 hp (75 kW) Gnome Monosoupape engine. Ten built.

- 504F

75 hp (56 kW) Rolls-Royce Hawk engine. One built.

- 504G

Two-seat weapons training variant of the Type 504B for the RNAS. The Avro 504G was intended as a bombing/gunnery trainer, with provision for a Scarff ring mounted on the upper longerons, though the final ten delivered had no provision for a gun. Fitted with one 80 hp Gnome powerplant. 50 built and delivered between June 1917 and January 1918. 30 built by Avro and 20 constructed by The Regent Carriage Company.

- 504H

504C modified for catapult trials. 80 hp (60 kW) Gnome engine.

- 504J

504A modified to mount a 100 hp (75 kW) Gnome engine.

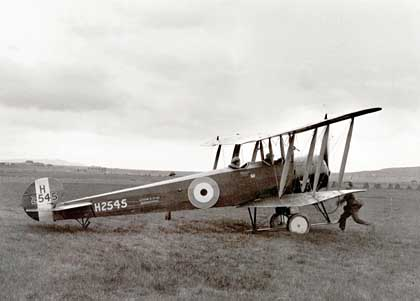
This Avro 504K was the first aeroplane in Iceland, taken there in 1919

- 504K

Two-seat training aircraft. The 504K had a universal mount to take different engines. Single-seat fighter (Comic) conversion used for anti-zeppelin work. Several were assembled in Australia by Australian Aircraft & Engineering. 130 hp (97 kW) Clerget 9B, 100 hp (75 kW) Gnome Monosoupape or 110 hp (82 kW) Le Rhône 9J engines.

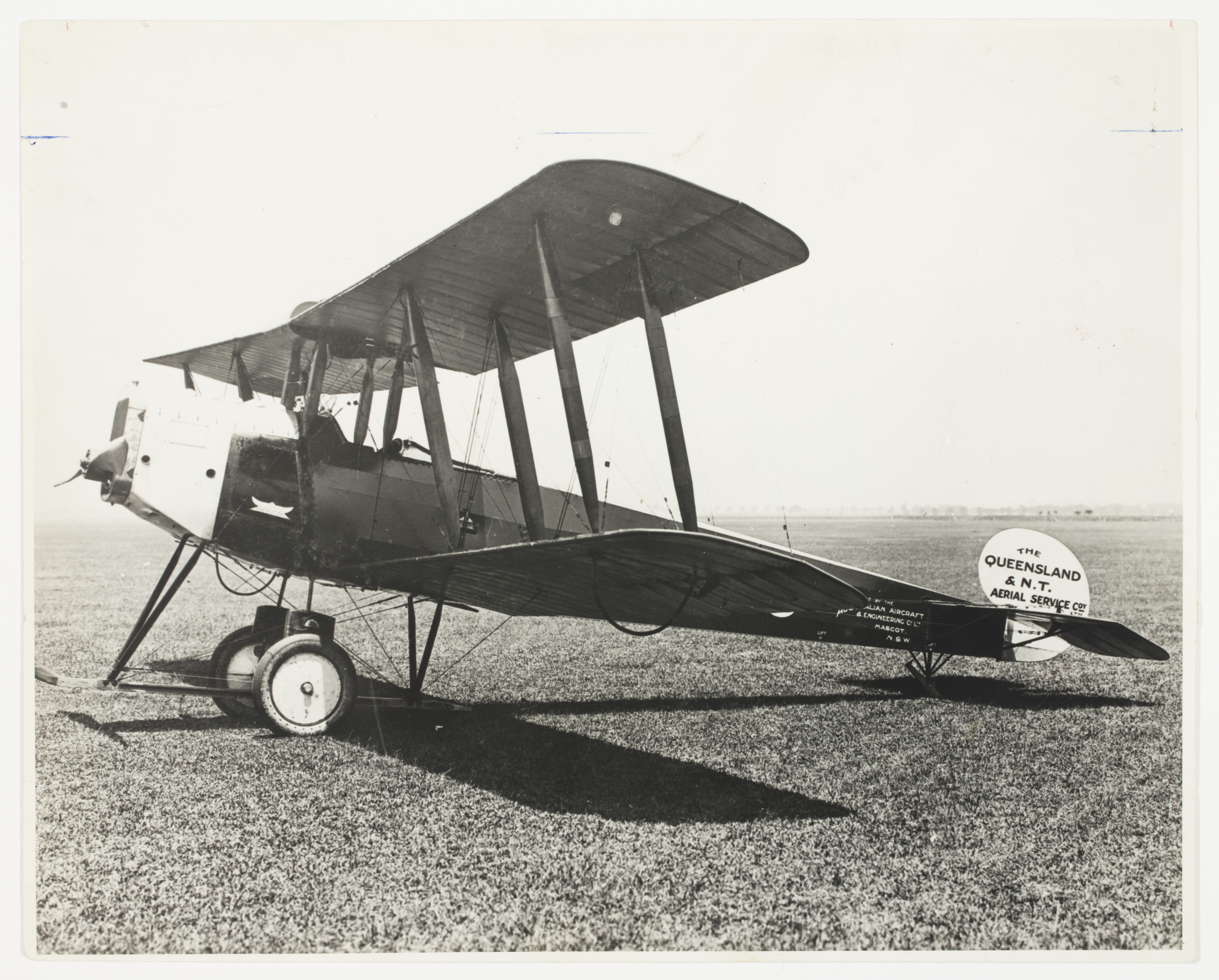
Qantas 504K Dyak (c. 1921)

- 504K Mk.II

Hybrid trainer based on 504K fuselage with 504N undercarriage and wings and powered by rotary engine. Built under licence in Mexico as Avro Anahuac.

- 504L

Floatplane version. 150 hp (110 kW) Bentley BR1, 130 hp (97 kW) Clerget or 110 hp (82 kW) Le Rhône engines.

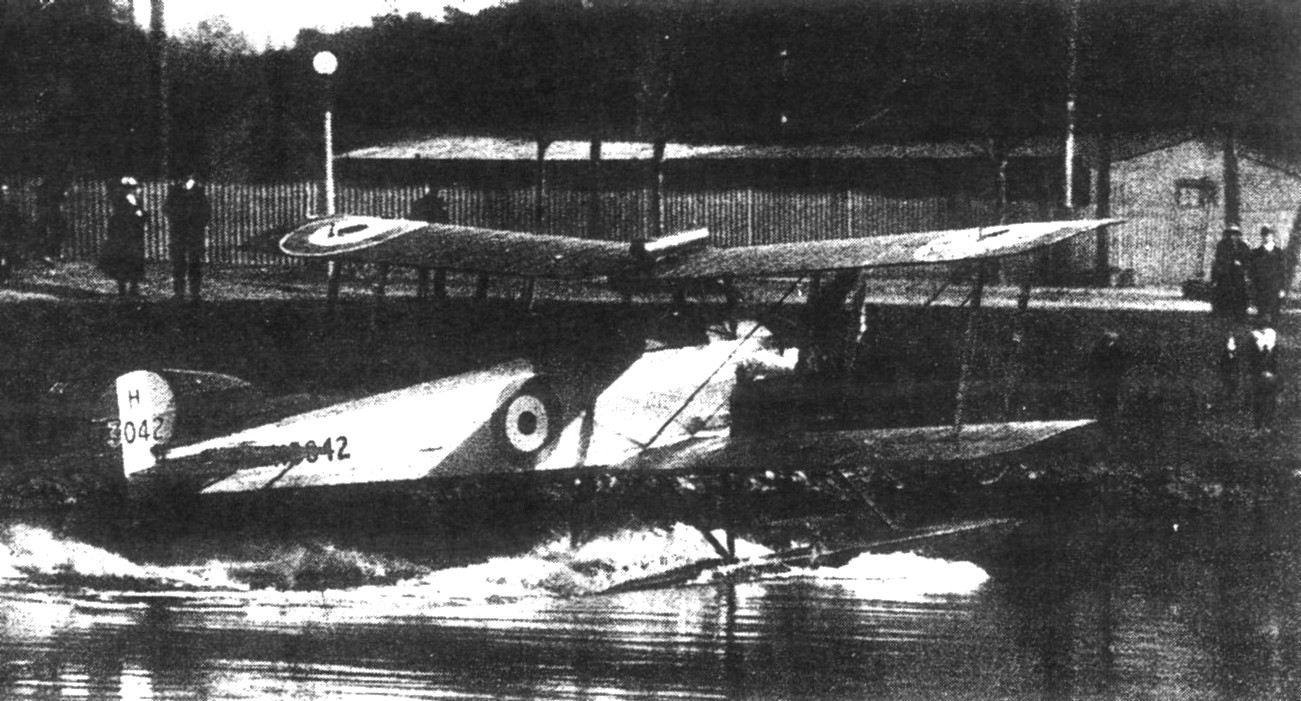
504L floatplane (1920)

- 504M

Three-seat cabin biplane. Only one was ever built. 100 hp (75 kW) Gnome engine.

- 504N

Two-seat training aircraft. Redesigned postwar trainer for RAF with 160 hp (120 kW) Armstrong Siddeley Lynx engine. 598 built.

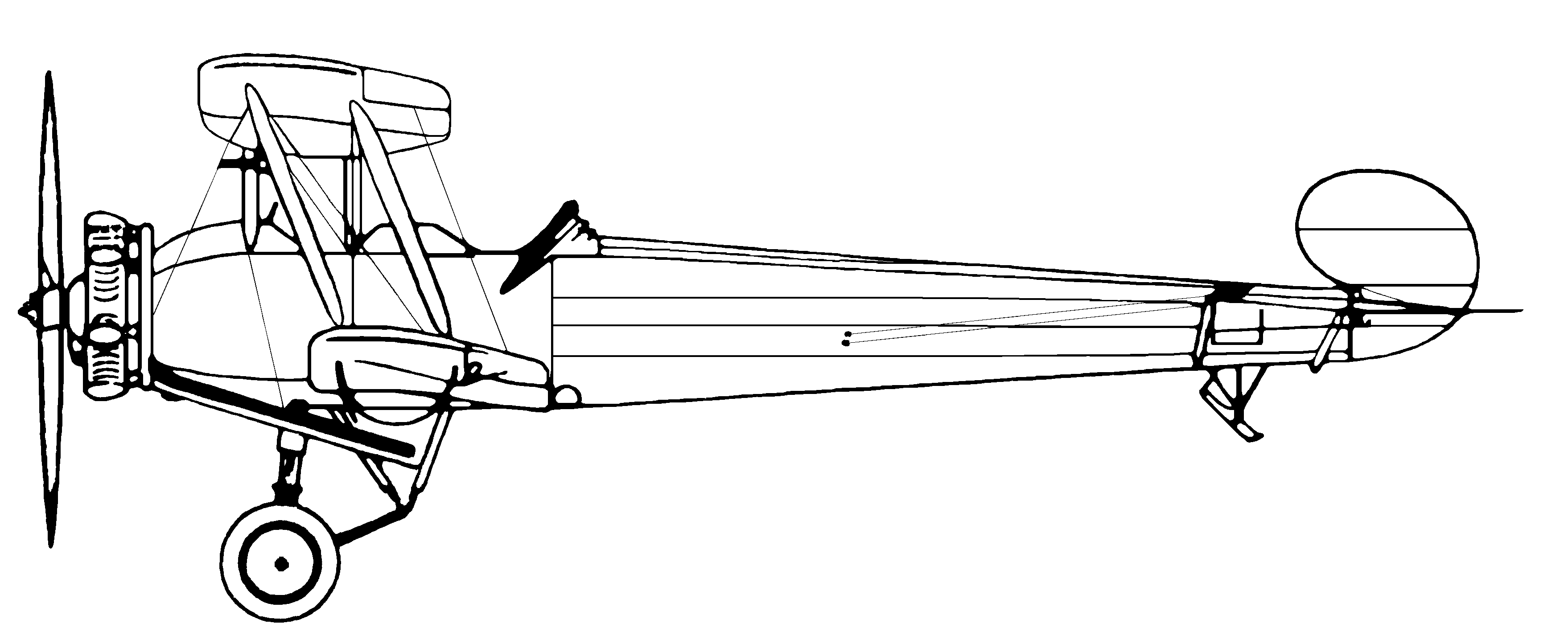
504N left side view

- 504O

Floatplane version of 504N. First aircraft to fly above the Arctic Circle in 1923 Oxford Expedition.

- 504P

Unbuilt version of the 504N with side-by-side seating.

- 504Q

Three-seat cabin biplane. The 504Q was built for the Oxford University Arctic Expedition. Only one was ever built, powered by an Armstrong Siddeley Lynx engine.

- 504R Gosport

Reworked trainer with revised, lightweight structure. Five prototypes flown 1926 to 1927 with various engines (100 hp/75 kW Gnome Monosoupape, 100 hp/75 kW) Avro Alpha, (140 hp/104 kW) Armstrong Siddeley Genet Major and (150 hp/110 kW) Armstrong Siddeley Mongoose), with the Mongoose chosen for production aircraft. Ten were sold to Argentina, with 100 more built by FMA under licence in Argentina. Twelve were exported to Estonia, remaining in service until 1940, and an unknown number to Peru.

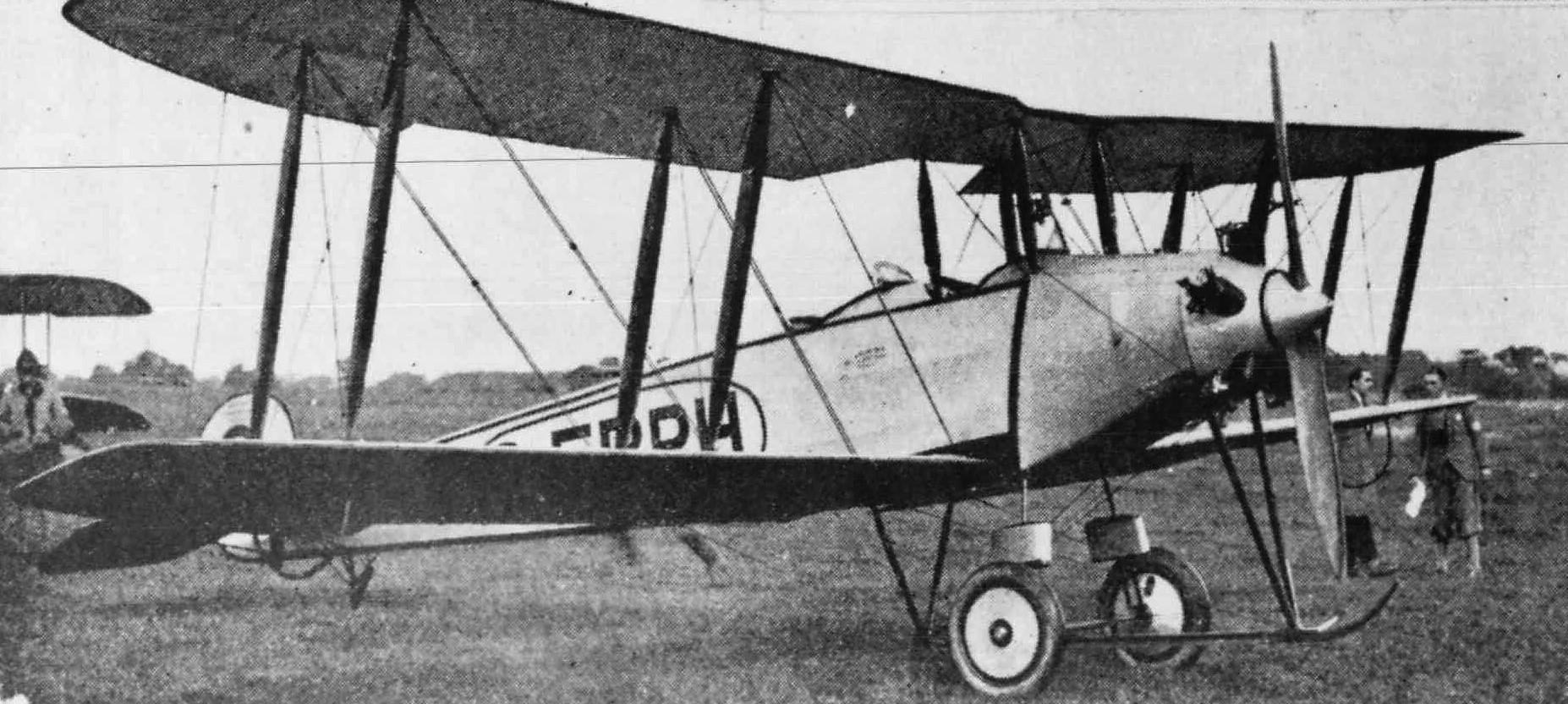
504R Gosport

- 504S

Two-seat training aircraft. Built under licence in Japan by Nakajima.

- 540

Observer training version of 504K for Japan.

- 582

Experimental version of 504N, with new wings of RAF 30 aerofoil section, Frise ailerons on the bottom mainplanes, wing struts reduced to a "K" arrangement and a simplified undercarriage. Converted back to 504N standard in 1928 for Bristol Titan engine test bed.

- 585

504R modified with 504N undercarriage and 90 hp (67 kW) Avro Alpha engine.

- 598 Warregull

Two-seat trainer based on 504N for Australia, not built.

- 599 Warregull II

Redesigned version of Type 598, not built.

- Yokosuka K2Y1

Japanese version of the Avro 504N, given the long designation Yokosuka Navy Type 3 Primary Trainer, powered by a 130 hp (97 kW) Mitsubishi-built Armstrong Siddeley Mongoose radial piston engine, 104 built.

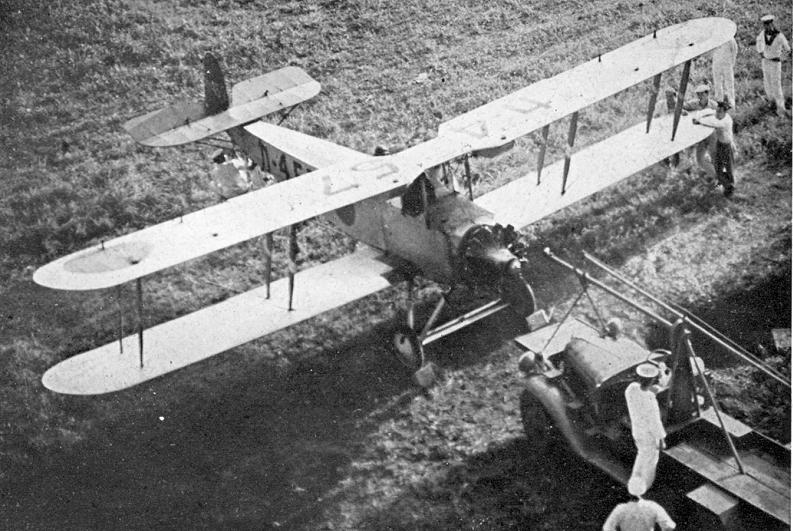
Yokosuka K2Y (1938)

- Yokosuka K2Y2

Improved version of the K2Y1, powered by a 160 hp (120 kW) Gasuden Jimpu 2 radial piston engine. 360 built (K2Y1 and K2Y2). Watanabe built aircraft were given the long designation Watanabe Navy Type 3-2 Land-based Primary Trainer.

- U-1 (Uchebnyi – 1) Avrushka

Russian copy of the 504K. Over 700 built.

- MU-1 (Morskoy Uchebnyi – 1)

Russian seaplane version.

- Orlogsværftet Flyvemaskineværksted LB.I – Danish production at the Royal Naval Dockyard (Orlogsværftet)
- I1A

Brazilian Navy designation of the 504K.

- I2A

Brazilian Navy designation of the 504N and 504O.

- B.F.4

(Thai: บ.ฝ.๔) Royal Siamese Air Force designation for the 504N.

== Operators ==
Afghanistan

- Afghan Air Force

Argentina

- Argentine Army Aviation Service – purchased 10 directly from Avro, with a further 34 license-built by FMA from 1928 to 1937. In service until 1938. (Note: The 504 is listed in several sources as having been used by the Argentine Air Force. This is because its predecessor, the Army Aviation Service, was established in 1912 and dissolved in 1945 when the Air Force was created.)

Australia

- Australian Flying Corps
  - No. 5 (Training) Squadron in the United Kingdom
  - No. 6 (Training) Squadron in the United Kingdom
  - No. 7 (Training) Squadron in the United Kingdom
  - No. 8 (Training) Squadron in the United Kingdom
  - Central Flying School AFC at Point Cook, Victoria
- Royal Australian Air Force
  - No. 1 Flying Training School RAAF at Point Cook
- Western Australian Airways
- Qantas (Queensland And Northern Territory Aerial Service)

Belgium

- Belgian Air Force purchased 50 British-built 504Ks from 1920 to 1922, with a further 27 being built under license by SABCA These were replaced by the 504N, 17 being built by Avro in 1929–31, and 31 being built under license.

Bolivia

- Bolivian Air Force 11 Avro 504R Gosport

Brazil

- Brazilian Air Force
- Brazilian Naval Aviation

Canada

- Royal Canadian Air Force

Chile

- Chilean Air Force
- Chilean Navy

(Taiwan) Republic of China

- Chinese Nationalist Air Force

China-Puppet

- Military Aviation of the Peacebuilding Army operated at least one in the trainer role.

Denmark

- Royal Danish Air Force
- Royal Danish Navy

Estonia

- Estonian Air Force

Finland

- Finnish Air Force

Greece

- Hellenic Air Force
- Hellenic Navy

Guatemala

- Guatemalan Air Force

British India
Iran

- Imperial Iranian Air Force

Ireland

- Irish Air Service
- Irish Air Corps

Japan

- Imperial Japanese Navy Air Service

Latvia

- Latvian Air Force
- Aizsargi

Federated Malay States
Mexico

- Mexican Air Force
  - Models made in Mexico were called "Avro Anáhuac"

Mongolia

- Mongolian People's Army Air Corps

Netherlands

- Dutch Army Aviation Group –
- Royal Netherlands East Indies Army Air Force

New Zealand

- New Zealand Permanent Air Force

Norway

- Norwegian Army Air Service

Peru

- Peruvian Air Force

Poland

- Polish Air Force – 1 Avro 504K (captured from the Soviets in 1920).

Portugal

- Portuguese Air Force
- Portuguese Navy

Russian Empire

- Imperial Russian Air Service

South Africa

- South African Air Force

Soviet Union

- Soviet Air Force – With original British-built examples, and Soviet built U-1 Avrushka copy.

Kingdom of Spain

- Spanish Navy
- Spanish Republican Navy

Sweden

- Swedish Air Force
- Swedish Navy

Switzerland

- Swiss Air Force

Siam (Thailand)

- Royal Siamese Air Force – 40 Avro 504N (at least).
- Royal Thai Navy

Turkey

- Turkish Air Force – Two aircraft

United Kingdom

- Royal Flying Corps
- Royal Air Force
- Royal Naval Air Service

United States

- American Expeditionary Force
- United States Army Air Service

Uruguay

- Uruguayan Air Force

== Surviving aircraft and replicas ==
Australia

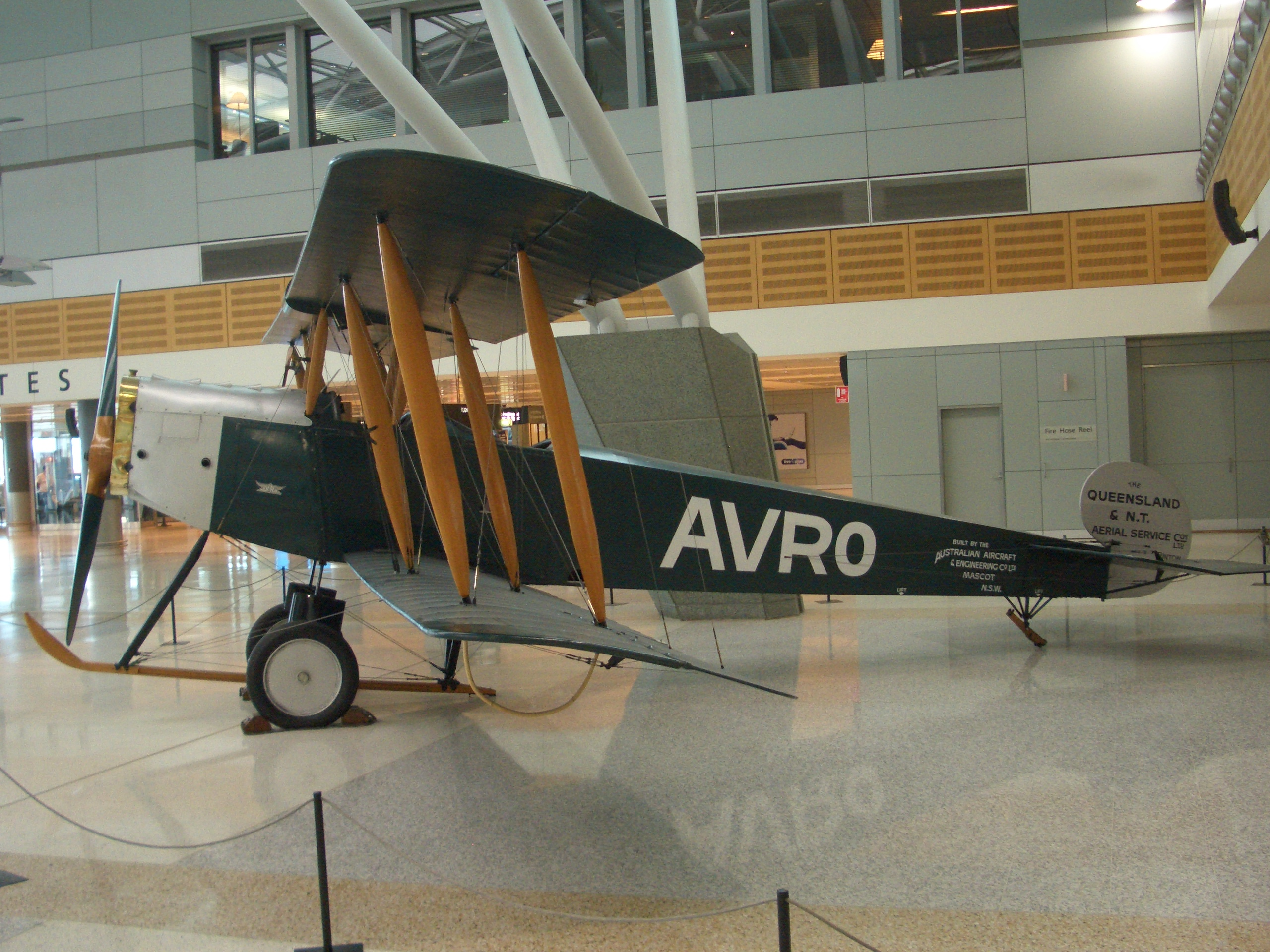
Qantas Avro 504K replica with Sunbeam engine displayed at Qantas Domestic Terminal

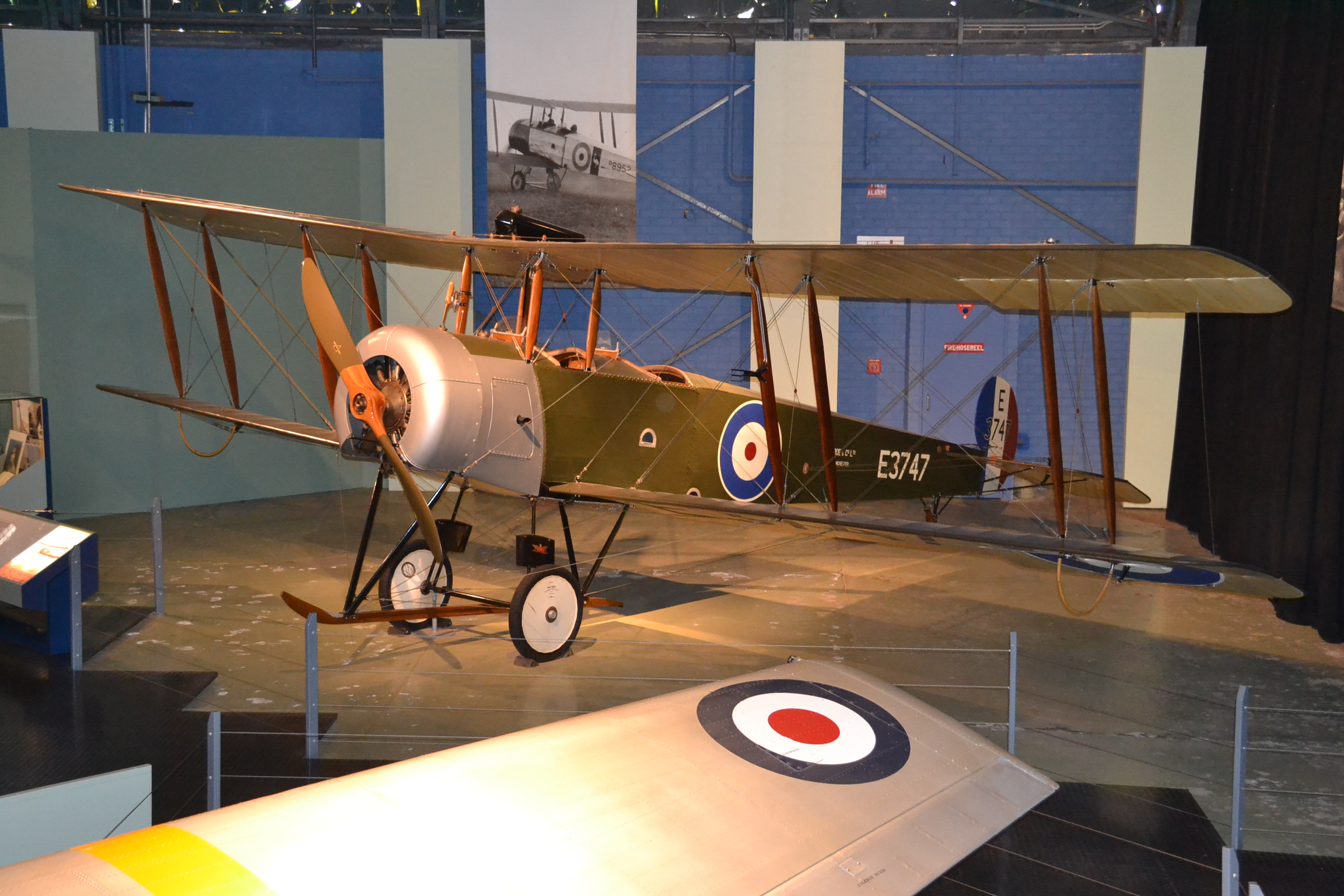
Replica Avro 504K on display at RAAF Museum.

- A3-4 – 504K on static display at the Australian War Memorial in Campbell, Australian Capital Territory. It was initially given the serial number H2174 before being sent to Australia in 1918–19. It was donated to the memorial in August 1929. It was loaned to Qantas in 1965 and restored to resemble the first Qantas aircraft. It was restored to original condition and returned to the Australian War Memorial in 1987.
- Replica – 504K on static display at the Qantas Founders Museum in Longreach. Built in 1988, it is marked as G-AUBG and represents the first Qantas Avro 504K.
- Replica – 504K on static display at the Sydney Airport in Sydney. Built in 1988, it is marked as G-AUBG and represents the first Qantas Avro 504K.
- Replica – 504K on static display at the RAAF Museum in Point Cook, Victoria. It uses an original engine, fittings, and instruments and is marked as E3747.

Canada

- H2453 – 504K on static display at the Canada Aviation and Space Museum in Ottawa, Ontario. It was previously registered as G-CYFG and before that owned by Cole Palen.
- Replica – 504K on static display at the Base Borden Military Museum at CFB Borden near Angus, Ontario. It is on loan from the Canada Aviation and Space Museum, was previously registered as G-CYCK, and before that was owned by J.S. Appleby.

Finland

- AV-57 – 504K in storage at the Finnish Airforce Museum in Tikkakoski, Jyväskylä.

New Zealand

- A202 – 504K airworthy at The Vintage Aviator in Masterton, Wellington. It was purchased by the New Zealand Permanent Air Force in 1925, and subsequently operated as a civilian aircraft.

Norway

- Unknown – 504K on static display at the Norwegian Aviation Museum in Bodø, Nordland. It was in service from July 1921 to 1928 and has been on display at the museum since 1995. It is painted with the registration number 103, which belonged to 504A that crashed in 1919.

Russia

- Replica – 504K airworthy in Russia. It was previously on display at the Military Aviation Museum in Virginia Beach, Virginia. It has been given the serial number "H5991" and is painted in Royal Flying Corps colors.

United Kingdom

- BK892 – 504K airworthy at the Shuttleworth Collection in Old Warden, Bedfordshire. It was originally given the serial number H5199, but was converted to a 504N and sold into civilian ownership. However, it was later impressed into RAF service during World War II as a glider tug, at which point it was given a new serial number. Again returned to civilian use after the war, it was used in the filming of Reach for the Sky.
- D7560 – 504K on static display at the Science Museum in London.
- H2311 – 504K on static display at the Museum of Science and Industry in Manchester.
- Composite – 504K on static display at the Royal Air Force Museum London in London. It is made up of the fuselage of G-EBJE and the wings of G-EBKN.
- Replica – 504K on static display at the Brooklands Museum in Weybridge, Surrey. Marked as G-AACA, it was originally built as a taxiable replica for the 1970s BBC TV series 'Wings'; later acquired by the RAF Museum, Hendon and stored at RAF Henlow then loaned to Brooklands Museum c.1987. Later donated to Brooklands Museum, fitted with an original rotary engine and restored to represent one of two 504s used by the Brooklands School of Flying in the late 1920s and early 1930s.
- Replica – 504J on static display at Solent Sky in Southampton, Hampshire. It is marked as C4451 and was built by ADJ, BAPC No 210.
- Replica-504K built by Pursang in Argentina in 2010, bought by Eric Vernon-Roe, grandson of Alliot Vernon-Roe, founder of Avro, and then to the UK. Registered as G-EROE, it displays with the Great War Display Team.

United States

- A201 – 504 under restoration at Blue Swallow Aircraft in Earlysville, Virginia.
- Replica – 504 under construction at Blue Swallow Aircraft in Earlysville, Virginia
- Replica – 504K on static display at the National Museum of the United States Air Force in Dayton, Ohio. It was built in 1966–1967 by the Royal Canadian Air Force's Aircraft Maintenance & Development Unit and arrived at the museum in May 2003. It was previously registered as G-CYEI.

== Specifications (Avro 504K) ==
Dimensioned drawing of Russian Avro 504K copy known as Avrushka (Little Avro) U-1/MU-1 (reverse engineered by Sergey Ilyushin c. 1923)

Data from The Encyclopedia of World Aircraft, and Jane's Fighting Aircraft of World War I

General characteristics

- Crew: 2
- Length: 29 ft 5 in (8.97 m)
- Wingspan: 36 ft 0 in (10.97 m)
- Height: 10 ft 5 in (3.18 m)
- Wing area: 330 sq ft (31 m^{2})
- Empty weight: 1,231 lb (558 kg)
- Gross weight: 1,829 lb (830 kg)
- Fuel capacity: 25.5 imp gal (31 US gal; 116 L) fuel; 6 imp gal (7 US gal; 27 L) castor oil
- Powerplant: 1 × Le Rhône 9J 9-cylinder air-cooled rotary piston engine, 110 hp (82 kW)
- Propellers: 2-bladed Avro fixed-pitch wooden propeller, 9 ft 0 in (2.74 m) diameter 8 ft 8 in (2.6 m) pitch

Performance

- Maximum speed: 95 mph (153 km/h, 83 kn) at sea level

87 mph (76 kn; 140 km/h) at 8,000 ft (2,400 m)
85 mph (74 kn; 137 km/h) at 10,000 ft (3,000 m)

- Cruise speed: 74 mph (119 km/h, 64 kn) at 75% power at 8,000 ft (2,400 m)

71 mph (62 kn; 114 km/h) at 75% power at 10,000 ft (3,000 m)

- Stall speed: 40 mph (64 km/h, 35 kn)
- Range: 250 mi (400 km, 220 nmi)
- Endurance:

- 2 hours at sea level at maximum speed
- 2 hours 8 minutes at 8,000 ft (2,400 m) at maximum speed
- 3 hours at 10,000 ft (3,000 m) at maximum speed
- 3 hours 42 minutes at 8,000 ft (2,400 m) at cruise speed
- 4 hours 15 minutes at 10,000 ft (3,000 m) at cruise speed

- Service ceiling: 16,000 ft (4,900 m)
- Rate of climb: 700 ft/min (3.6 m/s)
- Time to altitude:

- 3,500 ft (1,100 m) in 5 minutes
- 8,000 ft (2,400 m) in 10 minutes
- 10,000 ft (3,000 m) in 16 minutes

- Wing loading: 5.54 lb/sq ft (27.0 kg/m^{2})
- Power/mass: 0.06 hp/lb (0.099 kW/kg)

Armament
1 fixed .303 Lewis atop upper wing (single-seat night fighter variants)

== See also ==
- German language page on the Soviet-produced U-1 Avrushka
- Sempill Mission

Related development

- La Cierva C-6

Aircraft of comparable role, configuration, and era

- Curtiss JN-4
- Polikarpov U-2, the Soviet U-1 Avrushka's replacement (late 1920s)
- Standard J

Related lists

- List of interwar military aircraft
- List of aircraft of the Royal Flying Corps
- List of aircraft of the Royal Air Force
- List of aircraft of the Spanish Republican Air Force

== Bibliography ==
- Andersson, Lennart (July 1998). "Histoire de l'aéronautique persane, 1921–1941: La première aviation du Chah d'Iran" [History of the Persian Air Force, 1921–1941: The First Aircraft of the Shah of Iran]. Avions: Toute l'aéronautique et son histoire (in French). No. 76. pp. 2–12. ISSN 1243-8650.
- Bruce, J. M. (9 July 1954). "The Avro 504: Historic Military Aircraft No. 8, Part I" (pdf). Flight. pp. 41–44.
- Bruce, J. M. (16 July 1954). "The Avro 504: Historic Military Aircraft No. 8, Part II" (pdf). Flight. pp. 83–88.
- Bruce, J. M. (1965). Warplanes of the First World War – Fighter, Volume One, Great Britain. London: Macdonald.
- Donald, David, ed. (1997). The Encyclopedia of World Aircraft. Aerospace Publishing. ISBN 1-85605-375-X.
- Gerdessen, Frederik (April–July 1982). "Estonian Air Power 1918 – 1945". Air Enthusiast. No. 18. pp. 61–76. ISSN 0143-5450.
- Holmes, Tony (2005). Jane's Vintage Aircraft Recognition Guide. London: Harper Collins. ISBN 0-00-719292-4.
- Jackson, A. J. (1990) [1965]. Avro Aircraft since 1908 (Second ed.). London: Putnam. ISBN 0-85177-834-8.
- Klaauw, Bart van der (March–April 1999). "Unexpected Windfalls: Accidentally or Deliberately, More than 100 Aircraft 'arrived' in Dutch Territory During the Great War". Air Enthusiast. No. 80. pp. 54–59. ISSN 0143-5450.
- Lopes, Mario C. (November 1999). "Les avions Avro au Portugal: des inconnu aux plus célèbres" [Portuguese Avro Aircraft: From the Unknown to the Most Famous]. Avions (in French). No. 80. pp. 36–41. ISSN 1243-8650.
- Magnusson, Michael (Winter 2007). "FMA : from 1945: The Story of Fabrica Militar de Aviones, Argentina: Part 1". Air-Britain Archive. pp. 155–158. ISSN 0262-4923.
- Mason, Francis K (1992). The British Fighter since 1912. Annapolis, Maryland: Naval Institute Press. ISBN 1-55750-082-7.
- Mason, Francis K (1994). The British Bomber since 1914. London: Putnam Aeronautical Books. ISBN 0-85177-861-5.
- Mikesh, Robert C.; Shorzoe Abe (1990). Japanese Aircraft 1910–1914. London: Putnam. ISBN 0-85177-840-2.
- Owers, Colin (1991). "Australian 504s". Air Enthusiast. No. 44. pp. 62–69. ISSN 0143-5450.
- Prins, François (Spring 1994). "Pioneering Spirit: The QANTAS Story". Air Enthusiast. No. 53. pp. 24–32. ISSN 0143-5450.
- Taylor, M. J. H. (ed.). Jane's Encyclopedia of Aviation. Jane's Publishing Company.
- Thomas, Andrew (July–August 2001). "In the Footsteps of Daedulus: Early Greek Naval Aviation". Air Enthusiast. No. 94. pp. 8–9. ISSN 0143-5450.
- Wauthy, Jean-Luc & de Neve, Florian (June 1995). "Les aéronefs de la Force Aérienne Belge, deuxième partie 1919–1935" [Aircraft of the Belgian Air Force]. Le Fana de l'Aviation (in French). No. 305. pp. 28–33. ISSN 0757-4169.
