= Sopwith Wallaby =

British biplane

Wallaby
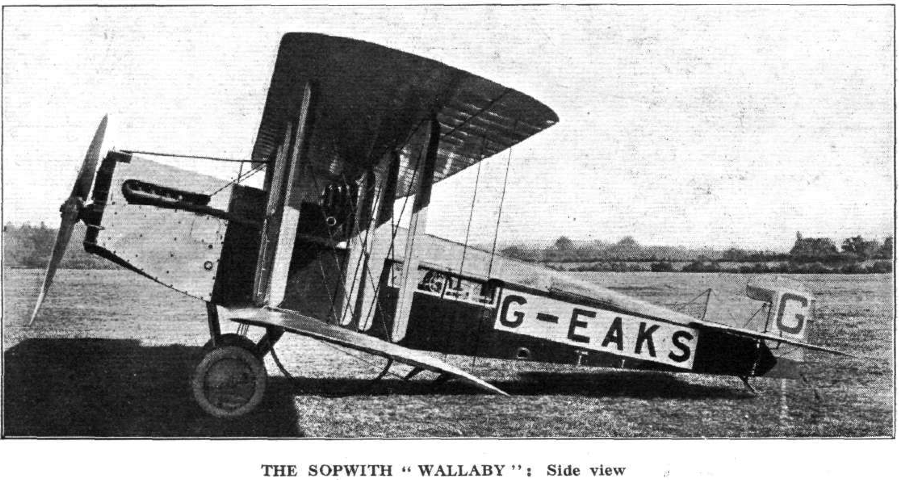
- Sopwith Wallaby G-EAKS, side view

General information
- Type: Long-range transport biplane
- National origin: United Kingdom
- Manufacturer: Sopwith Aviation Company
- Status: crashed, rebuilt as 8-seater transport
- Primary user: Australian Aerial Services
- Number built: 1

History
- First flight: 1919; 107 years ago
- Retired: 17 April 1920; 106 years ago

The Sopwith Wallaby was a British single-engined long-range biplane built during 1919 by Sopwith Aviation Company at Kingston upon Thames.

== Development ==
The Wallaby was designed to compete in an Australian government £10,000 prize for an England to Australia flight. It was a single-engined biplane powered by a Rolls-Royce Eagle VIII engine. It had an open cockpit with two seats that could be retracted inside the enclosed cabin.

== Operational history ==
The Wallaby registered G-EAKS departed Hounslow on 21 October 1919 for Australia. On 17 April 1920 it crashed on the island of Bali in the Dutch East Indies. It was shipped to Australia and re-built as an 8-seater transport and was used by Australian Aerial Services.

== Operator ==
Australia

- Australian Aerial Services

== Specifications ==
Data from Sopwith—The Man and his Aircraft

General characteristics

- Crew: 2
- Length: 31 ft 6 in (9.60 m)
- Wingspan: 46 ft 6 in (14.17 m)
- Height: 10 ft 8 in (3.25 m)
- Wing area: 583 sq ft (54.2 m^{2})
- Empty weight: 2,780 lb (1,261 kg)
- Gross weight: 5,200 lb (2,359 kg)
- Fuel capacity: 200 imp gal (910 L; 240 US gal)
- Powerplant: 1 × Rolls-Royce Eagle VIII water cooled V8 engine, 360 hp (270 kW)
- Propellers: 2-bladed, 12 ft (3.7 m) diameter

Performance

- Maximum speed: 115 mph (185 km/h, 100 kn)
- Cruise speed: 107 mph (172 km/h, 93 kn)

== See also ==
Aircraft of comparable role, configuration, and era

- de Havilland DH.18
