= Charles Cooper (motor manufacturer) =

British motorsport personality

Charles N. Cooper
- Charles Cooper, c.1961
- Born: Charles Newton Cooper; 14 October 1893; Paris, France
- Died: 2 October 1964 (aged 70); Surbiton, United Kingdom
- Citizenship: British
- Occupation: Racing car manufacturer
- Organization: Cooper Car Company
- Spouse: Elsie Cooper (née Paul)
- Children: John Cooper

Charles Newton "Charlie" Cooper (14 October 1893 – 2 October 1964) was a British motorsport mechanic, designer and entrepreneur.

With his son John Cooper he founded the Cooper Car Company, which produced a string of successful racing cars through the 1950s and '60s. While John provided the enthusiasm and vigour that drove the Cooper company forward, it was Charles' shrewd business brain that provided the stability – and profitability – that laid the foundation for their sporting success. Regular works driver Jack Brabham won the World Drivers' Championship in both the 1959 and 1960 Formula One seasons driving the Coopers' revolutionary mid-engined cars, and the Cooper team itself took the World Constructors' Championships. Although they never again achieved the heights of a World Championship, the Coopers' innovative vehicles left a lasting influence on racing car design. Before 1959 all Formula One World Champions had driven front-engined cars; since 1959 no front-engined car has won the World Championship again.

== Early life ==
Charles Cooper was born in Paris, France, in 1893 and spent his early years in France and Spain. He was the son of Charles Renard Cooper, a British travelling actor and theatrical manager. His mother was Franco-Spanish, and died when Cooper was very young. Following his mother's death Cooper's father moved Charles, his twin sister Judy and elder sister Lettie back to his native country, and set up a family home in Malden.

On leaving school, Charles Cooper was taken on as an apprentice at Napier & Son's engineering works in Acton. It was while working at the Napier plant that Cooper got his first taste of motor sport, working on the racing and record-breaking cars of company director and pioneering driver Selwyn Edge. Soon after completing his apprenticeship World War I broke out. Britain declared war on 3 August 1914, and only three weeks later Cooper enlisted in the Royal Army Service Corps. He saw active service throughout the war, invalided home after being gassed during the capture of Valenciennes in late 1918, only weeks before the signing of the Armistice with Germany.

== Inter-war years ==
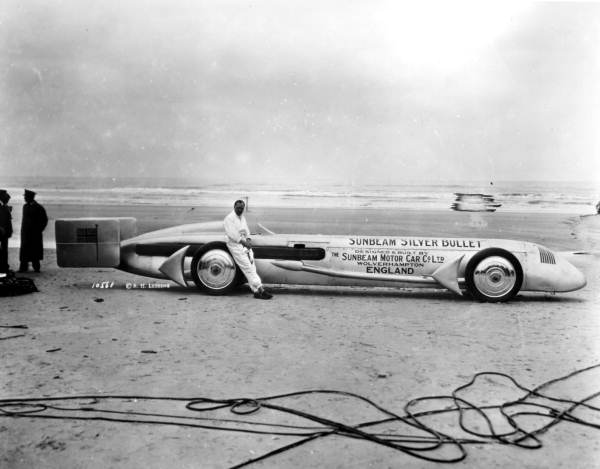
Kaye Don poses beside the Silver Bullet on Daytona Beach in 1930.

During the course of the war Cooper had built a considerable body of experience of practical mechanics on top of his engineering training. Following a short period spent turning a profit by reconditioning war-surplus motorcycles, in 1919 he decided to set up his own garage. He bought a plot of land on Ewell Road in Surbiton, near his family home, and built the business that would form the foundation for his future success. He married Elsie (née Paul) in 1922 and the following year their son, John Cooper, was born.

During the early years after the Great War Cooper's interest in motorcycles and motor sport brought him into contact with another record-breaking pioneer driver, Kaye Don. Cooper gradually became a key part of Don's racing team. In addition to tending to Don's varied stable of MGs and Bugattis, that were regularly raced at Brooklands, Cooper was also involved in the preparation and running of the Sunbeam Silver Bullet, Don's 1930 land speed record challenger. In his spare time, Cooper constructed a midget car for his nine-year-old son, with a custom-made chassis and bodywork, powered by a 175 cc (10.7 cu in) motorcycle engine. He built himself a Flying Flea light aircraft from plans published in Practical Mechanics, and in 1936 he constructed a second special for John, now in his early teenage years, this time based on an Austin 7.

Cooper's Brooklands connections later blossomed into a partnership with Alfa Romeo racer Ginger Hamilton. With Hamilton's assistance, in 1934 Cooper moved his business to new premises about a mile down the road. The new garage and Vauxhall Motors dealership that Cooper built on wasteland behind 243 Ewell Road, which opened onto Hollyfield Road, was to become the heart of the Cooper operation right through its glory years.

== Post World War II ==
During the war years Cooper kept his business afloat by servicing fire engines. However, when John and his friend Eric Brandon returned from their wartime service in 1946 they decided to use the Coopers' garage facilities to build themselves a racing special to the newly issued National 500 cc (30.5 cu in) regulations. This project grew into the mainstay of Charles Cooper's business for the remainder of his life.

Together, the Coopers concocted a simple but effective design, combining all-independent suspension, a lightweight ladder chassis, and a powerful JAP single cylinder motorcycle engine (secured through Cooper's contacts from his motorcycle repair days). John's 500 cc racer, swiftly followed by a second example built for Brandon, proved to be highly competitive and spawned a rush of interested parties keen to purchase a replica for their own use. In 1948 the Coopers and Brandon manufactured 12 of their first production Cooper 500 cars (the Mark II, or T5) for sale to the public, priced at slightly over £500. Among early purchasers was a young Stirling Moss, who later went on to a successful international Formula One career. Prompted by Spike Rhiando the Coopers also produced a slightly lengthened version that would accept the larger, 1,000 cc (61.0 cu in), V-twin version of the JAP engine.

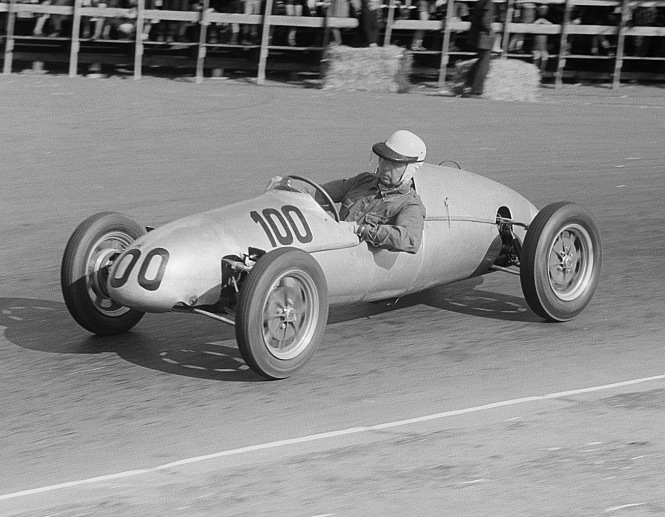
Theo Helfrich drives his new Mark VIII Cooper 500 in 1954

Throughout 1948 Cooper drivers took numerous class wins, race victories and fastest times, and demand grew. Occasionally, in these early years, Cooper himself sometimes drove one of his cars at a race meeting. Although he usually finished well down the order, the blow was softened by the fact that commonly most of the cars finishing ahead of him carried the Cooper badge. The Coopers continued to refine and improve their 500 and 1000 cars for the next decade, with demand boosted still further by the 500's eligibility for the international Formula Three rules introduced in 1950. American driver Harry Schell even entered a Cooper 1000 – fitted with an expanded, 1,100 cc (67 cu in) engine – for the Formula One-level 1950 Monaco Grand Prix. In 1951 the Cooper Car Company, as it had by then become, manufactured 60 of the Mark V version of the racing cars, and had begun to dabble in larger vehicles.

Over the next few years the Coopers, and their new chief designer Owen Maddock, produced cars for many other series. The Cooper Bristol Formula Two cars had some successes, particularly with Mike Hawthorn at the wheel, and the Cooper Bob-tail sports car was frequently unbeatable. Australian racing driver and some-time mechanic Jack Brabham joined the Cooper works team in the mid-1950s, and through his drive and ambition Cooper rapidly began to produce cars that could compete at the highest level. This culminated in Brabham winning the Formula One World Drivers' Championship in 1959 and 1960, with the Cooper marque taking the World Constructors' Championship titles.

Throughout this time, although son John was the Cooper figurehead and works team manager, Charles as managing director provided a steady hand and sound business acumen that kept the Cooper company financially stable. Following a number of years' declining health Charles Cooper died in late 1964, just under two weeks short of his 71st birthday. John found that he was unable to keep the team going by himself and he sold it less than a year later.
