= Cooper Mark II =

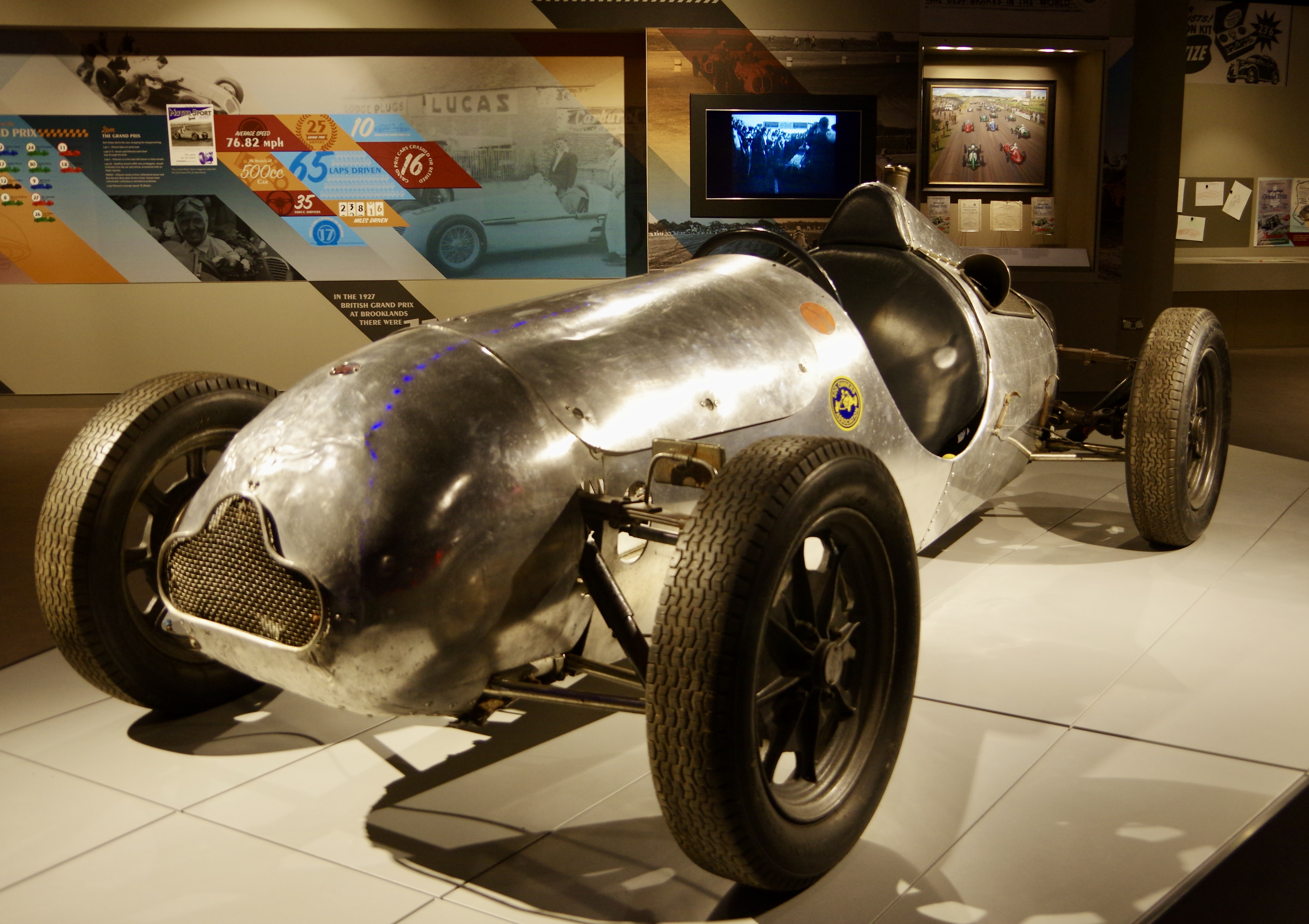
1948 Cooper Mk2 (T5) front

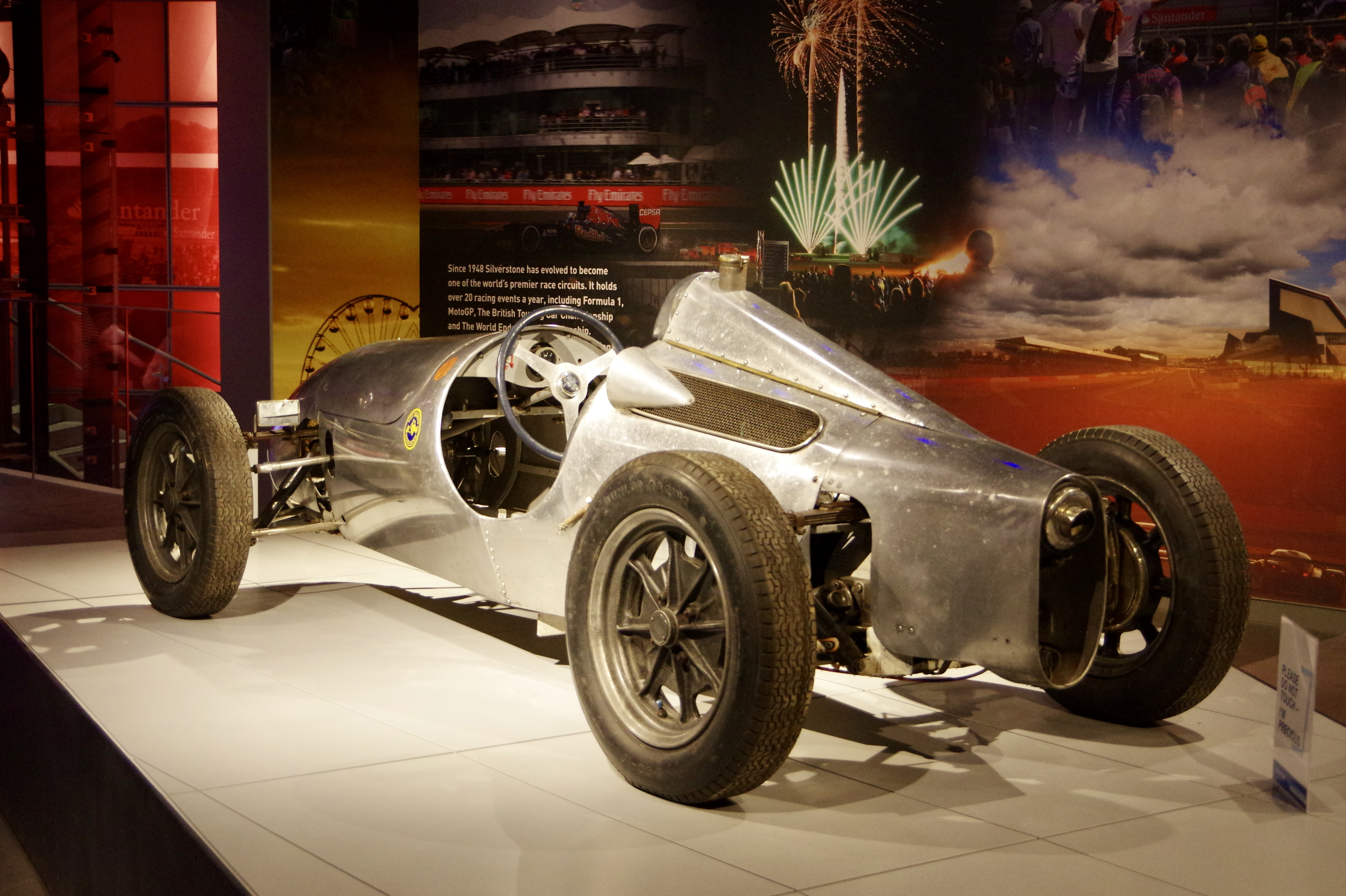
1948 Cooper Mk2 (T5) rear

The Cooper Mark II, also known as the T5 (Type 5), was a 500cc (predecessor to Formula 3) open-wheel racing car designed and built by the Cooper Car Company at Surbiton, Surrey, England, in 1948, and was the first production car made by Cooper. It was a successor to 1946 Cooper 500, which was a prototype. 12 cars were built. It was powered by a 45 hp (34 kW) 500 cc (31 cu in) JA Prestwich Industries (JAP) 4B Speedway single-cylinder engine, but had the option of being converted to a lengthened wheelbase version, to be able to use a 70 hp (52 kW) 1,000 cc (61 cu in) JA Prestwich Industries (JAP) or Vincent-HRD V-twin. It also notably won the first ever Grand Prix at Silverstone in 1948, competing in the 500 cc class, being driven by Spike Rhiando.
