= Sunbeam Manitou =

British aero-engine produced by Sunbeam

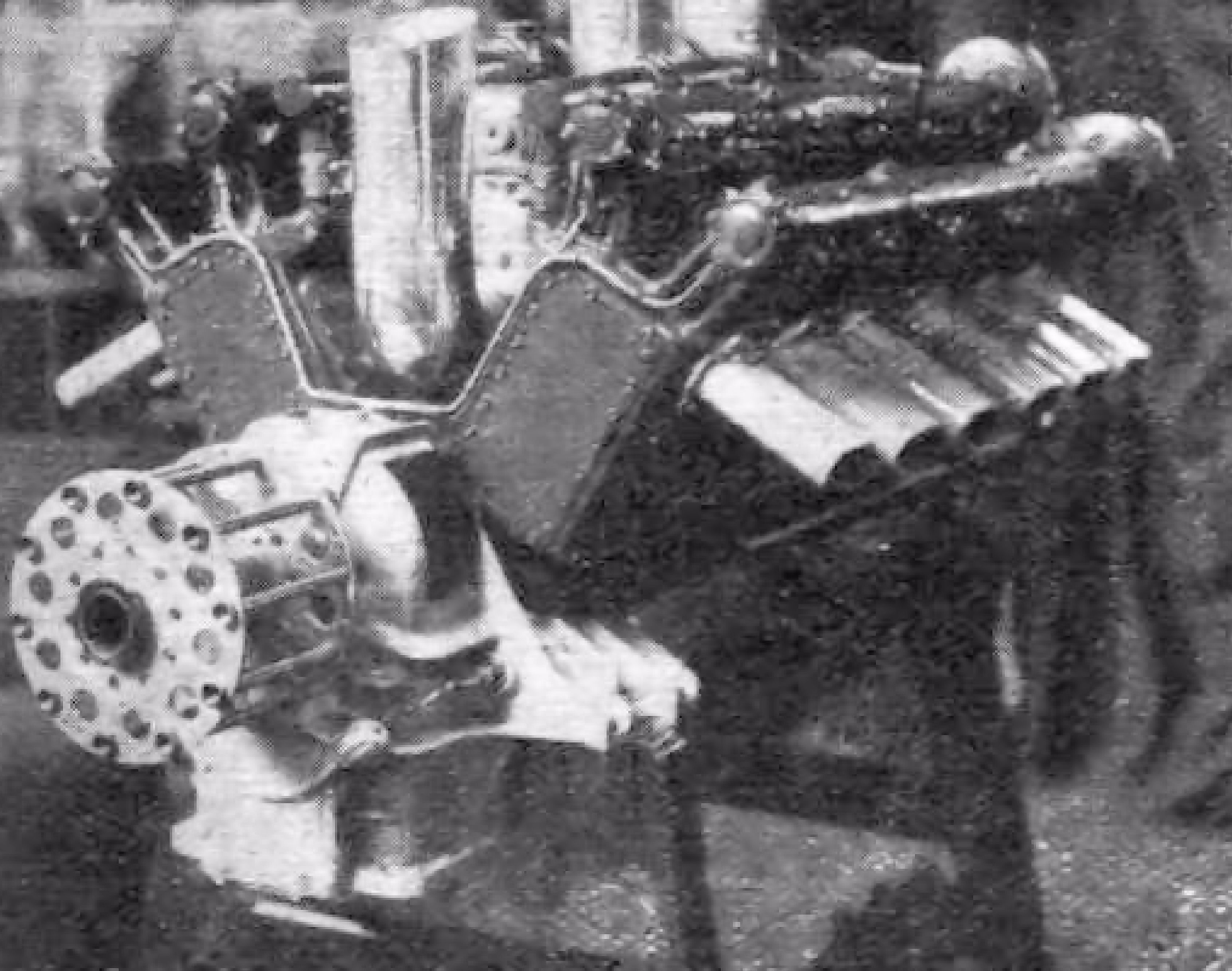
Manitou at the 1919 Paris Aero Salon

The Sunbeam Manitou was an aero-engine produced by Sunbeam. Unsuccessful as an aero-engine, it is best known for having powered the Sunbeam 350HP racing car.

== Development ==
The Manitou was a further development of the V-12 Maori III. Work on it began by Louis Coatalen in 1917. It used aluminium blocks rather than cast iron, cast in blocks of three cylinders, a typical Sunbeam feature. Bore was increased to 110 mm, but stroke remained at 135 mm. The banks were at a 60° vee, with twin overhead camshafts on each bank operating four valves per cylinder. There were two Claudel-Hobson carburettors and two British Thomson-Houston (BTH) ignition magnetos. For aircraft use a reduction gear was fitted. The engine developed 300 hp at 2,000 rpm, later increased to 325 hp.

Only one engine was produced before the end of the First World War, as the factory was busy with the vibration and other problems with the Arab engine, and it was very nearly cancelled. As was not unusual for a Sunbeam engine, it was only ever fitted to a single aircraft for trials, a Short 184 seaplane, and never went into production. After the war and Sunbeam's financial problems in the war-surplus glutted aero-engine market, they were offered to the less-critical powerboat market, again not an unusual move for Sunbeam. During the war 840 had been ordered, but only 13 were delivered before cancellation of the order.

=== Maple Leaf ===
Sunbeam saw the market in racing powerboats as a solution to the post-war glut and weak market. Four were fitted to the boat 'Maple Leaf V' .

== Specifications (Manitou) ==
=== General characteristics ===
- Type: 12-cylinder naturally aspirated liquid-cooled "Vee" piston aircraft engine
- Bore: 110 mm (4.33 inch)
- Stroke: 135 mm (5.31 inch)
- Displacement: 15.395 litre (939.5 cuin)
- Dry weight: 1,050 lb wet
- Designer: Louis Coatalen

=== Components ===
- Valvetrain: Twin overhead camshafts per bank, twin intake and twin exhaust valves per cylinder
- Fuel system: Two Claudel-Hobson HC.7 carburettors
- Cooling system: water
- Reduction gear: 1.54:1

=== Performance ===
- Power output: 300 hp (225 kW) at 2,000 rpm. Later raised to 325 hp

== Sunbeam 350HP ==
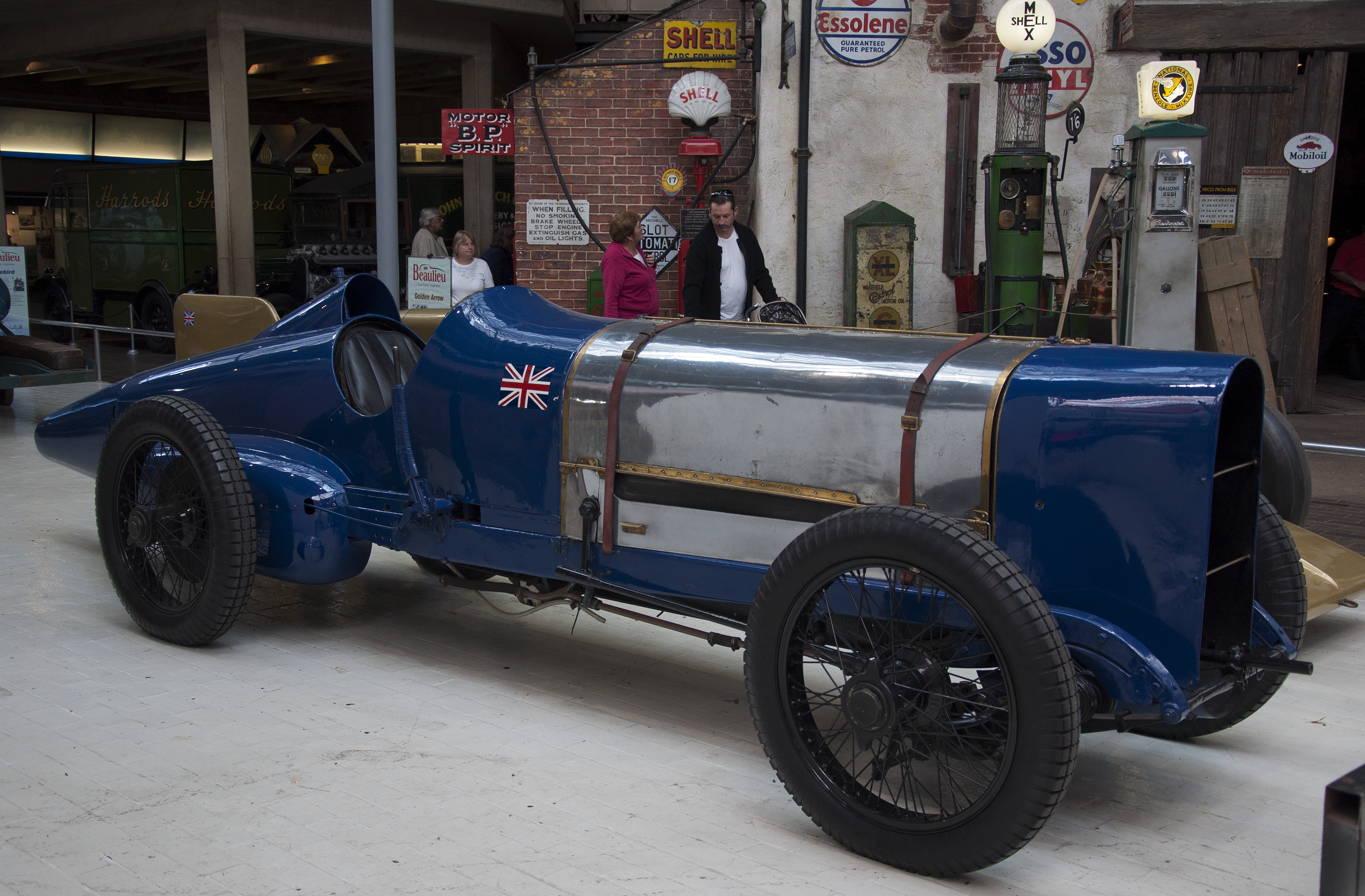
Malcolm Campbell's Blue Bird Sunbeam 350HP

The engine's only noteworthiness came when it was fitted to Sunbeam 350HP racing car in 1920. This car was later bought by Malcolm Campbell, set land speed records and was named to become one of Campbell's Blue Birds.

In typical Coatalen fashion, he redesigned the engine substantially even though this was just a one-off with no other likely sales. The twin-cam four-valve head was replaced by the single-cam three-valve head, possibly from the Arab. An increase in bore to 120 mm allowed space for these larger valves.

Another change affected the stroke, also a technique from the Arab, where it had been responsible for the engine's failure. A multi-cylinder V engine offers little length for connecting rods. Coatalen's usual solution was to use articulated connecting rods, where one rod runs on the crankshaft journal, but the other acts indirectly, through a journal on the other rod. The difficulty is that this gives a slightly different piston stroke for each bank, leading to unbalance and possible vibration problems, as with the Arab. Stroke was thus 135 mm on one bank and 142 mm on the other.

== Specifications ==
=== General characteristics ===
- Type: 12-cylinder naturally aspirated liquid-cooled "Vee" piston aircraft engine
- Bore: 120 mm (4.72 inch)
- Stroke: 135 / 142 mm (5.31 / 5.59 inch)
- Displacement: 18.796 litre (1147 cuin)
- Designer: Louis Coatalen

=== Components ===
- Valvetrain: Single overhead camshaft per bank, single intake and twin exhaust valve per cylinder
- Fuel system: Two Claudel-Hobson HC.7 carburettors
- Cooling system: water

=== Performance ===
- Power output: 355 hp at 2,300 rpm for racing.
- Specific power: 12.3 kW/litre
