= Cooper 500 =

Open-Wheel Racing Car

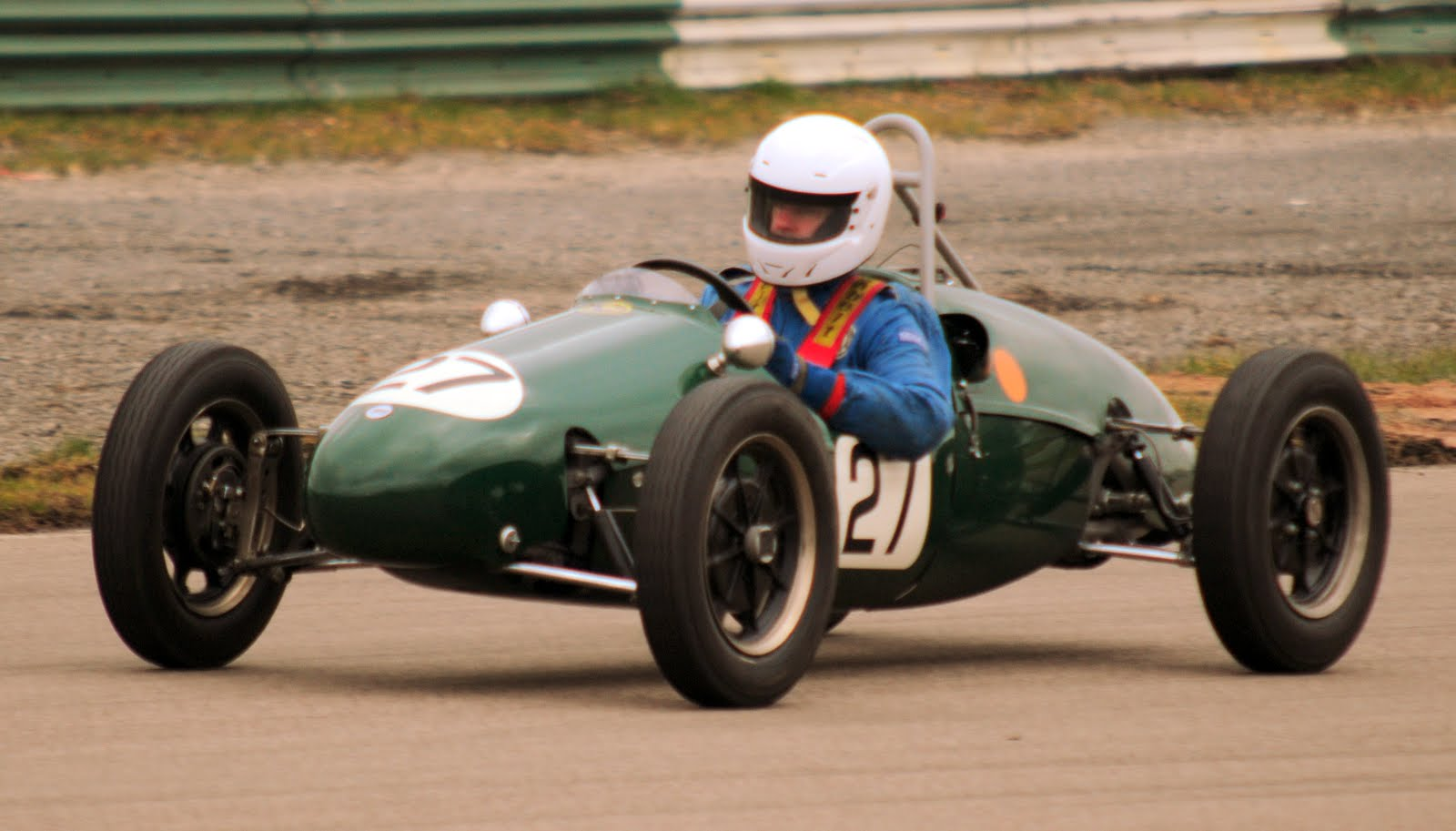
Cooper 500

The Cooper 500, also referred to as the T2/T3 (Type 2/Type 3), was a prototype 500cc (predecessor to Formula 3) open-wheel racing car designed and built by the Cooper Car Company in Surbiton, Surrey, England, and was their first ever car. The first post-war prototypes were built in 1946, shortly after the end of the Second World War. Since materials were in short supply immediately after World War II, the prototypes were constructed using two Fiat Topolino independent front suspension assemblies, these having effectively a double wishbone arrangement, the upper "wishbone" in this case being a transverse leaf spring which provided the suspension spring medium as well as locating the top part of the suspension upright/hub carrier. Fiat Topolinos were manufactured between 1936 and 1955. It was powered by a 45 hp (34 kW) 500 cc (31 cu in) JA Prestwich Industries (JAP) 4B Speedway single-cylinder motorcycle engine, which drives the rear wheels through a Triumph Speed Twin gearbox, via chain. It was succeeded by their first successful production car, the Mk.II, in 1948.
