= Sunbeam 350HP =

Aero engined car

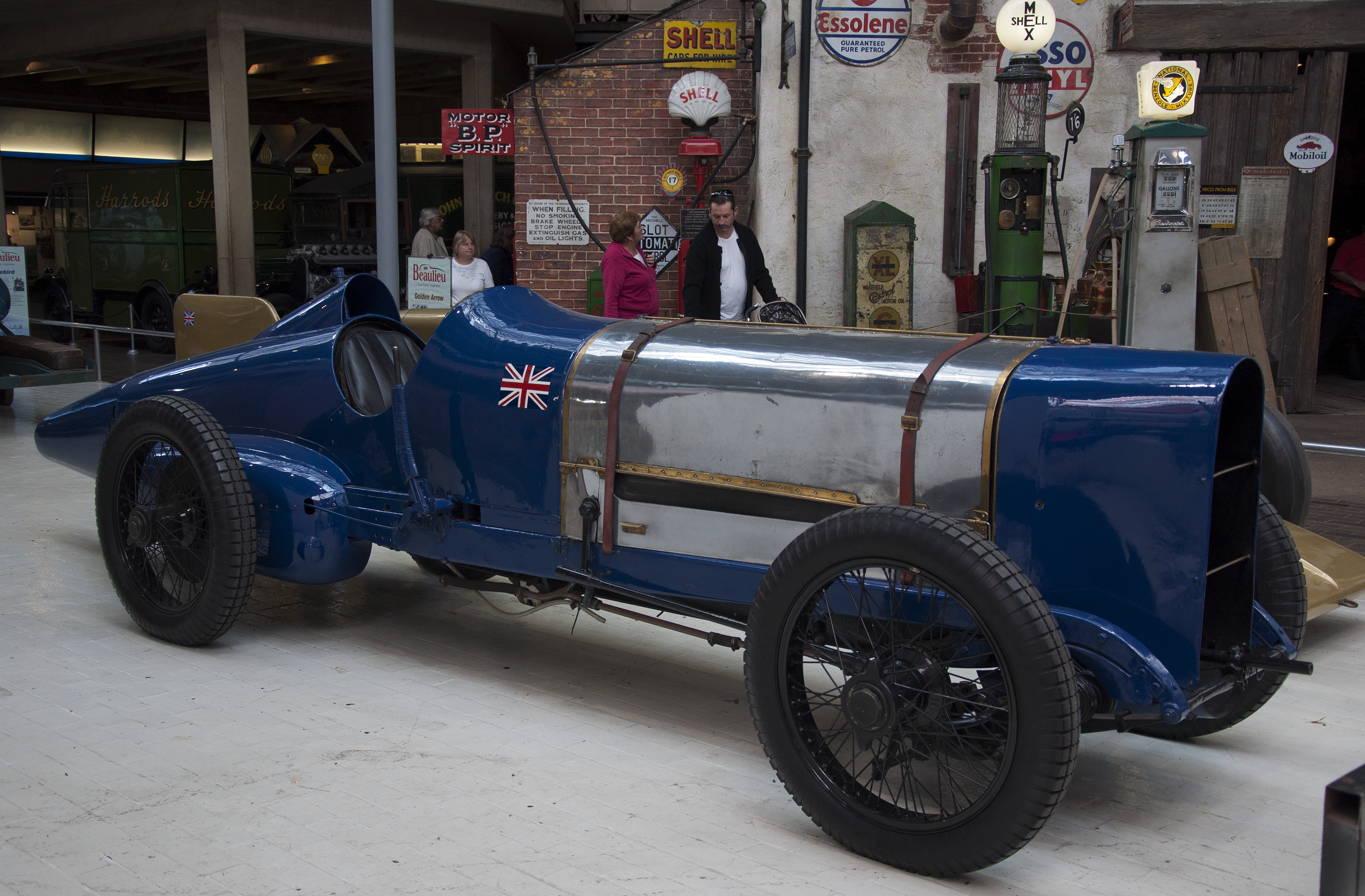
- The Sunbeam 350HP displayed at the National Motor Museum, Beaulieu, 2011

Overview
- Manufacturer: Sunbeam of Wolverhampton
- Production: 1
- Designer: Louis Coatalen

Body and chassis
- Body style: Open wheel racing car

Powertrain
- Engine: 18.8-litre V12 Sunbeam Manitou of 350 hp (260 kW)
- Transmission: 4-speed pre-selector, final drive ratio 1.5:1

Dimensions
- Wheelbase: 10 ft 7 in (3.2 m), track 4 ft 6 in (1.4 m)
- Length: 16 ft (4.9 m)
- Curb weight: 1,550 kg (3,417 lb)

The Sunbeam 350HP is an aero-engined car built by the Sunbeam company in 1920, the first of several land speed record-breaking cars with aircraft engines.

== Design ==
The car was fitted with a purpose built 18.8-litre V12 engine based on a hybrid of the Sunbeam Manitou and Sunbeam Arab aero engines. This engine had four blocks of three cylinders arranged in two banks set at 60 degrees (unlike the Arab which were set at 90 degrees). Each cylinder had one inlet and two exhaust valves actuated by a single overhead camshaft. The two camshafts were driven by a complex set of 16 gears from the front of the crankshaft - a very similar arrangement to that used on the Maori engine which had two OHC per bank of cylinders. A 4-speed transmission initially drove a back axle with differential with a shaft drive rather than the hazardous chains of other cars. Harry Hawker drove the car in 1920 at Brooklands but suffered a burst tyre, spinning off the circuit. The differential was replaced with a simple crown wheel and pinion so that the rear wheels were locked together and it was more successful in the hands of Kenelm Lee Guinness. Brakes were crude, as was usual in the period, with a foot brake acting on the transmission and a hand brake on the rear drums. Suspension was also typical, with half-elliptic springs all round damped by André Hartford friction shock absorbers.

== Racing career ==
The 350HP was first raced at Brooklands in 1920 by Harry Hawker. In October René Thomas set a new record at the Gaillon hill climb.

On 17 April Jean Chassagne lapping at 114 mph won the Brooklands Easter Meeting 13th Lighting Short handicap. In May 1922 Kenelm Lee Guinness set three records with it: the Brooklands lap record at 123.30 mph (198.43 km/h), then the land speed record over a mile at 129.17 mph (207.88 km/h) and over a kilometre at 133.75 mph (215.25 km/h) – this was the last land speed record to be set on the Brooklands track.

=== Blue Bird ===
Malcolm Campbell drove the borrowed car at the Saltburn Speed Trials on 17 June 1922 and broke his first speed record at 138.08 mph (222.22 km/h). However the manual stopwatch timing system was not accepted for an official record.

Campbell persuaded Coatalen to sell the Sunbeam to him, painted it blue and renamed it Blue Bird, already the fourth Blue Bird. 23 June 1923 saw Campbell at Fanø, Denmark, recording another record-breaking speed of 137.72 mph (221.64 km/h) over the flying kilometre. This time the record was not officially accepted as the timing equipment was not of the approved type.

Over the winter of 1923–1924 the car was sent to the aircraft maker Boulton Paul at Norwich, for wind tunnel tests. They streamlined the car with a narrow radiator cowl at the nose and a long tapered tail. The rear wheels were also fitted with disk covers. Engine compression was raised by new pistons.

Campbell returned to Fanø in the summer, but the beach was in poor condition and crowd control of the spectators was poor. On the first run both rear tyres were ripped off Blue Bird and narrowly missed the crowd. Campbell protested to the officials about safety standards and declined to take any responsibility for anything else. Sadly, this time a front tyre came off and killed a boy in the crowd.

The car was taken to Pendine Sands in South Wales and saw a more successful result with the first of Campbell's nine records. The record was achieved on 24 September 1924, with a speed of 146.16 mph (235.23 km/h) and an officially sanctioned time. After this he put the car up for sale for £1,500, but decided to keep it for a further attempt on hearing that Parry-Thomas was also planning a record attempt with Babs. Blue Bird returned to Pendine in 1925, and on 21 July it raised this record to 150.766 mph (242.628 km/h), the first time a car had exceeded 150 mph (240 km/h). The best run over the mile had reached 152.833 mph (245.961 km/h), a figure that appeared in contemporary motoring adverts for oil and sparkplugs. To commemorate this achievement Campbell had commemorative models of Blue Bird made.

== Survival today ==
After Campbell, the Sunbeam appears to have returned to circuit racing with wider tyres and a return to the short tail with green paintwork. As late as 1936, bandleader Billy Cotton recorded 121.57 mph (195.65 km/h) over a kilometre on the beach at Southport. The car may have stayed in Lancashire afterwards, turning up there during World War II and then being sold to the Beaulieu collection in 1958.

It is on show today at the National Motor Museum at Beaulieu, Hampshire. The engine has undergone extensive restoration after suffering severe damage in the 1990s and was run for the first time in 20 years in January 2014.

== 2015 appeal and restoration ==
During a test fire-up in 1993 to assess the car's condition, disaster struck when a blocked oil way in the engine caused it to seize and "throw a rod". For several years after that, the car was on display in the museum with a very visible hole in its engine where the piston and connecting rod had exited.

In January 2014, following a complete mechanical rebuild undertaken by the National Motor Museum's workshop team over a period of many years, the Sunbeam was fired-up again, the first time it had been heard in public in over 50 years. The following month it was a star of the show at Rétromobile, Paris, and was also run at the Goodwood Festival of Speed.

In 2015 the National Motor Museum, Beaulieu launched an appeal to raise funds to build a new gearbox for the Sunbeam 350HP.

The museum's manager and chief engineer, Doug Hill said:

During the Sunbeam's long and chequered history, its Achilles heel has been a weak gearbox. At some time after WWII, the original gearbox was removed and subsequently lost. It was replaced with a gearbox that was originally used in an Albion 35hp van, designed to take only one tenth of the power this engine produces and the way in which the braking system has been modified means that this installation severely compromises the braking of the vehicle.

For the next stage of the Sunbeam's restoration story, we need to build a new gearbox from scratch. As the original gearbox no longer exists and there is no template to follow, this will be a challenge requiring all of our knowledge and expertise. It is a vital step in our journey to restore the car to its 1925 specification and will greatly help us to drive the car closer to the speed it was built for.

On 21 July 2015 at Pendine beach in Wales the 90th anniversary of Sir Malcolm Campbell's first world land speed record in ‘Bluebird' was recreated by his grandson, Don Wales, also a Land Speed Record holder, who recreated the event in the fully restored car.

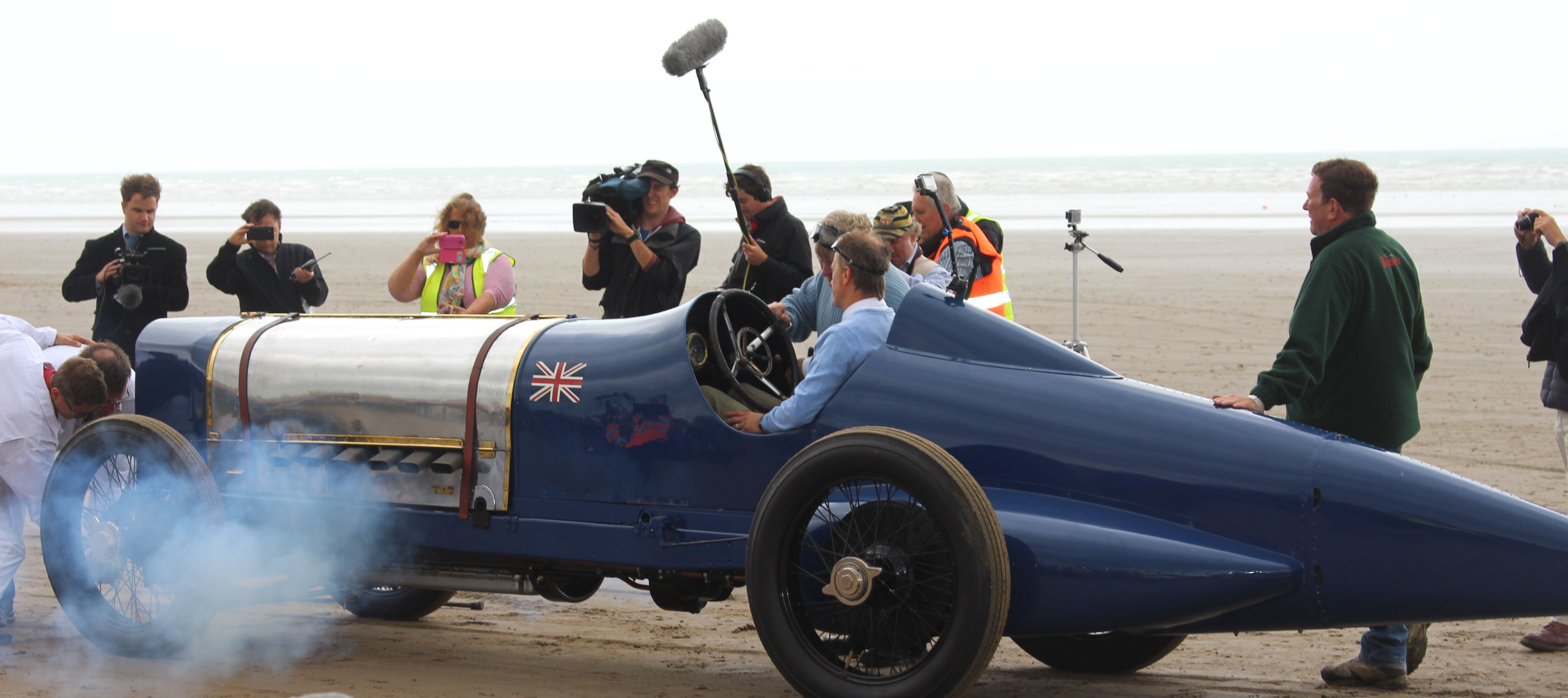
Sunbeam 350HP at Pendine Sands in Wales on the 90th anniversary of Sir Malcolm Campbell's land speed record.

Commenting on the restoration appeal Don said: "This beautiful car has been lovingly restored and looked after by Doug Hill and the team and its only right that such an iconic car deserves to have the final pieces in place to complete her!"

The new gearbox will be part of a long term project to restore the car to its 1925 specification. This would also require the fabrication of two full length exhaust pipes, a new seat and upholstery, and the re-manufacture of a slightly dropped nose cone and rear wheel spats.

In 2016 the National Motor Museum Trust are one of the chosen charities for the newly relaunched London Motor Show where the Sunbeam 350HP will be on display as part of the appeal.
