= Cooper Mark IX =

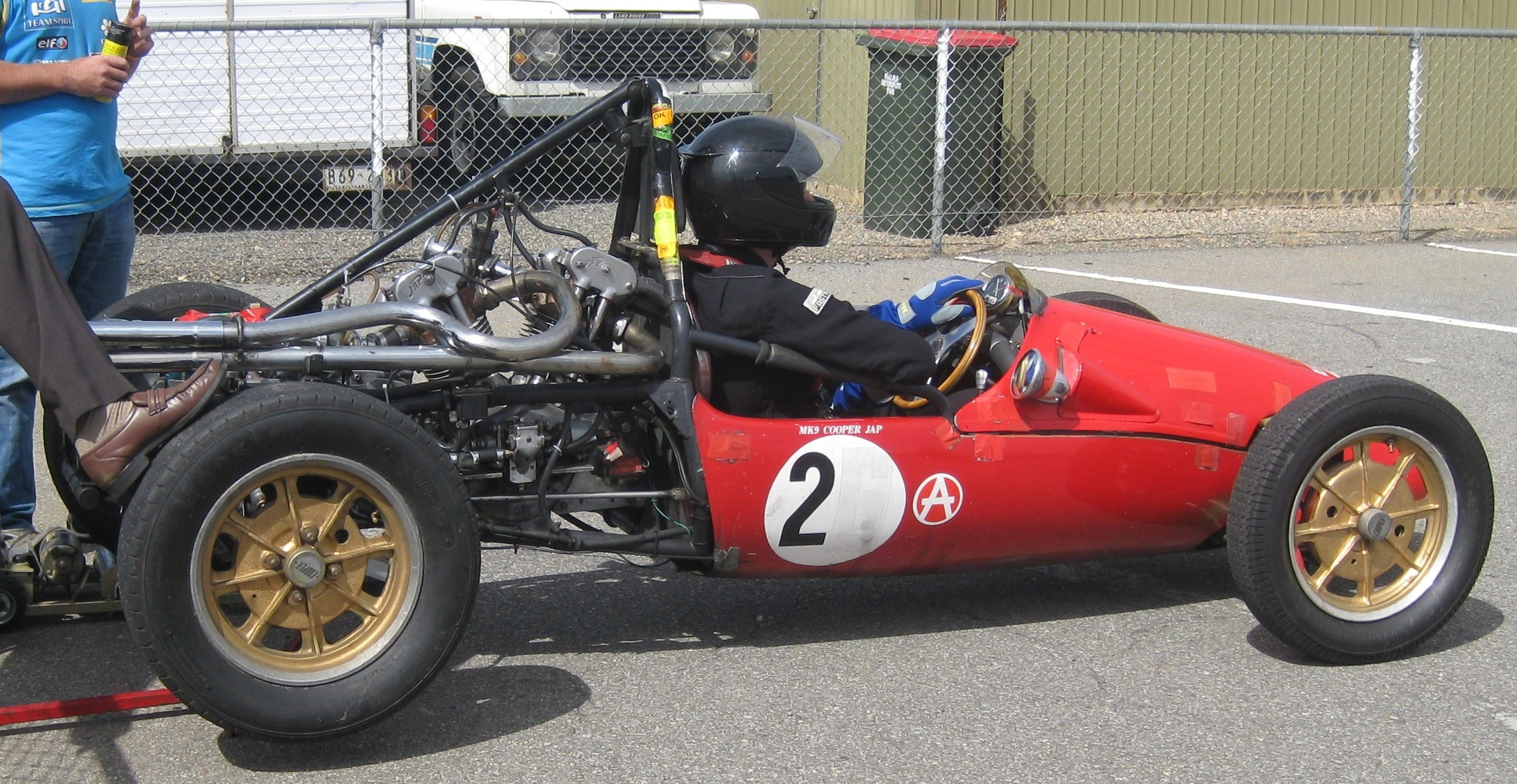
Cooper Mk.IX

The Cooper Mk.IX is an open-wheel Formula Three race car, designed, developed and built by British manufacturer Cooper in 1955. The first version, dubbed the T36, was powered by a 500 cc (31 cu in) JA Prestwich Industries (JAP) single-cylinder engine, and featured a singular brake disk at the rear of the car, flatter springs to mitigate ground clearance, altered and adjusted center spring mountings, and reworked engine mounts. The second version, dubbed the T37, featured an elongated chassis and body, and a larger and more powerful 1,000 cc (61 cu in) OHV V-2 engine. Chassis construction was a tubular space frame, and the body was made from aluminium (although glass fibre was later experimented with). Overall weight was between 500–530 lb (230–240 kg). The wheelbase was 7 ft 3 in (2.21 m), the rear track was 3 ft 7 in (1.09 m), while the front track was 3 ft 9 in (1.14 m), overall height (from top-to-bottom) was 2 ft 7 in (0.79 m), and the overall width was 1 ft 11.5 in (0.597 m).
