= John Cooper (car maker) =

British auto racer and company founder (1923–2000)

John Cooper OBE
- Born: John Newton Cooper; 17 July 1923; Surbiton, Surrey, United Kingdom
- Died: 24 December 2000 (aged 77)
- Occupation: Car maker

John Newton Cooper OBE (17 July 1923 – 24 December 2000) was a co-founder, with his father Charles Cooper, of the Cooper Car Company. Born in Surbiton, Surrey, United Kingdom, he became an auto racing legend with his rear-engined chassis design that would eventually change the face of the sport at its highest levels, from Formula One to the Indianapolis 500.

Charles Cooper ran a small garage in Surbiton that specialised in maintaining racing cars. His son John left school at age 15 to become an apprentice toolmaker and served in the Royal Air Force as an instrument maker in World War II. After the war, he and his father began building simple, inexpensive single-seat racers for privateers, often from surplus military hardware. The cars were extremely successful and quickly in high demand, and in 1948, they founded their own company to build more.

In stereotypical British fashion, Cooper always downplayed the story about how they decided to put the engine in the back of their racing cars, insisting it was a matter of convenience. The original design for the first rear-engined Cooper racing car was drawn up by Owen Maddock, a designer employed by Cooper Car Company. Because the car was powered by a motorcycle engine, they put the engine in the back, driving a chain. "We certainly had no feeling that we were creating some scientific breakthrough!...We put the engine at the rear...because it was the practical thing to do," Cooper said.

Initially, Cooper raced his own cars on a regular basis, but as the company grew, he found less time available to compete. He did, however, find time to set a number of records at Montlhéry at the end of 1953.

In the early 1950s, it seemed as if every aspiring young British racing driver began behind the wheel of a Cooper, and Cooper's Formula One cars were driven by the legendary drivers of the time – Jack Brabham, Stirling Moss, Maurice Trintignant, and Bruce McLaren. In a nine-year period, the team took 16 Grand Prix wins, as Brabham and the team won back-to-back World Championships in 1959 and 1960.

While in Sebring, Florida, for the 1959 United States Grand Prix, Cooper got to know American driver Rodger Ward, the reigning USAC national champion and Indianapolis 500 winner. After Ward had been astounded by the cornering ability of Cooper's little cars on the road course, he offered to arrange a test for them at Indianapolis Motor Speedway, saying, "You've got to try out your car around the Oval. Indy's waiting for you!" Cooper took one of his Formula One cars to the Speedway in the autumn of 1960, as drivers, constructors and racing personalities gathered in "amused tolerance, mixed with obvious curiosity," according to Cooper. When Brabham, an Indy rookie, began his warmup laps, he was unaware of the requirement to gradually build up his speed on the track. He clocked his second lap at 144.8 miles per hour, fast enough for the third row on the previous race's grid! Ward was so enthused, Cooper had to agree to let him drive the car, too. From that point, the Indianapolis establishment realised the writing was on the wall and the days of their front-engined roadsters were numbered. Within a few years, John Cooper's revolution of open-wheeled racing was complete.

Cooper's development of the British Motor Corporation Mini – the Mini Cooper – was adored by both rally racers and ordinary road drivers. Before John Cooper's death, the Cooper name was licensed to BMW for the higher-performance versions of the cars, inspired by the original Mini, sold as the MINI. John, along with his son Mike Cooper, served in an advisory role to BMW and Rover's New MINI design team.

Cooper was the last surviving Formula One team principal from the formative years of the sport, and he often lamented later in life that the fun had long since gone out of racing. He helped establish Britain's domination of motorsport technology, which continues today, and he was awarded Officer of the Order of the British Empire (OBE) for his services to British motorsport. He remained head of the West Sussex family garage business (which had outlets for Mini Cooper at East Preston and Honda at Ferring) until his death at age 77 in 2000.

== See also ==
- John Cooper Works
