= Silver Bullet (car) =

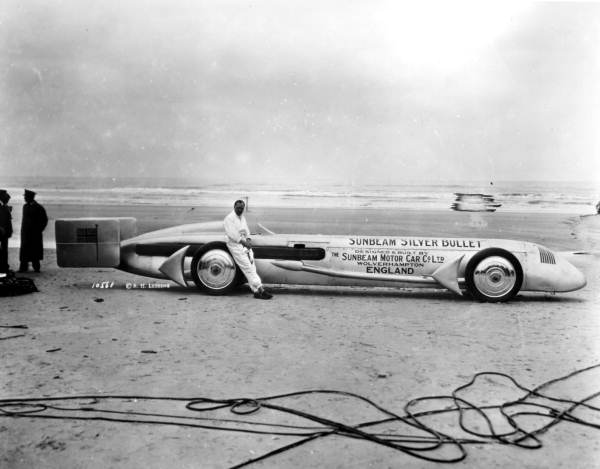

Overview
- Manufacturer: Sunbeam of Wolverhampton
- Production: one-off (1929)

Body and chassis
- Body style: Land speed record car

Powertrain
- Engine: Two Sunbeam 2,000hp supercharged V12 engines, totalling 48 litres

The Sunbeam Silver Bullet was a world land speed record challenging automobile built by Sunbeam of Wolverhampton for Kaye Don in 1929.

Powered by two supercharged engines of 24 litres each, it looked impressive but failed to achieve any records, and was the manufacturer’s last attempt at the record.

Sunbeam previously won the 200 mph record in 1927 with the Sunbeam 1000HP, the first car to pass 200 mph. This record was broken in 1928, and the company decided to build a car capable of reaching 250 mph (400 km/h) to recover it. Only aero engines offered enough power to do so, and such a car would also provide a test bed for developing a new generation of aero-engines.

== Sunbeam 2,000 hp engine ==
Sunbeam decided to develop a new aero engine of 2,000 hp (1,500 kW), and the car would be powered by two of them.

This new engine was a water-cooled V-12 with a 50° angle between the banks. Ideal balance usually favours an angle of 60°, but this choice made the engine narrower overall. Cylinder bore was 140 mm (5.5 in) and stroke was 130 mm (5.1 in), for a capacity of 24.02 litres. This oversquare geometry was a first for Sunbeam, but encouraged a high-revving and thus more powerful engine.

The engines were supercharged, using a large centrifugal blower, geared to 17,000 rpm. This was increasingly common aero engine practice of the time, in both the Napier Lion and the Rolls-Royce R-type, but again was a first for Sunbeam.

When installed in the record-attempt car the engines had an unusual cooling system using melting ice rather than a radiator. This avoided the drag of an open radiator, but obviously could only cool for as long as the ice lasted. It was a workable system for land speed records, used by the contemporary Golden Arrow and more recently by the JCB Dieselmax. Silver Bullet had an 11.5-cubic-foot (0.33 m^{3}) ice tank, filled with 5.5 hundredweight (about 280 kilograms) of ice before each run, and a one-gallon mixing tank in the nose.

=== Photographs & Video ===
Photographs of the car are rare, although there are some at the Brooklands photo archive. These show it outside Delaney & Sons. garage, a popular location for racing in this era. Some also show close-ups, including the innovative rear aerofoil that could be adjusted to generate downforce.

Rare Movietone News footage on YouTube shows the car outside the Sunbeam factory in Wolverhampton, England with a crowd of Sunbeam workers. Kaye Don arrives driving the Sunbeam V12 racing and land speed record car "Sunbeam Tiger". He is met by Louis Coatalen, Sunbeam's Managing Director and Chief Engineer who describes the effort to make the car. Don describes the planned attempt on the Land Speed Record at Daytona Beach on Florida

== Specifications ==
=== General characteristics ===
- Type: 12-cylinder liquid-cooled 50° vee piston aircraft engine
- Bore: 140 mm (5.512")
- Stroke: 130 mm (5.118")
- Displacement: 24.01 litre (1465.4 cuin)
- Designer: Louis Coatalen

=== Components ===
- Supercharger: centrifugal single-impeller at 17,000 rpm
- Cooling system: water from melting ice

=== Performance ===
- Power output: 2,000 hp (claimed) 4,000 hp for the car

== Unsuccessful record attempts ==
Competition for the land speed record between Segrave's Golden Arrow and Malcolm Campbell's new Blue Bird was fierce, so the car was built quickly, working around the clock in shifts. This left little time for thorough static testing of the engines, made even worse as only two engines were ever built and so the only engines available for testing were the race engines themselves. Silver Bullet first appeared in public on 21 February 1930.

Following the other teams, the first record attempt was to be made on Daytona Beach, in Florida, with Kaye Don driving. The car arrived at Daytona on 8 March and Louis Coatalen himself on 16th. The record attempts went poorly though, with engine reliability problems and the car proving difficult to control. The fastest speed attained was 186 mph (299 km/h), well below Sunbeam's own record of three years earlier.

After the team returned home, further attempts were made to improve the car with testing on Pendine Sands.

Sunbeam aircraft engines had never recovered from the financial effects of the end of the Great War. Coupled with the Depression of the 1930s, Sunbeam simply could not afford a competition programme of this scale. Although other UK car companies even did well in this period, Sunbeam did not and went into receivership in 1935.

The Silver Bullet was sold to Jack Field, a Southport hotelier and garage owner. He tested the car on Southport beach, scene of Segrave's earlier success with the Sunbeam Tiger, but couldn't solve its problems and eventually the car was scrapped.

== Tribute to the 'Silver Bullet' in Public Art ==
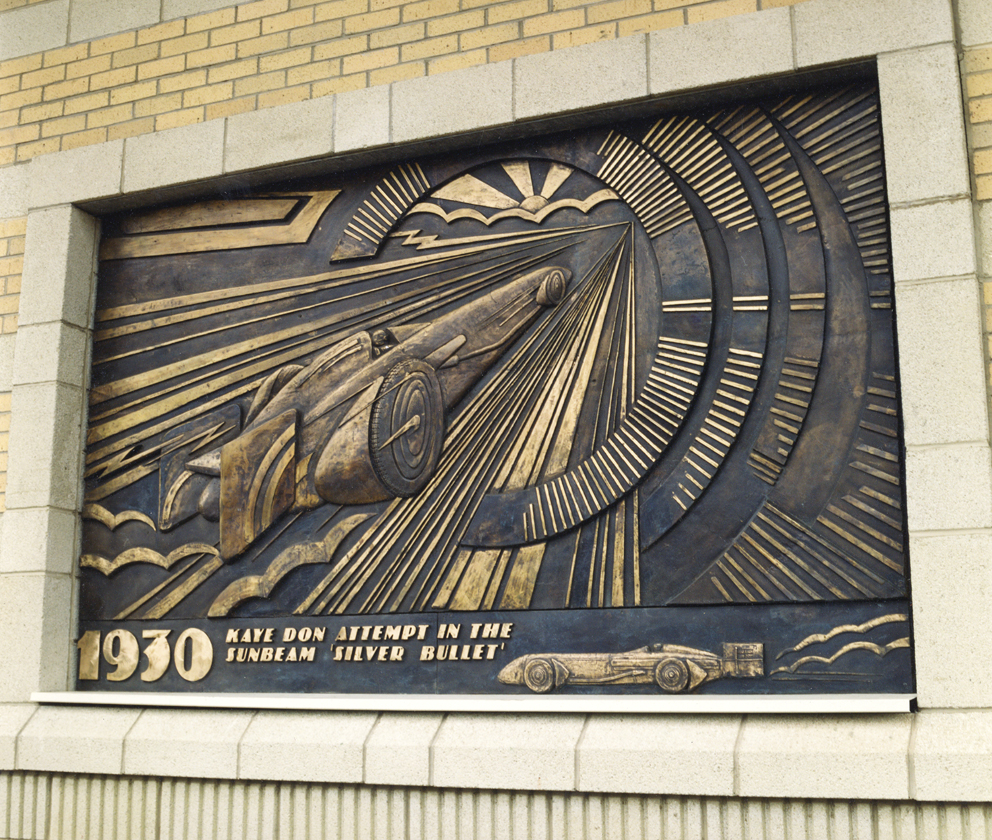
Steve Field and John McKenna's bronze panel of the Silver Bullet

In 1996 a redevelopment of the former works site of Star cars, in St. John's, Wolverhampton into a new Retail Park saw a themed set of public art features referencing the Sunbeam Land speed record attempts. A bronze relief panel tribute to the Silver Bullet car was depicted in a bas relief, attempting the speed record with reference to Kaye Don as the driver. The whole series of artworks around the Retail site were a design collaboration of artist Steve Field and the sculptor John McKenna A.R.B.S and rendered in 1930's Art Deco manner. They showed other Sunbeam Record attempts and reference the historical industrial car making heritage of Wolverhampton.
