= Louis Coatalen =

Louis Hervé Coatalen (11 September 1879 – 23 May 1962) was an automobile engineer and racing driver born in Brittany who spent much of his adult life in Britain and took British nationality. He was a pioneer of the design and development of internal combustion engines for cars and aircraft.

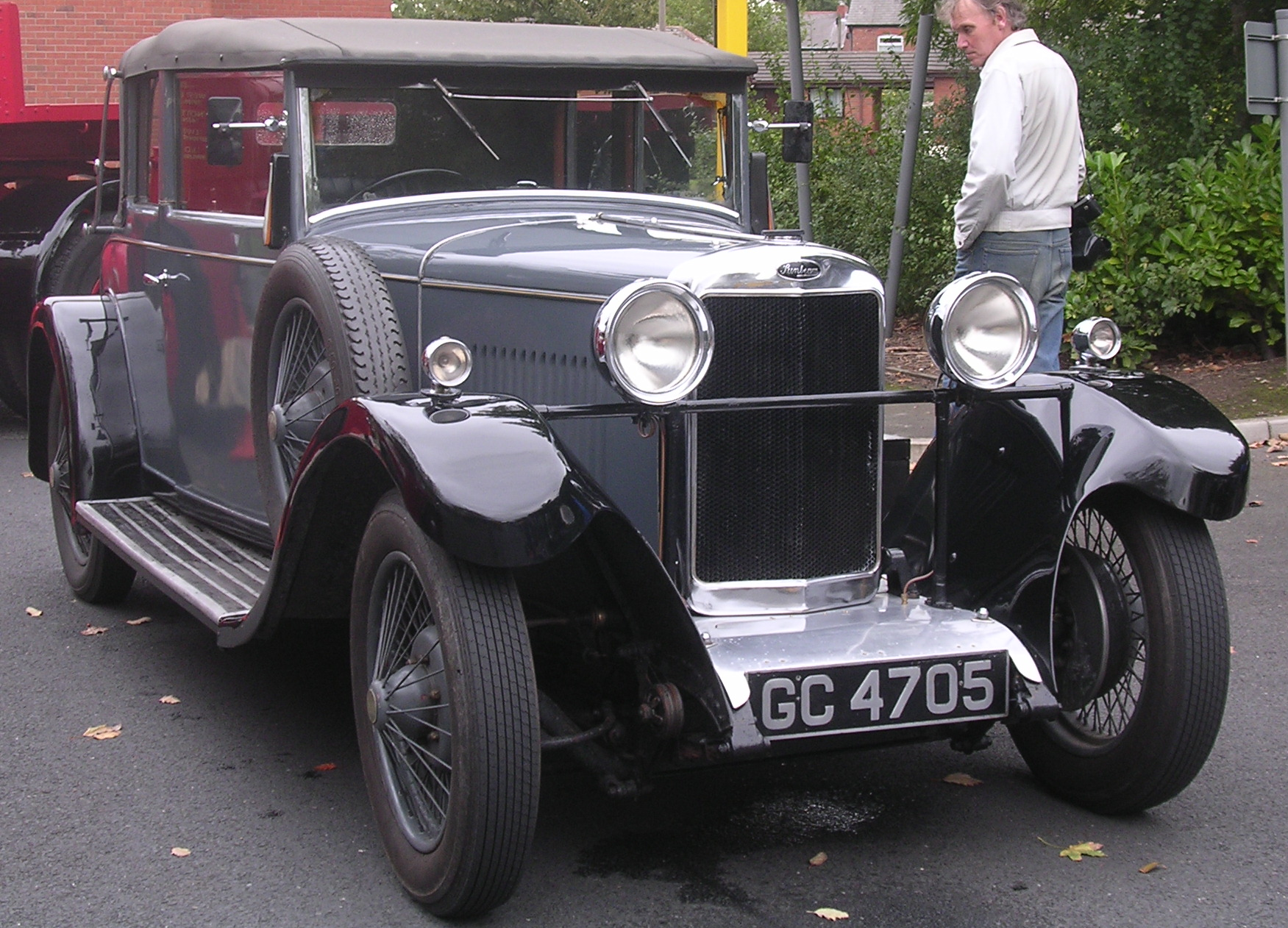
1930 Sunbeam 16 drophead coupé by James Young

== France ==
Coatalen, the second son of J Coatalen, was born in the Breton fishing town of Concarneau / Konk-Kerne and went on to study engineering at Arts et Métiers ParisTech, in the town of Cluny (France).

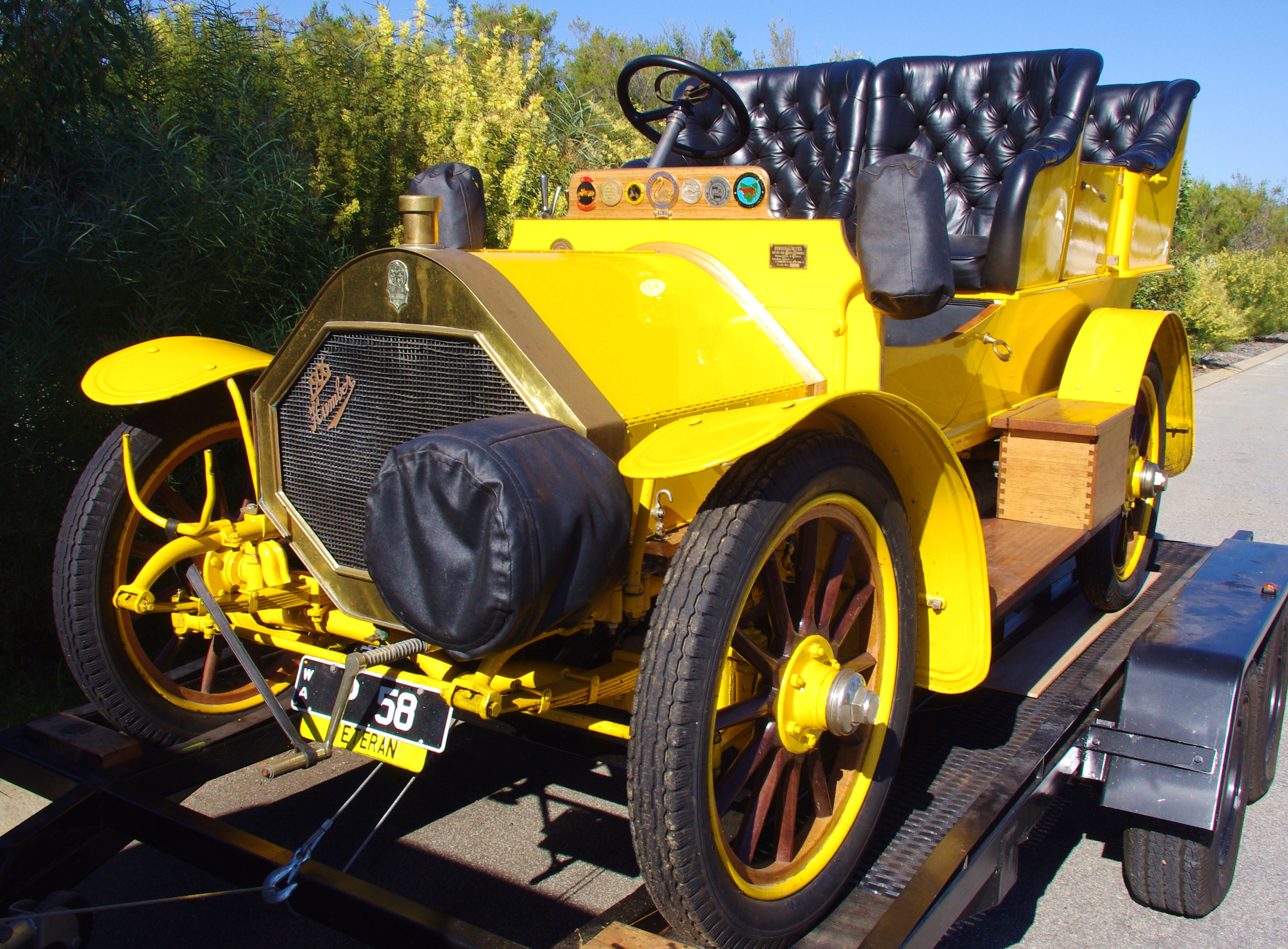
1906 Humber 10-12

== Career ==
After serving his apprenticeship with De Dion-Bouton, Clément and Panhard et Levasseur he left France to work in England in 1900. After a short time with the Crowden Motor Car Company he joined Humber Limited in 1901 and was to become their chief engineer. He designed their 8-10 and 10-12 models. They were highly successful but their design was, unusually for Coatalen, totally conventional.

In 1906 aged 26 or 27 he went into partnership with bicycle manufacturer William Hillman. In 1908 he drove their Hillman-Coatalen car in the Isle of Man Tourist Trophy race.

=== Sunbeam ===
The brief partnership was dissolved in 1909 and Coatalen moved from Coventry to Wolverhampton to join Sunbeam. He was appointed joint managing director (with William M Iliff) in 1914.

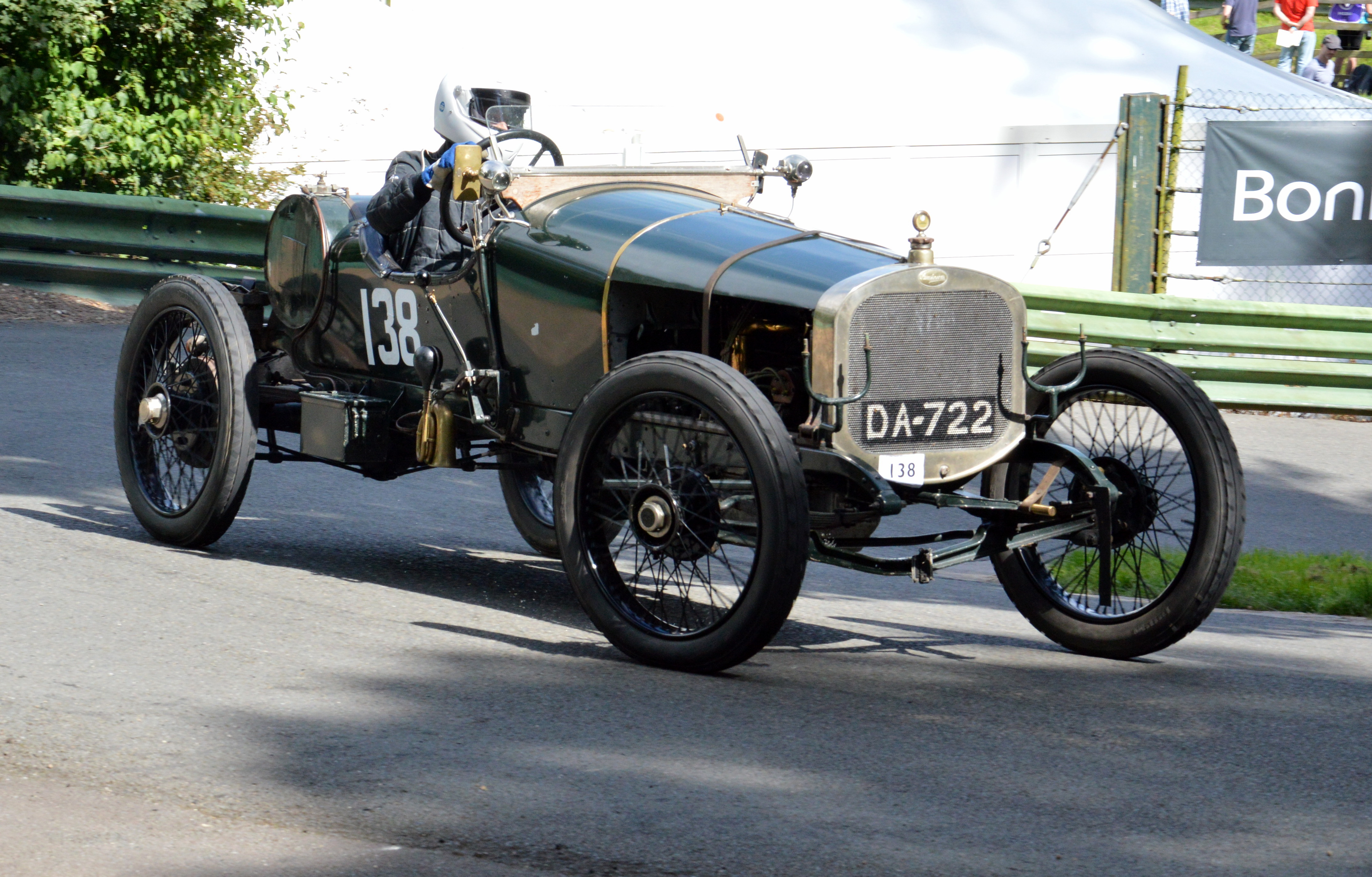
1913 Sunbeam 12-16 sports

==== Sunbeam 12-16 ====
His first design was one of the outstanding light car designs of its day. In 1912 three 12-16s took the first three places in Dieppe's Coupe de l'Auto 2-day race for 3-litre cars. The first of the three cars was also third in the race for Grand Prix cars. But his designs rapidly became less innovative and he seemed to copy Peugeot developments rather than use his own.

==== Grand Prix races ====
Sunbeam cars won the Tourist Trophy races in 1914 and 1922. The Sunbeam cars that took the first three places in the 1923 French Grand Prix were said to have owed much to Fiat designs.

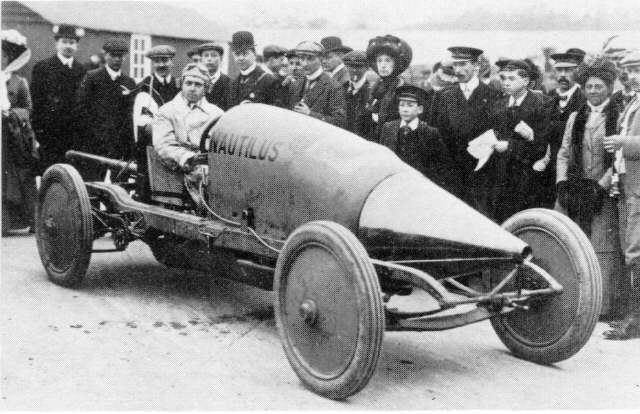
Coatalen's streamlined Nautilus in 1910

=== Aero engines ===
During World War I he designed aircraft engines for Sunbeam. On his death in 1962 Lord Sempill wrote to The Times to point out that Coatalen was one of the three leading designers of engines for aircraft and airships used by the RNAS in the First World War. The other two, he said, were W O Bentley and Sir Henry Royce.

Sunbeam produced a greater variety of aero engines than any other business during the war. W O Bentley said this was "in part because Coatalen was so good at selling ideas to the Admiralty and War Office."

He was appointed a director of S.T.D. Motors when in 1920 Sunbeam joined with Clément-Talbot and Darracq to form S.T.D. Motors Limited, but he remained chief engineer of Sunbeam. He was later put in charge of the technical and designing staffs of all S.T.D. subsidiaries.

=== Race cars ===
With the success of 1.5-litre Talbot-Darracq cars, his main interest became racing cars. Their wins catapulted Sunbeam to the highest echelons of international competition from the legendary success at the 1912 Coupe de l’Auto to winning the 1914 and 1922 Tourist Trophy and 1923 and 1924 Grand Prix. Coatelen collaborated with the industry foremost designer Ernest Henry on the 1922 Grand Prix Sunbeams and had some of the most respected drivers of the period – Henry Segrave, Jean Chassagne and Kenelm Lee Guinness driving his Sunbeam cars.

In 1926, Sunbeam's racing activities were taken into the S.T.D. company and moved to Suresnes near Paris in France and although Coatalen continued working part-time in Wolverhampton, he spent most of his time in Paris.

On his direction, Sunbeam was among the first British manufacturers to provide front wheel brakes. Coatalen's innovations included balancing the wheels (a technique also claimed by Sig Haugdahl) and putting the oil pump in the sump, and he was an early advocate of shock absorbers.

=== Record breaking ===
Sunbeam became heavily involved in land speed record attempts including the successful 1000HP car of 1927 and the failed 'Silver Bullet' of 1930. Louis Coatalen designed the engines for the first car to exceed 150 miles per hour and the first car to exceed 200 miles an hour, the 1000 horsepower Sunbeam driven by Henry Segrave.

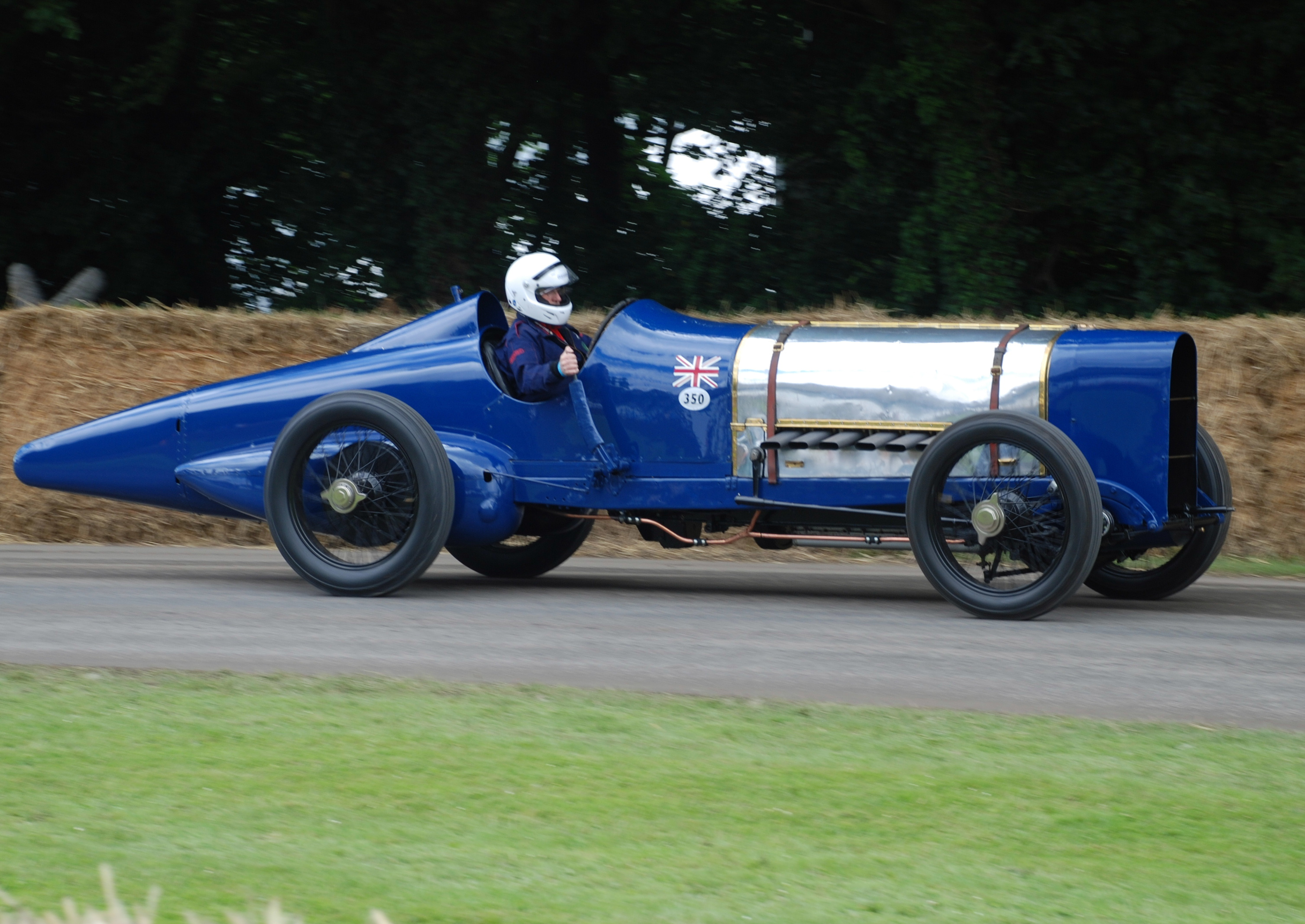
Sunbeam 350 horsepower Campbell's Bluebird, first car to exceed 150 mph

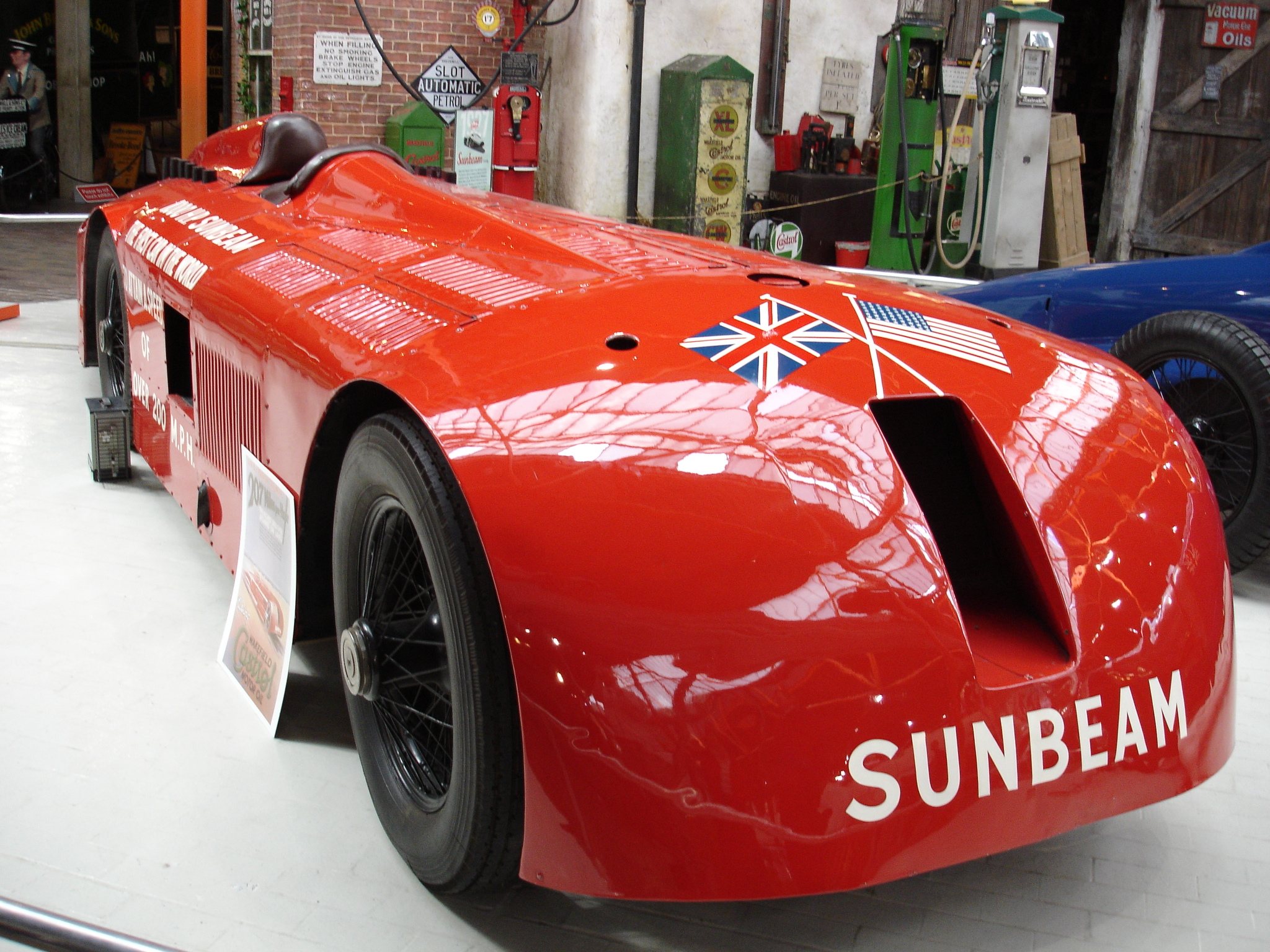
Sunbeam 1000 horsepower first car to exceed 200 mph

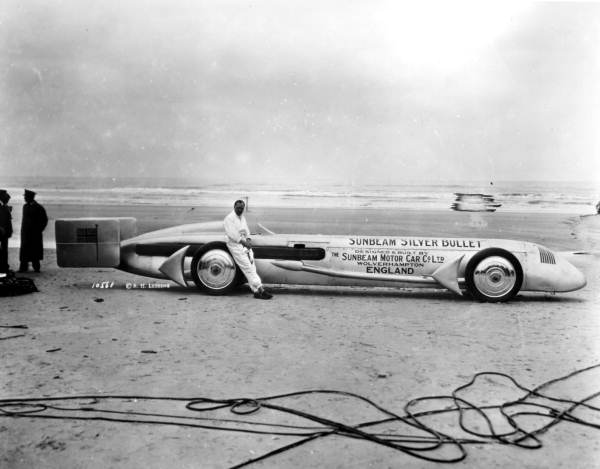
Sunbeam Silver Bullet 4000 horsepower failed to reach 250 mph

== France ==
From the proceeds of his S.T.D. share sale, Coatalen bought control of the French branch of Lockheed hydraulics and with the income from this bought a yacht and a villa on the Isle of Capri.

During the Second World War he lived in France and he continued living there until his sudden death in Paris in 1962 aged 82.

=== Marriages ===
Louis Coatalen married four times: in 1902 to Annie Ellen Davis (divorced 1906), in 1910 to Olive Bath (daughter of a Sunbeam director, Henry J Bath), in 1923 to Iris van Raalte, née Graham, and in 1934 to Ellen Bridson known to family as Dickie. There is no record of a marriage to a member of the Hillman family.

== Impresario ==
Following the publication of Coatalen's obituary, Sunbeam expert Anthony S Heal wrote to The Times to describe Coatalen as an impresario of the motor industry. "He led and inspired others to achieve miracles they themselves would not have thought possible."

W O Bentley described him as "not only a first class businessman who made (and lost) a great deal of money in his active life with Sunbeams; he had other qualities which I liked even better; he was highly educated and amusing and a tremendous raconteur, and he was dedicated to motor racing".
