= Cooper Car Company =

British car manufacturer

(United Kingdom) Cooper
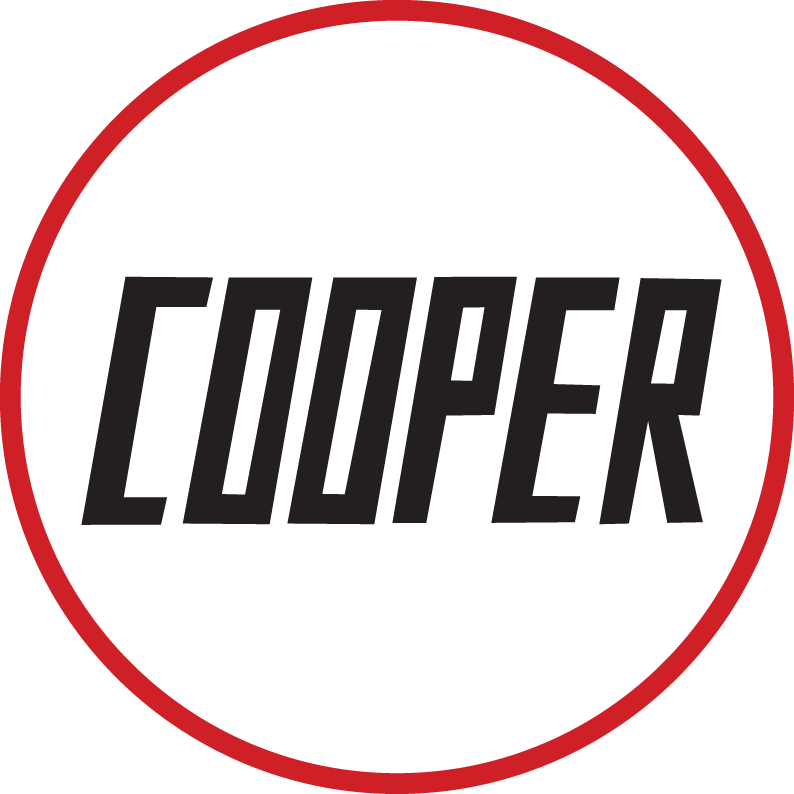
- Full name: Cooper Car Company
- Base: Surbiton, Surrey, United Kingdom
- Founder(s): Charles Cooper; John Cooper
- Noted drivers: (United Kingdom) Stirling Moss (France) Maurice Trintignant (Australia) Jack Brabham (New Zealand) Bruce McLaren (United Kingdom) John Surtees (Austria) Jochen Rindt (Mexico) Pedro Rodríguez

Formula One World Championship career
- First entry: 1950 Monaco Grand Prix
- Races entered: 129
- Constructors' Championships: 2 (1959, 1960)
- Drivers' Championships: 2 (1959, 1960)
- Race victories: 16
- Pole positions: 11
- Fastest laps: 14
- Final entry: 1969 Monaco Grand Prix

The Cooper Car Company was a British car manufacturer founded in December 1947 by Charles Cooper and his son John Cooper. Together with John's boyhood friend, Eric Brandon, they began by building racing cars in Charles's small garage in Surbiton, Surrey, England, in 1946. Through the 1950s and early 1960s they reached motor racing's highest levels as their mid-engined, single-seat cars competed in both Formula One and the Indianapolis 500, and their Mini Cooper dominated rally racing. The Cooper name lives on in the Cooper versions of the Mini production cars that are built in England, but is now owned and marketed by BMW.

== Origins ==
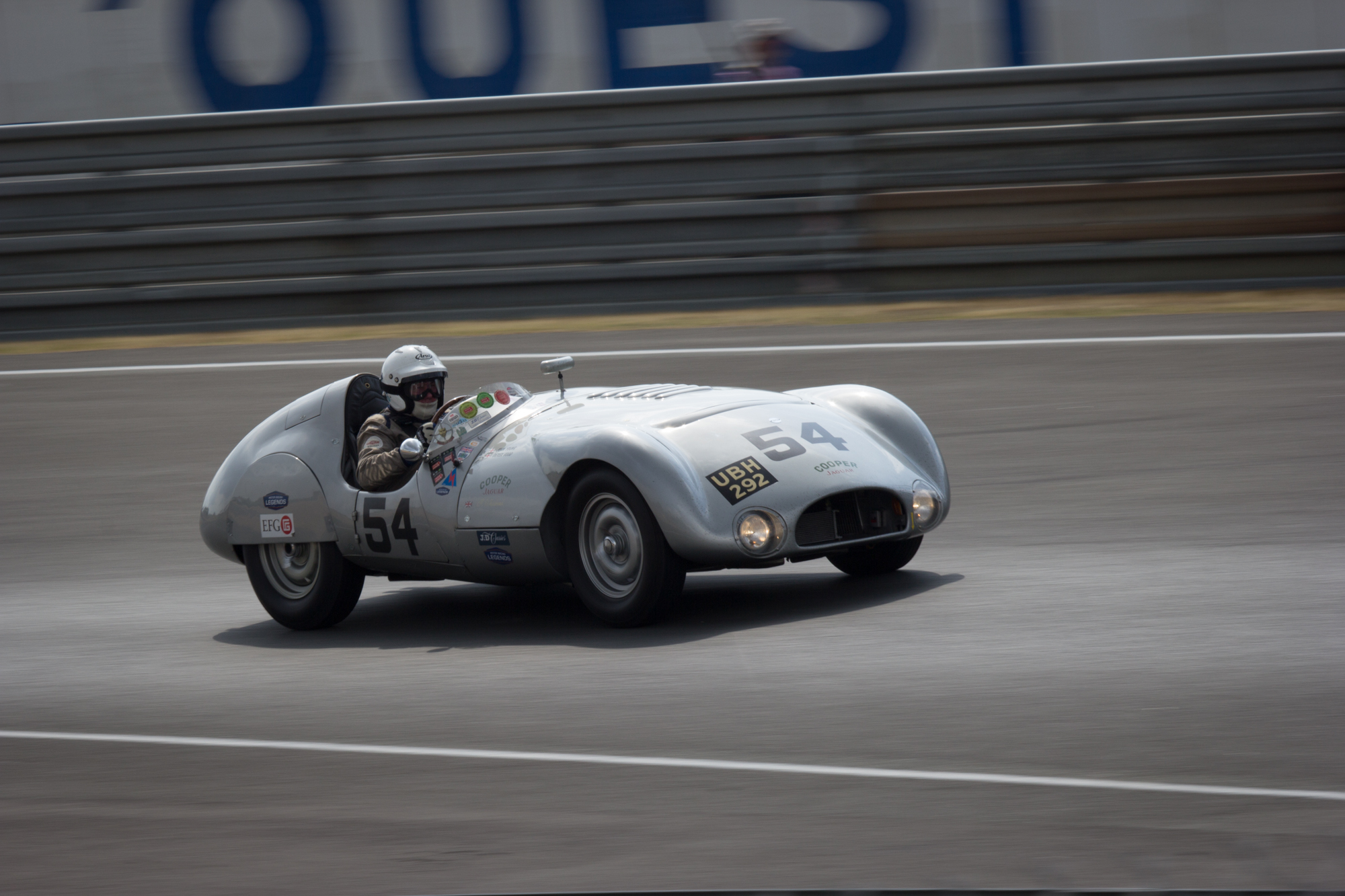
1954 Cooper Jaguar T33

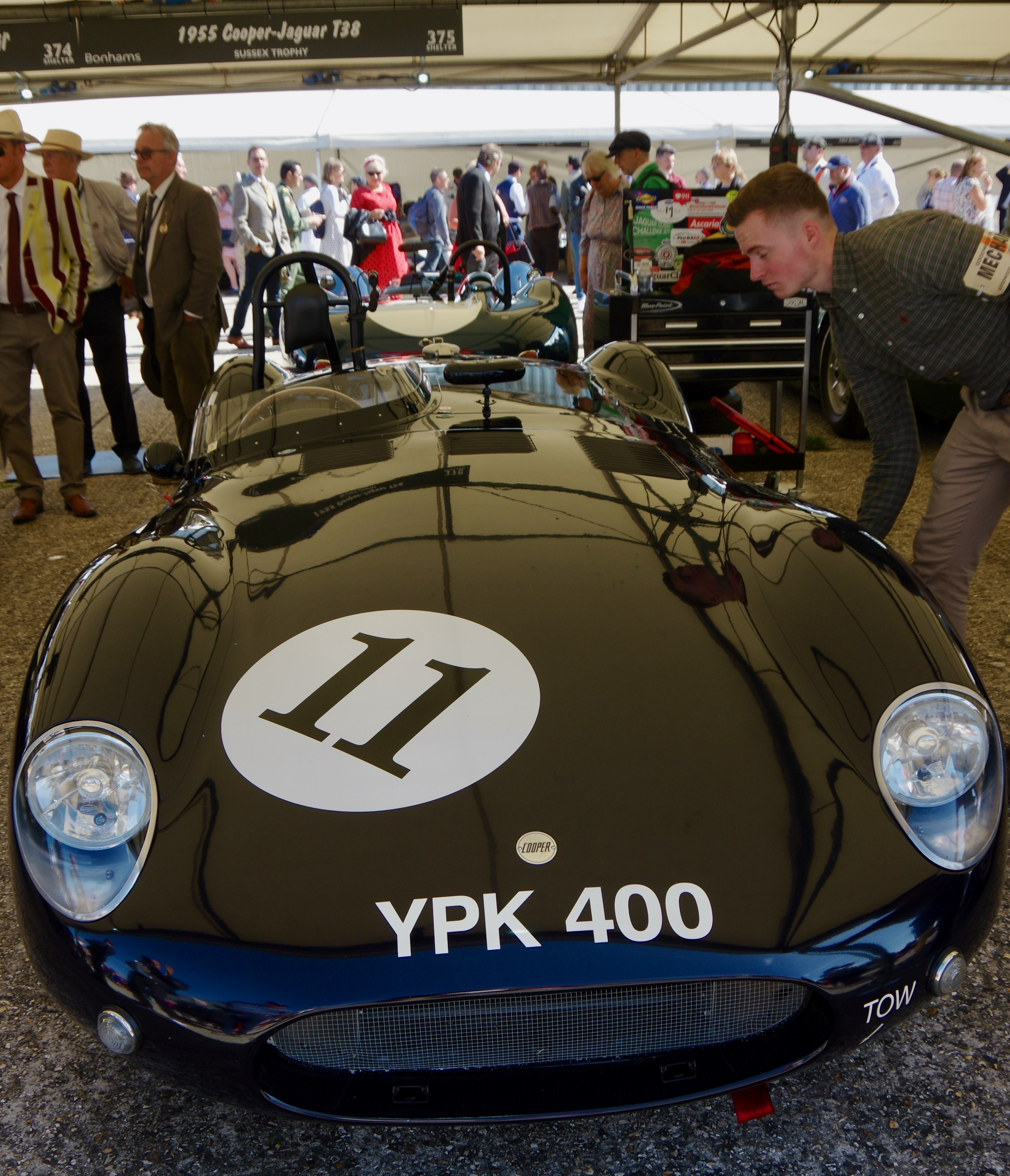
1955 Cooper Jaguar T38

The first cars built by the Coopers were single-seat 500-cc Formula Three racing cars driven by John Cooper and Eric Brandon, and powered by a JAP motorcycle engine. Since materials were in short supply immediately after World War II, the prototypes were constructed by joining two old Fiat Topolino front-ends together. According to John Cooper, the stroke of genius that would make the Coopers an automotive legend—the location of the engine behind the driver in the Rear mid-engine, rear-wheel-drive layout pioneered by German race cars in the 1920s and 1930s—was merely a practical matter at the time. There was nothing new about 'mid' engined racing cars but Coopers led the way in popularising what was to become the dominant arrangement for racing cars. As the car was powered by a motorcycle engine, with its gearbox driving a chain, it was more convenient to have the engine and drivetrain in the back.

Called the Cooper 500, the cars' success in hill climbs and on track, including Eric winning the 500 race at one of the first postwar meetings at Gransden Lodge Airfield, quickly created demand from other drivers (including, over the years, Stirling Moss, Peter Collins, Jim Russell, Ivor Bueb, Ken Tyrrell, and Bernie Ecclestone) and led to the establishment of the Cooper Car Company to build more. The business grew by providing an inexpensive entry to motorsport for seemingly every aspiring young British driver, and the company became the world's first and largest postwar specialist manufacturer of racing cars for sale to privateers.

Cooper built some 300 single-and twin-cylinder cars during the 1940s and 1950s and dominated the F3 category, winning 64 of 78 major races between 1951 and 1954. This volume of construction enabled the company to grow into the senior categories. Using a modified Cooper 500 chassis, the T12 model, Cooper had its first taste of top-tier racing when Harry Schell qualified for the 1950 Monaco Grand Prix. Though Schell retired in the first lap, this marked the first appearance of a rear-engined racer at a Grand Prix event since the end of WWII.

The front-engined Formula Two Cooper Bristol model was introduced in 1952. Various iterations of this design were driven by a number of notable drivers – among them Juan Manuel Fangio and Mike Hawthorn – and furthered the company's growing reputation by appearing in Grand Prix races, which at the time were run to F2 regulations.

Until Cooper began building rear-engined sports cars in 1955, about two years after the mid-engine Porsche 550 was introduced, it had not become aware of the benefits of having the engine behind the driver. Based on the 500-cc cars and powered by a modified Coventry Climax fire-pump engine, these T39 cars were called "Bob-Tails". With the centre of gravity closer to the middle of the car, Coopernd it was less liable to spins and much more effective at putting the power down to the road, so they decided to build a single-seater version and began entering it in Formula 2 races.

== Rear-engined revolution ==
At the 1956 French Grand Prix a rear-mid-engined car qualified, the Bugatti Type 251, but this car, with a straight-8 mounted transversely behind the driver, proved to be uncompetitive and retired after 18 laps.

Two rear-engined Cooper T43s with the still-undersized and underpowered 2 litre Formula 1 variant of the Climax FPF engine attempted to qualify for the 1957 Monaco Grand Prix; only Jack Brabham succeeded, second to last and over 6 seconds slower. After crashes, Brabham raised some eyebrows when running third towards the end of the race until the fuel pump failed on the 100th lap. He coasted to the harbour and pushed the car all the way to and over the finish line. Despite being five laps down, he took sixth place.

Later that year, in the 1957 German Grand Prix on the very long Nürburgring, 1500cc Formula Two cars were allowed to take part. F2 regulations allowed closed bodywork, thus three Porsche 550A sportscars were entered from which only passenger seat and spare wheel were removed. The best F2 was the Porsche of Edgar Barth who qualified and finished 12th, ahead of some 2500cc F1 cars, and ahead of no less than six Cooper-Climax, including Brabham.

The first F1 win of a rear engine car, at the 1958 Argentine Grand Prix, can be attributed to circumstances and deception. In absence of most British teams, only 10 cars showed up early in the season in South America, one of them Rob Walker's privately entered Cooper-Climax driven by Vanwall driver Stirling Moss. Due to hot weather, the race was shortened, and all teams were expected to stop for a tyre change. The Cooper T43, with regular four stud wheels, was at a disadvantage compared to the single centerlock wheel nut of others. Moss took the lead while others entered in the pits, and then the Italian teams took it easy believing he would have to come in, too. They realised too late that the nimble little car would not pit at all, and the two Ferrari drivers started to chase him down, but did not manage to catch him.

At the 1958 Monaco Grand Prix, three new Cooper T45s qualified among the top five. When Maurice Trintignant won the race at Monaco, the racing world was stunned and a rear-engined revolution had begun, even though the front engine cars won all remaining races and the underpowered Cooper only added two podiums. The next year, 1959, Brabham and the Cooper works team became the first to win the Formula One World Championship in a rear-engined car. Both team and driver repeated the feat in 1960, and every F1 World Champion after 1958 has been sitting in front of his engine. It took some more years until all sports cars made the move that was pioneered by Porsche in 1953.

The little-known designer behind the Cooper was Owen Maddock, who was employed by Cooper Car Company. Maddock was known as "The Beard" by his workmates, and "Whiskers" to Charles Cooper. Maddock was a familiar figure in the drivers' paddock of the 1950s in open-neck shirt and woolly jumper and a prime force behind the rise of British racing cars to their dominant position in the 1960s.

Describing how the revolutionary rear-engined Cooper chassis came to be, Maddock explained, "I'd done various schemes for the new car which I'd shown to Charlie Cooper. He kept saying 'Nah, Whiskers, that's not it, try again.' Finally, I got so fed up I sketched a frame in which every tube was bent, meant just as a joke. I showed it to Charlie and to my astonishment he grabbed it and said: 'That's it!' " Maddock later pioneered one of the first designs for a honeycomb monocoque stressed-skin composite chassis, and helped develop Cooper's C5S racing gearbox.

Brabham took one of the championship-winning Cooper T53 "Lowlines" to Indianapolis Motor Speedway for a test in 1960, then entered the famous 500-mile race in a larger, longer, and offset car based on the 1960 F1 design, the unique Type T54. Arriving at the Speedway 5 May 1961, the "funny" little car from Europe was mocked by the other teams, but it ran as high as third and finished ninth. It took a few years, but the Indianapolis establishment gradually realised the writing was on the wall and the days of their front-engined roadsters were numbered. Beginning with Jim Clark, who drove a rear-engined Lotus in 1965, every winner of the Indianapolis 500 since has had the engine in the back. The revolution begun by the little chain-driven Cooper 500 was complete.

Once every Formula car manufacturer began building mid-engined racers, the practicality and intelligent construction of Cooper's single-seaters was overtaken by more sophisticated technology from Lola, Lotus, BRM, and Ferrari. Changing engine regulations, down to 1500cc in 1961 and "return to power" with 3000c in 1966, also made racing difficult. The Cooper team's decline was accelerated when John Cooper was seriously injured in a road accident in 1963 driving a twin-engined Mini, and Charles Cooper died in 1964.

== Final years ==
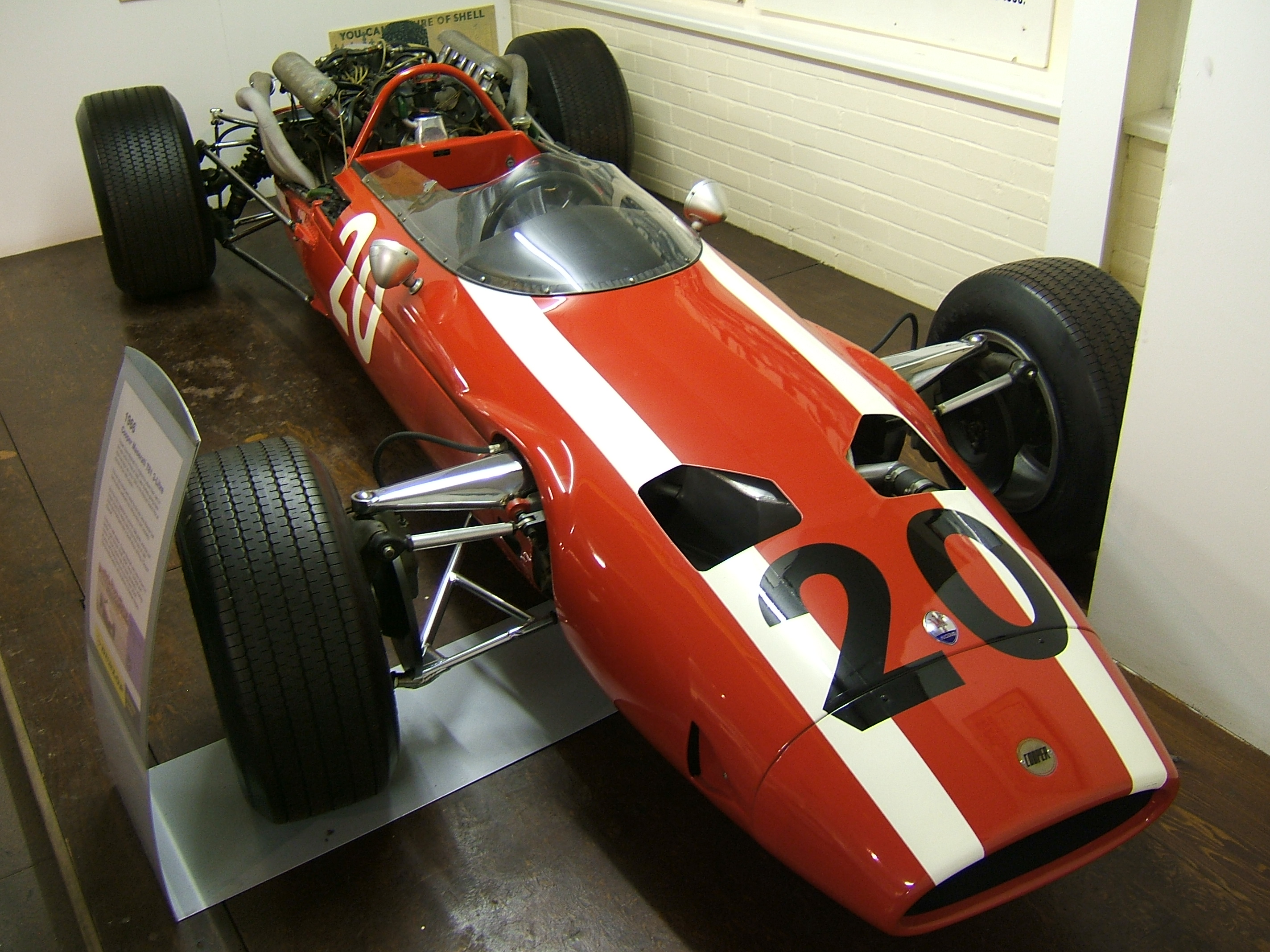
Cooper T81 Anglo-Suisse Formula One car

After the death of his father, John Cooper sold the Cooper Formula One team to the Chipstead Motor Group in April 1965. The same year, the Formula One team moved from Surbiton to a modern factory unit at Canada Road, Oyster Lane in Byfleet, just along the road from Brabham in New Haw and close to Alan Mann Racing. Cooper's 1965 season petered out and at the end of the year, number one driver Bruce McLaren left to build his own F1 car for the new for 1966 3-litre formula. Cooper's new owners held the Maserati concession for the UK and arrangements were made for Cooper to build a new 3-litre Cooper-Maserati car which would be available for sale as well being raced by the works team. The Maserati engine was an updated and enlarged version of the 2.5-litre V-12 which had made sporadic appearances in the works 250Fs in 1957. It was an old design, heavy and thirsty and the new Cooper T81 chassis built to take it was necessarily on the large side, in spite of which the bulky V-12 always looked as though it was spilling out of the back. Three cars were sold to private owners, one each to Rob Walker for Jo Siffert to drive, Jo Bonnier's Anglo Swiss Racing Team, and French privateer Guy Ligier. None of these cars achieved much success.

Jochen Rindt was entering the second year of his three-year contract, but with the departure of McLaren, Cooper had a seat to fill in the second car and with the team's recent lack of success, understandably, a large queue of potential drivers was not forming at Canada Road. In the circumstances, Cooper were fortunate to acquire the services of Honda's Richie Ginther, who was temporarily unemployed due to the Japanese company's late development of their new 3-litre car. After a couple of races, Ginther was recalled by Honda to commence testing of their new car and the American was no doubt more than somewhat chagrined to discover that it was even bigger and heavier than the Cooper. After making a one-off arrangement with Chris Amon (unemployed due to the McLaren team's engine problems) to drive in the French Grand Prix, Cooper had an enormous stroke of luck when John Surtees became available after falling out with Ferrari. Once conflicting fuel contract issues were resolved (Surtees was with Shell, Cooper with BP), Surtees joined the team. Cooper honoured its commitment to Amon, so three cars were run in the French GP. Subsequently, the team reverted to two entries for Surtees and Rindt and with the former Ferrari driver's development skills and a switch to Firestone tyres, the car was improved to the point that Surtees was able to win the final race of the year in Mexico.

Surtees left to join Honda for 1967 and Pedro Rodríguez joined Rindt in the team and immediately won the opening race of 1967 in South Africa in an unlikely Cooper one-two. This was a fortuitous win for Rodríguez, as he was being outpaced by Rhodesian John Love in his three-year-old ex McLaren Tasman Cooper powered by a 2.7-litre Coventry Climax FPF. Unfortunately, Love had to make a late pit stop for fuel and could only finish second. This was to be Cooper's last Grand Prix victory. The rest of the 1967 season had the team's fortunes steadily decline and the midseason appearance of the lighter and slimmer T86 chassis failed to improve things. Rindt, impatiently seeing out his Cooper contract, deliberately blew up his increasingly antiquated Maserati engine in the US Grand Prix and was fired before the season finale in Mexico.

For 1968, Cooper would have liked to have joined the queue for the Cosworth-Ford DFV, but felt that its connections to British Leyland with the Mini-Coopers made this inadvisable. Instead, a deal was done with BRM for the use of its 3-litre V-12, originally conceived as a sports car unit, but which BRM themselves would be using in 1968. A slightly modified version of the T86 was built for the new engine, dubbed T86B and Italian ex-Ferrari driver Ludovico Scarfiotti and young Englishman Brian Redman were employed to drive it. The cars managed three-four finishes in the Spanish and Monaco Grands Prix, largely thanks to the unreliability of the competition, but then Scarfiotti was killed driving a Porsche in the Rossfeld hill climb and Redman had a big accident in the Belgian Grand Prix which put him out of action for several months. Cooper continued the season with a motley collection of drivers, none of whom could make anything of the outclassed T86B. During the season, Cooper built a modified chassis, the T86C, intended to take an Alfa Romeo 3-litre V-8 but the project was stillborn.

The beginning of the end for the Cooper Car Company was in 1969, as it tried, and failed, to find sponsorship for a new Cosworth DFV-powered car and there were many redundancies. Frank Boyles was the last to leave, since he was in charge of building customer cars and it had been hoped that some more F2 cars would be sold. Frank went on to design and build a Formula Ford car called the Oscar and also a series of Oval Circuit cars known as Fireballs. Driving the rear-engine version of this car, Frank won more than 200 races during a period up until 1975 in a car he had designed and raced himself. This record is believed to have never been beaten.

In all, Coopers participated in 129 Formula One World Championship events in nine years, winning 16 races.

Besides Formula One cars, Cooper offered a series of Formula Junior cars. These were the T52, T56, T59, and T67 models. Ken Tyrrell ran a very successful team with John Love and Tony Maggs as his drivers. Following the demise of Formula Junior, Ken Tyrrell tested Jackie Stewart in a Formula Three car, a Cooper T72. This test at the Goodwood Circuit marked the start of partnership which dominated motorsport later on.

John Cooper retired to the Sussex coast, where in 1971 he founded a garage business at Ferring, near Worthing. The garage sold Mini Cooper engine-tuning kits and performance parts.

The garage was sold to Honda in 1986 and the business was moved to East Preston to convert Mini Coopers into race cars.

In October 2009, Mike Cooper, the son of John Cooper, launched Cooper Bikes, the bicycle division of the Cooper Car Company.

== Mini legacy ==
As the company's fortunes in Formula One declined, however, the John Cooper-conceived Mini – introduced in 1961 as a development of the Alec Issigonis-designed British Motor Corporation Mini with a more powerful engine, new brakes, and a distinctive livery – continued to dominate in saloon car and rally races throughout the 1960s, winning many championships and the 1964, 1965, and 1967 Monte Carlo rallies.

Several different Cooper-marked versions of the Mini and various Cooper conversion kits have been, and continue to be, marketed by various companies. The current BMW Mini, in production since 2001, has Cooper and Cooper S models and a number of John Cooper Works tuner packages.

== Cooper garage ==
On 1 April 1968, John Cooper leased a building at 243 Ewell Road to the Metropolitan Police and the local traffic division (V Victor) moved in. They would stay there for the next 25 years and TDV would become one of the busier police garages. In August 1968, they were supplied with two Mini Coopers, index numbers PYT767F and PYT768F. The centre boss of the steering wheel was replaced by a speaker and microphone, and a push-to-talk transmitter switch was added to the steering column. The vehicles were trialled for a number of months, but no orders were placed for other garages. The police subsequently moved out, and the building became a Porsche dealership.

== Gallery ==
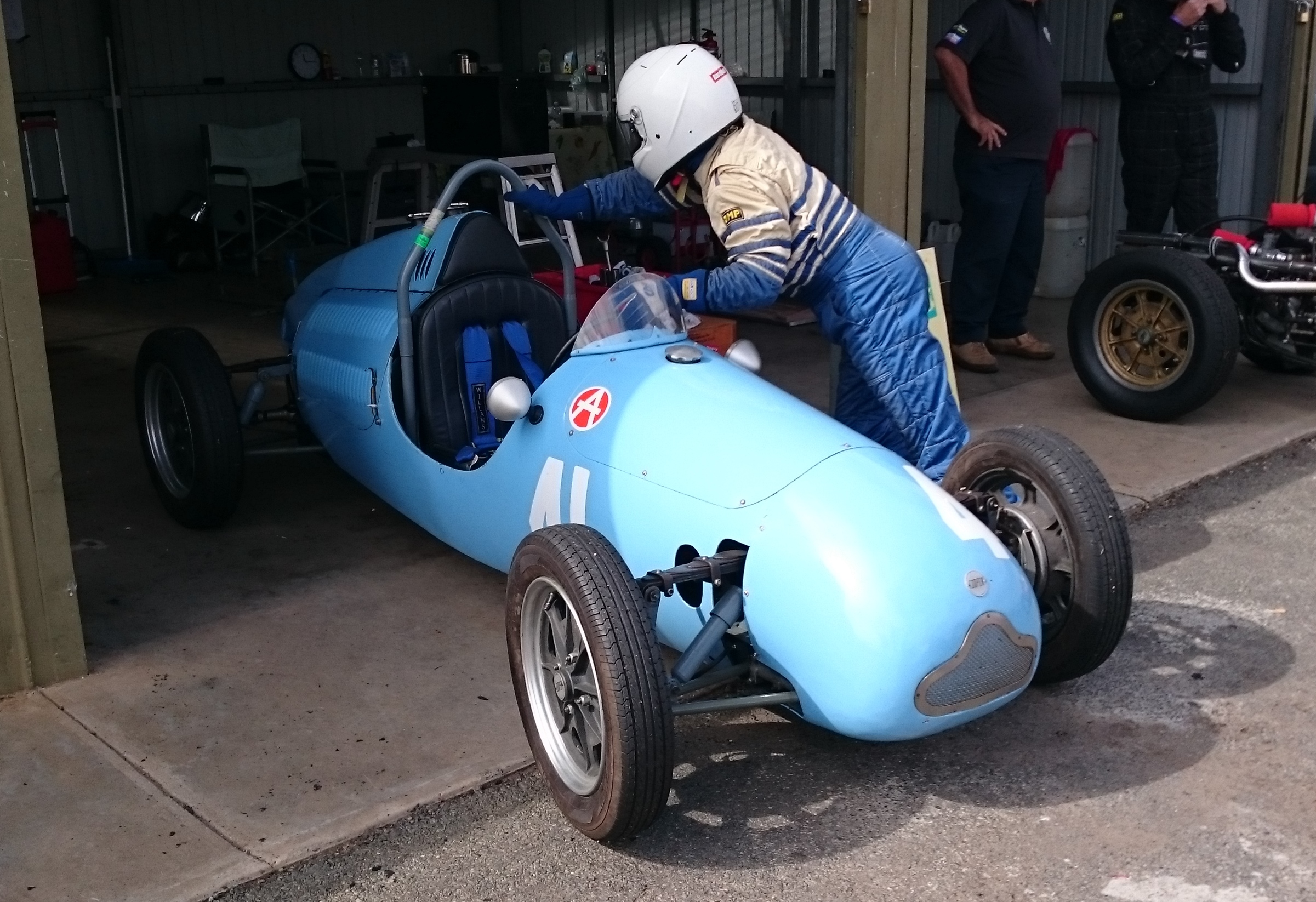
Cooper Mk IV of circa 1950

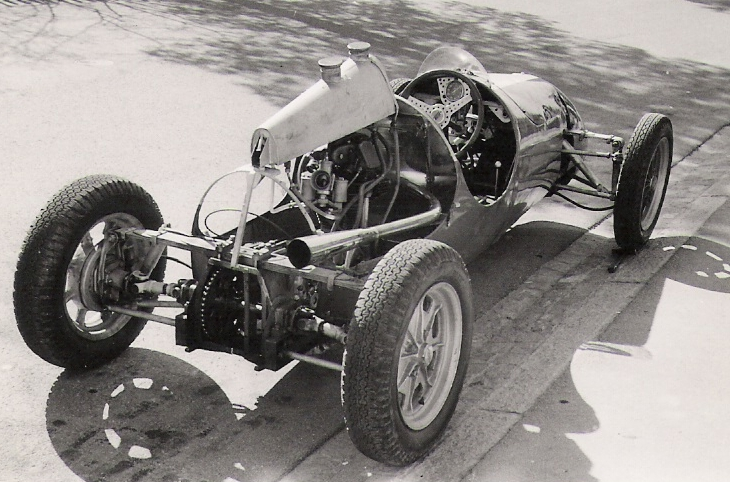
Cooper with 500-cc Norton Manx engine

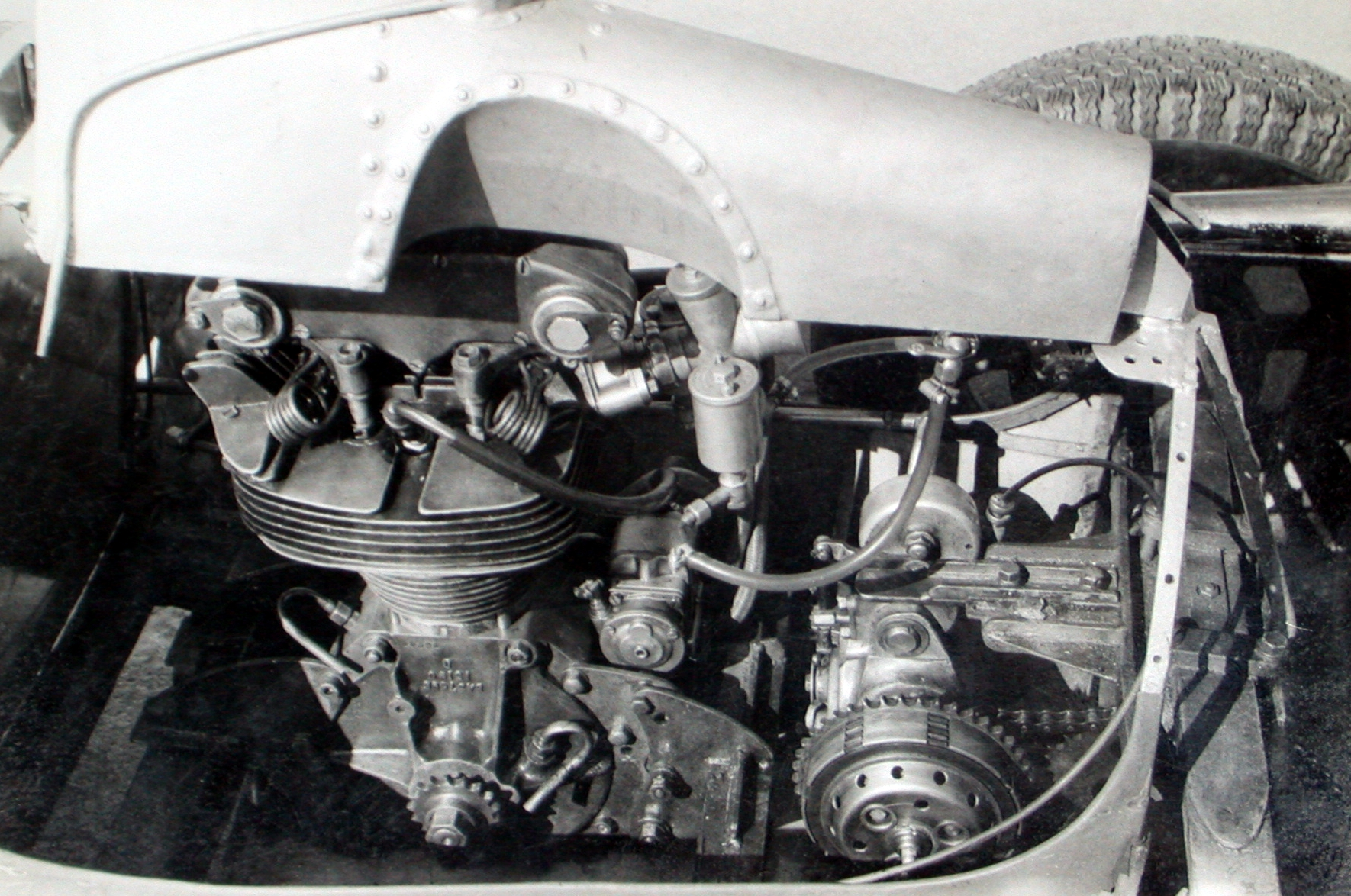
Norton Manx Engine

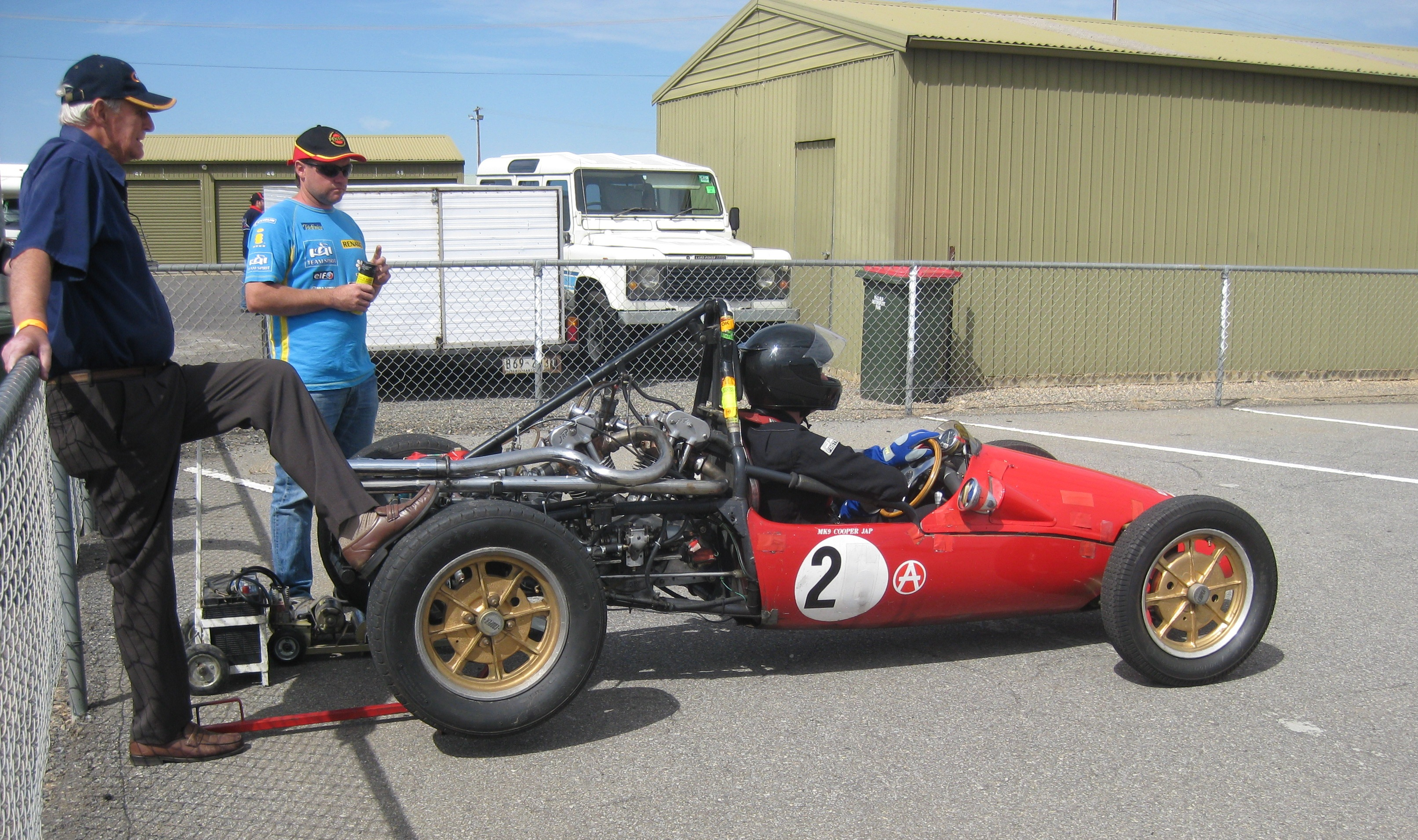
Cooper Mark IX of 1956: This example is powered by an 1100-cc JAP engine.

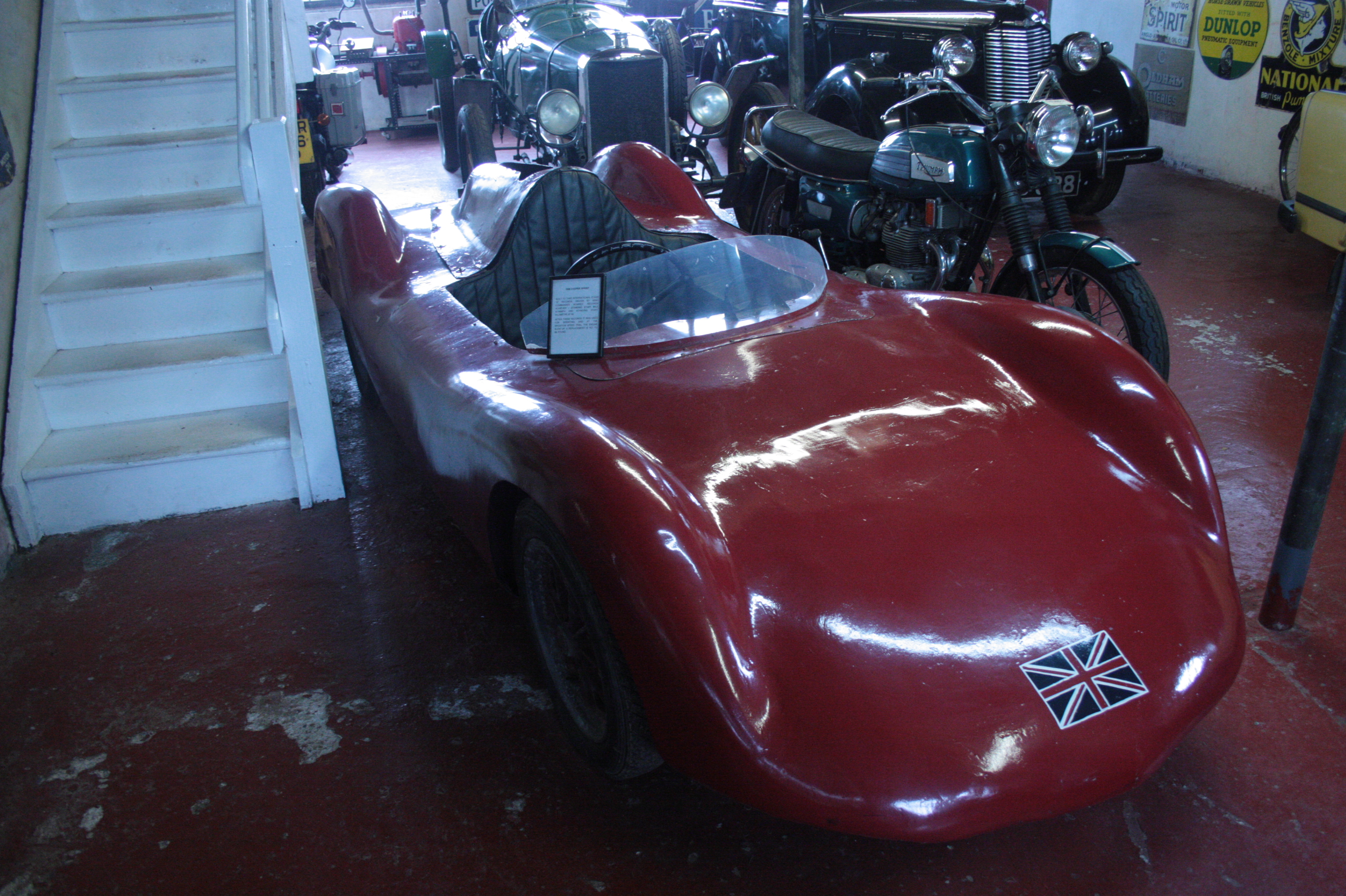
1956 Cooper Sprint, Myreton Motor Museum

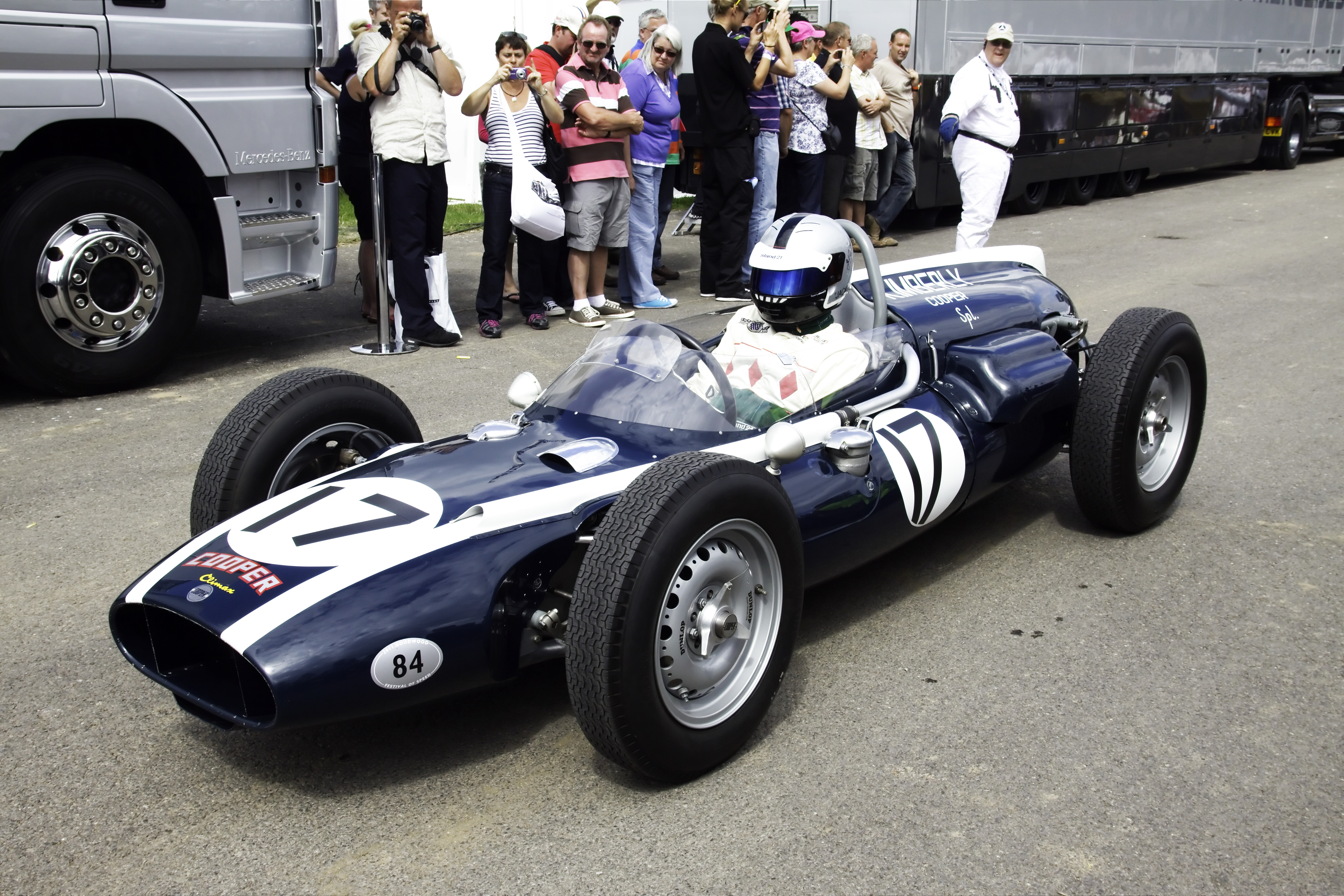
The Cooper T54 which competed in the 1961 Indianapolis 500

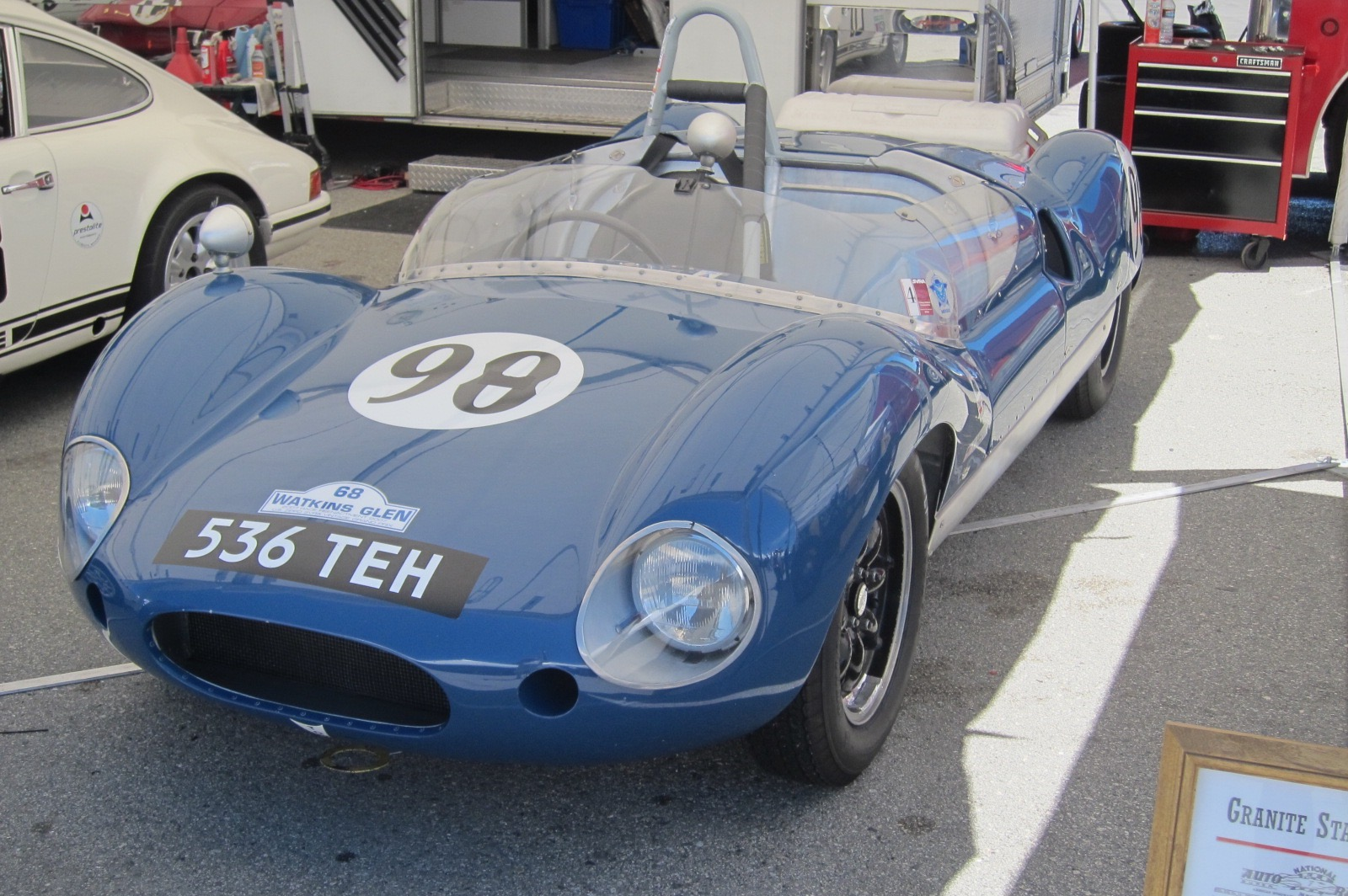
Cooper Monaco

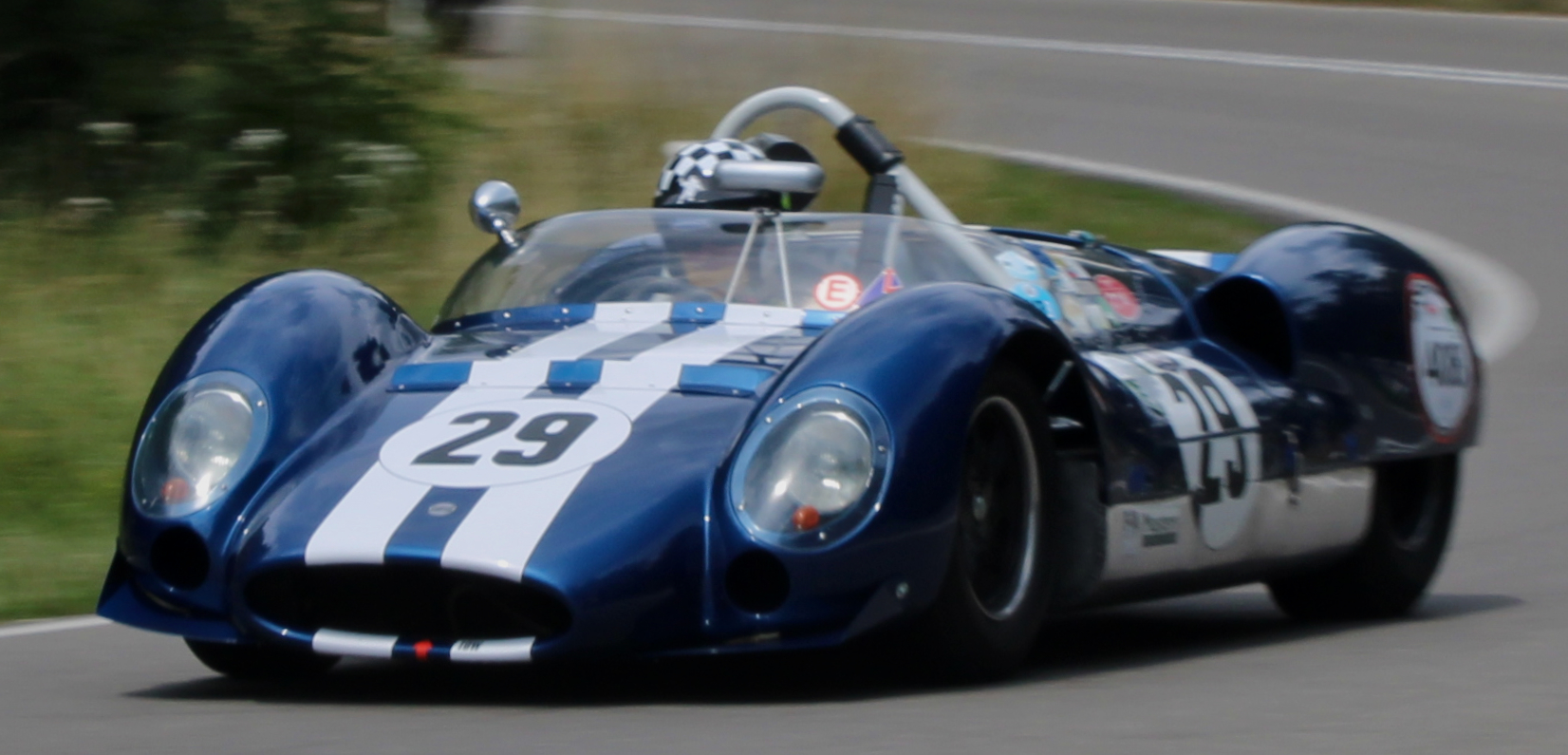
Cooper Monaco King Cobra T61M

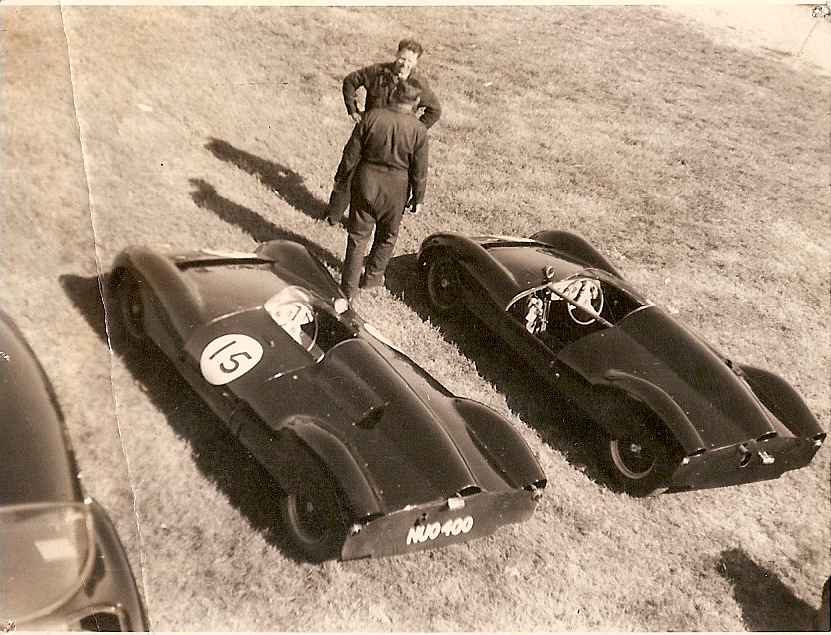
Cooper T39/Climax cars Goodwood 30 May 1955, Equipe Endeavour Chief Mechanic John Crosthwaite facing cars

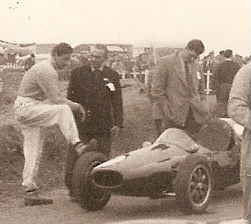
1956 Silverstone GP Formula 2 race winner Roy Salvadori with foot on tyre of Cooper T41

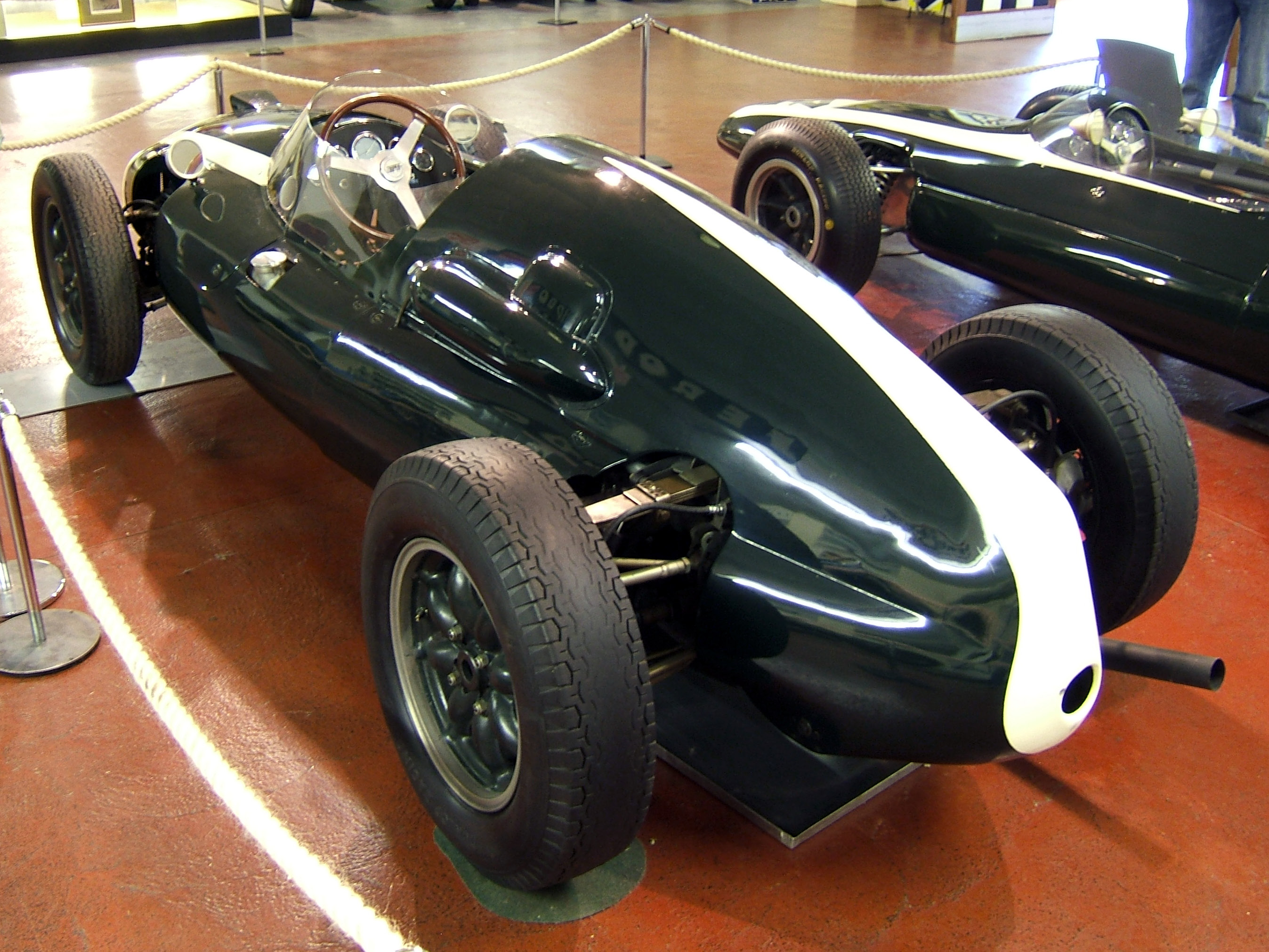
A rear three-quarter picture of a Cooper T51, the first World Championship-winning mid-engined Formula One car

Sporting positions
| Preceded by Vanwall | Formula One Constructors' Champion; 1959-1960 | Succeeded by Ferrari |
