= Beaulieu, Hampshire =

Village in Hampshire, England

Coordinates: 50°49′06″N 1°27′07″W

Beaulieu
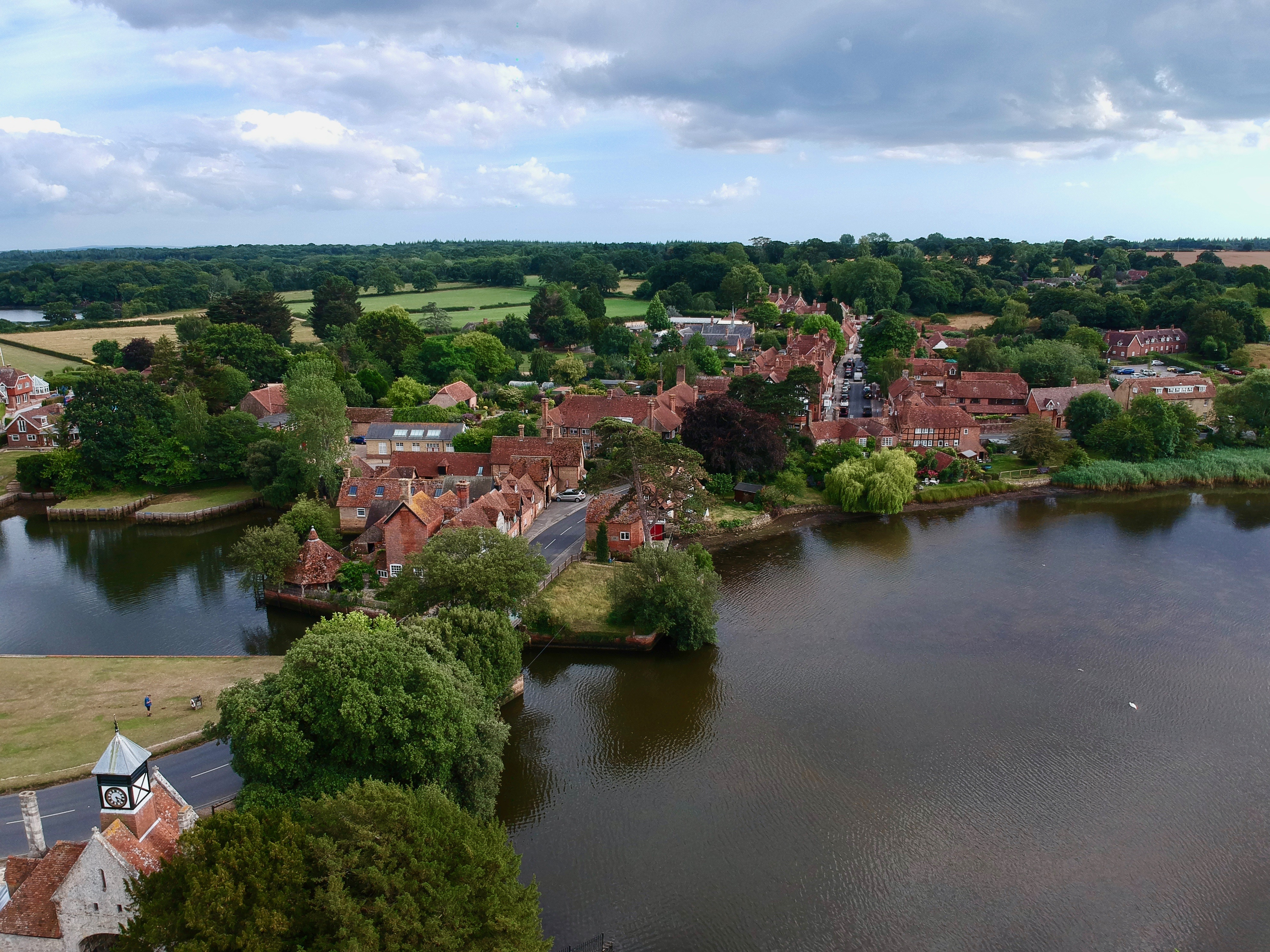
- Aerial view of Beaulieu

- Location within Hampshire
- Population: 806 (2011 census)
- OS grid reference: SU385025
  - London: 92.6mi
- Civil parish: Beaulieu
- District: New Forest
- Shire county: Hampshire
- Region: South East
- Country: England
- Sovereign state: United Kingdom
- Post town: Brockenhurst
- Postcode district: SO42
- Dialling code: 01590
- Police: Hampshire and Isle of Wight
- Fire: Hampshire and Isle of Wight
- Ambulance: South Central
- UK Parliament: New Forest East

Beaulieu (/ˈbjuːli/ BEW-lee) is a village located on the southeastern edge of the New Forest in Hampshire, England. It is home to both Palace House and the National Motor Museum. In 2020, it was named the fifth most beautiful village in the UK and Ireland by Condé Nast Traveler.

== History ==
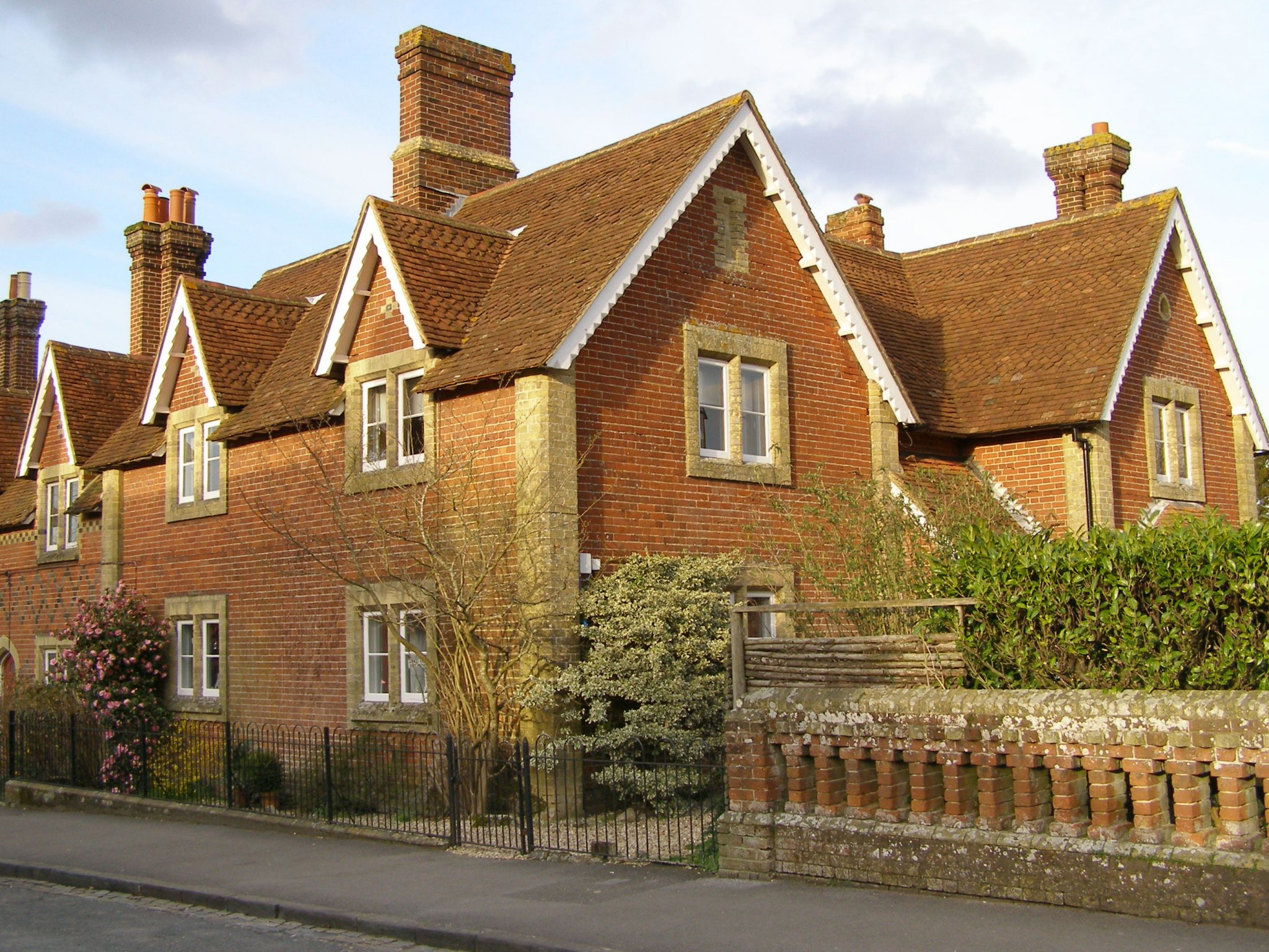
Buccleuch Cottages, the most typical local architectural style

The name "Beaulieu" comes from the French beau lieu, which means "beautiful place". It is derived from Beaulieu Abbey, which was populated by 30 monks sent from the French abbey of Cîteaux, the mother house of the Cistercian order. The medieval Latin name of the monastery was Bellus Locus Regis ("the beautiful place of the king") or monasterium Belli loci Regis.

During the Second World War, the Beaulieu Estate of Lord Montagu in the New Forest was the site of group B schools for agents operated by the Special Operations Executive (SOE) between 1941 and 1945. One of the trainers was Kim Philby, who was later found to be spying for the Soviets. In 2005, a special exhibition was installed at the Beaulieu Estate, with a video showing photographs from that era as well as voice recordings of former SOE trainers and agents.

The village has remained largely unspoilt by industrial progress and is a favourite stop for tourists in the area, as well as birdwatchers seeking local species like the Dartford warbler, European honey buzzard, and Eurasian hobby.

== Palace House ==
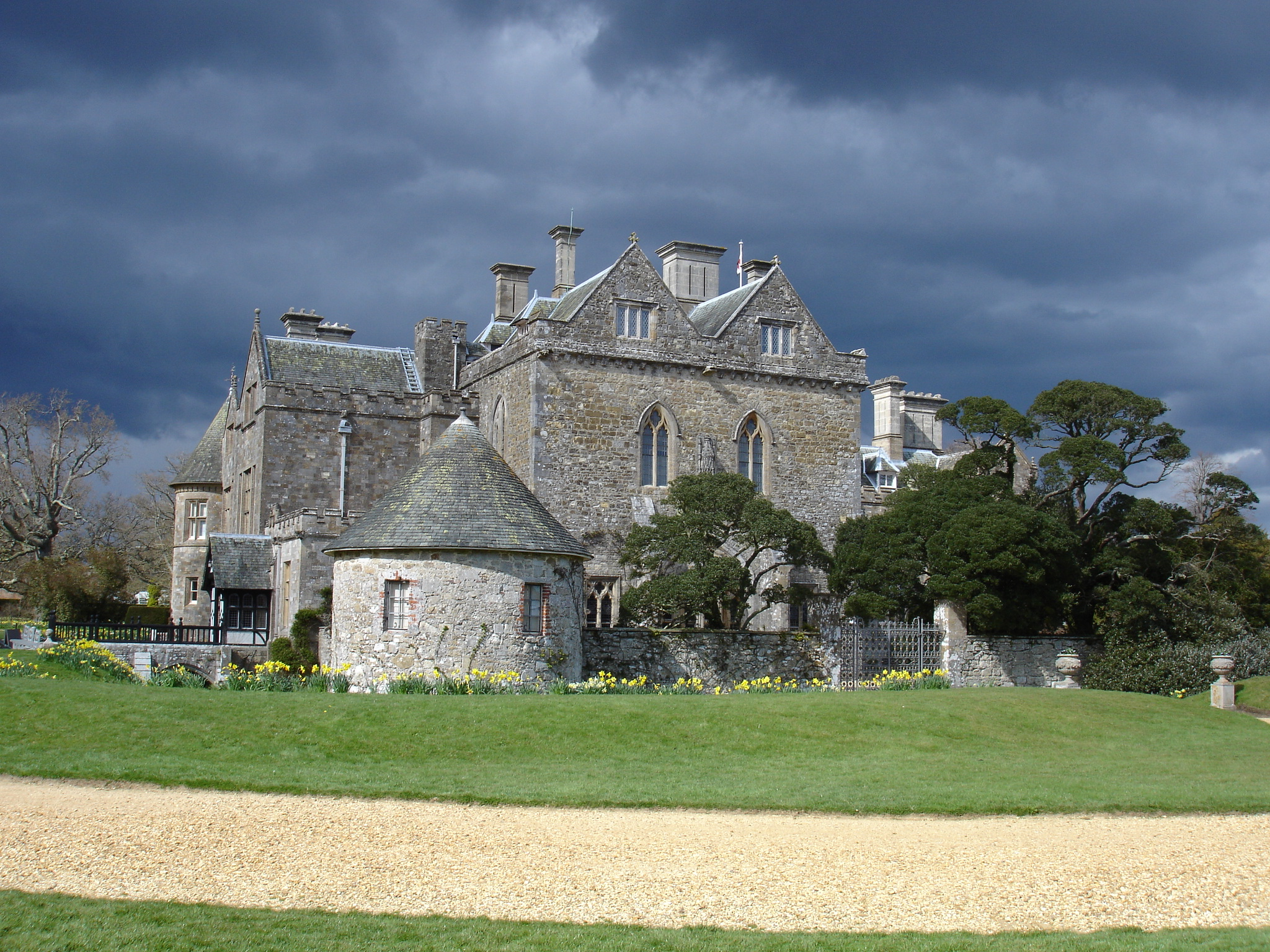
Palace House

Palace House, not to be confused with the Palace of Beaulieu in Essex, overlooks the village from across the Beaulieu River and began in 1204 as the gatehouse to Beaulieu Abbey. It has been the ancestral home of a branch of the Montagu family since 1538, when it was seized from the monks and sold during Henry VIII's dissolution of the monasteries.

The house was extended in the 16th century, and again in the 19th century; today, it is a fine example of a Gothic country house. Although still home to the current Lord and Lady Montagu, parts of the house and gardens are open to the public every day. It is a member of the Treasure Houses of England consortium.

== Culture ==
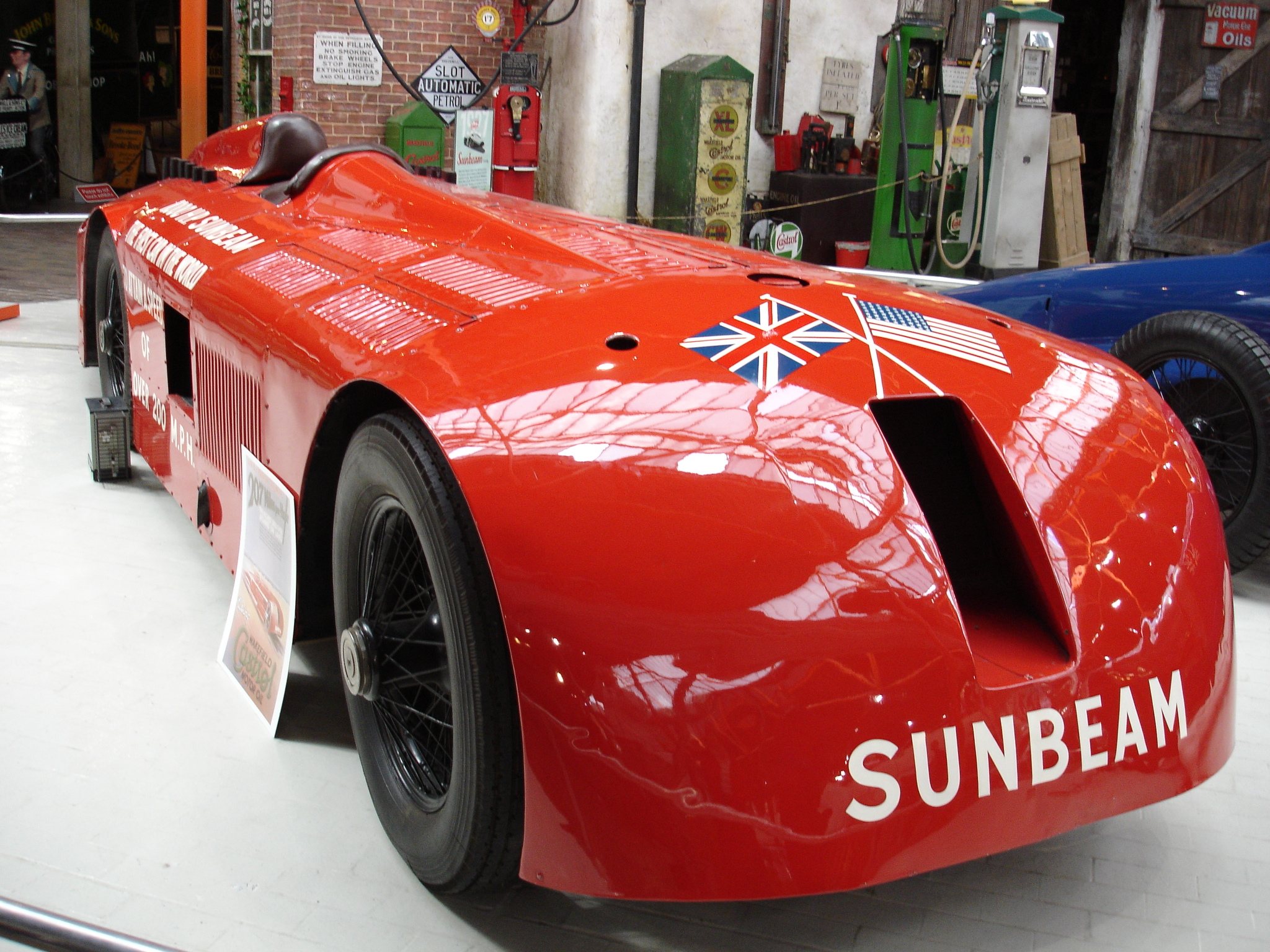
Sunbeam 1000HP

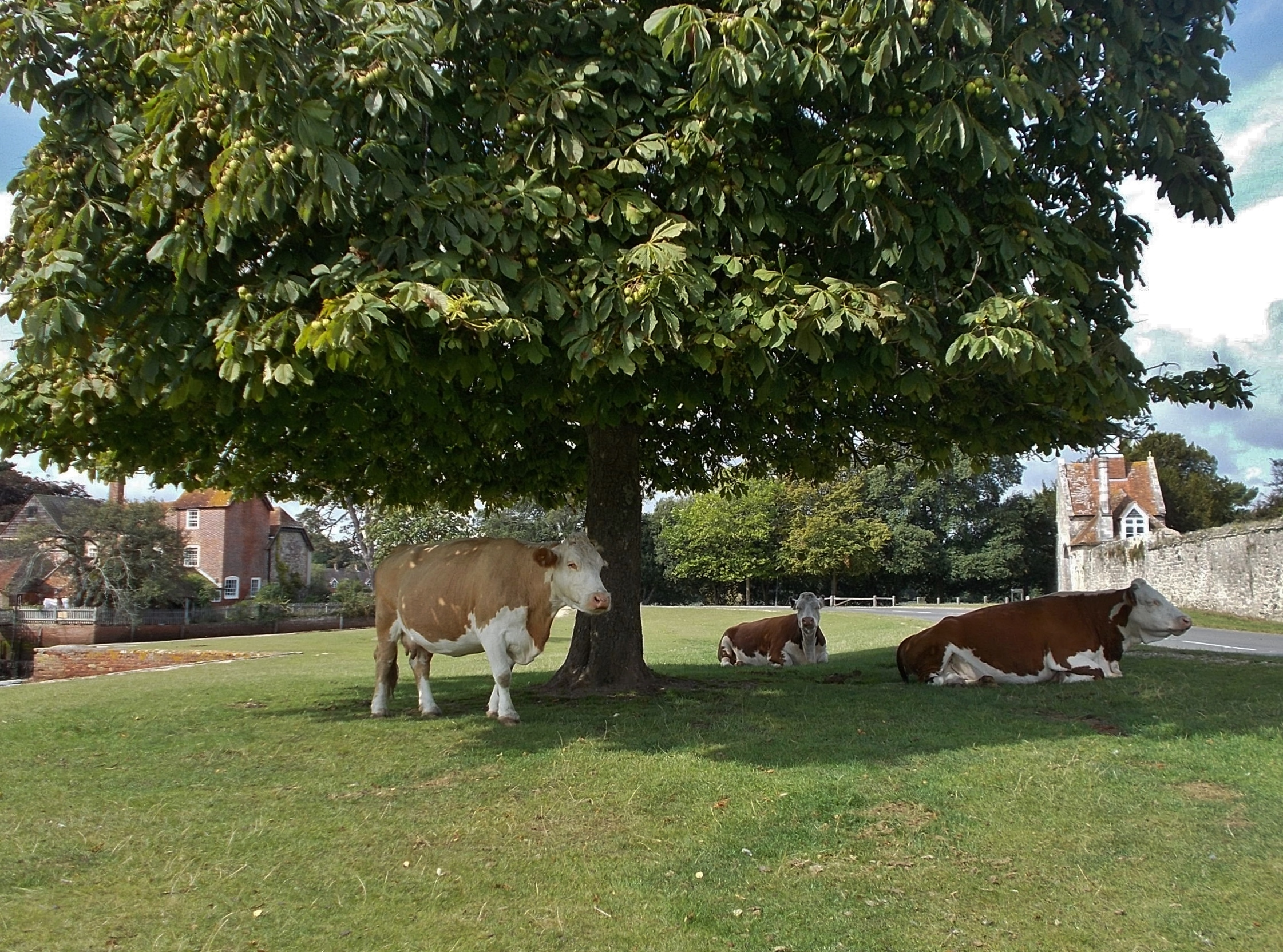
Cows in Beaulieu

The village is home to the National Motor Museum, opened in 1952 as the Montagu Motor Museum before becoming a charitable trust in 1972. It contains an important collection of historic motor vehicles, including four world land speed record holders: Sir Malcolm Campbell's 1920 Sunbeam 350hp, his son Donald Campbell's 1961 Bluebird-Proteus CN7, the 1927 Sunbeam 1000hp (the first motor car to reach 200 miles per hour (322 km/h)), and the 1929 Irving-Napier Special 'Golden Arrow'. The latter two were both driven by Major Henry Segrave.

In the late 1950s, Beaulieu was the surprising location for one of Britain's first experiments in pop festival culture, with the annual Beaulieu Jazz Festival, which quickly expanded to become a significant event in the burgeoning jazz and youth pop music scene of the period. Camping overnight, a rural invasion, eccentric dress, wild music and sometimes wilder behaviour; these now familiar features of pop festivals happened at Beaulieu each summer, culminating in the so-called 'Battle of Beaulieu' at the 1960 festival, when rival gangs of modern and traditional jazz fans indulged in a spot of what sociologists went on to call 'subcultural contestation'.

== See also ==
- List of jazz festivals
- List of historic rock festivals

== Bibliography ==
- Lord Montagu of Beaulieu (2000) Wheels Within Wheels: An Unconventional Life. London: Weidenfeld and Nicolson.
- George McKay (2004) '"Unsafe things like youth and jazz": Beaulieu Jazz Festivals (1956–61) and the origins of pop festival culture in Britain'. In Andy Bennett, ed. Remembering Woodstock (Aldershot: Ashgate).
- George McKay (2005) Circular Breathing: The Cultural Politics of Jazz in Britain, chapter one 'New Orleans jazz, protest (Aldermaston) and carnival (Beaulieu [Jazz Festival 1956-61])'. Durham NC: Duke University Press.
