= Sunbeam Cossack =

1910s British piston aircraft engine

Cossack
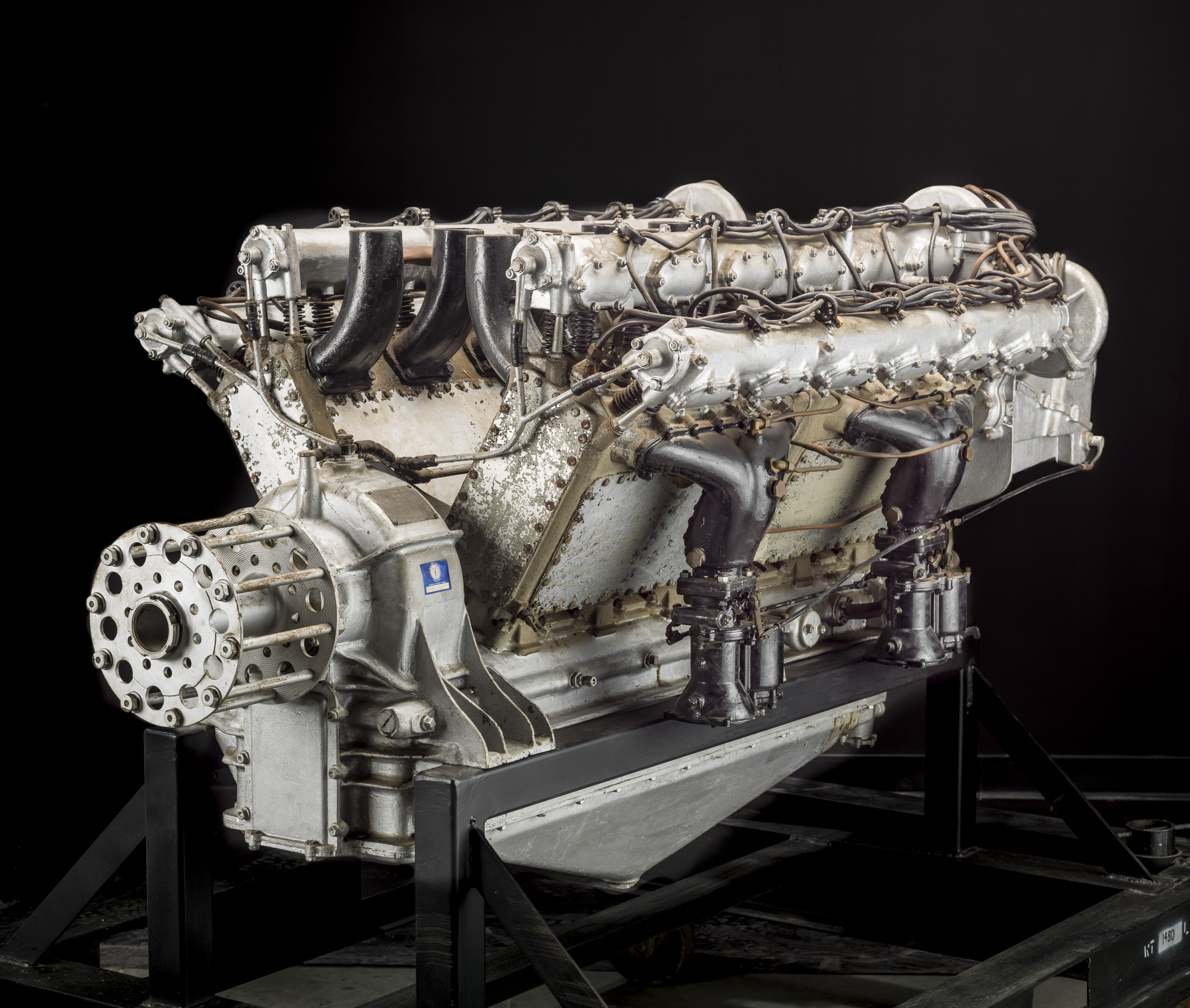
- Sunbeam Cossack at the National Air and Space Museum
- Type: V12, 60-degree, water-cooled, piston engine
- National origin: Britain
- Manufacturer: Sunbeam
- Designer: Louis Coatalen
- First run: 1916
- Major applications: Short Type 310
- Manufactured: 1916–1920
- Number built: UK 350; France 150; US 1+? Cossack III 14
- Variants: Sunbeam Matabele

The Sunbeam Cossack was a British 12-cylinder aero engine that was first run in 1916. The Cossack spawned a family of engines from Sunbeam.

== Design and development ==
As the First World War raged through 1914 and 1915, The Admiralty demanded engines with more power for its existing and future aircraft. The problem was exemplified by the Short Type 184 seaplanes of the RNAS, powered by Sunbeam Mohawk engines, which could barely lift the standard air-dropped torpedo with crew reduced to two and minimal fuel. An engine with a base rating of at least 300 hp (224 kW) was demanded by the Admiralty. Responses came from Rolls-Royce with the Rolls-Royce Eagle and Sunbeam with the Sunbeam Cossack.

Louis Coatalen designed the Cossack as a twin overhead camshaft 60° V12, with four valves per cylinder, bore of 110 mm (4 in) and stroke of 130 mm (5 in). Output from the Cossack was 310 hp (231 kW) at 2,000rpm, with a running weight of 1,372.5 lb (623 kg), driving a large diameter propeller through a 2:1 reduction gear. Construction of the Cossack was largely of aluminium alloy with cast-iron cylinder blocks and integral heads in groups of three.

Large orders were placed for the Cossack but deliveries were very slow, with only eleven, largely hand-built, engines delivered from March 1916 to September 1916. The end of Sunbeam Gurkha production in October 1916 freed up factory resources to allow up to thirty engines a month to be delivered until Cossack production ended in December 1917 after 350 deliveries.

Development of the basic engine produced the Sunbeam Cossack II with four magnetos, to counter the unreliability of British contemporary magnetos, and a compressed-air or hand driven starter, rated at 320 hp (239 kW).

Late in the First World War Britain's airship aspirations were boosted by the order for the R36, R37 and R38. All three airships were powered by a variety of engines including the Sunbeam Cossack III a derivative of the Cossack with a flywheel, hand or air starter, engine controls and magnetos mounted directly on the engine for access by the engine mechanics. The Cossack 3 was designed with a water-cooled exhaust and speed governor. The overhead camshaft was gear driven from the crankshaft. Only 14 Cossack IIIs were built due to the cancellation of the post-war British airships.

== Amazon ==
In similar fashion to other engine families designed by Coatalen the Cossack spawned a straight-six derivative in the Amazon, in effect half a Cossack, retaining the 110 x 160mm bore/stroke, overhead camshaft, four poppet valves per cylinder and cast-iron cylinder blocks in groups of three. An output of 160 hp (119 kW) from 9.2 L (561 cu in) for a running weight of 747 lb (339 kg) led to a high power to weight ratio. Despite the high output the Amazon was little used in Britain, with only possible use aboard Coastal airships and some supplied to the Imperial Russian Air Service. Amazon production totalled 77 out of an order for 100, 23 of which were cancelled. A non-aviation use version of the Amazon was produced as the Sunbeam Amazon II, fitted with hand and/or compressed-air starters and single magneto ignition system.

== Saracen ==
Development paths favoured by Coatalen included increasing the bore and Aluminium alloy cylinder blocks. Aluminium alloy cylinder blocks and the bore increased to 122 mm (5 in), the capacity increased to 11.23 L (685 cu in) to produce the Sunbeam Saracen straight-six. Delivering 200 hp (149 kW) at 2,000 rpm, driving a propeller through a 2:1 reduction gear. When submitted to the Internal Combustion Engine Committee of the National Advisory Committee for Aeronautics the Saracen faced stiff competition from the Beardmore 160 hp and Hispano-Suiza 8 and did not attract any orders. Only prototypes of the Saracen were built.

== Viking ==
To extract more power from the Cossack lineage Coatalen designed a W-18 version known as the Sunbeam Viking. This engine used Cossack blocks in a W arrangement with 60° between banks having a capacity of 33.6 L (2,050 cu in) giving 450 hp (336 kW) at a propeller speed of 900 rpm. Orders for 50 engines were received, intended to power the large AD Seaplane Type 1000 aircraft, but most of the nine engines produced were fitted to motor boats, the remaining 41 being cancelled.

== Matabele ==
The final fling of the Cossack family was the Sunbeam Matabele, retaining the Aluminium alloy blocks and 122 mm (5 in) bore of the Saracen the V12 Matabele delivered 420 hp (313 kW) at 2,000rpm through a 1.63:1 reduction gear from 9.2 L (561 cu in). Developed in two versions, the Sunbeam Matabele I, for aviation use, was fitted with four magnetos to provide redundancy for the dual ignition system, whilst the Sunbeam Matabele II was only fitted with two magnetos supplying a single ignition system for non-aviation use. Used mainly in Airco DH.4 bombers, the Matabele also found favour as a power-boat and speed-record car engine. No Matabeles were built during the First World War, but prototypes and at least eight production engines were built after the war for various applications.

=== Sunbeam 1000 hp ===
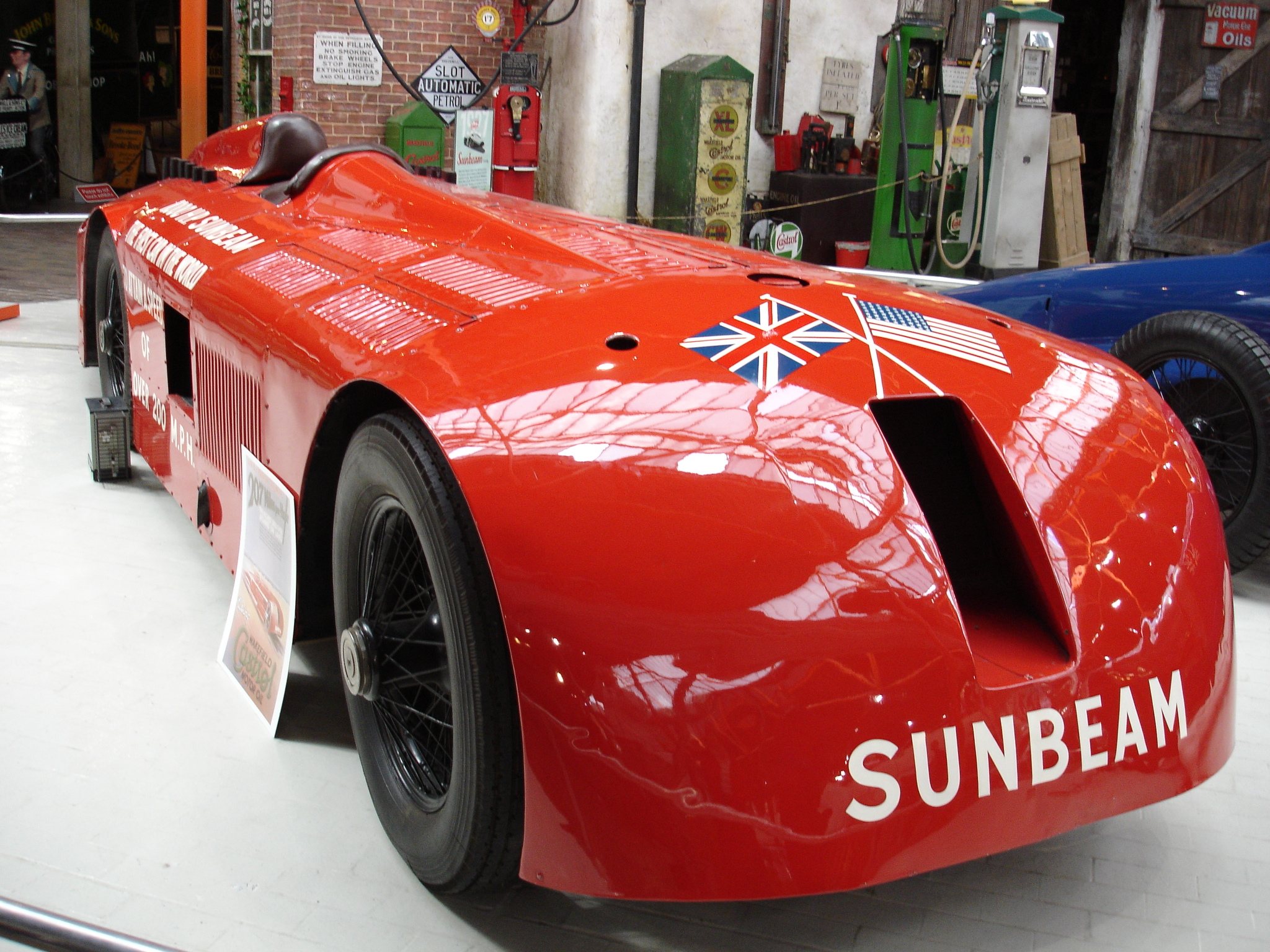
The Sunbeam 1000 hp on display at the National Motor Museum Beaulieu

The Matabele engine is best known today for powering the Sunbeam 1000 hp land speed record car, the first car to exceed 200 mph.

After taking the land speed record at 152.33 mph (245 km/h) with the Sunbeam Tiger, Segrave realised that his small, lightweight racing car would be inadequate to hold the record against the aero-engined leviathans now appearing in the contest. The S.T.D. Motors team was short of funds and so little new development was possible.

A pair of Matabele engines were found in the Sunbeam works at Wolverhampton, previously from the ill-fated Maple Leaf VII powerboat. As the Sunbeam 1000 HP is reported as having 4 magnetos per engine, these would appear to be Matabele I, rather than Matabele II engines.

On 29 March 1927, the Sunbeam became the first car to exceed 200 mph. Although loudly trumpeted as the "1000 HP" Sunbeam, the actual power was somewhere around 900 bhp.

The installation of these engines was somewhat unorthodox, necessitated by the limited funds for new work. The rear engine was started first by compressed air starting, then the front engine was started through a mechanical friction clutch. Once synchronised, they were locked together with a dog clutch for the record attempt. The car's last run was a demonstration circuit at Brooklands, running at slow speed on only one engine, with this dog clutch disconnected.

== Variants ==
Cossack I
The basic production V12 engine with cast-iron blocks, 110 mm (4 in) bore and single ignition system fed by two magnetos. Rated at 310 hp (231 kW) at 2,000rpm.
Cossack II
An improved Cossack with dual ignition system and hand / compressed air starter. Rated at 320 hp (239 kW) at 2,000rpm.
Cossack 3
Built for airship use. Produced 350 hp at 2,000 rpm and weighed 1,200 lb (540 kg) dry.
Amazon
A straight six version of the Cossack retaining the dual ignition system, bore and stroke and cast-iron blocks in groups of three. Rated at 160 hp (119 kW) at 2,000rpm.
Amazon II
A non-aviation use version of the Amazon with single ignition system. Rated at 160 hp (119 kW) at 2,000 rpm.
Saracen
In the Saracen, Coatalen increased the bore to 122 mm (5 in) and changed construction to Aluminium alloy blocks. Rated at 160 hp (119 kW) at 2,000 rpm the Saracen failed to gain any orders, only prototypes being built.
Viking
The Viking was a W-18 using the blocks of the Cossack and retaining its attributes. Intended for the AD.1000 floatplane for the RNAS. Production of the 50 ordered was halted after nine had been built; those not used in the sole AD.1000 built were fitted to motor-boats.
Matabele I
The Matabele I was a v-12 engine with similar aluminium alloy blocks to the Saracen, as well as the larger bore of 122 mm (5 in), rated at 160 hp (119 kW) at 2,000 rpm. Intended for general aviation use the Matabele I had a dual ignition system with four magnetos.
Matabele II
For non-aviation use the Matabele II had a single ignition system and compressed-air / hand starters. This engine found favour powering motor-boats.

== Applications ==
- AD Seaplane Type 1000 (Cossack and Viking)
- Short Type 310 (Cossack)
- Porte Baby FB.2 (Cossack)
- Felixstowe F.3 (Cossack)
- Handley Page Type O/400 (Cossack)
- Tellier Flying boat (Cossack)
- HM Airship R36 (Cossack III)
- HM Airship R37 (Cossack III) Airship scrapped when 95% complete
- HM Airship R38 (Cossack III) (R38 class discontinued)
- Coastal class blimp C-14 (Amazon?)
- Thorneycroft Coastal motor-boats (Viking)
- Airco DH.4 (Matabele II)
- Sunbeam Despujois I – motor boat (Matabele II)
- Sunbeam Despujois II – motor boat (Matabele II)
- Sunbeam Despujois IV – motor boat (Matabele II)
- Sunbeam Despujois V – motor boat (Matabele II)
- Maple Leaf VII – Sir Edward Mackay Edgar's 1921 Saunders- built motor boat (Matabele II)
- Sunbeam 1000 hp – speed record breaking car (Matabele I)

== Specifications (Cossack II) ==
Data from Sunbeam Aero-Engines

=== General characteristics ===
- Type: V12 water-cooled piston engine
- Bore: 110 mm (4 in)
- Stroke: 160 mm (6 in)
- Displacement: 18.246 L (1,113 cu in)
- Length: 1,569 mm (62 in)
- Width: 960 mm (38 in)
- Height: 988 mm (39 in)
- Dry weight: 622.5 kg (1,372 lb) Running
- Designer: Louis Coatalen

=== Components ===
- Valvetrain: Twin overhead camshaft, two exhaust and two inlet valves per cylinder
- Fuel system: 4 x Claudel-Hobson CS 42 mm (2 in) bore carburettors, gravity fed
- Fuel type: Gasoline
- Oil system: Dry sump, pressure fed
- Cooling system: Water-cooled by radiator
- Reduction gear: 2:1

=== Performance ===
- Power output: 238.6 kW (320 hp) at 2,000rpm

== See also ==
Comparable engines

- Rolls-Royce Eagle
- Rolls-Royce Falcon

Related lists

- List of aircraft engines
