= Sunbeam Matabele =

1910s British piston aircraft engine

Matabele
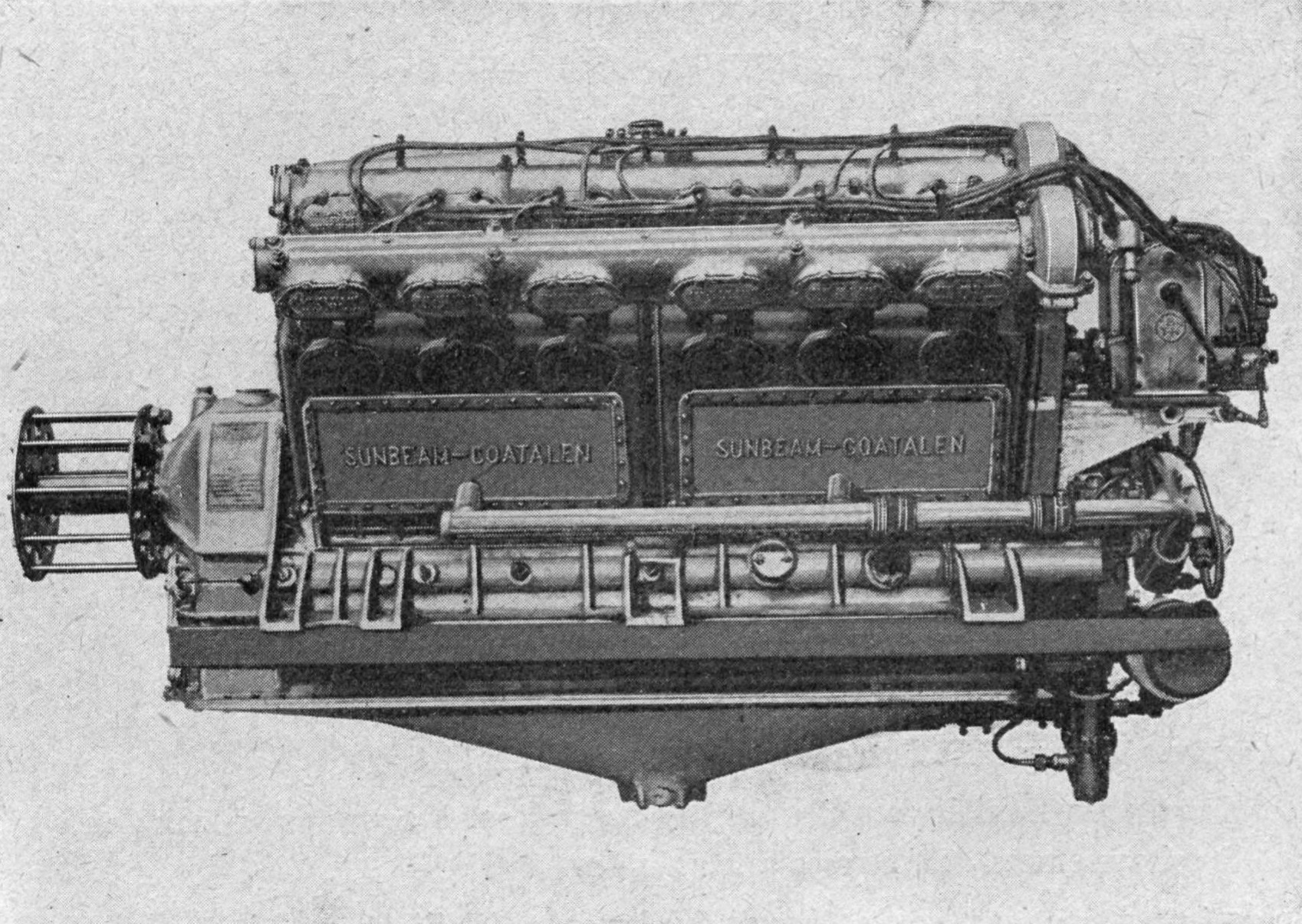
- Sunbeam Matabele 420 hp, from L'Année Aéronautique: 1920-1921
- Type: Piston Inline aero-engine
- Manufacturer: Sunbeam
- Designer: Louis Coatalen
- First run: May 1918
- Major applications: Airco DH.4

The Sunbeam Matabele was a British 12-cylinder aero engine that was first flown in 1918. The Matabele was the last iteration of one of Sunbeam's most successful aero engines, the Cossack.

== Design and development ==
The Cossack was a twin overhead camshaft V12, with four valves per cylinder. The Matabele fitted this with two of the blocks from the Saracen, using aluminium instead of the Cossack's cast iron. The Saracen's bore was slightly larger at 122 mm (from the Cossack's 110 mm) and with the same stroke of 160 mm this gave a capacity of 22.4 litres (1,370 cu in). Ignition was by four magnetos (two per bank), with twin sparkplugs. A propeller reduction gear of 1.63:1 was fitted.

== Variants ==
Matabele II

A simplified engine was developed for non-aircraft use. This avoided the propeller reduction gearbox and had a single magneto per bank, rather than the duplicated magneto and sparkplug systems usual in aircraft for reliability. This engine was aimed at the developing market for racing powerboats.

== Applications ==
The Matabele was tested successfully in a DH.4 from May 1918. The only order for the engine, however, came from France, where the engine was used to power the Nieuport-Delage NiD 30 airliner.

=== Sunbeam 1000 hp ===
The Matabele engine is best known today for having powered the Sunbeam 1000 hp land speed record car, the first car to exceed 200 mph (320 km/h).

After taking the land speed record at 152.33 mph (245.15 km/h) with the Sunbeam Tiger, Segrave realised that his small, lightweight racing car would be inadequate to hold the record against the aero-engined leviathans now appearing in the contest. The S.T.D. Motors team was short of funds and so little new development was possible.

A pair of Matabele engines were found in the Sunbeam works at Wolverhampton, previously from a powerboat. The Sunbeam 1000HP has 4 magnetos per engine, these would appear to be Matabele I, rather than Matabele II.

On 29 March 1927, the Sunbeam became the first car to exceed 200 mph (320 km/h). Although loudly trumpeted as the "1000 HP" Sunbeam, the actual power was somewhere around 900 bhp (670 kW).

The installation of these engines was somewhat unorthodox, necessitated by the limited funds for new work. The rear engine was started first by compressed air, then the front engine was started through a mechanical friction clutch. Once synchronised, they were locked together with a dog clutch for the record attempt. The car's last run was a demonstration circuit at Brooklands, running at slow speed on only one engine, with this dog clutch disconnected.

== Specifications (Matabele) ==
Data from Lumsden

=== General characteristics ===
- Type: 12-cylinder naturally aspirated liquid-cooled "Vee" piston aircraft engine
- Bore: 122 mm (4.8 in)
- Stroke: 160 mm (6.3 in)
- Displacement: 22.4 L (1,367 in^{3})
- Dry weight: 1,091 lb (495 kg) wet

=== Components ===
- Valvetrain: Twin overhead camshaft, twin intake and twin exhaust valve per cylinder
- Fuel system: Two Claudel-Hobson HC.7 carburettors
- Cooling system: water
- Reduction gear: 1.63:1

=== Performance ===
- Power output: 400 hp (300 kW) at 2,000 rpm
- Specific power: 13.4 kW/litre

== See also ==
Comparable engines

- Rolls-Royce Eagle

Related lists

- List of aircraft engines
