= Andrew Jenkins (songwriter) =

American singer-songwriter

- Also known as: Blind Andy, Gooby Jenkins, The Blind Newsboy Evangelist
- Born: November 26, 1885
- Origin: Atlanta, Georgia, United States
- Died: April 25, 1957 (aged 71)
- Genres: Country, folk, gospel
- Occupations: Musician, singer, songwriter, preacher
- Instruments: Acoustic guitar, mandolin, banjo, harmonica
- Years active: circa. 1916–1934
- Labels: Okeh Records
- Formerly of: Jenkins Family, Jenkins Sacred Singers, Irene Spain Family, Carson Robison

The Rev. Andrew W. Jenkins (November 26, 1885 – April 25, 1957) was a leading composer of American country, folk and gospel songs. Jenkins is credited with more than 800 compositions, about a third of which were nonsacred. He and his stepchildren performed as the Jenkins Family, a group considered to be the first family act to record country music, while Jenkins himself was among the most important country composers of the 1920s.

== Early life ==
Jenkins was born in 1885 in Jenkinsburg, Georgia, on the edge of Atlanta. He was left partially blind by a misprescribed medication while still an infant. Early on, he exhibited remarkable musical talents and was able to play almost any instrument he picked up, learning completely by ear. Jenkins, who also showed a proficiency for writing songs at a young age, saw his musical abilities as "a God gift."

Because he had some vision, Jenkins could not attend the state's school for the blind and had to pursue an education on his own. Besides his musical talents, he was skilled in other ways. After becoming a Methodist at the age of nine, he began "preaching" to playmates from porches and tree stumps. Not surprisingly, he became a licensed preacher around the age of 21 and moved into the city, supplementing whatever he could earn from preaching and street performing and also by running a newspaper stand. After his first wife's death, Jenkins married Francis Jane Walden Eskew in 1919. A young widow, his new wife had three musically talented children, Irene, Mary Lee and a son, T.P. Thus was born the Jenkins Family, one of the most popular family acts of its day.

== The Jenkins Family ==
Little is known about the Jenkins' musical development over their first three years together, but in 1922, they performed their first program on Atlanta radio station WSB with Andrew Jenkins billed as "the blind newsboy evangelist." The station, which had begun broadcasting just five months before and had a signal that reached coast-to-coast, became known as The Voice of the South. Performing folk, country and light classical material, the Jenkins Family was an immediate success and remained with the station for nearly a decade. Their popularity, which reached to Canada and Mexico, also attracted the attention of a major record label, Okeh Records, which issued the group's debut recordings in 1924 (three years before the Carter Family began recording).

The Jenkins Family's initial releases were not originals, but were successful enough to earn the group another session, where they recorded four of Rev. Jenkins's songs, including two gospel numbers. Jenkins was soon asked to write songs for the label's other artists, and his first effort, "The Death of Floyd Collins", took just 45 minutes to complete. While the song sold poorly for Okeh, it was picked up by Columbia Records, which hired Vernon Dalhart, one of the era's leading singers, to record it. The Dalhart version eventually sold more than 300,000 copies. Besides being one of the all-time best-selling country music 78s, the song set a sales record for Columbia that stood for many years.

"The Death of Floyd Collins" was based on one of the first great media events of the century, the story of a spelunker who became trapped in caverns near Mammoth Cave in Kentucky. The song was one of a series of "event" songs recorded in the mid-20s. The songs told of train wrecks, natural disasters and outlaws, stories often lifted directly from the daily newspapers. The form was not new, and in fact, the music and lyrics owed much to the folk songs of the previous century. The trend did not develop as a natural revival, either. It was devised by the recording companies in response to the drop in sales they were experiencing as the public turned its attention from what had been the latest technological development, records, to an even more alluring medium, radio.

== Prolific songwriter ==
Jenkins proved a master at crafting topical songs from traditional musical and lyrical forms. For example, "Floyd Collins" opened with two lines that came directly from an old British ballad:

Oh, come all you young people
and listen while I tell
The fate of Floyd Collins,
a lad we all know well

Jenkins was adept at more than just ballads, turning out one song after another, as his stepdaughter Irene described it, like a mill grinding wheat. Many of his topical compositions were recorded by other artists over the ensuing years, including "Billy the Kid", drawn from a popular 1926 biography of the cowboy killer; "The Wreck of the Royal Palm", about a two-train collision in Georgia in 1926; "The Tragedy on Daytona Beach", based on the 1929 death of race car driver Lee Bible in Florida; "The Fate of Frank Dupre", the story of an Atlanta robbery/murder; and "Ben Dewberry's Final Run", which recounted the death of an Atlantan who was the engineer in a 1908 train wreck. In all, he wrote more than 300 non-sacred songs, many of them "news ballads".

Although the genre's popularity lasted just one brief year, country artists returned to the form again and again – in the late 1920s, pioneers such as Jimmie Rodgers and the Carter Family and in the 1930s, early folk artists such as Woody Guthrie and Lead Belly. The genre was revisited during the folk revival of the 1950s and 1960s, in particular, by Bob Dylan, who wrote one of his first songs based on the same "formula" used by Jenkins, and Phil Ochs, many of whose songs came directly from newspaper headlines.

Meanwhile, Jenkins earned very little from the songs he wrote. The hit "The Death of Floyd Collins", for example, brought him just $25, and under his agreement with the producer he was working with at Okeh, he also gave up all rights to the song. After experiencing copyright problems, Jenkins began keeping meticulous records of his songs. The practice eventually paid off. Years later, after Mahalia Jackson recorded one of his gospel songs, "God Put a Rainbow in the Sky", his stepdaughter Irene was able to prove the song was not in the public domain but was Jenkins's composition.

== Last recordings and later years ==
Rev. Jenkins and the Jenkins Family continued to record with Okeh into the mid-1930s under a variety of names, including the Jenkins Sacred Singers, Irene Spain Family, Gooby Jenkins, Andrew Jenkins & Carson Robison and Jenkins & (Byron) Whitworth. Jenkins cut his last record as an accompanied soloist billed as Blind Andy, a name he often recorded under, on April 23, 1930, while the Jenkins Family's last recording session for Okeh was July 30, 1934.

The Jenkins Family's popularity opened Rev. Jenkins's ministry to a wide audience, as they performed at concerts and organized revival meetings throughout Georgia. Over time, Jenkins also served as pastor of several churches. In 1939, he lost his eyesight completely, yet continued to preach until the time of his death and also broadcast as an evangelist on Mexico's powerful, uncontrolled radio stations.

Jenkins was killed in an automobile accident in Thomaston, Georgia, in 1957.
