= Arts festival =

Festival that features the arts in a wide sense of the word

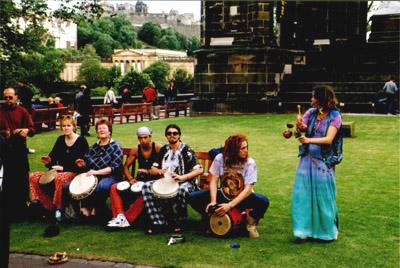
Edinburgh Fringe, Scotland, a notable arts festival

An arts festival is a festival that can encompass a wide range of art forms including music, dance, film, fine art, literature, poetry and is not solely focused on visual arts. Arts festivals may feature a mixed program that include music, literature, comedy, children's entertainment, science, or street theatre, and are typically presented in venues over a period of time ranging from as short as a day or a weekend to a month. Each event within the program is usually separate.

Arts festivals are largely curated by an artistic director who handles the organizations' artistic direction and can encompass different genres, including fringe theater festivals that are open access, making arts festivals distinctive from greenfield festivals, which typically are weekend camping festivals such as Glastonbury, and Visual Arts Festivals, which concentrate on the visual arts.

Another type of arts festivals are music festivals, which are outdoor musical events usually spanning a weekend, featuring a number of bands and musical genres including pop, rock, heavy-metal, and more. Since the 1960s, world-music festivals have become popular in a variety of countries. The most well-recognized music festival was Woodstock, which took place in 1969 in Bethel, New York. It was attended by 400,000 people and featured performances by The Who, Jimi Hendrix, Janis Joplin, and the Grateful Dead.

== History ==
Probably the two oldest arts festivals are located in England. The Three Choirs Festival in the West of England was established as a "yearly musical assembly" by 1719. The other is the Norfolk and Norwich Festival which first took place in 1772. The largest arts festival in England today is the Brighton Festival Fringe.

Leading arts festivals include the Edinburgh Festival in Edinburgh, Adelaide Festival of Arts in Adelaide, the Biennale of Sydney, Festival d'Avignon in Avignon, France, and Tongyeong International Music Festival in Tongyeong, Korea and Sanskruti Arts Festival, Upvan, India. One-off arts festivals have included the Liverpool08 European Capital of Culture in 2008.

In the summer of 1793, revolutionary France was invaded by foreign armies which resulted in the destruction of all signs of royalty. During this time, French citizens sang, danced, and theaters as well as indoor music multiplied. By 1793, two dozen new venues for music and drama had been established, as a result of the end of restrictive monopolies that previously ruled. Art dealings were rapidly increasing and as a flood of paintings were for sale, this reduced artists to near impoverishment. Therefore, as a result, this called for an attempt to replace the old system of the arts with a new one. This gave rise to festivals that were used not only as an artistic outlet, but also for political protest against the old government system. These festivals often included religious symbolism, political messages and embodied the spirit of liberty, equality and fraternity. In 1792, The "Festival of Liberty" included a Declaration of the rights of man, busts of Voltaire, Rousseau, and Franklin, a hymn to liberty, women in white carrying chains, and a large chariot with a seated statue of liberty

== Types of arts festivals ==
=== Arts festival ===
An Arts Festival is an umbrella term for a festival that focuses on multiple art genres including fine art (painting, drawing, pottery), music, photography, film, and other visual styles. Fringe festivals are a type of arts festival, often focusing on many arts but sometimes focusing on a specific art such as theater more than others. Some subgenres of an arts festival include art fairs, theater festivals, dance festivals, film festivals, music festivals (pop festivals) and more.

=== Art fair ===
An art fair is a subgenre of arts festival that focuses on visual art specifically, or specific fields of visual art such as new media art festivals. Other subgenres of art festivals are termed photography festivals or street art festivals, for example. Typically, an art fair has a wide range of artists, art dealers, collectors, and curators who buy or sell artwork in a venue, or gallery, that is open to the public. Some items for sale include photography, paintings, drawings, metalwork, handcrafted items and pottery.

Festivals of visual arts are also not to be confused with commercial art fairs. Artists participate in the most important of such festival exhibitions by invitation, and these exhibitions (e.g. the Venice Biennale) are organised by internationally recognized curators chosen by a committee of peers. Conversely art fairs are market-oriented shows where art dealers exhibit and sell the work of the artists they represent.

=== Theater festival ===
The first drama festival was in 543BC, at the Athenian Great Dionysia. At the drama festivals, playwrights and poets competed to have their plays performed, and the actors competed to win the title for best performance. The performances were given in semi-circular auditorium cut into hillsides and capable of seating 10,000–20,000 people. The stage consisted of a dancing floor, an orchestra, dressing room and scene-building area, known as a skene. The actors were typically men who wore masks appropriate to the characters they represented, and each might play several parts.

=== Film festival ===
Film festivals are organized events, usually staged by universities, private organizations, local governments, or arts associations, that show films in cinemas or screening venues and provide filmmakers a chance to get notable recognition among fellow film enthusiasts. Films can include international and domestic releases and can even be on a specific film-maker, genre or subject matter. Film festivals are typically annual events and can feature full-length or short films.

One of the most notable Film Festivals is the Sundance Film Festival, which originated from Salt Lake City in 1984 as part of the Sundance Institute organization and was founded by Robert Redford. To this date, it is one of the largest independent cinema festivals in the United States.

=== Poetry festival ===
Poetry festivals are organized events staged by poetry and literature groups, local arts associations, private organizations and others that showcase contemporary poetry and provide a chance for poets to meet each other, celebrate poetry, critique each other's work and debate poetic issues. Poets can include international, national and local writers, and can include a specific theme. They are often held in a particular location over set dates. In contrast to literary festivals, poetry festivals put poetry centre stage. Poetry Festivals are typically annual events. Festivals established for more than 10 years in the UK include the festivals at Aldeburgh, Ledbury and Torbay, and the Stanza Poetry festival in Scotland. In India, a number of popular poetry festivals and in Northeast India, Guwahati Grand Poetry festival and Assam Arts Biennale, which began in 2018, are the first of its kind in the region.

== See also ==
- European Festivals Association
