= White Triplex =

American land speed record car

Overview
- Also called: Spirit of Elkdom
- Production: one-off (1928)

Body and chassis
- Body style: minimal-bodywork racing car.

Powertrain
- Engine: Three Liberty L-12 V12 aero engines

The White Triplex (also known as the "Triplex Special" and the "Spirit of Elkdom") was an American land speed record car built for J. H. White and driven by Ray Keech. It was powered by three 27-litre Liberty aero engines, for a total of 36 cylinders, 81 litres of displacement and a claimed 1500 bhp.

White, a wealthy American from Philadelphia (no connection to the White Motor Company), wanted to take the land speed record from the British, then shared in a duel between Henry Segrave and Malcolm Campbell.

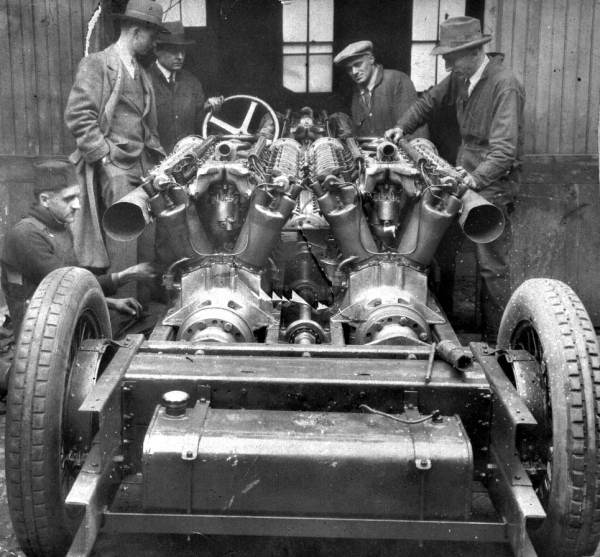
Showing the three engines

No suitable engines were available to give a sufficient advantage over the British Napier Lion, so the simplest possible chassis was constructed and three war-surplus Liberty aero engines were squeezed into it. The vehicle was simple, with no clutch or gearbox and only a single fixed ratio. Once running by a push start, it had to keep rolling. Driver comforts were minimal: the forward engine was sheathed in a crude attempt at streamlining, the two side-by-side behind it were bare, with the driver perched between them and the one in front.

== Keech's record attempt ==
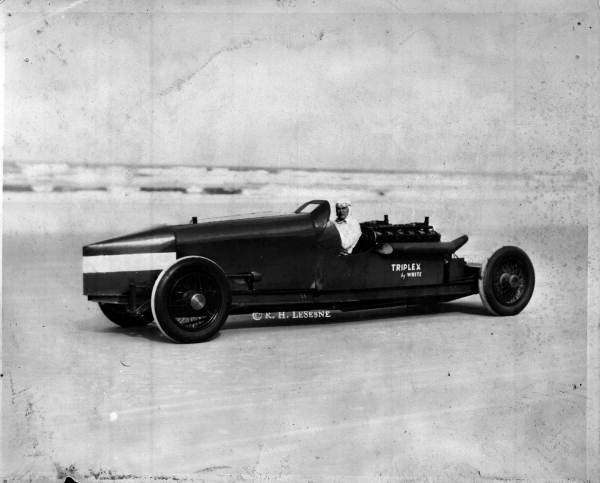
Triplex in 1928, driven by Ray Keech

An established motor-racing driver, Ray Keech, was engaged to drive. Initial trial runs were hazardous, with Keech being injured by burns during both: first from a burst radiator hose, then by exhaust flames from the front engine.

The simplicity of the design also led to a farcical situation with the official scrutineers. The regulations required "means for reversing", which the White Triplex did not have. Mechanics first jury-rigged an electric motor and roller drive onto a tire, but this was unable to rotate against the compression of the three large engines, which could not be uncoupled from the drive wheels. An even more complicated contrivance was tried, an entire separate rear axle was fitted, held above ground until dropped by a release lever and then driven by a separate driveshaft. The device is not believed to have been fitted during the record attempt itself, but it satisfied the scrutineers.

On April 22, 1928, Keech set a new land speed record of 207.55 mph (334.02 km/h) at Daytona.

== Death of Lee Bible ==
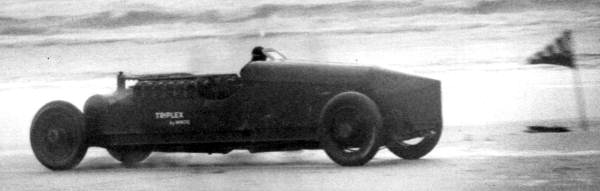
The Triplex Special in 1929, driven by Lee Bible

This record was raised to over 230 mph by Henry Segrave in Golden Arrow on March 11, 1929. Keech was asked by White to drive again, this time at Ormond Beach, and to re-break the record in the Triplex. Keech declined, considering the car to be too dangerous. White then hired their team mechanic Lee Bible, a garage owner with no experience driving at these speeds.

On his first two runs, Bible was timed at first 186 mph (299 km/h) and then 202 mph (325 km/h), both below the Triplex Special's previous best and well short of Golden Arrow's standing record. At the end of this second pass, the Triplex ran off the track and into the sand dunes, causing it to roll over and finally come to a stop 200 ft (60 m) further on. Bible was thrown from the car, killing him instantly. A Pathé newsreel cinema photographer and spectator, Charles Traub, was also killed. Some blame Bible's driving and excessively fast deceleration, others the Triplex's lack of stability. There is controversy about both of those deaths, as it is also unclear whether the photographer was in an area expected to be safe, or if he approached the running line too closely in order to get more dramatic footage.
