= Short Type 320 =

British two-seat seaplane

Type 320
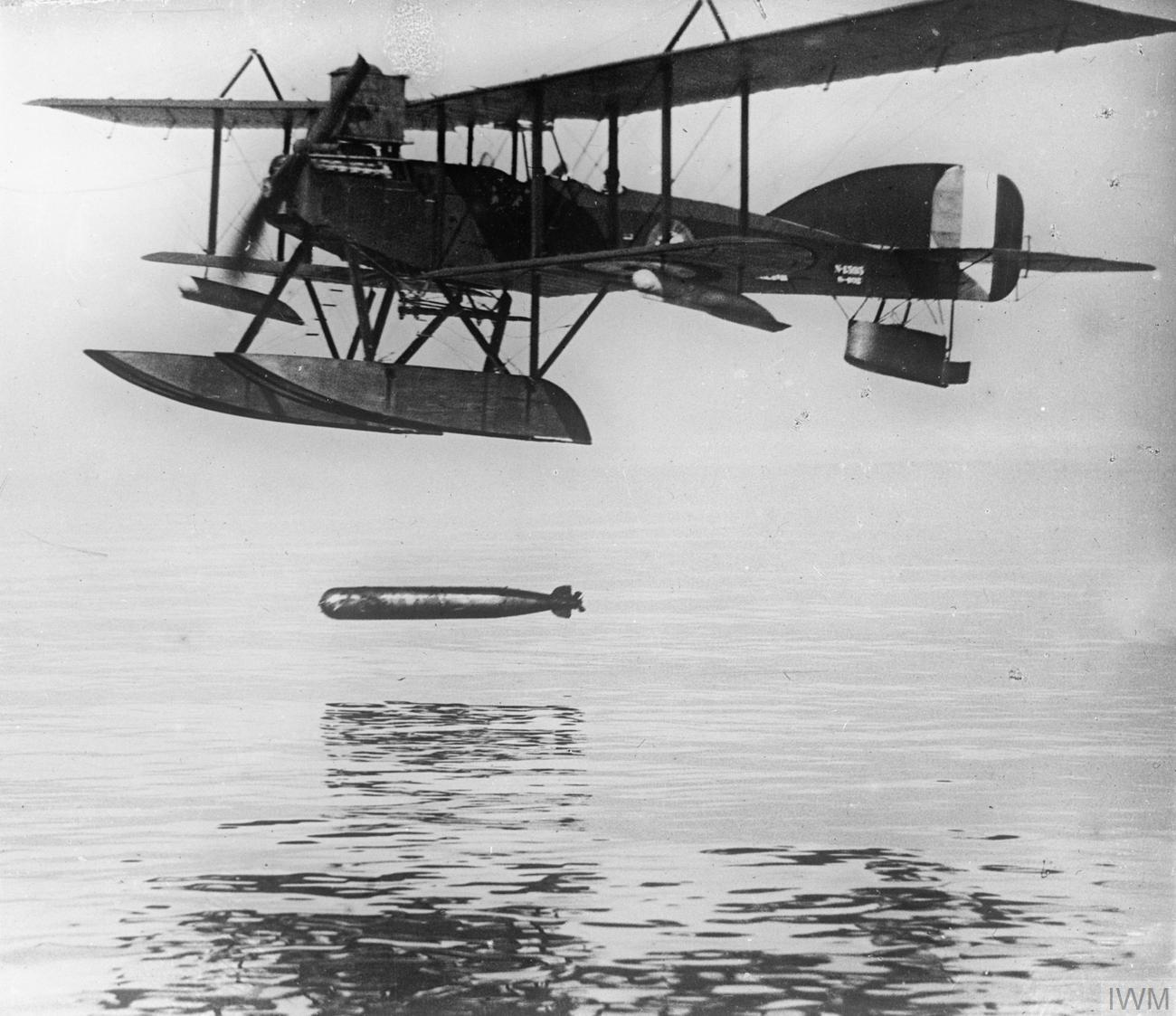

General information
- Type: Torpedo-bomber and reconnaissance floatplane
- National origin: United Kingdom
- Manufacturer: Short Brothers, Sunbeam Motor Car Company
- Primary user: Royal Naval Air Service; Royal Air Force
- Number built: 127

History
- Introduction date: 1917
- First flight: 1916

The Short Type 320, also known as the Short Admiralty Type 320, was a British two-seat reconnaissance, bombing and torpedo-carrying "folder" seaplane of the First World War.

== Design and development ==
The Short Type 320 was designed to meet an official requirement for a seaplane to carry a Mark IX torpedo. It was larger than the earlier Short 184, and was a typical Short folder design of the time, with two-bay uneven span wings. Two prototypes were built, powered by a 310 hp Sunbeam Cossack engine, and initially known as the Short 310 Type A from the engine fitted to the prototypes. When the torpedo bomber went into production, it was powered by a 320 hp (238 kW) Cossack engine which was the origin of the name, Type 320.

At the same time as Shorts was designing the 310 Type A torpedo bomber, it produced a similar design for a patrol floatplane, powered by the same Cossack engine and using the same fuselage, but with equal-span three-bay wings, instead of the uneven- span wings of the torpedo bomber, known as the Short 310 Type B or North Sea Scout, and two prototypes were ordered.

Priority was given to the torpedo bomber; the first was ready in July 1916, the second in August that year, and the prototypes were rushed to the Adriatic. In September 1916, the first prototype patrol aircraft was finished, but it proved to be little better than the Short 184 already in service, and was not ordered into production. The second prototype, Type B, was completed as a type A torpedo bomber.

As with conventional biplane floatplanes, the torpedo was carried between the bottom of the fuselage and the floats. Unusually, the aircraft was flown from the rear cockpit, although this did cause a problem for an observer in the front seat. The observer had to stand on the coaming to use the machine-gun, which was level with the top wing. When a torpedo was carried, the aircraft could not fly with an observer at the same time.

The first order placed with Shorts was for 30 aircraft, followed by orders for a further 24 and 20 aircraft, together with orders for a further 30 and 20 placed at Sunbeam. Together with the three prototypes, this gave a total production of 127 Short Type 320s.

== Operational history ==
In February 1917, 25 aircraft were ordered, and before the end of April 1917, examples were delivered to the Royal Naval Air Service in Italy. Two accidents with the aircraft, when the fuselage collapsed after the torpedo was released, delayed its use on operations. The cause was later found to be the method of securing the fuselage bracing wires.

The first operational use was on 2 September 1917, when six aircraft (five with torpedoes and one with bombs) were towed on rafts fifty miles south of Traste Bay to enable them to attack enemy submarines lying off Cattaro. They had to be towed into position as they could not carry enough fuel with a torpedo for the mission. The operation did not go well; with a gale-force wind and heavy seas, two of the aircraft failed to take off, so the operation was abandoned. On the return journey, one aircraft was lost and the others were damaged. It appears that the Type 320 never launched a torpedo in action.

In February 1918, due to the lack of operational experience, four aircraft were operated from Calshot for experiments with launching the torpedoes. Forty drops were made, and proved a valuable source of information about torpedoes entering the water when dropped at different heights and speeds. The aircraft continued to be used as reconnaissance seaplanes until the end of the war.

== Operators ==
Japan

- Imperial Japanese Navy, one only

United Kingdom

- Royal Air Force
  - No. 229 Squadron RAF
  - No. 240 Squadron RAF
  - No. 248 Squadron RAF
  - No. 263 Squadron RAF
  - No. 266 Squadron RAF
  - No. 268 Squadron RAF
- Royal Naval Air Service
  - No. 6 Wing - Italy

== Specifications ==
Data from The Short Seaplanes

General characteristics

- Length: 45 ft 9 in (13.94 m)
- Upper wingspan: 75 ft 0 in (22.86 m)
- Lower wingspan: 46 ft 9 1/2 in (14.262 m)
- Height: 17 ft 6 in (5.33 m)
- Wing area: 810 sq ft (75 m^{2})
- Empty weight: 4,933 lb (2,238 kg)
- Gross weight: 7,014 lb (3,181 kg)
- Powerplant: 1 × Sunbeam Cossack water-cooled V12 engine, 320 hp (240 kW)

Performance

- Maximum speed: 72.5 mph (116.7 km/h, 63.0 kn)
- Endurance: 6 hr
- Service ceiling: 3,000 ft (910 m)

Armament

- Guns: 1× .303 in (7.7mm) Lewis gun on Scarff ring
- Bombs: ** 1 × 18-inch torpedo or
  - 2 × 230 lb (100 kg) bombs

== See also ==
Related lists

- List of aircraft of the Royal Air Force
- List of aircraft of the Royal Naval Air Service
- List of flying boats and floatplanes
