= AD Seaplane Type 1000 =

British seaplane of the First World War

- The aircraft after being launched from Cowes

General information
- Type: Torpedo bomber bomber
- Manufacturer: J. Samuel White
- Designer: Harris Booth
- Primary user: Royal Naval Air Service
- Number built: 2

History
- First flight: 1916

The AD Seaplane Type 1000 also known as the Admiralty Type 1000 and the AD.1 (from Air Department) was a British seaplane of the First World War designed to attack German warships. When it first flew, it was the largest British aircraft yet to take to the air.

== Development ==
The design of the AD.1 was by Harris Booth of the Admiralty's Air Department just prior to World War I. It was the world's first aircraft designed from scratch as a torpedo bomber, one of the three planned versions of the design. The other two were a bomber and an aircraft armed with a recoilless Davis 12-pounder gun (approximately 76 mm calibre).

The aircraft was a float-equipped biplane of pod-and-boom design, with engines mounted at the front of both booms, as well as at the rear of the crew pod. Development began in 1915; it was completed and flown for the first time during the summer of 1916. It was found that the Davis gun would project a blast rearwards so the weapon was changed for a conventional 12-pounder 'Naval Landing Gun' though in practice a gun was never installed in the AD.1.

== Service ==
Seven aircraft were ordered from J. Samuel White, but when the first one delivered was tested, it was found that its weight was higher than expected, its performance was unexpectedly poor and its undercarriage was not robust enough: based on these findings, the contract for the remaining six aircraft was cancelled. The sole example is known to have survived until 1916, probably at the Royal Naval Air Service's Seaplane Experimental Station, Felixstowe base.

== Specifications (AD Seaplane Type 1000) ==
Data from British Aeroplanes 1914-1918

General characteristics

- Crew: 5
- Length: 64 ft 3 in (19.58 m)
- Wingspan: 115 ft 0 in (35.05 m)
- Empty weight: 22,352 lb (10,139 kg)
- Gross weight: 27,900 lb (12,655 kg)
- Powerplant: 3 × Sunbeam Cossack V-12 water-cooled piston engines, 310 hp (230 kW) each
- Propellers: 4-bladed fixed-pitch wooden propellers (2 tractor and 1 pusher)

Performance

- Maximum speed: 73 kn (84 mph, 135 km/h)
- Range: 481 nmi (553 mi, 890 km)
- Service ceiling: 4,900 ft (1,500 m)

Armament

- Guns: 1x QF 12-pounder 8 cwt gun
- Bombs: 1x 810 lb (367 kg) torpedo
