= Blackburn Segrave =

1930s British touring aircraft

B.1 Segrave
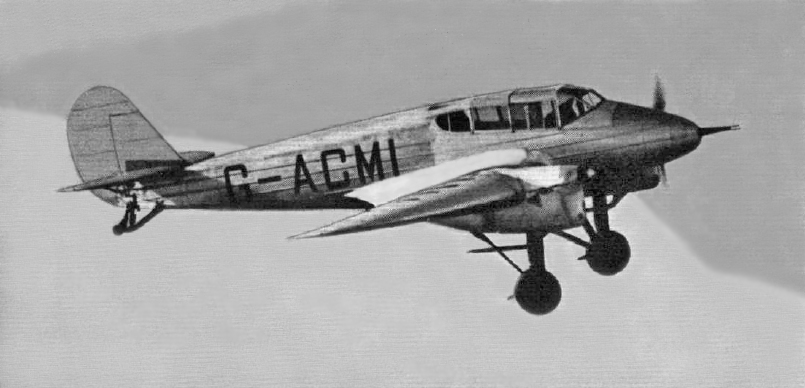
- Segrave II

General information
- Type: Touring Monoplane
- Manufacturer: Blackburn Aircraft
- Designer: Sir Henry Segrave
- Status: Retired
- Number built: 4 + 2 by Piaggio

History
- First flight: 28 May 1930
- Retired: 1938

The Blackburn B-1 Segrave was a 1930s British twin-engine four-seat touring aircraft built by Blackburn Aircraft.

== History ==
The aircraft was designed by the racing driver (and world land speed record holder) Sir Henry Segrave as a twin-engine four-seat touring monoplane. A wooden prototype, designated Saro Segrave Meteor I was built by Saunders Roe at Cowes. The prototype (registered G-AAXP) first flew on 28 May 1930. Development was delayed by the death of the designer on 13 June 1930 in a speedboat accident. The aircraft was demonstrated in Rome to the Italian Air Ministry, and a licence agreement was signed to produce the aircraft as the Piaggio P.12, although only two appear to have been made. With lack of space at Cowes and with the decision to build a metal version, two aircraft were built by Blackburn Aircraft at Brough Aerodrome with the designation Blackburn CA.18 Segrave. Blackburn changed the designation system, and the aircraft became the Blackburn B.1 Segrave.

Despite sales tours around Europe, the aircraft was not ordered, and only one further example was built. This was completed by Blackburn as the Blackburn CA.20 Segrave II to test a new single-spar wing.

== Aircraft ==
Segrave Meteor (registration G-AAXP)
After use as a demonstrator, it was in private use until withdrawn from use at Brough in 1932.

Segrave I (registration G-ABFP)
The first metal version was used by the British Air Navigation Company for cross-Channel charters, then sold for private use; scrapped at Brough in 1934.

Segrave I (registration G-ABFR)
Was used by the North Sea Aerial & General Transport Company until 1935, mainly as a ferry across the River Humber, when it was sold to British Air Transport at Redhill Aerodrome. It was withdrawn from use in 1938.

Segrave II (registration G-ACMI)
First flown 2 February 1934, it was used by Blackburn for trials, until it was dismantled at Brough in 1935. It was later presented to Loughborough College as an instructional airframe.

Piaggio P.12
Licensed version, two built.

== Specifications (Segrave I) ==
Data from Blackburn Aircraft since 1909

General characteristics

- Crew: 1
- Capacity: 3 passengers
- Length: 28 ft 6 in (8.69 m)
- Wingspan: 39 ft 6 in (12.04 m)
- Height: 7 ft 9 in (2.36 m)
- Wing area: 230 sq ft (21 m^{2})
- Empty weight: 2,246 lb (1,019 kg)
- Gross weight: 3,300 lb (1,497 kg)
- Powerplant: 2 × de Havilland Gipsy III 4-cylinder air-cooled in-line piston engines, 120 hp (89 kW) each
- Propellers: 2-bladed fixed-pitch propellers

Performance

- Maximum speed: 138 mph (222 km/h, 120 kn)
- Cruise speed: 112 mph (180 km/h, 97 kn)
- Range: 450 mi (720 km, 390 nmi)
- Service ceiling: 14,000 ft (4,300 m)
- Absolute ceiling: 17,000 ft (5,200 m)
- Rate of climb: 800 ft/min (4 m/s)

== See also ==
Related lists

- List of aircraft (B-Be)
