= Lee Bible =

American garage operator and a racing-car driver

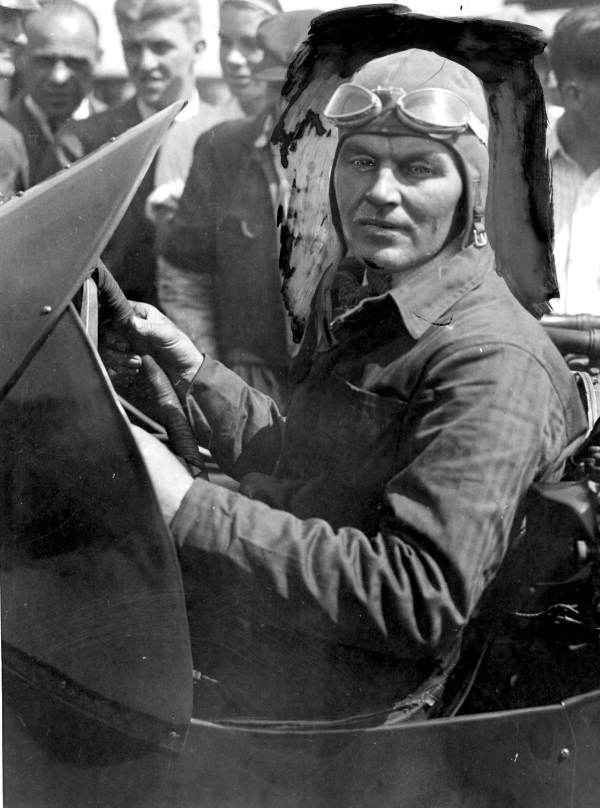
- Born: May 27, 1887 Near Midway, Tennessee, United States
- Died: March 13, 1929 (aged 41) Ormond Beach, Florida, United States

Conway Lee Bible (May 27, 1887 – March 13, 1929) was an American garage operator and a racing-car driver.

Bible was killed attempting to break the land-speed record on March 13, 1929, at Ormond Beach, Florida.

== Early life ==
He was born Conway Lee Bible on a farm near Midway, Tennessee.

== Pre-record attempt ==
On March 11, British driver Major Henry O. D. Segrave had set the land-speed record of 231.44 mph (372.47 km/h) in his Golden Arrow, beating the old record held by Ray Keech, who had set the record in the Triplex Special.

Jim White, owner of the Special, wanted the title to come back to the United States. Keech was asked to come back and drive the Triplex Special, but he declined, considering the car too dangerous.

White then offered the ride to their team mechanic and garage operator, Lee Bible, who saw this as the opportunity of a lifetime. He was declared eligible by officials after a few practice runs, despite his lack of experience.

== The record attempt ==
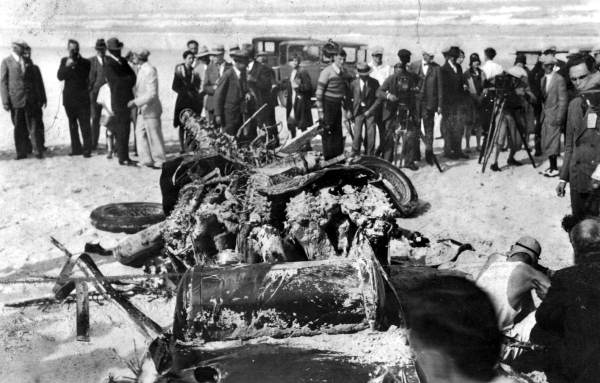
Aftermath of the crash

On his first run, Bible was clocked at 186 mph (299 km/h) – well below the record. On his return run he was clocked at 202 mph (325 km/h). However, shortly after the time trap, the car suddenly swerved, presumably because Bible released the accelerator too fast. The Triplex Special crashed into the dunes and rolled, finally coming to a stop 200 feet (61 m) further. During this crash, Bible was thrown from the car, killing him instantly. The Triplex Special rolled into a newsreel cameraman, Charles R. Traub, who was killed instantly.

== See also ==
- List of people from Tennessee
- List of racing drivers who died in racing crashes
