= Jack Irving =

British automobile engineer

John Samuel Irving (1880–1953), MIAE, was a British automobile engineer best known for designing the Irving-Napier land speed record breaking car Golden Arrow.

== Apprenticeship ==
Born in Manchester in 1880 he joined the Daimler Company in 1903 after serving an apprenticeship in toolmaking and general engineering. He was awarded the London City and Guilds silver medal for motorcar engineering in 1908. He was a lecturer at both Coventry and Warwickshire Technical Institutes. Irving remained with Daimler until 1910.

== Balloons, RAE and RFC ==
From Daimler he joined the Balloon Factory at South Farnborough later known as the Royal Aircraft Establishment with Colonel Mervyn O'Gorman and was made chief of their engine research and development. He was closely involved with experiments in and the development of airship design. From the outbreak of war Irving served with the Royal Flying Corps during the first World War and later chose to be addressed by his rank of captain, Captain Jack Irving.

== Automotive industry ==
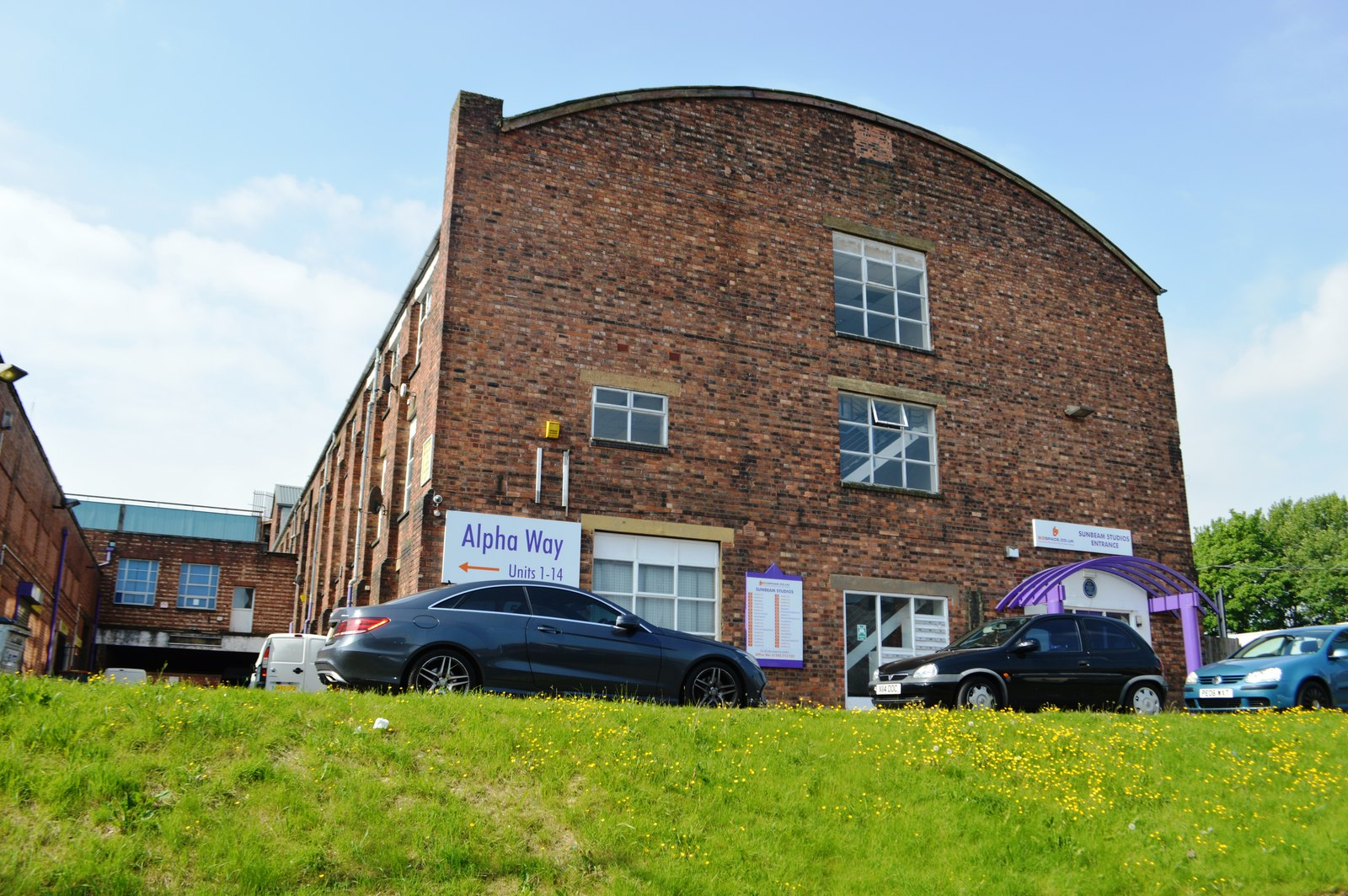
Sunbeam's experimental department where special cars and engines were built

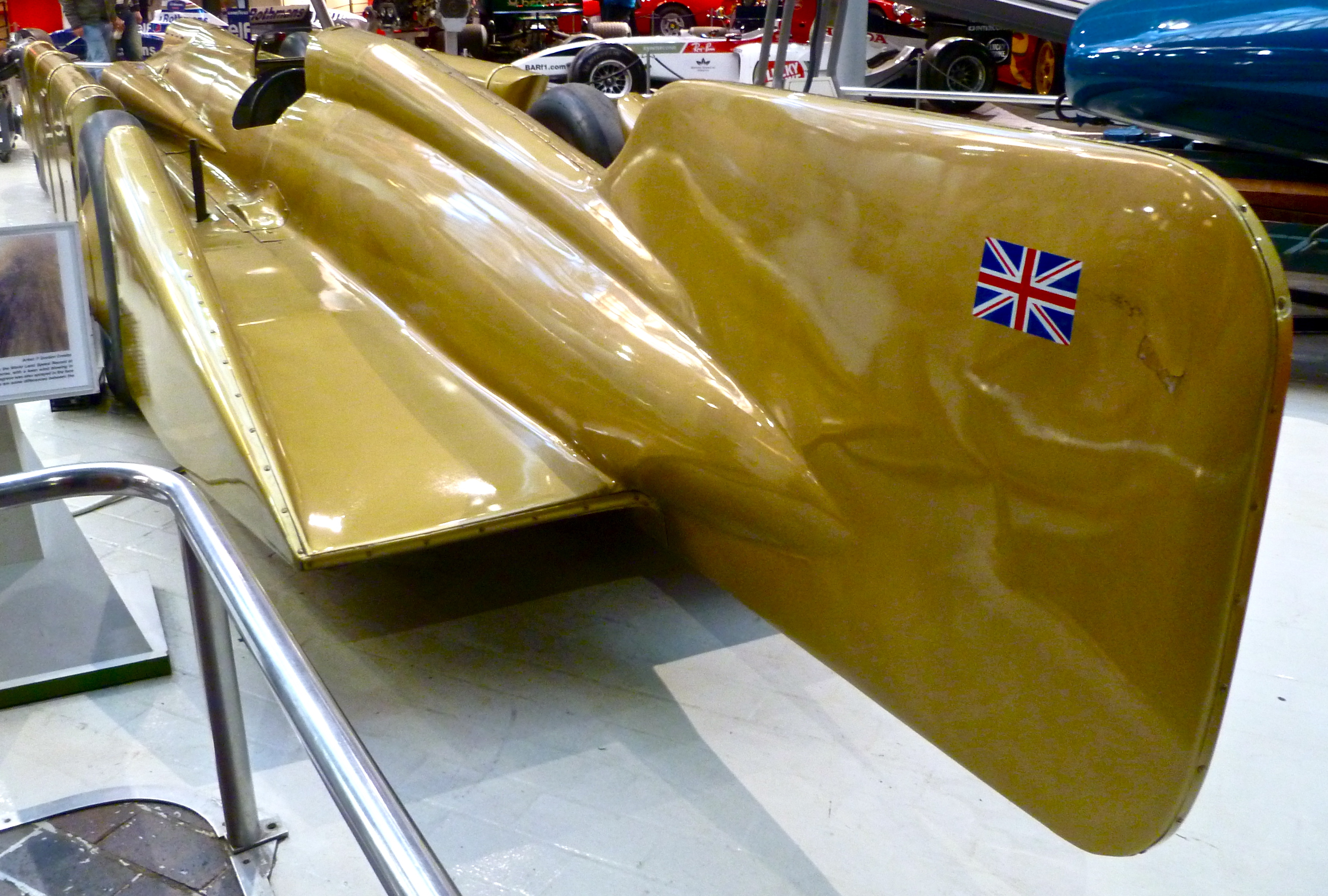
Golden Arrow

=== Sunbeam airships and motor racing ===
After the war Irving joined Sunbeam as Chief Experimental Engineer developing power plants for the airships R33, R34, R36 and R38. He later became Engineer to Sunbeam. He also took responsibility for Sunbeam's car and motor-boat racing. Particular successes were winning the French Grand prix in 1923 and the many Talbot Darracq successes and also the twin-engined 1000 horsepower Sunbeam land speed record-breaker of 1927 under the patronage of Louis Coatalen.

=== Humfrey-Sandberg and the Irving-Napier Golden Arrow ===
From Sunbeam Irving took an appointment with Humfrey-Sandberg Co developing their freewheel and easy gear change device. Humfrey-Sandberg granted him permission to use part of his time designing and constructing Golden Arrow for ex-Sunbeam driver Henry Segrave. A measure of Irving's success was that as well as setting new land speed records Segrave reported the Golden Arrow was very docile compared with other cars of its kind. After the car's first and only test run Segrave drove the car up some planks to get it off the beach then drove it back through the main street of Daytona to its garage. Contemporary reports refer to the car as the Irving-Napier Golden Arrow.

=== Humber ===
Captain Irving was appointed technical director of the combined Humber and Hillman motor manufacturers in the late 1920s. His responsibilities included the design of Hillman's new Minx in which he was assisted by A H Wilde recruited from the Standard Motor Company.

=== Bendix ===
He joined Bendix Limited in 1931.

A member of the Institution of Automobile Engineers since 1908 he was a member of their council from 1931 until his death and served as the institute's president in 1936–1937.

Captain J S Irving died at Acocks Green, Birmingham 28 March 1953. He married in 1904; a son and daughter survived him.
