= Sunbeam 1000 hp =

1000HP Sunbeam
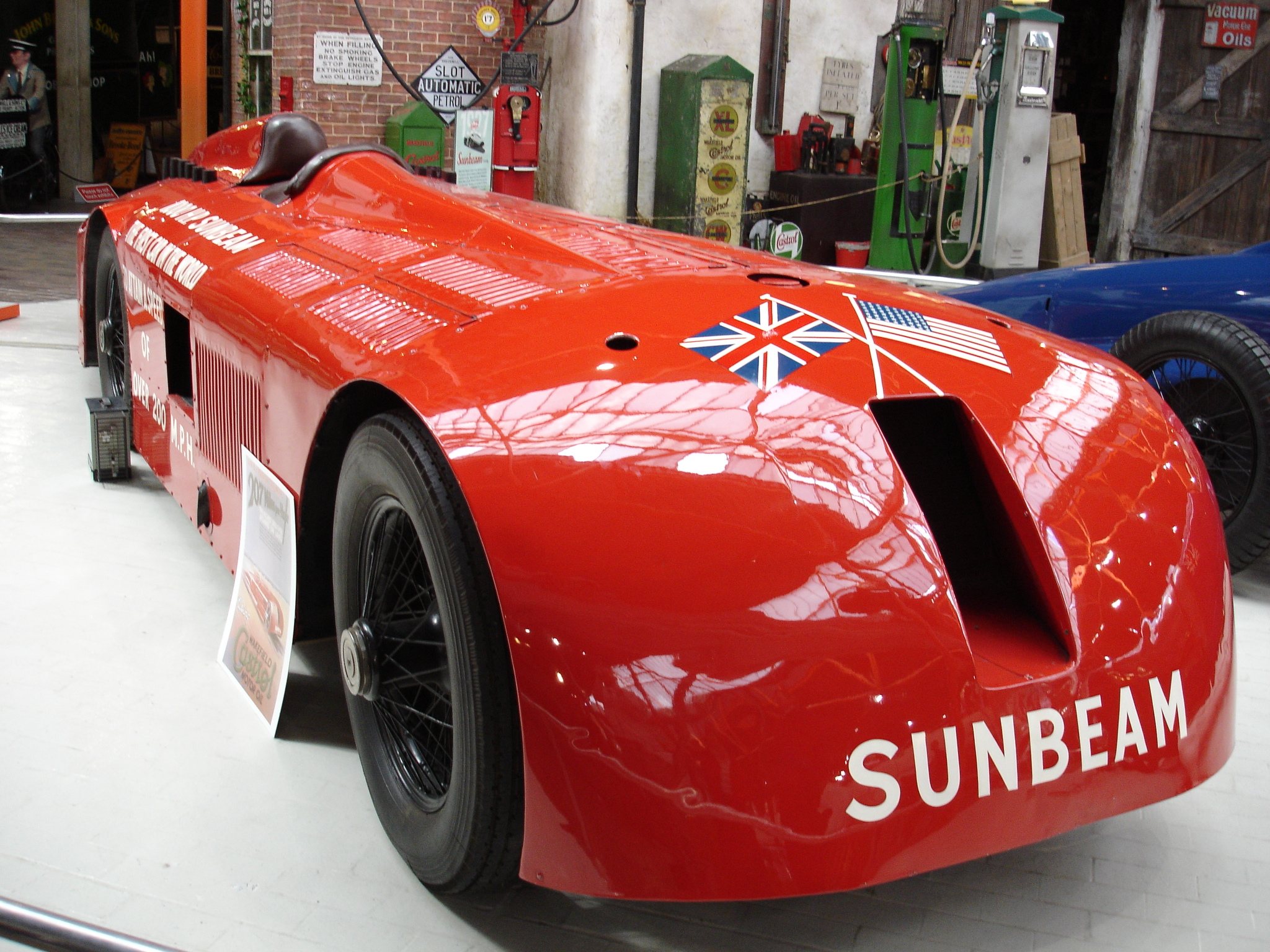

Overview
- Manufacturer: Sunbeam
- Also called: Mystery; The Slug
- Production: one-off (1926)
- Designer: J. S. Irving, with Louis Coatalen

Body and chassis
- Class: land speed record
- Body style: enclosed and streamlined with open cockpit

Powertrain
- Engine: 2 x Sunbeam Matabele 22.4 litre (1,367 cubic inches) V12 engines, approx. 900 hp in total
- Transmission: 3 speed, final drive by twin chains

Dimensions
- Length: 25 ft (7.62 m)
- Width: 8 ft (2.44 m)
- Curb weight: 4 tons

The Sunbeam 1000 HP Mystery, or "The Slug", is a land speed record-breaking car built by the Sunbeam car company of Wolverhampton that was powered by two aircraft engines. It was the first car to travel at over 200 mph. The car's last run was a demonstration circuit at Brooklands, running at slow speed on only one engine. It is today on display at the National Motor Museum, Beaulieu.

== Design ==
Louis Coatalen's Automobiles Talbot-Darracq team was short of funds and so little new development was possible. The engines were a pair of Sunbeam Matabele 22.4 litre aircraft engines, previously used in a powerboat. Although best known as the "1000 HP" car, its actual power was closer to 900 hp (670 kW). One engine was mounted ahead of the driver, one behind. The rear engine was started first by compressed air, then the front engine was started through a mechanical friction clutch. Once synchronised, they were locked together with a dog clutch for the record attempt.

The car was designed by Captain Jack Irving, having new features such as all-enveloping bodywork that assisted aerodynamics. The car also had specially-made tyres capable of withstanding 200 mph, although only rated for 3½ minutes at these speeds. One more primitive feature was the final drive to the rear axle using a pair of chains. Only weeks before the record attempt, it was speculated that J. G. Parry-Thomas had been decapitated when a similar chain in his car Babs had broken at speed. Later investigation of the recovered wreckage suggested instead that the rear right-hand wheel had failed, overturning Babs. Although the Sunbeam's chains were enclosed below an armoured steel housing, these covers had been designed from the beginning, they were not added after Parry-Thomas' accident.

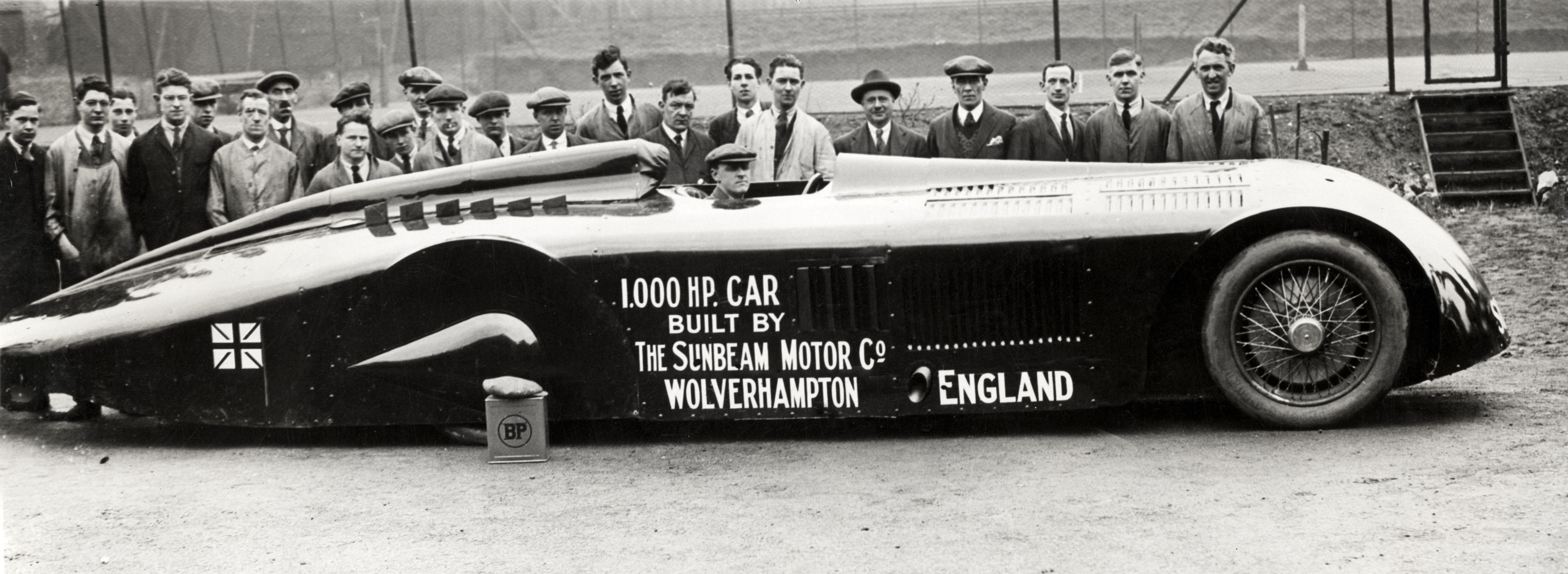
Sunbeam 1000 HP in Wolverhampton, England, 1927

== Record ==
The Sunbeam 1000 HP was the first non-American car to run on Daytona Beach for a land speed record attempt. On 29 March 1927, Henry Segrave drove the car to a new land speed record of 203.79 miles per hour (327.97 km/h), the first car to reach a speed over 200 mph (320 km/h).

== Restoration ==
In June 2026, the National Motor Museum announced the completion of a three-year restoration of Sunbeam 1000 hp. The project involved extensive repairs to the car's two original 22.5-litre Matabele V12 aero engines, with engineers working largely without original manuals or documentation. Following the restoration, both engines were reinstalled and tested, the original bodywork was refitted, and new tyres were fitted. The car is scheduled to be shipped to the United States for display at the Pebble Beach Concours d'Elegance in August 2026 and for a commemorative low-speed run at Daytona Beach on 29 March 2027, marking the centenary of Sir Henry Segrave's 200 mph world land speed record.

== See also ==
- Silver Bullet (car)
