= Pop festivals =

Type of music festival

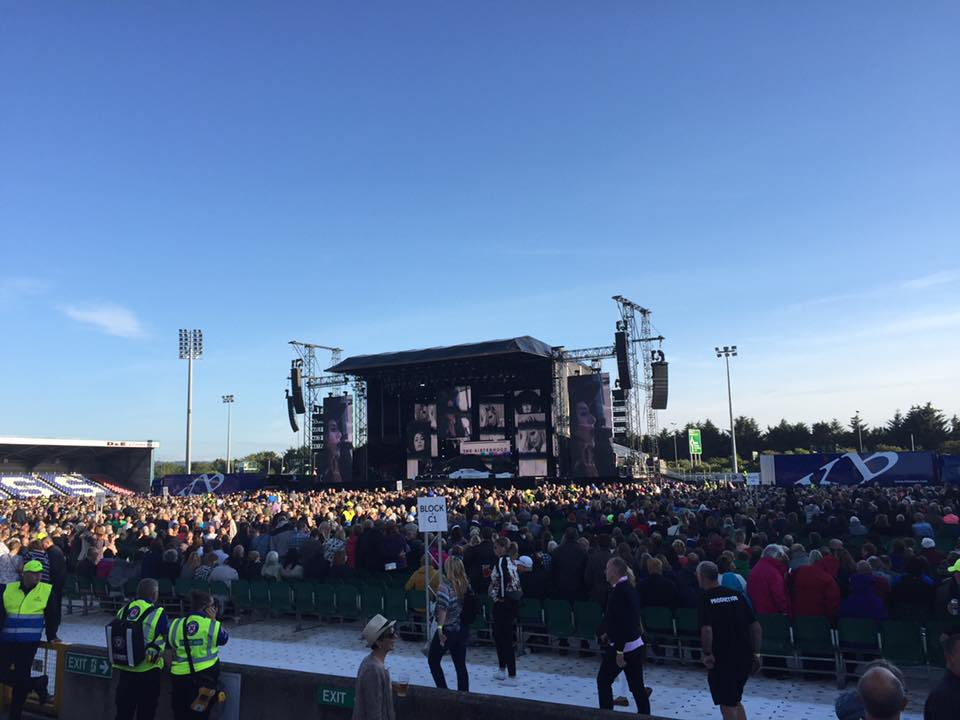
A pop concert at Tulloch Caledonian Stadium

Pop festivals are live music events that center around multiple genres of popular music and feature related artists. Types of music present can include rock, hip-hop, jazz and country.

== History ==
The first known Pop festival occurred during the Pythian Games, held around 600 B.C. They were a precursor to the Olympic Games, and contained a music festival featuring popular music from the time. In 1876, the first Bayreuth Festival was held in Germany. It was started by Richard Wagner and funded by the current German government at the time. The oldest Pop festival still held annually today is the Reading and Leeds Festival, first held in 1961. The festival centered around jazz music, and featured Chris Barber's Jazz Band and Ken Colyer's Jazzmen. In later years it featured artists and bands from other genres, including Eminem, Björk, Nirvana, Kurt Cobain and the White Stripes.

== Notable Pop Festivals ==
=== Coachella ===
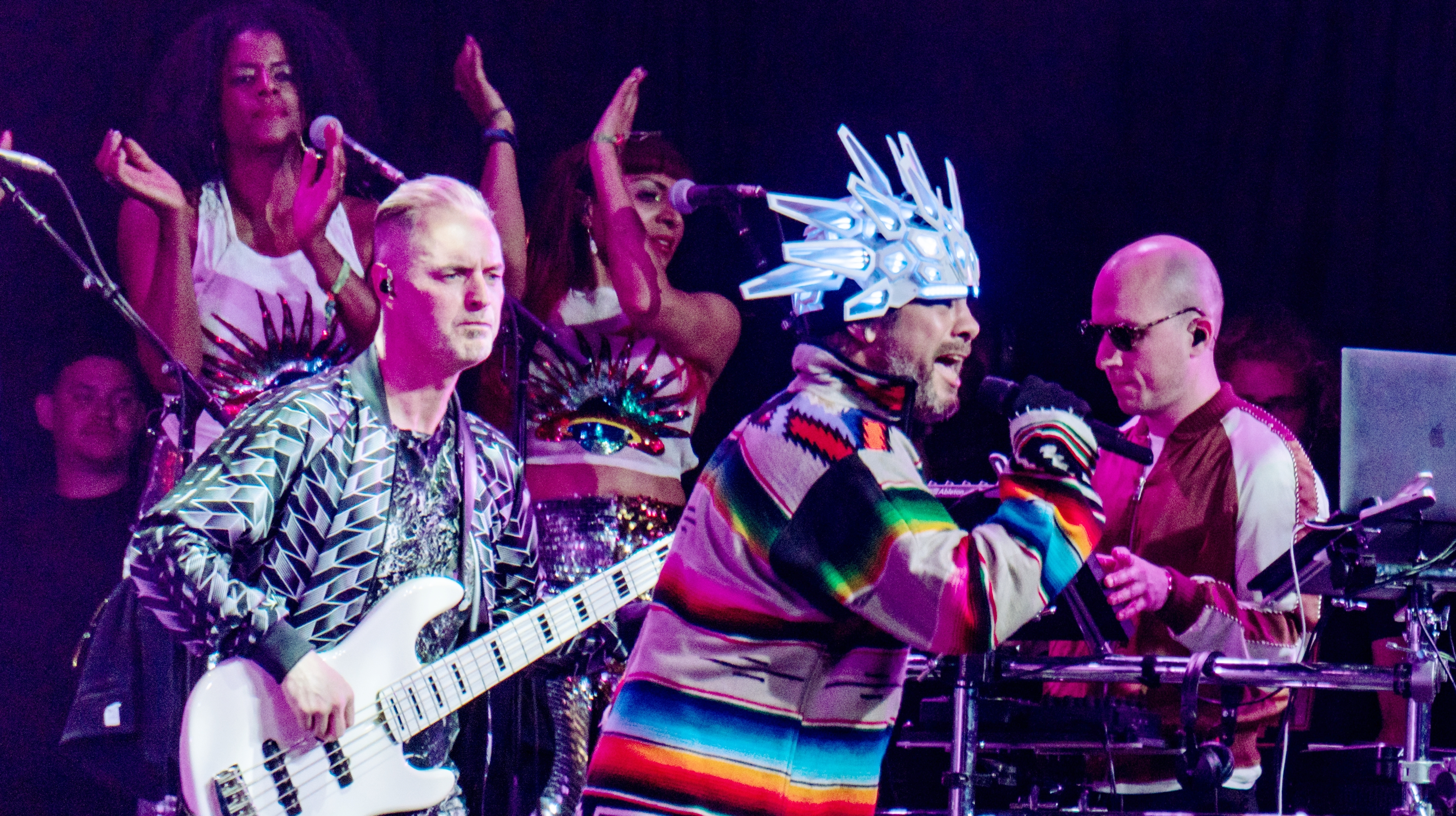
Jamiroquai performing at Coachella in 2018

Coachella is an annual Pop festival held in Indio, California. It began in 1999 as a rock festival, and originally headlined Beck and Rage Against the Machine. It was founded by Paul Tollett and Rick Van Santen and sold 25,000 tickets out of the expected 75,000.

=== Glastonbury Festival ===
The Glastonbury Festival is a Pop festival that began in 1970 in Pilton, England. It was founded by a dairy farmer and originally named the Pilton Pop Folk and Blues Festival, with the first event containing 1,500 attendees. Notable performers throughout the years include David Bowie, the Rolling Stones, Beyoncé and Al Stewart.

=== Monterey Pop Festival ===
The Monterey International Pop Festival was a Pop festival held in 1967. It was organized by Lou Adler and John Phillips. Notable performers included Jimi Hendrix, Janis Joplin and the Mamas & the Papas.
