= Henry Segrave =

British racing driver, land and water speed record holder (1896–1930)

Sir Henry Segrave
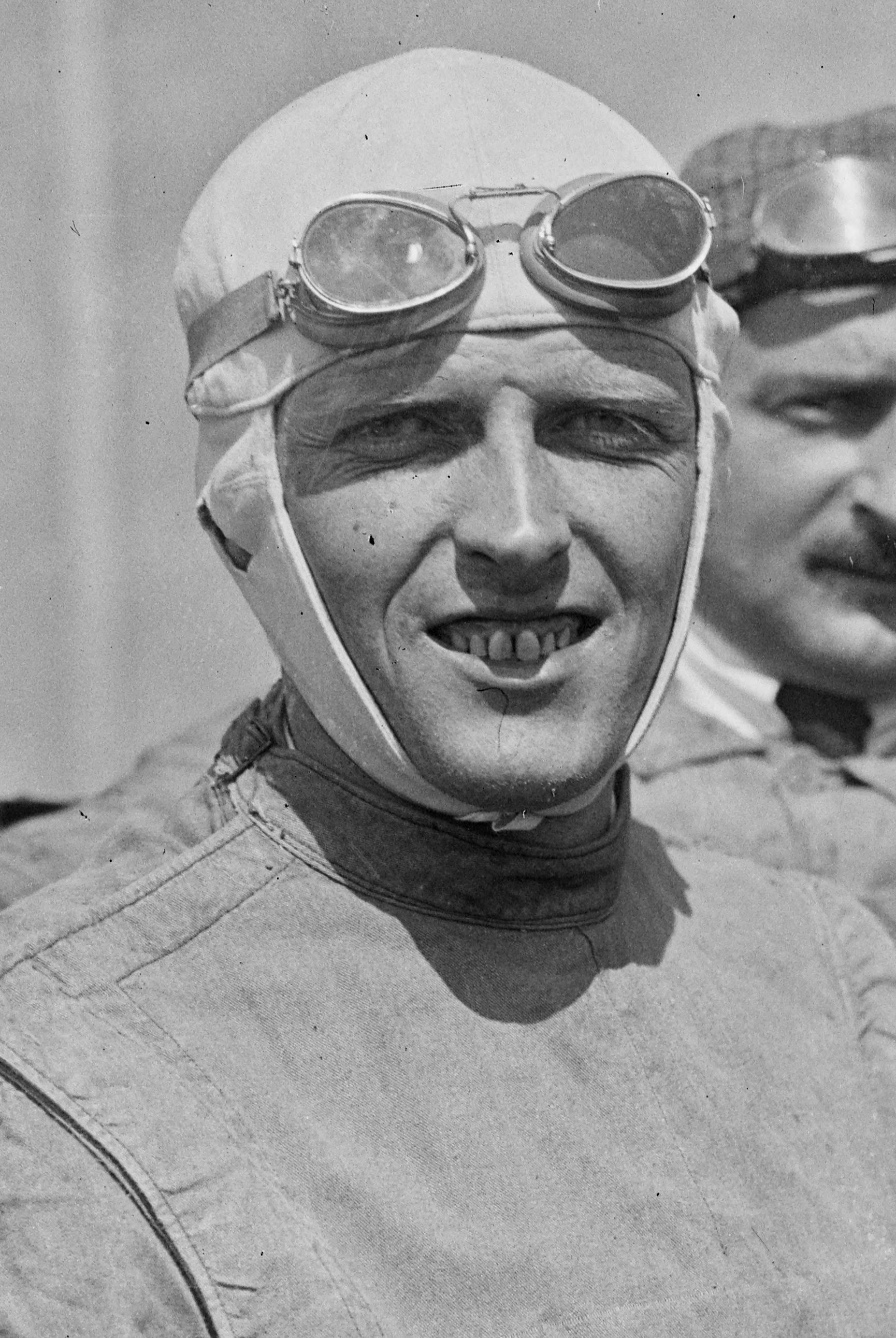
- Segrave at the Grand Prix Sunbeams 1921, 1922 TT
- Born: Henry O'Neal de Hane Segrave; 22 September 1896; Baltimore, Maryland, U.S.
- Died: 13 June 1930 (aged 33); Windermere, Westmorland, England
- Cause of death: crash during water speed record attempt
- Education: Bilton Grange then Eton College
- Occupation: Speed record holder

Sir Henry O'Neal de Hane Segrave (22 September 1896 – 13 June 1930) was an early British pioneer in land speed and water speed records. Segrave, who set three land and one water record, was the first person to hold both titles simultaneously and the first person to travel at over 200 miles per hour (320 km/h) in a land vehicle. He died in an accident in 1930 shortly after setting a new world water speed record on Windermere in the Lake District, England. The Segrave Trophy was established to commemorate his life.

== Early life ==
Segrave, who was a British national, was born on 22 September 1896 in Baltimore, Maryland, to an American mother and an Irish father. He was raised in Ireland and attended Eton College in England. He spent some time at 'Belle Isle' house, near Portumna and learnt to drive the family houseboat. He is reported to have attended the North Shannon Yacht Club regatta on Lough Boderg between Leitrim and Roscommon.

== First World War ==
At the outbreak of war the Sandhurst officer training course was drastically reduced from two years to three months and he was commissioned in November 1914. Anxious to immediately enter the fray, he applied to join a unit that had suffered heavy casualties and so joined the Royal Warwickshire Regiment. Always in the thick of the fighting, his soldiers referred to the 18-year-old subaltern as 'The Lion's Cub'. Wounded in the wrist at Aubers he was again wounded in hand-to-hand fighting on 16 May 1915. His revolver was clogged with mud so he threw a belt of ammunition at the German he was fighting and the resulting shot went high and hit him in the shoulder. Whilst recuperating in England, he transferred to the Royal Flying Corps joining 29 Squadron flying the DH2 fighter. On the first of May 1916 he shot down a German Aviatik two-seater but was hit by anti-aircraft fire over the Somme in early July and crashed, severely breaking an ankle. This effectively ended his combat flying. He described himself as "the world’s worst pilot". and said "I was a rotten pilot, I always seemed to make a mess of landing."

Segrave became the ‘pilot’ in command on the ground of the first unmanned powered aircraft, the Aerial Target. "This was the first drone to fly under control when it was tested in March 1917." He married actress Doris Stocker on 4 October 1917.

On 31 January 1918, Sir Henry Norman, the Munitions Inventions Department's permanent attaché to the French Ministry of Inventions, requested Segrave be assigned to assist him. Segrave was sent to the US in the autumn as part of Brigadier-General Charles Frederick Lee's Headquarter's Staff on the British Aviation Mission. He sent reports to Norman, including details of the US enquiries into their aircraft production failures. After the war, he transferred to the Royal Air Force Administrative Branch in 1919 but soon resigned his commission due to his war injuries.

== Motor sports ==
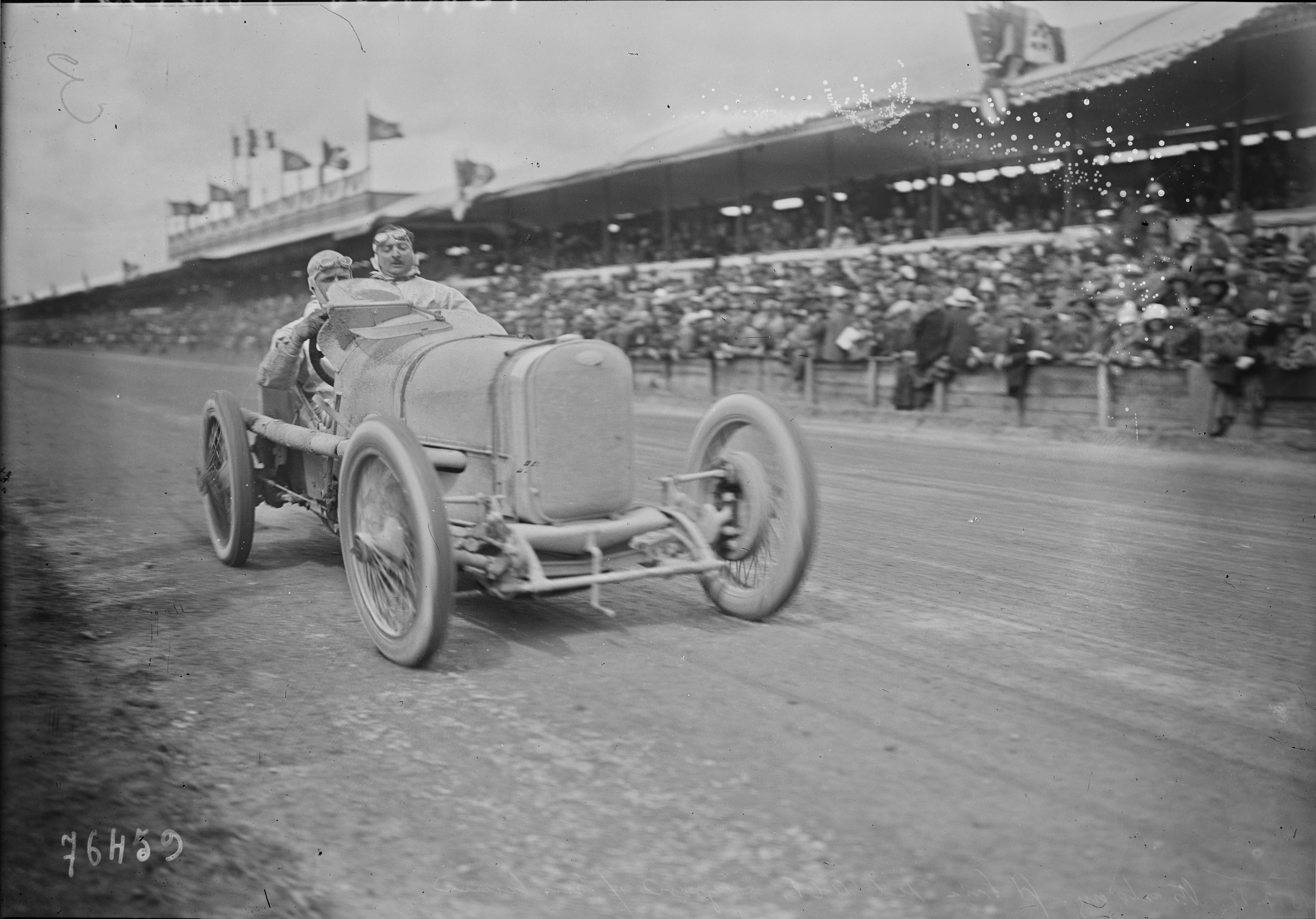
Segrave at the 1922 French Grand Prix held in Strasbourg.

After the war, with motor racing in its infancy, British motor manufacturers were starting to build more reliable and faster vehicles. Segrave would soon become a championship winning driver.

In 1921 Segrave won the first long-distance car race to be run in Britain. The 200-mile race, which was organised by the Junior Car Club for 1,500 c.c. light cars, was held at Brooklands in Surrey. Segrave won in a Darracq-made Talbot that were marketed as Talbot-Darracqs. In the same year Segrave competed in his first ever French Grand Prix, Darracq was reorganised as part of the S.T.D. Motors conglomerate. To impress Breton automobile designer, Louis Coatalen, in order to gain a place in the formidable Sunbeam-Talbot-Darrac Works team, Segrave, replaced fourteen engine covers on his Talbot, a rebadged highly advanced straight eight dual overhead camshaft (dohc) 1921 Sunbeam Grand Prix. In the 1922 French Grand Prix, Segrave was forced to retire in his Grand Prix Sunbeams 1922 because of chemical burns.

When he won the 1923 French Grand Prix in a Sunbeam, he became the first Briton to win a Grand Prix in a British car. In 1924 he won the San Sebastian Grand Prix at Circuito Lasarte, Spain. After a further win at Miramas in France, he retired from racing to concentrate on speed records.

== Speed career ==
=== Land ===
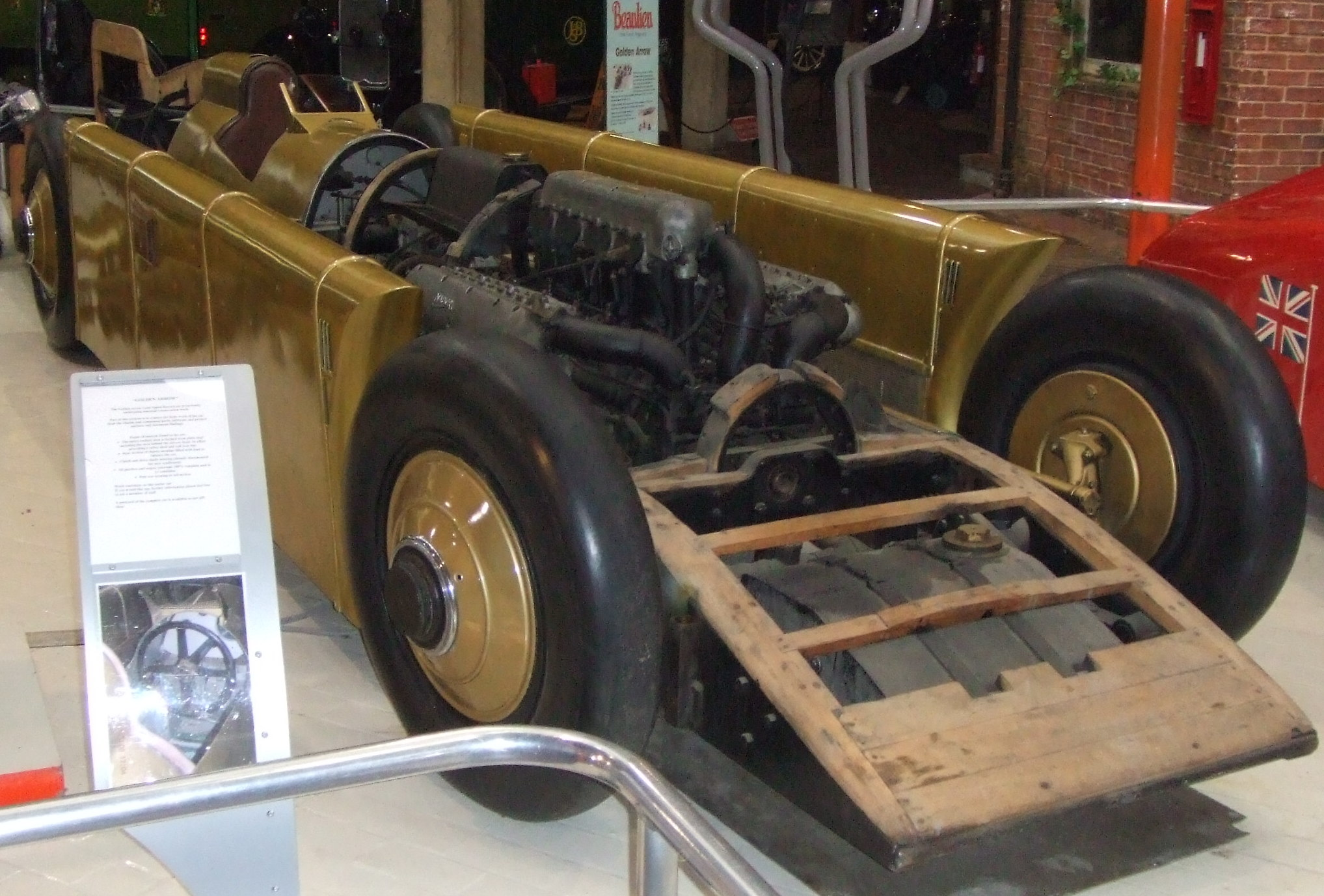
Segrave's Golden Arrow at the National Motor Museum, Beaulieu.

On 16 March 1926, Segrave set his first land speed record of 152.33 miles per hour (245.15 km/h) using Ladybird, a 4-litre Sunbeam Tiger on Ainsdale beach at Southport, England. This record was broken a month later by J. G. Parry-Thomas driving Babs, a custom-built car with a 27-litre 450 hp (340 kW) V12 Liberty aero engine.

A year later he regained the land speed record, and became the first person to travel over 200 miles per hour (320 km/h), at the Daytona Beach Road Course on 29 March 1927. Using Mystery (but also known as 'the Slug'), a 1000 HP Sunbeam, he recorded a speed of 203.79 miles per hour (327.97 km/h).

On 11 March 1929, Segrave set his final land speed record, again at Daytona Beach. Using a new car designed for him by Captain Jack Irving and named the Golden Arrow he set a new record of 231.45 miles per hour (372.48 km/h). Segrave never attempted another land speed record after witnessing the high-speed death of American racing driver, Lee Bible, who was trying to set a new land speed record on 13 March 1929, at Ormond Beach, Florida. The Golden Arrow, which was never used again, has only 18.74 miles (30.16 km) on the clock. The vehicle is on display along with Segrave's Sunbeam 350HP and Sunbeam 1000 hp at the National Motor Museum, Beaulieu.

On the 90th anniversary of Segrave setting his first historic record, his original Sunbeam racing car returned to Southport where it was driven down Ainsdale beach in March 2016.

=== Water ===
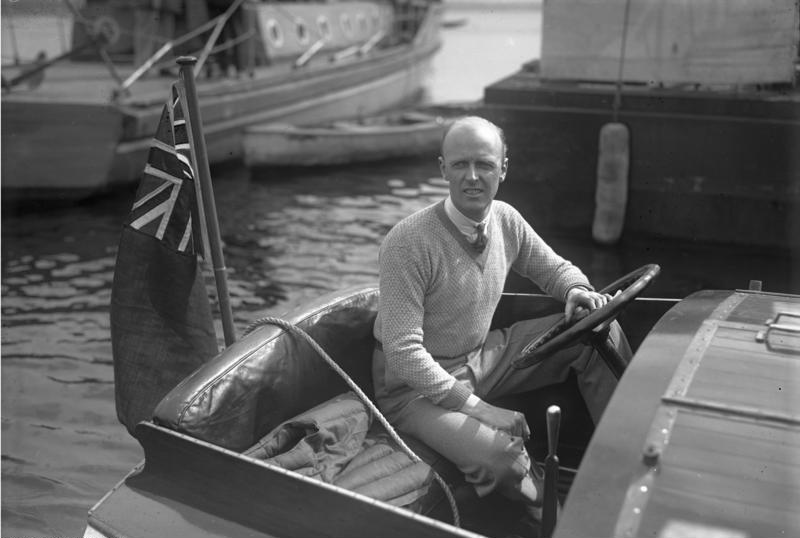
Segrave aboard Miss Alacrity in 1929.

Segrave had Miss England I built in 1928, in an attempt to retrieve the Harmsworth Trophy from the American Gar Wood whose series of high-powered aero-engine-driven Miss America boats had made him a multiple water speed record holder and the first man to travel over 100 mph (87 kn; 160 km/h) on water. Although Segrave had already used aero-engines in some of his land-speed record setting vehicles, Miss England I used a single Napier Lion engine. Instead Segrave believed the boat's speed would come from its advanced lightweight planing-hull design. Wood - along with other American boat designers - thought the design was too flimsy for the speeds. Wood sportingly offered to help Segrave, particularly sharing his experiences in propeller and rudder design.

After his 1929 land speed record, Segrave immediately went to Miami for his speedboat race with Wood which he won. It was the American's first defeat in nine years. After Segrave returned to Britain, he was knighted for his many accomplishments.

== Death ==
On Friday 13 June 1930, a few months after receiving his knighthood, Segrave drove Miss England II to a new record of 98.76 mph (85.82 kn; 158.94 km/h) average over two runs on Windermere. However, on the third run the boat capsized at full speed. Chief engineer Victor Halliwell was killed by the boat rolling over on him as it crashed. Mechanic Michael "Jack" Willcocks survived with a broken arm after being thrown from the craft. Segrave, who was rescued unconscious as the boat sank, regained consciousness for a moment and asked about the fate of "the lads". Shortly after being told that he had broken the record he died from acute lung haemorrhages. Although a large floating branch was discovered near the crash, there has been no definitive cause for the accident. Other theories include the boat's construction. Concerns were raised that its hull was too light in design and construction, particularly around the craft hydroplane which was found partially detached after the crash.

Kaye Don subsequently broke two more world water speed records in Miss England II.

== Aircraft designer ==
When Segrave's interest in flying returned in the late 1920s he designed an aircraft for luxury touring. The prototype, known as the Saro Segrave Meteor was a wooden twin-engined monoplane. It first flew on 28 May 1930. However, development was delayed due to Segrave's death a month later. Only three metal versions of the Blackburn Segrave were subsequently built.

== Legacy ==
In 1930 the Segrave Trophy was established to recognise any British national who demonstrated the most outstanding accomplishments in the possibilities of transport by land, sea, air, or water. The trophy is awarded by the Royal Automobile Club. Recipients include Malcolm Campbell (1932), Stirling Moss (1957), Richard Noble (1983), Lewis Hamilton (2007) and John Surtees (2013).
