= Sunbeam Grand Prix (1923) =

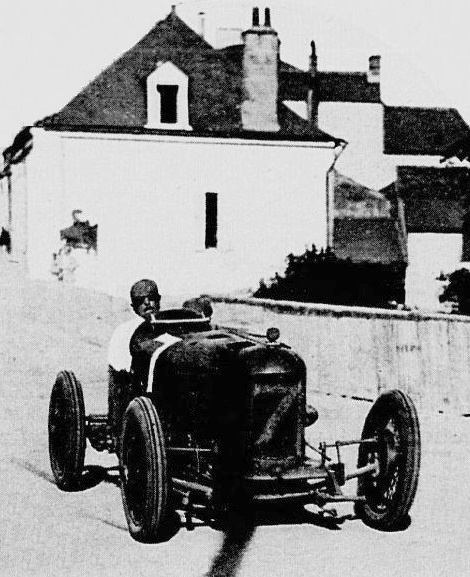

Overview
- Manufacturer: Sunbeam
- Production: 1923-1924

Body and chassis
- Class: Grand Prix
- Layout: FR layout

Powertrain
- Engine: 2.0 L (120 cu in) I6 DOHC; 102–106 hp (76–79 kW) @ 5000 rpm (naturally-aspirated); 138 hp (103 kW) @ 5500 rpm (supercharged)
- Transmission: 3-speed manual

Dimensions
- Wheelbase: 98 in (2,489 mm)

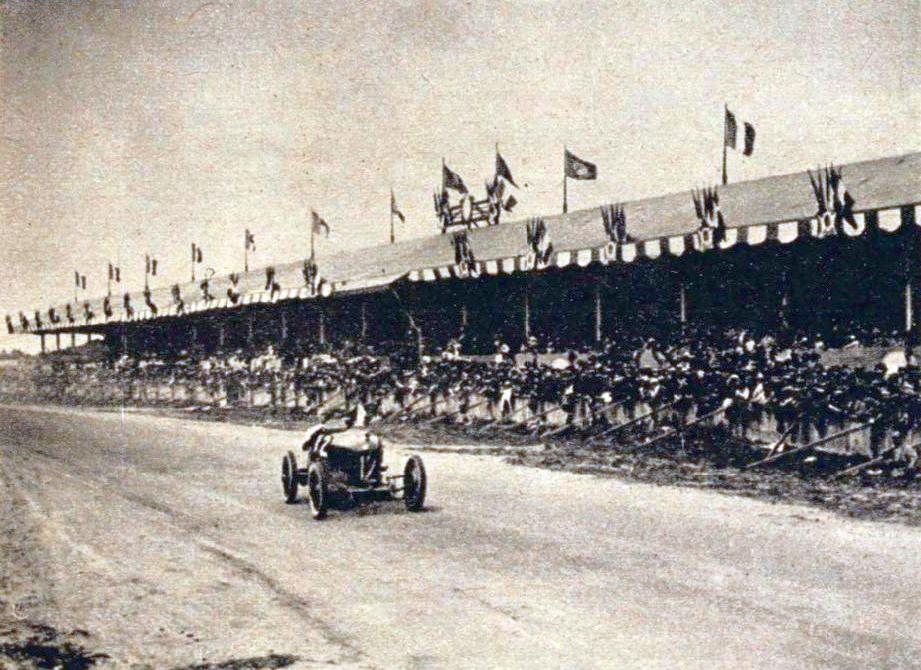
Henry Segrave driving the Sunbeam Grand Prix in 1923

The 1923 Sunbeam Grand Prix was an open-wheel Grand Prix race car, designed, developed and built by British manufacturer Sunbeam, for Grand Prix racing, between 1923 and 1924.
