= Armstrong Whitworth A.W.16 =

A.W.16
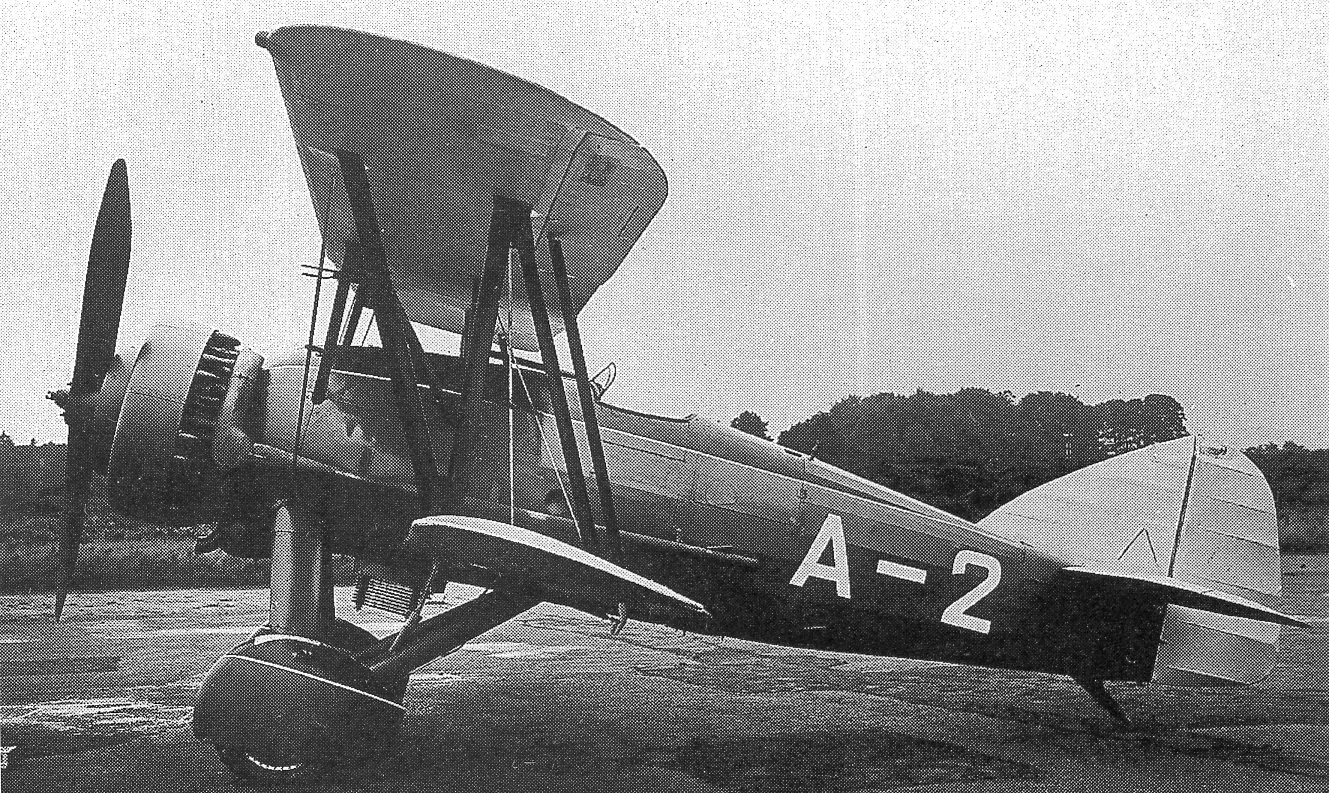

General information
- Type: Fighter
- Manufacturer: Armstrong Whitworth
- Number built: 18

History
- First flight: 1930
- Developed from: Armstrong Whitworth Starling Mk I
- Variant: Armstrong Whitworth Scimitar

The Armstrong Whitworth A.W.16 (or A.W.XVI) was a single-engine biplane fighter aircraft designed and built by the British aircraft manufacturer Armstrong Whitworth Aircraft.

It was a single bay biplane with wings of unequal span braced with N-type interwing struts, and bore a close family resemblance to the A.W.XIV Starling Mk I, though with a less Siskin-like, humped fuselage. The undercarriage was fixed, undivided and spatted. The Armstrong Siddeley Panther radial engine, earlier known as the Jaguar Major was enclosed by a Townend ring. The first prototype performed its maiden flight during 1930.

Developed to fulfil Specification F9/26, engine-related delays heavily contributed to domestic opportunities being lost to the competing Hawker Nimrod. Armstrong Whitworth continued to market the type, particularly to prospective export customers. Both the first and second prototypes would be modified for further development purposes; most notably, the second was rebuilt into the Armstrong Whitworth Scimitar. A number were sold to the Chinese Guangxi Air Force and were subsequently operated by the Chinese Nationalist Air Force.

== Development ==
The A.W.16 was developed by Armstrong Whitworth to meet the requirements of Specification F9/26. With the first prototype flying in 1930, it was too late for consideration against this specification, and was submitted against specification Specification N21/26 for a naval fighter for the Fleet Air Arm. Problems with the Armstrong Siddeley Panther radial engine had delayed the aircraft's development, and the competing Hawker Nimrod was purchased before the AW.16 could be delivered for evaluation. When it was evaluated, it showed inferior performance to the Nimrod, and had poor handling on an exposed carrier deck.

Despite missing out on this opportunity, Armstrong Whitworth decided to continue marketing the aircraft, and even produced a second prototype (G-ACCD) that was fitted with a more reliable Panther IIA engine for submission against Specification F7/30 for an order from the Royal Air Force. However, by this time the A.W.16 was considered to be out of date, and thus was quickly discarded from consideration, which was eventually won by the Gloster Gladiator. A number of production aircraft were made, however, with 17 ordered by the Guangxi Air Force in China

The first prototype A.W.16 was in 1933 experimentally fitted with the 15-cylinder three-row Armstrong Siddeley Hyena radial engine; however, this engine suffered from cooling problems and was ultimately abandoned. The second prototype was rebuilt into the Armstrong Whitworth Scimitar fighter.

== Design ==
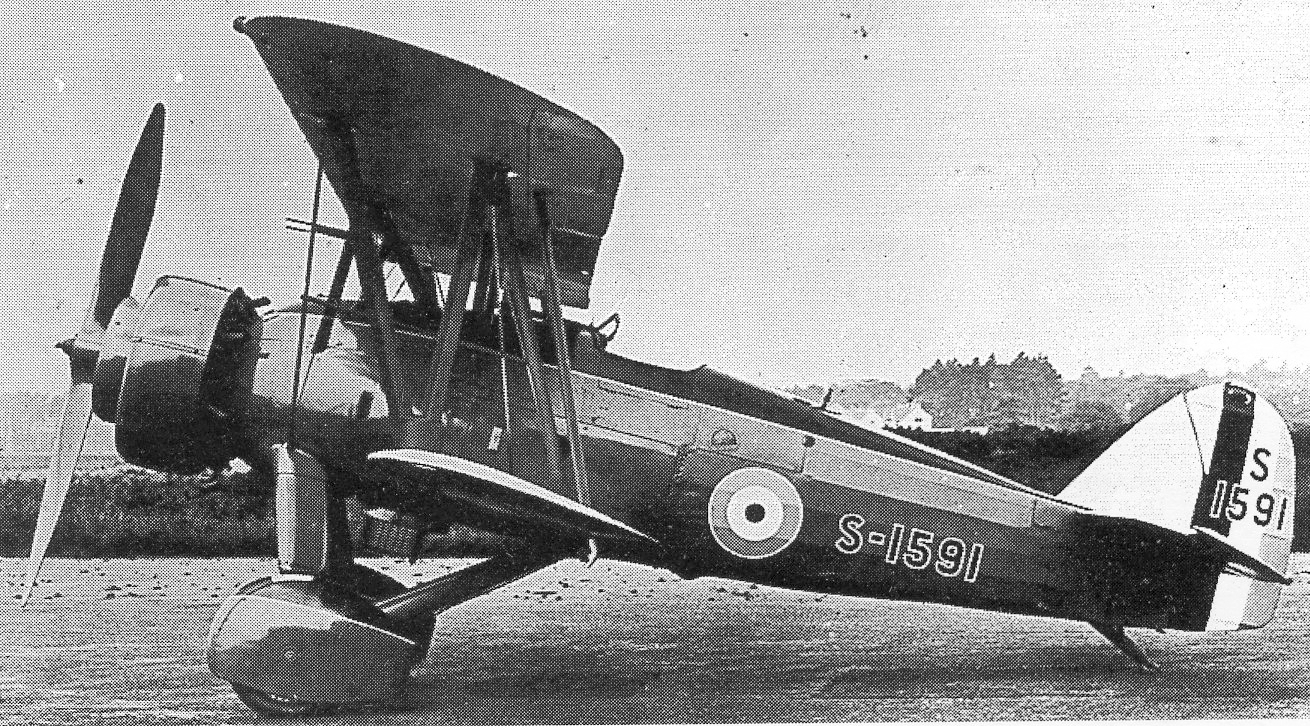
First prototype with double Townend ring

The Armstrong Whitworth A.W.16 was a single-engine biplane fighter aircraft. In terms of its general configuration, it comprised metal construction, a single-bay staggered design, and had a relatively clean streamlined exterior. During the early 1930s, the aircraft was claimed by its manufacturer that the A.W.16 had the potential to be the fastest single-seat fighter in the world at that time. Its speed was a result not only of its clean exterior and powerful engine but also be considerable attention to detail through the aircraft's design. All of strut ends, landing gear fittings, and other drag-producing elements were faired, and all of navigation lights were embedded into the leading edge of the wing and the rudder. The fuselage had a rectangular structure, which comprised steel tubing with mechanical joints that had wire cross-bracing with wires; the exterior had detachable metal panels covering the forward section while fabric covered fabric.

The cockpit, which was located just aft of the upper wing's trailing edge, was considered to be relatively roomy and comfortable. The pilot was also provisioned with a generous field of view in both the forwards and downwards aspects. The fuselage's dimensions were restricted by the maximum diameter of the Panther engine, however, the pilot was located relatively high up which, in combination with the shaping of the top deck and side of the fuselage, meant that the engine made little detrimental impact on visibility. To assist the pilot in getting in and out of the aircraft, particularly during an emergency, there were two handgrips present while the door on the port side was fitted with a relatively robust opening device. Both the seat and the relatively simplistic rudder bar were adjustable. Provisions were made for full night flying, including both wireless and heating equipment.

The aircraft's wings were of unequal span, single bay, and staggered. The top wing comprised two separate sections that were joined near the centre line and carried above the fuselage upon B-shaped splayed struts, one set of which being interplaned on either side of the fuselage. In terms of its structure, it conformed with Armstrong Whitworth's established practice at that time of combining built-up spars with drawn steel strips, while the ribs were girder-like and built up of open sections. Almost the entirety of the wing was covered with fabric except for the leading edge, which was covered with metal instead. Relatively narrow-chord Frise type ailerons were present on all four wings and were mounted on ball bearings as well as being statically balanced by the positioning of the hinge line aft of the aileron' spar.

The inter-aileron balance struts were hinged to the leading edges of the ailerons and contributed towards the mass balance of the ailerons. This aspect of the aircraft was subjected to extensive flight testing during which the design team closely collaborated with the test pilot. Furthermore, the ailerons featured an auxiliary adjustment system in the form of several narrow-hinged surfaces that were inset into the trailing edges of the upper ailerons; these functioned akin to trim tabs while flying at high speeds. The aircraft's control system positively contributed to its performance capabilities, being relatively light when flown at high speed and particularly effective when nearing the typical stall speeds for a single-seat fighter aircraft. Lateral control was an area of particular attention, the control system was stated to be relatively well balanced and free from any undue mechanical losses.

The aircraft was powered by a single Armstrong Siddeley Panther air-cooled radial engine, which could either be moderately or fully supercharged as well as geared. To aid in its cooling, it was fitted with Townend rings. A lengthy exhaust was adopted that functioned as a silencer and a flame damper; it was particularly effective at lowering engine noise.

Electrical power was provided by a pair of generators, which were installed within the fuselage and driven by the engine. One of the generators was dedicated to powering the radio set while the other was used for both lighting and heating. The wheels of the undercarriage were enclosed in spats. The landing gear featured shock absorbers that used a combination of oleo and rubber springs. Independently-operated brakes were also fitted. The tail unit, which was constructed out of steel and covered by fabric, made little use of external bracing, except for a pair of sloping tubes set at either side that braced the forward spar of the stabiliser against the base of the tailplane's actuation apparatus. Both the elevator and rudder were balanced.

Armaments included a pair of forwards-facing fixed .303 in (7.7 mm) Vickers machine gun that were mounted at the peak of the cowling directly forward of the pilot; these fired through the propeller. Provisions were present for the mounting of a gun camera upon the top wing. Furthermore, a rack for the carriage of four light fragmentation bombs was fitted underneath the lower wing.

== Operational history ==
The 16 A.W.16 fighters for the Guangxi Air Force were produced late in 1931, and were delivered via Hong Kong. While initially serving in the air force of the local warlords, the A.W.16s were (along with the rest of the Guangxi Air Force) incorporated in the main Chinese Nationalist Air Force in 1937.

== Operators ==
China

- Guangxi Air Force

China

- Chinese Nationalist Air Force

== Specifications (A.W.16) ==
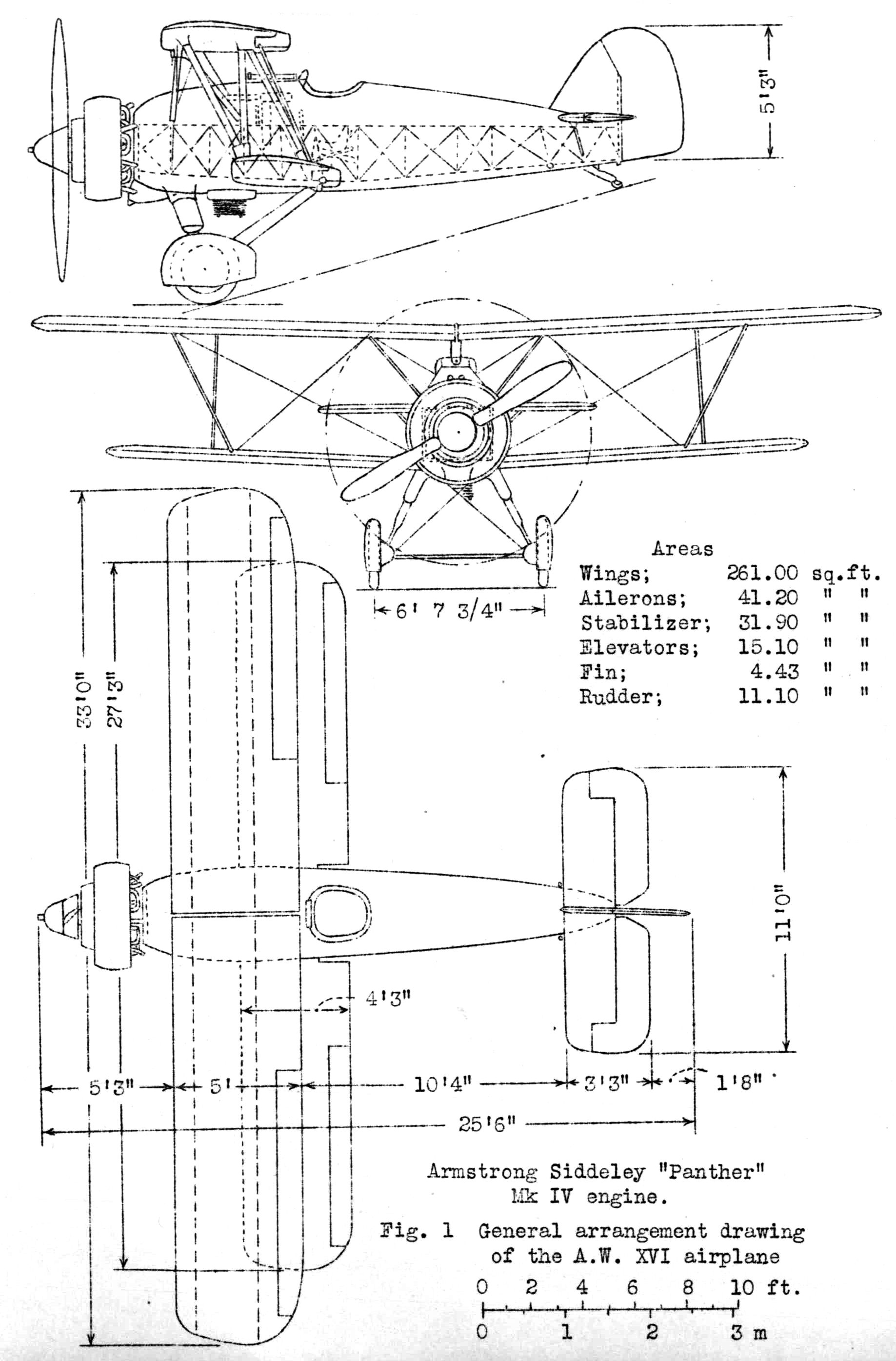
AW XVI 3-view drawing from NACA aircraft Circular No.156

Data from The Complete Book of Fighters, National Advisory Committee for Aeronautics

General characteristics

- Crew: 1
- Length: 25 ft 0 in (7.62 m)
- Wingspan: 33 ft 0 in (10.06 m)
- Height: 11 ft 6 in (3.51 m)
- Wing area: 261 sq ft (24.2 m^{2})
- Airfoil: Clark YH
- Empty weight: 2,795 lb (1,268 kg)
- Gross weight: 3,520 lb (1,597 kg)
- Powerplant: 1 × Armstrong Siddeley Panther IIA 14 cylinder radial engine, 525 hp (391 kW)

Performance

- Maximum speed: 200 mph (320 km/h, 170 kn) at 15,000 ft (4,600 m)
- Range: 270 mi (430 km, 230 nmi)
- Endurance: Two hours
- Service ceiling: 26,100 ft (8,000 m)
- Time to altitude: Six minutes to 10,000 ft (3,000 m)

Armament

- Guns: 2 × forward firing .303 in (7.7 mm) Vickers machine guns in sides of fuselage with 500 rpg
