= Ernest McNab =

Canadian fighter pilot of WWII

Ernest Archibald McNab
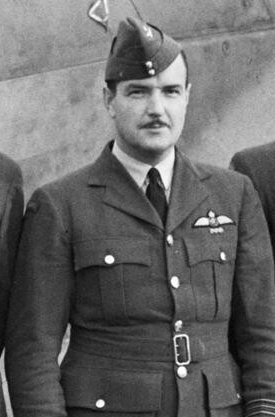
- Born: 7 March 1906; Rosthern, Saskatchewan, Canada
- Died: 10 January 1977 (aged 70); Vancouver, British Columbia, Canada
- Relatives: Archibald Peter McNab (father)
- Military career
- Allegiance: Canada
- Branch: Royal Canadian Air Force
- Service years: 1926–1957
- Rank: Group Captain
- Commands: No. 12 Air Defence Group; RCAF Digby; No. 118 Squadron; No. 1 Squadron
- Conflicts: Second World War: Battle of Britain
- Awards: Officer of the Order of the British Empire; Distinguished Flying Cross; Canadian Forces' Decoration

Ernest McNab, OBE, DFC, CD (7 March 1906 – 10 January 1977) was a Canadian fighter pilot of the Royal Canadian Air Force (RCAF) during the Second World War. During the Battle of Britain, he commanded No. 1 Squadron, the only fighter squadron of the RCAF involved in the aerial campaign over southern England.

From Rosthern in Saskatchewan, McNab joined the RCAF in 1926 and served in a number of flying posts, including as a member of the RCAF aerobatics team and on an attachment to the Royal Air Force. On the outbreak of the Second World War, he was given command of RCAF's No. 1 Squadron and began preparing it for service overseas. He took it and its Hawker Hurricane fighters to the United Kingdom in late May 1940 and after a period of intensive training, led it during its operational involvement in the Battle of Britain. During this time he destroyed several German aircraft and was subsequently recognised for his leadership of the squadron with an award of the Distinguished Flying Cross. Posted away from the squadron after the battle, he was later commander of the RCAF's station at Digby in the United Kingdom. After the war he remained in military service. Appointed an Officer of the Order of the British Empire in 1946, he served in staff posts and was commander of No. 12 Air Defence Group before his retirement as a group captain in 1957. He retired to Vancouver where he died in 1977, aged 70.

== Early life ==
Ernest Archibald McNab was born to Archibald and Edith McNab on 7 March 1906 in Rosthern, Saskatchewan, in Canada. His father was a businessman who was also involved in local politics and would eventually become the lieutenant governor of Saskatchewan. McNab was educated locally and attended college in Saskatoon. He then went onto study law at University of Saskatchewan but switched his major to engineering. He wanted to focus on aeronautical engineering and to increase his chances for this course of study he joined the Royal Canadian Air Force (RCAF) in 1926.

After gaining his 'wings' in 1928, McNab was commissioned as a pilot officer. From 1930, he was based at Camp Borden as a member of the Siskins, the RCAF's aerobatics team which flew the Armstrong Whitworth Siskin fighter. He subsequently flew mail carriers and was involved in aerial photographic surveys of the Hudson Bay area, accumulating over 2,000 hours of flying time. During a posting to Montreal, he helped raised No. 115 Squadron, an auxiliary reserve unit.

In May 1937 McNab went on an exchange with the Royal Air Force, being attached to No. 46 Squadron at Kenley as a flight commander. This squadron operated Gloster Gauntlet fighters but following a move to Digby, converted to the Hawker Hurricane fighter. After two years, and now holding the rank of squadron leader, he returned to Canada to serve at the RCAF's Hurricane Detachment, based at Vancouver and working up on Hurricanes.

== Second World War ==
On the outbreak of the Second World War in September 1939, McNab was serving with No. 1 Squadron. This was training on its Hurricanes at St. Hubert in Quebec but subsequently moved to Halifax, Nova Scotia, in November. By this time, McNab had been appointed the squadron's commander. From Halifax it carried out convoy and anti-submarine patrols, while continuing to train. Although it had a complement of fourteen Hurricanes, it still lacked some equipment and personnel. Accordingly, it took on personnel from No. 115 Squadron, the auxiliary reserve unit that had been raised by McNab in the 1930s. In late May 1940, and after a request from the British government, the squadron was dispatched to the United Kingdom.

=== Battle of Britain ===
Initially based at Middle Wallop, under the control of No. 10 Group, the pilots of No. 1 Squadron began familiarising themselves with the area and, for the personnel formerly of No. 115 Squadron, their Hurricanes. In early July, the squadron moved south to Croydon, part of No. 11 Group. Its training was affected due to its Hurricanes, which had come from Canada, having to undergo updates. Croydon was also bombed on occasions. Some new Hurricanes were received and their existing aircraft had their camouflage updated and markings applied. McNab arranged for pilots to go to the Air Fighting Development Unit at Northolt for further training.

Aware of his lack of experience in combat operations, McNab secured an attachment for himself with No. 111 Squadron, which was also stationed at Croydon. Flying with this unit on 15 August, now known as Eagle Day, when it was ordered to intercept a group of Luftwaffe bombers as they flew in the vicinity of Dover. Pursuing a Dornier Do 17 medium bomber as it flew towards the Thames estuary, McNab shot it down near Westgate-on-Sea. Two days later No. 1 Squadron relocated to Northolt and was declared operational. It was scrambled on multiple occasions over the next several days but without seeing any German aircraft. On 26 August the squadron was patrolling near North Weald when it was instructed to intercept an incoming bomber raid. In the resulting engagement, McNab destroyed a Do 17 to the northeast of North Weald but his Hurricane was damaged by gunfire from the bomber and he had to make a forced landing. His wingman was killed, the first combat casualty for a RCAF unit in the war.

McNab was credited with the probable destruction of a Messerschmitt Bf 109 fighter near Maidstone while on a solo sortie on 7 September. Two days later the squadron was scrambled to help deal with a large raid of over 300 bombers he damaged a Bf 109 to the southeast of Guildford. On 11 September McNab damaged a Heinkel He 111 medium bomber while engaging another group of bombers intercepted near Tunbridge Wells. On 15 September, now known as Battle of Britain Day, McNab destroyed a He 111 and damaged a second. On 27 September he destroyed a Messerschmitt Bf 110 heavy fighter near Biggin Hill and shared, with two other pilots, in the shooting down of a Junkers Ju 88 medium bomber to the south of Lingfield.

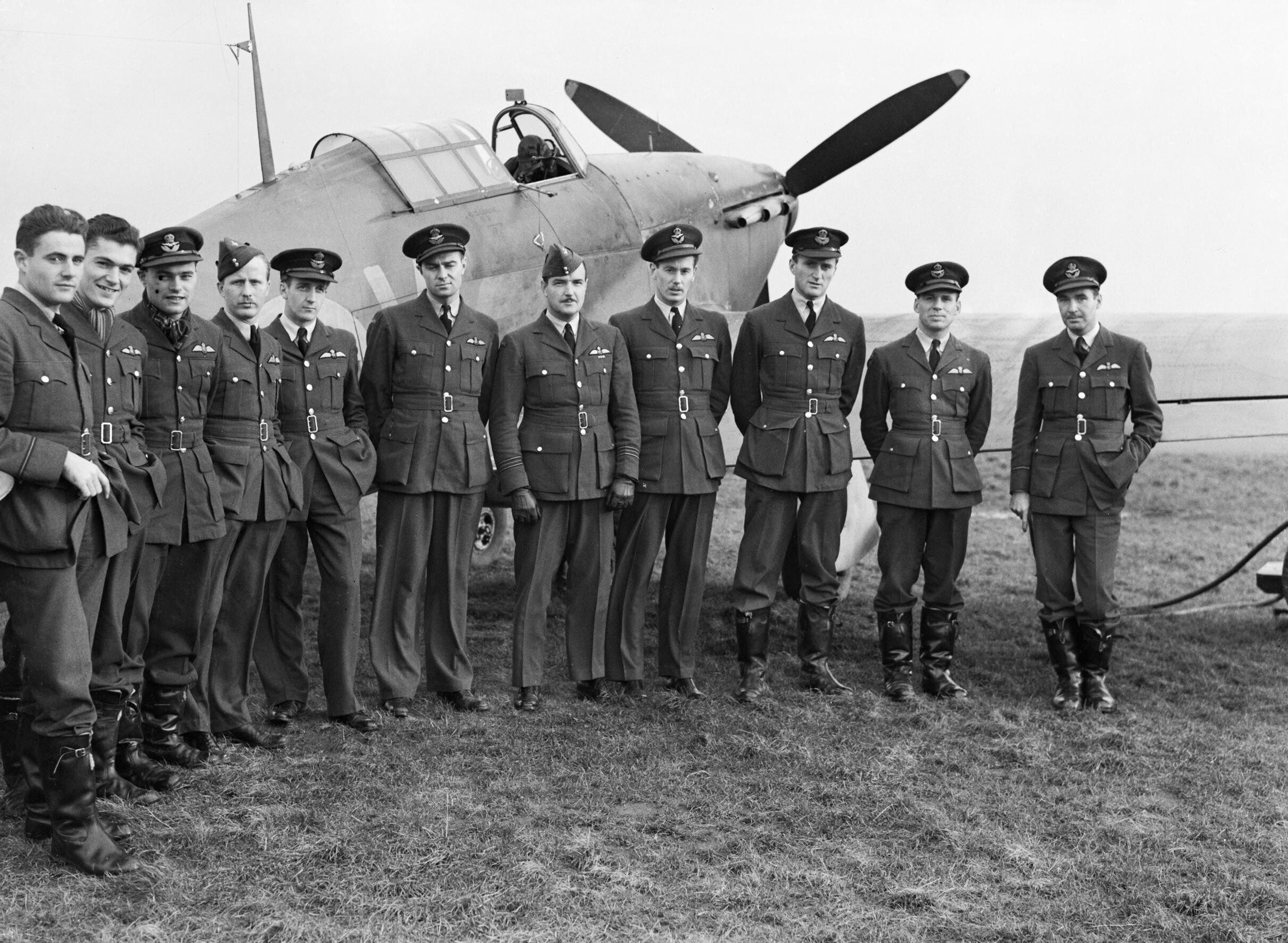
Pilots of the Royal Canadian Air Force's No. 1 Squadron at Prestwick, in Scotland. McNab stands at centre, wearing side cap

By October, the surviving pilots of No. 1 Squadron were exhausted. Nearly half of the original flying personnel had become casualties and there was a lack of trained RCAF fighter pilots in the United Kingdom to replace them. On 9 October, it was withdrawn and sent north to Prestwick in Scotland. During the course of its participation in the Battle of Britain, its pilots claimed to have destroyed 30 German aircraft and damaged 35 more. Eight were claimed as being probably destroyed. By this time McNab held the rank of wing commander and later that month his leadership of the squadron over the previous weeks was recognised with an award of the Distinguished Flying Cross. He was the first member of the RCAF to receive the medal. The published citation read:

Squadron Leader McNab has led his squadron with great success. At least twenty-three enemy aircraft have been destroyed by the squadron. This officer has destroyed four of these.

— London Gazette, No. 34976, 22 October 1940

=== Later war service ===
Posted to RCAF Overseas Headquarters in London in November, after a few months McNab was repatriated to Canada. He was appointed to command of No. 118 Squadron at Rockcliffe in Ottawa. In July 1941 he went to No. 45 Flying Training School at Saskatoon and then onto a variety of other postings. In July 1942 he was promoted to group captain. He went back to the United Kingdom the next month to take up command of the RCAF's station at Digby. In April 1945, McNab returned to Canada. He ended the war credited with the destruction of five aircraft, one of which shared with other pilots, and damaged three others. He is also credited with the probable destruction of one aircraft.

== Later life ==
Once back in Canada, McNab was appointed commander of the RCAF's airfield at Vancouver Island. He was appointed an Officer in the Order of the British Empire in the 1946 King's Birthday Honours. He later commanded the Edmonton station up until 1948 when he was sent to Washington DC to serve on the Joint Chiefs of Staff. The following year he was posted to RCAF headquarters in Ottawa. In 1954 he was given command of No. 12 Air Defence Group, which subsequently became the 5 Air Division, in Vancouver.

McNab retired from the RCAF as a group captain in 1957. He made his home in Vancouver where he died on 10 January 1977.
