= Armstrong Siddeley Hyena =

1930s British piston aircraft engine

Hyena
- Type: Radial engine
- Manufacturer: Armstrong Siddeley
- First run: 1933
- Major applications: Armstrong Whitworth A.W.16

The Armstrong Siddeley Hyena was a British aero engine developed by Armstrong Siddeley. Designed in the 1930s, it was an unusual experimental radial engine with inline cylinder banks. It was flown using an Armstrong Whitworth A.W.16 fighter aircraft as a test bed. Unresolved problems with cooling of the rear cylinders prevented the engine from going into production. Few details of this engine survive as company records were lost.

== Armstrong Siddeley in-line radial engines ==
The Hyena arrangement of cylinder banks arranged as a radial engine was continued with further designs, but with little commercial success, with only the Deerhound and Hyena being built.

Hyena
15 cylinders (5 banks of 3 cyl.)
Terrier
14 cylinders (7 banks of 2 cyl.)
Deerhound
21 cylinders (7 banks of 3 cyl.)
Wolfhound
28 cylinders (7 banks of 4 cyl.)
Boarhound
24 cylinders (6 banks of 4 cyl.)
Mastiff
36 cylinders (9 banks of 4 cyl.)

== Specifications (Hyena) ==
Data from Lumsden.

=== General characteristics ===
- Type: 15-cylinder 3-row radial engine with inline banks.
- Bore: 5.3 in (137 mm)
- Stroke: 4.88 in (125 mm)
- Displacement: 1,615.58 cu in (26.6 L)

=== Components ===
- Valvetrain: Overhead poppet valves
- Supercharger: Medium supercharged
- Fuel type: 77 Octane petrol
- Cooling system: Air-cooled
- Reduction gear: Epicyclic geared, left hand tractor

=== Performance ===
- Power output: 618 hp at 2,000 rpm at sea level

== See also ==
Comparable engines

- Armstrong Siddeley Deerhound
- BMW 803
- Curtiss H-1640
- Daimler-Benz DB 604
- Dobrynin VD-4K
- Junkers Jumo 222
- Lycoming R-7755
- Wright R-2160 Tornado

Related lists

- List of aircraft engines
