= Armstrong Whitworth Aircraft =

British aircraft manufacturer (1912–1961)

Sir W. G. Armstrong Whitworth Aircraft Company
- Industry: Aviation
- Founded: 1912 (as Sir W. G. Armstrong Whitworth (Aerial Department))
- Defunct: 1961
- Fate: Merged with Gloster Aircraft Company & Hawker Aircraft
- Successor: Hawker Siddeley
- Headquarters: Gosforth, Parkside, Whitley, Baginton, Bitteswell
- Key people: John Lloyd; Henry Romaine Watson
- Parent: Armstrong Siddeley Development

Sir W. G. Armstrong Whitworth Aircraft Company, or Armstrong Whitworth Aircraft, was a British aircraft manufacturer.

== History ==
Armstrong Whitworth Aircraft was established as the Aerial Department of the Sir W. G. Armstrong Whitworth & Company engineering group in Newcastle-upon-Tyne in 1912, and from c. 1914 to 1917 employed the Dutch aircraft designer Frederick Koolhoven (hence the "F.K." models).

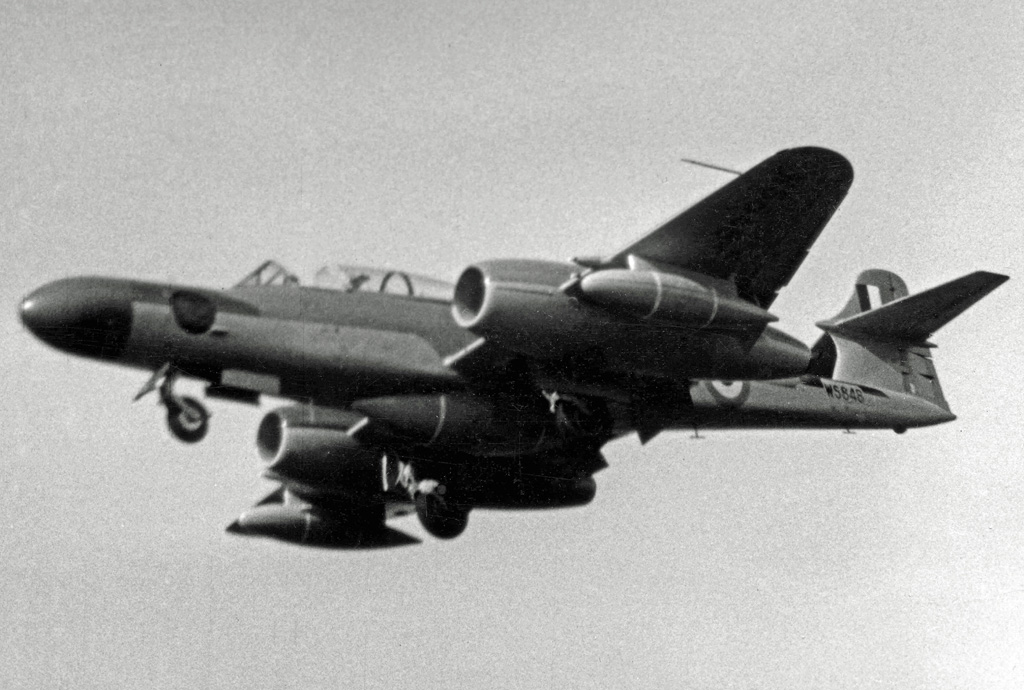
The last of 100 Gloster Meteor NF.14 night fighters built for the RAF at AWA's factories demonstrating at the 1954 Farnborough Air Show

In 1920, Armstrong Whitworth acquired the engine and automobile manufacturer Siddeley-Deasy. The engine and automotive businesses of both companies were spun off as Armstrong Siddeley and the aircraft interests as the Sir W. G. Armstrong Whitworth Aircraft Company. When Vickers and Armstrong Whitworth merged in 1927 to form Vickers-Armstrongs, Armstrong Whitworth Aircraft and Armstrong Siddeley were bought out by J. D. Siddeley and did not join the new grouping. This left two aircraft companies with Armstrong in the name – Vickers-Armstrongs (usually known as just "Vickers") and "Armstrong-Whitworth".

The most successful aircraft made by Armstrong-Whitworth in the inter-war period was the Siskin which first flew in 1919 and remained in RAF service until 1932, with 485 produced.

In 1935, J. D. Siddeley retired and Armstrong Whitworth Aircraft was purchased by Hawker Aircraft, the new group becoming Hawker Siddeley Aircraft. The component companies of Hawker Siddeley co-operated, but operated as individual entities.

In March 1936, the first Armstrong Whitworth Whitley bomber aircraft made its maiden flight and a total of 1,814 were produced for the RAF, ending in July 1943. During the war, Armstrong Whitworth also produced 1,328 Avro Lancasters and designed the Armstrong Whitworth Albemarle reconnaissance bomber which was then made by A. W. Hawksley Ltd, part of the Hawker Siddeley group.

Armstrong Whitworth built 281 Avro Lincolns at Baginton from 1945 to 1951. Then, during the 1950s Armstrong Whitworth Aircraft built many Gloster Meteor, Hawker Seahawk, Hawker Hunter and Gloster Javelin jet fighters at their Bitteswell and Baginton factories for delivery to the Royal Air Force, the Royal Navy and the Royal Belgian Air Force.

The Armstrong Whitworth Apollo airliner was unsuccessful and the company was eventually merged with another Hawker Siddeley company, Gloster Aircraft Company, to form Whitworth Gloster Aircraft in 1961. In 1963 Hawker Siddeley dropped the names of the component companies from its products, the last Armstrong Whitworth product, the Argosy, becoming the Hawker Siddeley Argosy.

== Products ==
=== Aircraft ===
Date of first flight in parentheses.

Armstrong Whitworth Aerial Department

- Armstrong Whitworth F.K.1 (1914) – "Sissit"
- Armstrong Whitworth F.K.3 (1915)
- Armstrong Whitworth F.K.4 (1915) – gondola for SS class airship
- Armstrong Whitworth F.K.6 (1916) – Escort fighter triplane
- Armstrong Whitworth F.K.8 (1916) – "Big Ack" (1,200 built)
- Armstrong Whitworth F.K.9 (1916)
- Armstrong Whitworth F.K.10 (1917) – "Quadriplane" (8 built)
- Armstrong Whitworth Armadillo (1918) (One built)
- Armstrong Whitworth Ara (1919)
- Armstrong Whitworth Tadpole
- Armstrong Whitworth Siskin (1919) (485 built)

Armstrong-Siddeley Aircraft

- Armstrong-Siddeley Siniai (1921) – Bomber (1 built)

Armstrong-Whitworth Aircraft

- Armstrong Whitworth Awana (1923)
- Armstrong Whitworth Wolf (1923)
- Armstrong Whitworth Atlas (1925)
- Armstrong Whitworth Ajax (1925)
- Armstrong Whitworth A.W.14 Starling
- Armstrong Whitworth Ape (1926)
- Armstrong Whitworth Argosy (1926)
- Armstrong Whitworth A.W.15 Atalanta (1932)
- Armstrong Whitworth A.W.16 (1930)
- Armstrong Whitworth A.W.17 Aries (1930)
- Armstrong Whitworth A.W.18 – heavy bomber project
- Armstrong Whitworth A.W.19 (1934)
- Armstrong Whitworth A.W.20 – monoplane day bomber project
- Armstrong Whitworth A.W.21 – monoplane fighter project
- Armstrong Whitworth A.W.22 – monoplane project
- Armstrong Whitworth A.W.23 (1935)
- Armstrong Whitworth A.W.24 – monoplane day bomber project
- Armstrong Whitworth A.W.27 Ensign (1938)
- Armstrong Whitworth A.W.28 – single-seat biplane fighter project
- Armstrong Whitworth A.W.29 (1936) – competing design for Specification P.27/32 for a day bomber
- Armstrong Whitworth A.W.30 – twin-engined monoplane bomber project
- Armstrong Whitworth A.W.31 – single-seat biplane fighter project
- Armstrong Whitworth A.W.32 – braced two-seat monoplane project
- Armstrong Whitworth A.W.33 – twin-engined two-seat monoplane turret fighter project
- Armstrong Whitworth A.W.34 – twin-engined fighter project
- Armstrong Whitworth A.W.35 Scimitar (1935)
- Armstrong Whitworth A.W.36 – two-seat Army co-op biplane project
- Armstrong Whitworth A.W.37 – two-seat general purpose biplane project
- Armstrong Whitworth A.W.38 Whitley (1936)
- Armstrong Whitworth A.W.39 – heavy bomber project
- Armstrong Whitworth A.W.40 – monoplane mail carrier project
- Armstrong Whitworth A.W.41 Albemarle (1940)
- Armstrong Whitworth A.W.43 – monoplane airliner project
- Armstrong Whitworth A.W.44 – four-engine bomber project
- Armstrong Whitworth A.W.45 – monoplane medium bomber (and/or recce?) project
- Armstrong Whitworth A.W.48 – medium (heavy?) bomber project
- Armstrong Whitworth A.W.49 – twin-boom, laminar wing bomber (low level attack) project
- Armstrong Whitworth A.W.50 – tailless monoplane project
- Armstrong Whitworth A.W.51 – two-seat tailless glider project
- Armstrong Whitworth A.W.52 (1947) – flying wing, prototypes only
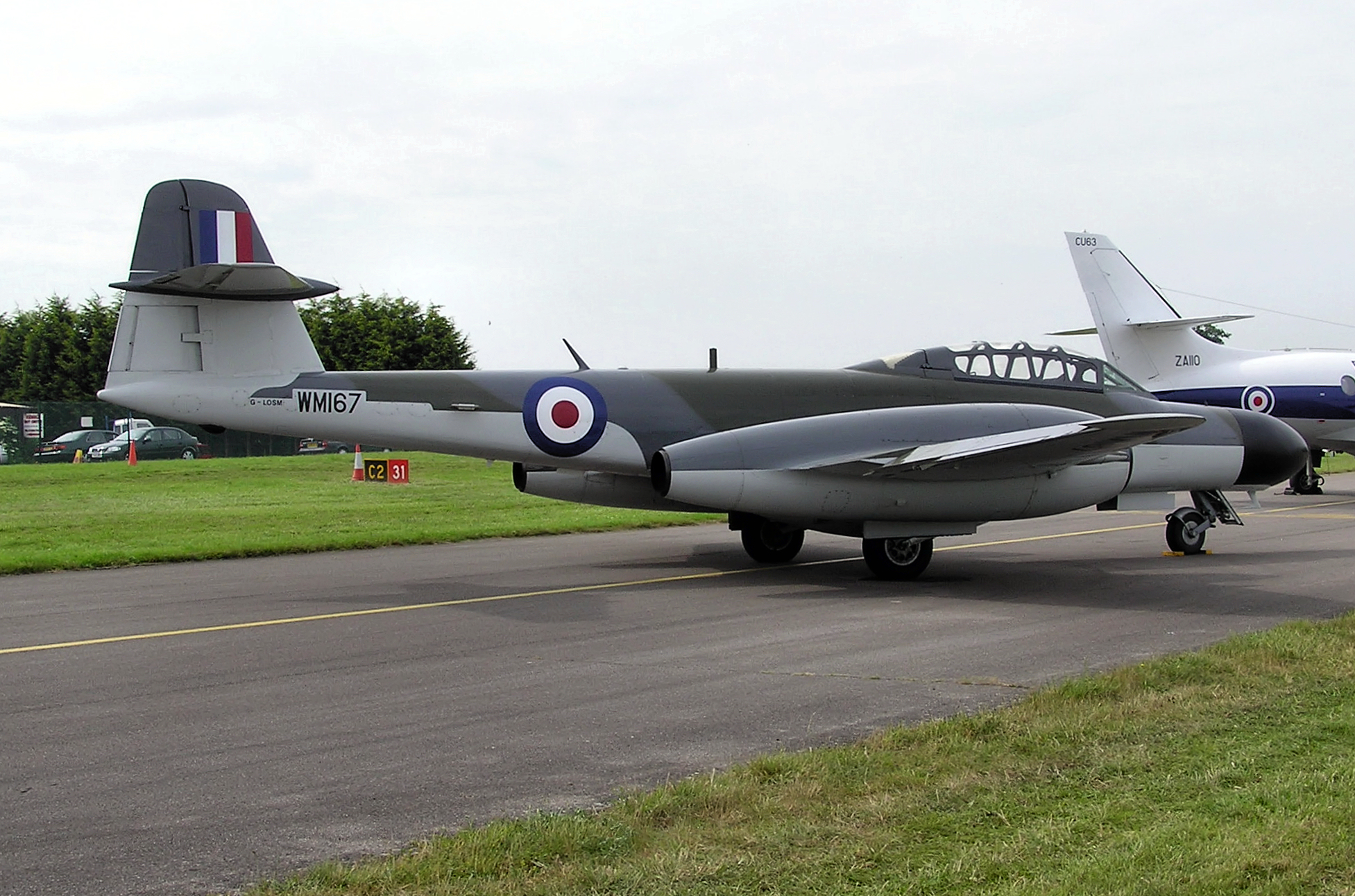
  Privately owned Gloster Meteor NF11 in 2005. Built by Armstrong Whitworth in 1952 at their Baginton (Coventry) factory.
- Armstrong Whitworth A.W.53 – twin-engined fast torpedo scout (bomber?) project
- Armstrong Whitworth A.W.54 – naval reconnaissance aircraft project
- Armstrong Whitworth A.W.55 Apollo (1949)
- Armstrong Whitworth A.W.56 – flying wing medium bomber project
- Armstrong Whitworth A.W.57 – medium-range 4-engine passenger transport project
- Armstrong Whitworth A.W.58 – advanced 59° swept wing Mach 1.2 research aircraft project
- Armstrong Whitworth A.W.59 – variable wing-sweep research aircraft proposal
- Armstrong Whitworth Argosy (AW.650 / 660) (1959)
- Armstrong Whitworth AW.681 – proposed STOL military transport aircraft design
- Armstrong Whitworth A.W.690 – proposed VTOL version of Nord Noratlas transport
- Armstrong Whitworth A.W.168 – proposed tactical bomber design
- Armstrong Whitworth AW.169 – proposed design for Operational Requirement F.155 high altitude supersonic interceptor
- Armstrong Whitworth AW.171 – supersonic VTOL flying wing
- Hawker Sea Hawk – produced as part of Hawker Siddeley Aircraft
- Armstrong Whitworth Meteor NF.11 – redesign of the Gloster Meteor produced as part of Hawker Siddeley Aircraft

=== Airships ===
- R25r airship
- R29 – airship
- R33 – airship

=== Missiles ===
- Seaslug (missile)

== See also ==
- Aerospace industry in the United Kingdom
