= Armstrong Whitworth Ape =

Experimental British aeroplane built in the 1920s

Ape
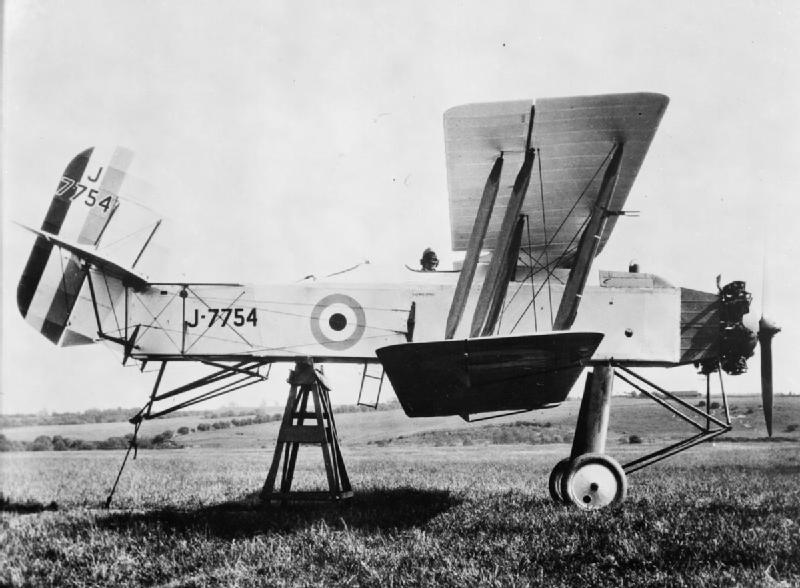

General information
- Type: Experimental biplane
- Manufacturer: Armstrong Whitworth Aircraft
- Primary user: Royal Aircraft Establishment
- Number built: 3

History
- First flight: 5 January 1926

The Ape was a British biplane experimental aeroplane built by Armstrong Whitworth Aircraft in the early 1920s and first flown on 5 January 1926 to "answer all the questions of aerodynamics."

== Development ==
The aircraft was designed to be "infinitely" adjustable: The fuselage could be lengthened or shortened, different fins and tailplanes could be fitted, the incidence angle of both the tailplane and the wings could be altered and the wings could be additionally changed in stagger, rake and dihedral. However, it could not be converted to a monoplane configuration, nor be fitted with a more powerful engine. Additionally, the entire tail was a single unit and the incidence angle of the tailplane could not be changed without also changing that of the fin. It was equipped with a comparatively small 180 hp (130 kW) Lynx engine that did not deliver nearly as much power as the relatively heavy plane needed, and certainly prohibited the Ape from experimenting to its full potential. The second Ape had a bigger engine, the Bristol Jupiter, but additional gadgets added weight that mostly negated the extra power.

The Ape would continue to see occasional use throughout the 1920s.

== Operators ==
United Kingdom

- Royal Aircraft Establishment

== Specifications (First Ape) ==
Data from Armstrong Whitworth Aircraft since 1913

General characteristics

- Crew: 2
- Length: 28 ft 3 in (8.61 m) to 38 ft 3 in (11.66 m)
- Wingspan: 40 ft 0 in (12.19 m)
- Height: 13 ft 0 in (3.96 m) to 15 ft 0 in (4.57 m)
- Wing area: 473 sq ft (43.9 m^{2})
- Airfoil: RAF 15
- Empty weight: 2,020 lb (916 kg) to 2,570 lb (1,170 kg)
- Gross weight: 2,700 lb (1,225 kg) to 3,250 lb (1,470 kg)
- Powerplant: 1 × Armstrong Siddeley Lynx III radial engine, 180 hp (130 kW)

Performance

- Maximum speed: 90 mph (140 km/h, 78 kn) at 3,000 ft (910 m)
- Service ceiling: 6,400 ft (2,000 m)
- Time to altitude: 3 min to 1,000 ft (300 m)
