= Hawker Hoopoe =

British prototype naval fighter

Hoopoe
- Hawker Hoopoe, N237.

General information
- Type: Prototype naval fighter
- National origin: United Kingdom
- Manufacturer: H G Hawker Engineering Company Ltd.
- Status: Scrapped 1932
- Number built: 1

History
- First flight: 1928

The Hawker Hoopoe was a British prototype naval fighter aircraft designed and built in 1927 by Hawker Aircraft.

Service trials found the aircraft to be unsatisfactory, and it was superseded by the same company's Nimrod design.

== Design and development ==
Named after the bird of the same name, the Hoopoe was a private venture design proposal to meet Specification N.21/26, although the aircraft did not follow the specification closely. The Hoopoe was a single-seater biplane with an open cockpit and fixed undercarriage. Floats were also later tested.

The wings' redesign changed the layout from a two-bay biplane to a single-bay configuration. Three engine types were fitted during the short trial period. Two variants of the Bristol Mercury were later replaced by an Armstrong Siddeley Jaguar and Panther, which increased performance.

Trials at Felixstowe in 1929 with floats fitted showed that the Mercury powerplant severely underpowered the aircraft, requiring the change to the Jaguar engine. Service interest in the type had waned by autumn 1930, although the single prototype continued in development, flying with Armstrong Siddeley and the Royal Aircraft Establishment until 1932, when the Hoopoe was scrapped.

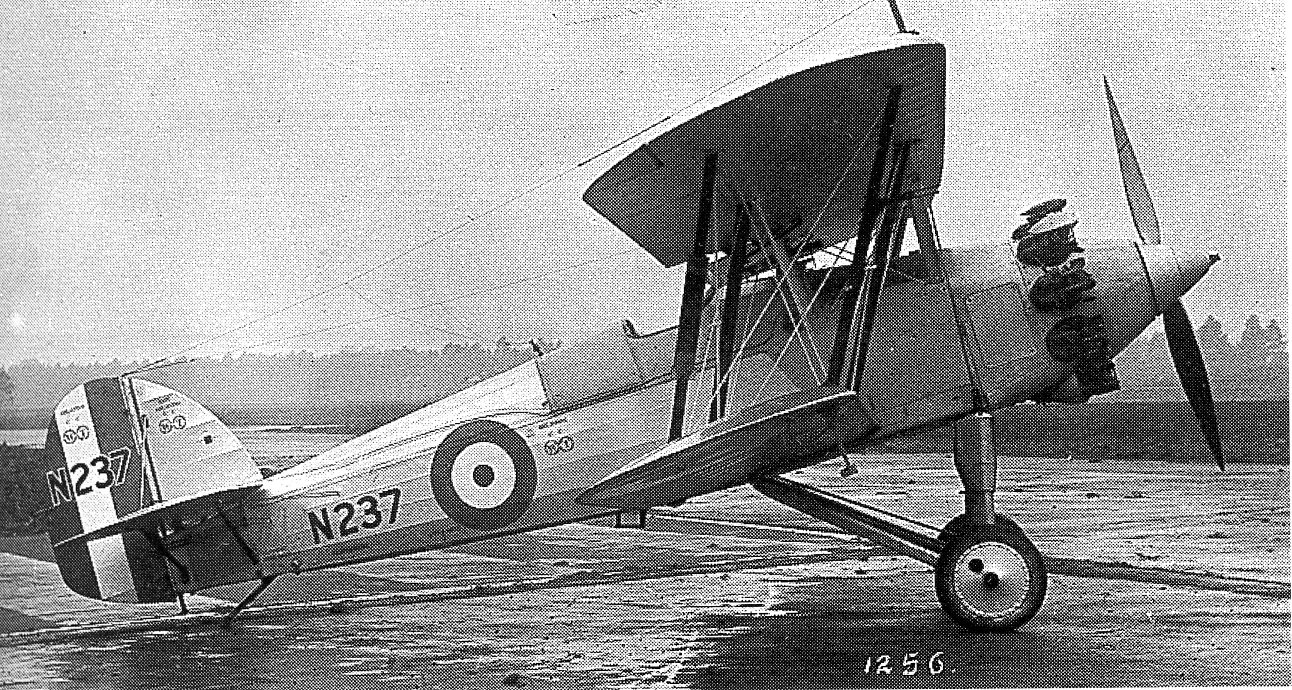
Hoopoe in 1929 with uncowled Mercury engine and two-bay wings

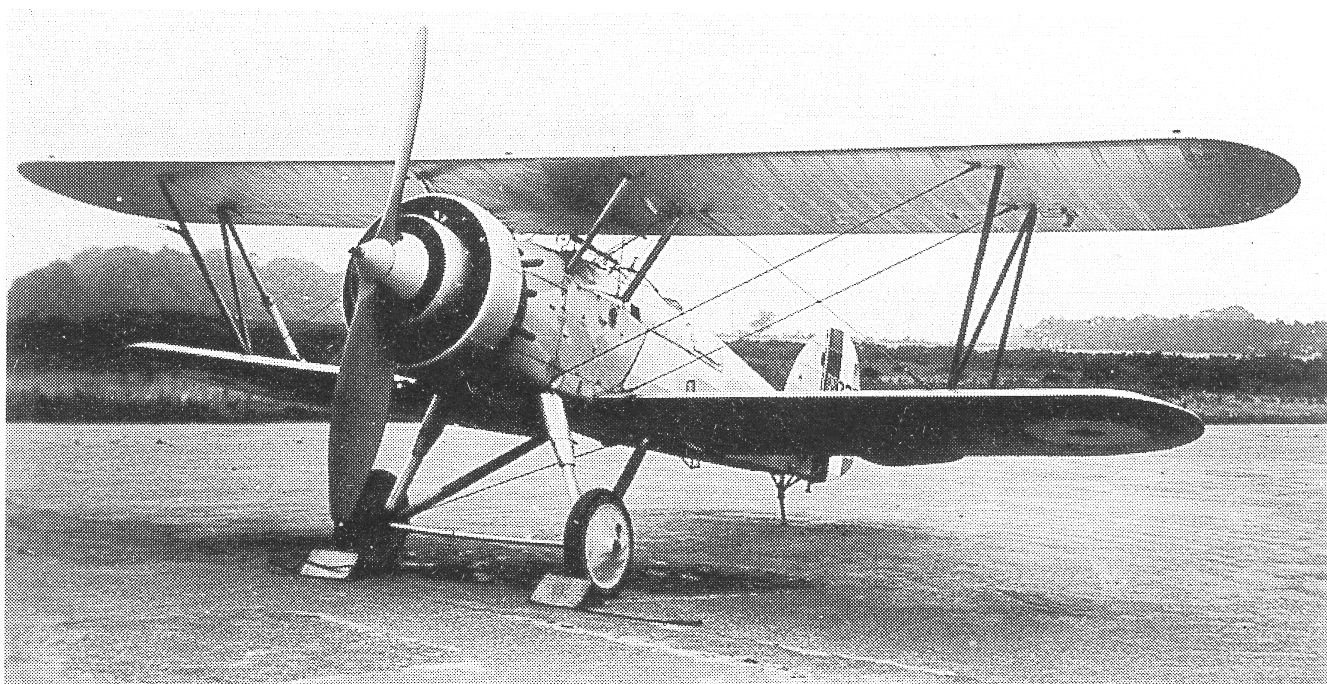
Hoopoe in 1929 with double Townend ring around the Panther engine and single-bay wings

== Specifications (Hoopoe - Single bay wings, Panther III) ==
Data from

General characteristics

- Crew: 1
- Length: 24 ft 6 in (7.47 m)
- Wingspan: 33 ft 2 in (10.11 m)
- Wing area: 288.5 sq ft (26.80 m^{2})
- Empty weight: 2,785 lb (1,263 kg)
- Gross weight: 3,910 lb (1,774 kg)
- Fuel capacity: 55 imp gal (66 US gal; 250 L)
- Powerplant: 1 × Armstrong Siddeley Panther III 14-cylinder radial engine, 560 hp (420 kW)

Performance

- Maximum speed: 196.5 mph (316.2 km/h, 170.8 kn) at 12,500 ft (3,800 m)
- Service ceiling: 23,600 ft (7,200 m)
- Time to altitude: 6 min 40 s to 10,000 ft (3,000 m)

Armament

- Guns: 2 × 0.303 in (7.7mm) machine guns

== See also ==
Related development

- Hawker Nimrod

Aircraft of comparable role, configuration, and era

- Gloster Gnatsnapper
