= Armstrong Whitworth Starling =

A.W.14 Starling
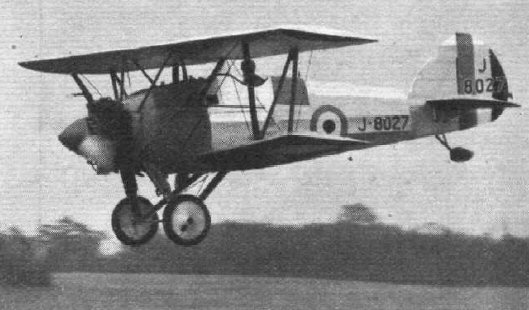

General information
- Type: Fighter
- Manufacturer: Armstrong Whitworth
- Status: Prototype
- Number built: 2

History
- First flight: 12 May 1927

The Armstrong Whitworth A.W.14 Starling was a prototype British single-seat biplane fighter developed for the Royal Air Force in the late 1920s which unsuccessfully competed against the Bristol Bulldog.

== Development ==
The A.W.14 Starling was developed by Armstrong Whitworth as the sole contender for Specification 28/24, for a single-seat fighter capable of operating in day and night-time conditions to replace Armstrong Whitworth's earlier Siskin. It was a single-bay sesquiplane (a biplane with the lower wing much smaller than the upper) with staggered unequal span wings. The fuselage had a bolted steel-tube structure, while the wings had steel spars and wooden ribs and were fitted with ailerons on the upper wings only. The wings used the experimental symmetrical RAF 30 aerofoil section. Armament was two synchronised .303 in (7.7 mm) Vickers machine guns.

Two prototypes were ordered, with the first J8027, powered by a 385 hp (287 kW) Armstrong Siddeley Jaguar VII radial engine which was flown on 12 May 1927. It was underpowered, and was re-engined with a 460 hp (340 kW) Jaguar V engine but its performance remained unimpressive, with the first prototype failed to exceed 160 mph (260 km/h), well short of the required 180 mph (290 km/h), while low speed handling was also poor. The prototype was evaluated against the later Specification F.9/26 in February 1926, but was rejected by the RAF, who instead selected the Bristol Bulldog. J8027 was returned to Armstrong Whitworth, who fitted it with new wings with a Clark YH aerofoil section and leading edge slots on the upper wings. With the civil registration G-AAHC it was shown at Olympia in London in July 1929 and was cancelled from the register in December 1930.

The second prototype, J8028 was extensively redesigned, with a more streamlined fuselage and revised wings, which although retaining the Clark YH aerofoil section, had smaller lower wings. Powered by a 525 hp (391 kW) Armstrong Siddeley Panther II engine, it first flew on 5 December 1929. It was evaluated as both a land-based interceptor against Specifications F.9/26 and F.20/27 and as a naval fighter to meet the requirements of Specification N.21/26. Performance was improved but it was also unsuccessful, although it did carry out useful development work for the Armstrong Whitworth A.W.16.

== Variants ==
Starling I
1927 – first prototype – powered by Armstrong Siddeley Jaguar VII or V engine.
Starling II
1930 – second prototype – specification N.21/26 for a naval fighter. Powered by Armstrong Siddeley Panther II engine.

== Operators ==
United Kingdom

== Specifications (Starling I) ==
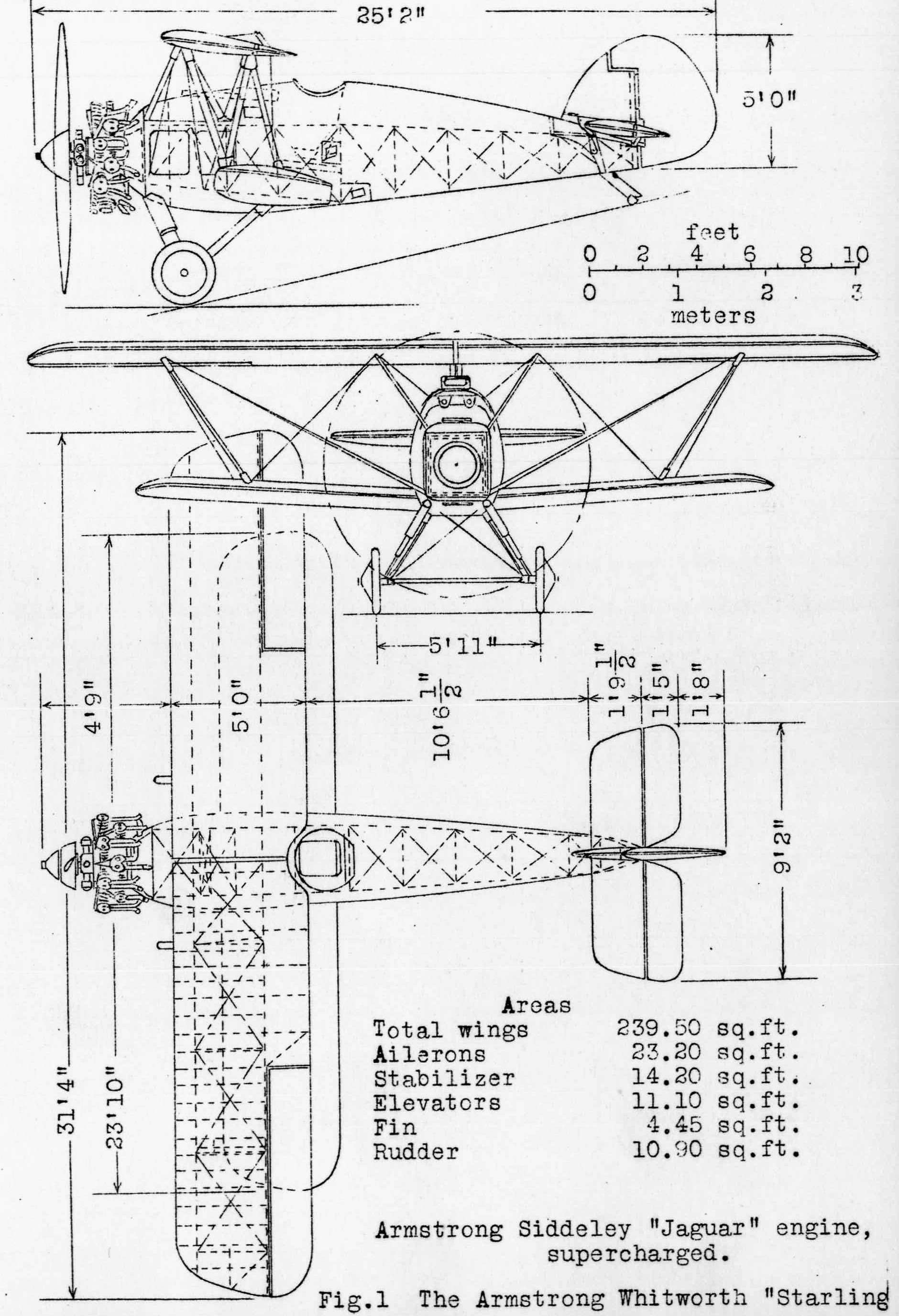
AW Starling 3-view drawing from NACA Aircraft Circular No.82

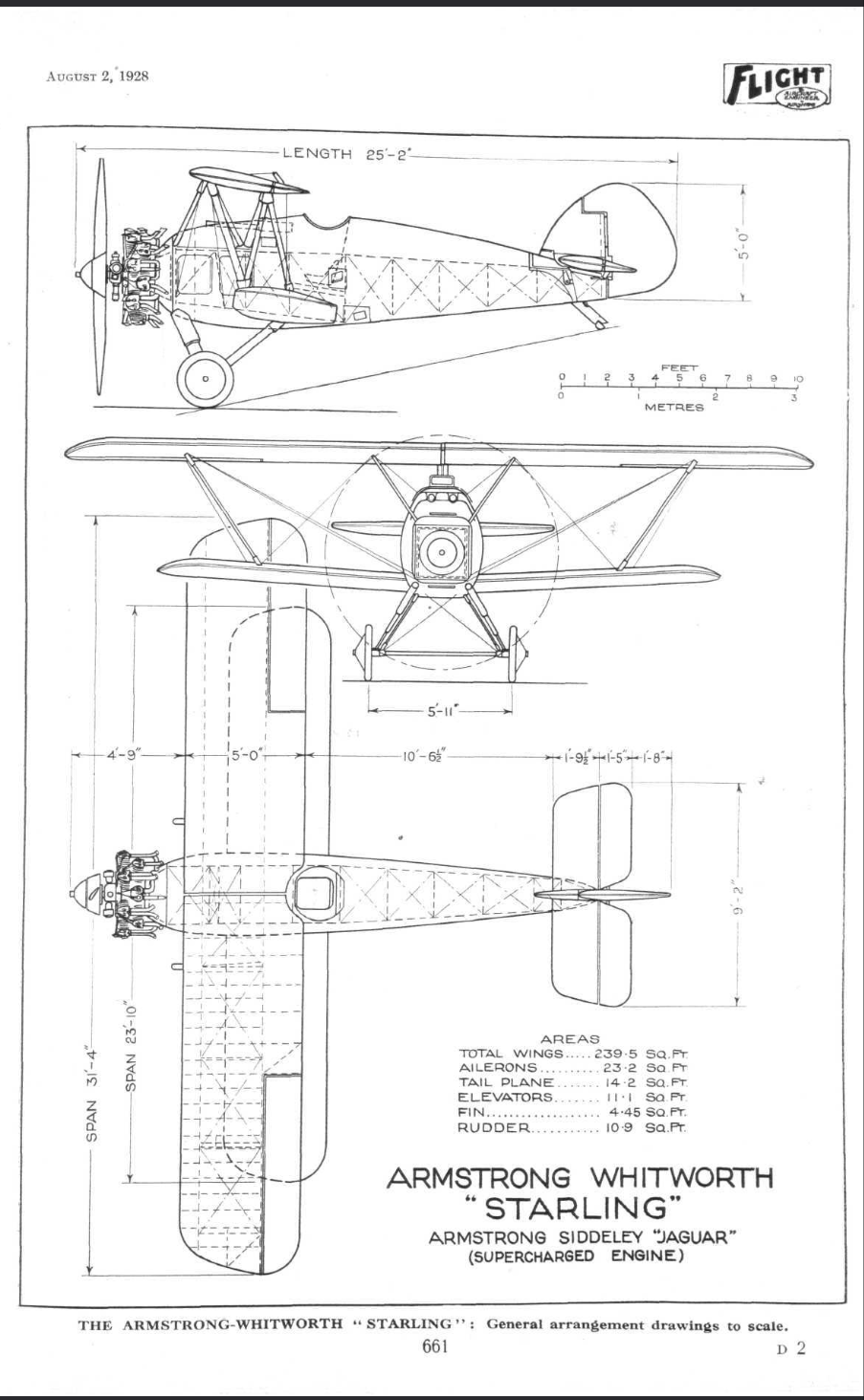
Drawing of Armstrong Whiteworth Starling prototype in Flight.

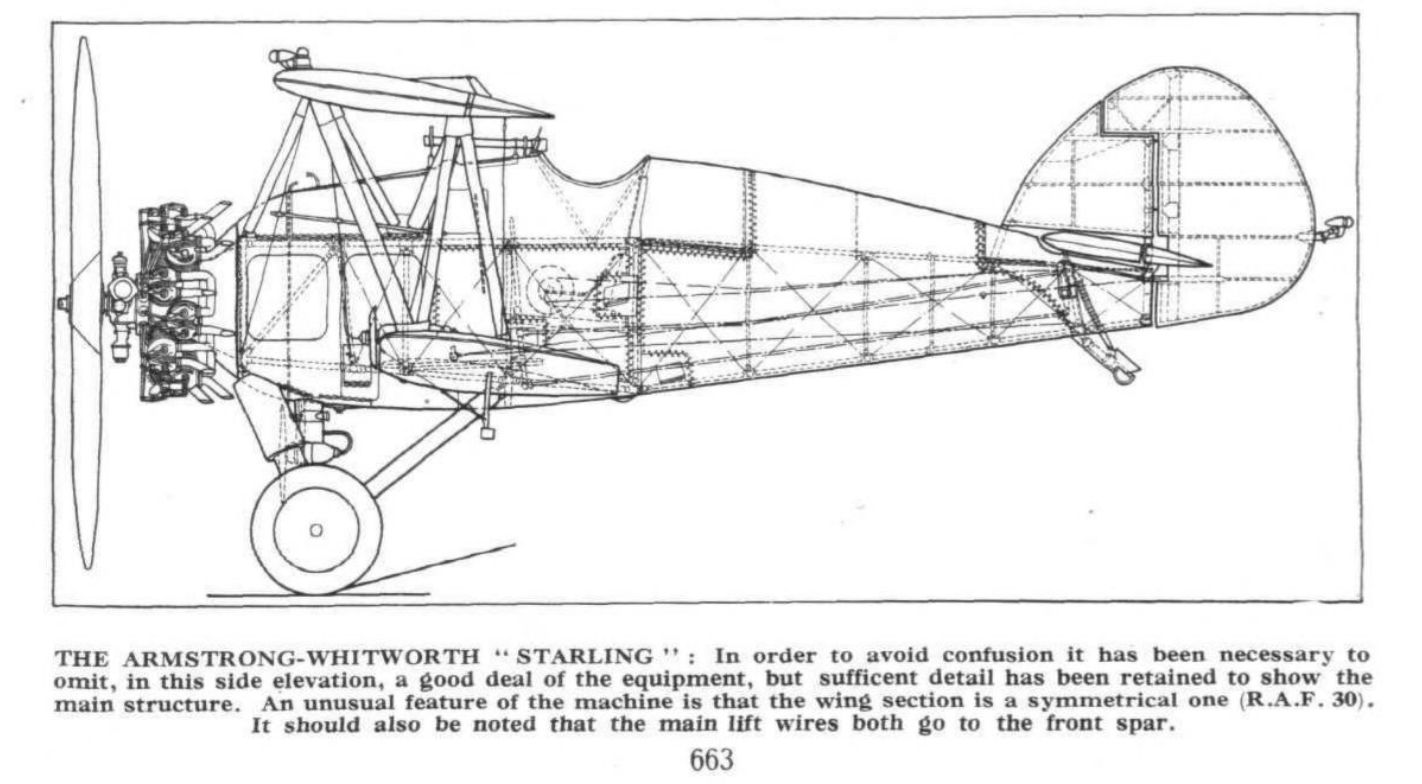
AW 14 Starling - Side view from Flight that confirms airfoil as RAF 30

Data from The British Fighter since 1912

General characteristics

- Crew: 1
- Length: 25 ft 2 in (7.67 m)
- Wingspan: 31 ft 4 in (9.55 m)
- Height: 10 ft 6 in (3.20 m)
- Wing area: 246.4 sq ft (22.89 m^{2})
- Airfoil: RAF 30
- Empty weight: 2,060 lb (934 kg)
- Gross weight: 3,095 lb (1,404 kg)
- Powerplant: 1 × Armstrong Siddeley Jaguar V 14-cylinder air-cooled radial engine, 460 hp (340 kW)

Performance

- Maximum speed: 160 mph (260 km/h, 140 kn) at 10,000 ft (3,000 m)
- Service ceiling: 27,600 ft (8,400 m)
- Time to altitude: 7 min to 10,000 ft (3,000 m)

Armament

- Guns: 2 × 0.303 in (7.7 mm) Vickers machine guns

== See also ==
Aircraft of comparable role, configuration, and era

- Bristol Bulldog

Related lists

- List of fighter aircraft
