= Armstrong Siddeley Panther =

1920s British piston aircraft engine

Panther/Jaguar Major
- Type: Radial engine
- National origin: United Kingdom
- Manufacturer: Armstrong Siddeley
- First run: 1929
- Major applications: Fairey Gordon

The Armstrong Siddeley Panther was a 27-litre 14-cylinder twin-row air-cooled radial aero engine developed by Armstrong Siddeley. It was originally named the Jaguar Major.

== Variants ==
AS Panther IIIA
500 hp (370 kW)
AS Panther VII
638 hp (478 kW) at 2,400 rpm with 0.5 psi (3.5 kPa) boost

== Applications ==
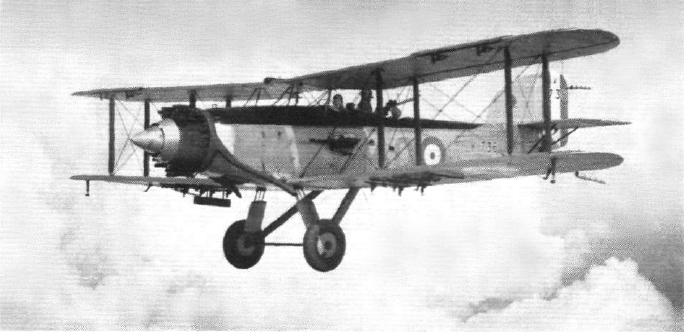
Fairey Gordon

- Armstrong Whitworth Atlas (Mk II)
- Armstrong Whitworth A.W.XIV Starling MkII
- Armstrong Whitworth A.W.16
- Armstrong Whitworth A.W.35 Scimitar
- Fairey Gordon
- Fokker C.V
- Hawker Hoopoe
- Marinens Flyvebaatfabrikk M.F.11
- Supermarine Air Yacht
- Svenska Aero Jaktfalken (SA-14E)
- Westland Wapiti V (first prototype)

== Specifications (Panther VII) ==
Data from

=== General characteristics ===
- Type: 14-cylinder twin-row air-cooled radial engine
- Bore: 5.25 in (133.4 mm)
- Stroke: 5.5 in (139.7 mm)
- Displacement: 1,667 cu in (27.3 L)
- Length: 64 in (1.63 m)
- Diameter: 46.45 in (1.18 m)
- Dry weight: 1,047 lb (475 kg)

=== Components ===
- Valvetrain: Overhead valve
- Supercharger: Centrifugal
- Fuel system: Carburettor
- Cooling system: Air-cooled

=== Performance ===
- Power output: 638 hp (478 kW) at 2,400 rpm with 0.5 psi (3.5 kPa) boost
- Compression ratio: 5.1:1
- Power-to-weight ratio: 0.61 hp/lb (1.01 kW/kg)

== See also ==
Related development

- Armstrong Siddeley Jaguar

Related lists

- List of aircraft engines
