= Armstrong Whitworth Scimitar =

British single-engine biplane fighter, 1935

A.W.35 Scimitar
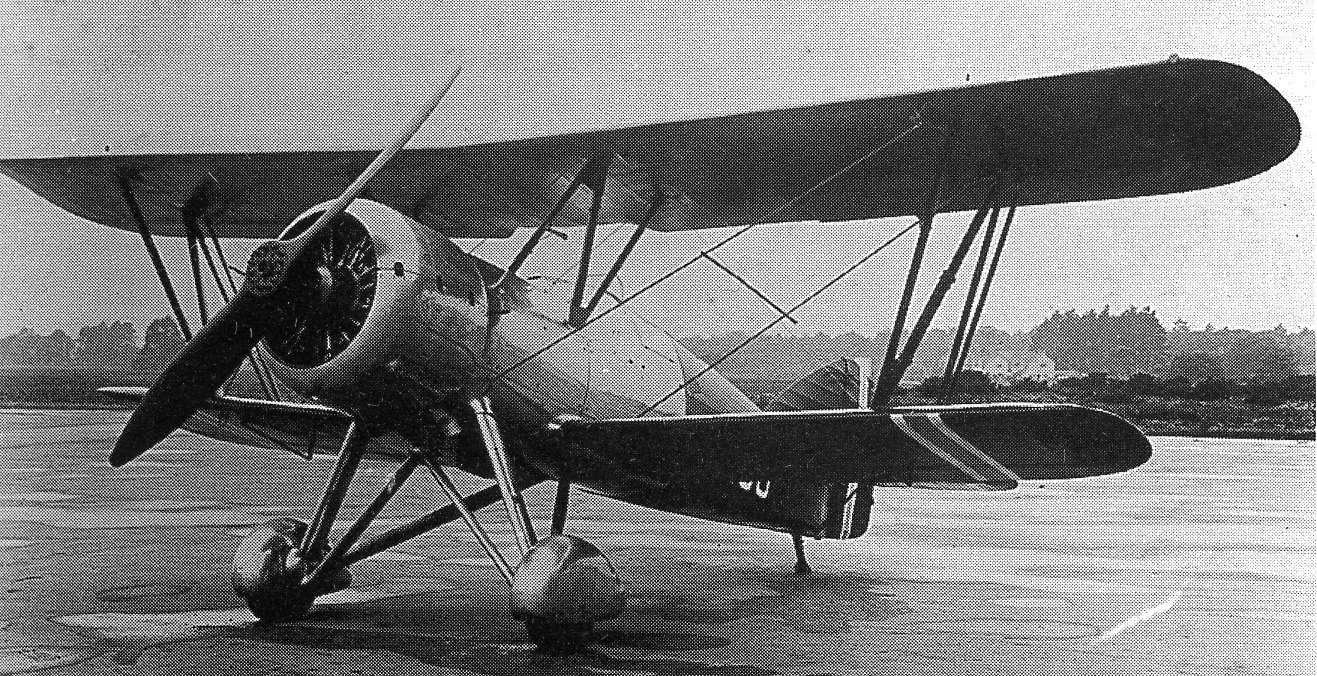

General information
- Type: Fighter
- National origin: United Kingdom
- Manufacturer: Armstrong Whitworth
- Primary user: Norway
- Number built: 6

History
- Introduction date: 1936
- First flight: 1935
- Developed from: Armstrong Whitworth A.W.16

The Armstrong Whitworth A.W.35 Scimitar was a British single-engine biplane fighter aircraft designed and built by Armstrong Whitworth Aircraft. Four Scimitars were produced for the Norwegian Army Air Service and were delivered in 1936.

== Design and development ==
The A.W.35 Scimitar was a development of Armstrong Whitworth's earlier Armstrong Whitworth A.W.16 fighter, powered by an Armstrong Siddeley Panther engine, with a lowered nose decking and an enlarged fin and rudder. The first prototype (G-ACCD) was a modification of the second A.W.16, and first flew in this form on 29 April 1935. A second prototype (G-ADBL) was constructed by converting another A.W.16.

== Operational history ==
Four Scimitars were ordered for the Norwegian Army Air Service, and an agreement signed for licence production at the Norwegian Army Aircraft Factory at Kjeller. After testing by the A & AEE at Martlesham Heath in late 1935, the four Scimitars were delivered to Norway in 1936. The licence agreement was cancelled later that year when it was found that the aircraft was unsuitable for operation on skis without further design changes. The Scimitars remained in use in the training role at the outbreak of the Second World War. When the Germans invaded in 1940 the Scimitars were all undergoing maintenance and could not be made operational in time to see combat.

The second prototype Scimitar was preserved by Armstrong Whitworth at its Whitley factory until 1958, when it was scrapped.

== Operators ==
Norway

- Norwegian Army Air Service

== Specifications (A.W.35) ==
Data from The British Fighter since 1912

General characteristics

- Crew: 1
- Length: 25 ft 0 in (7.62 m)
- Wingspan: 33 ft 0 in (10.06 m)
- Height: 12 ft 0 in (3.66 m)
- Wing area: 261.3 sq ft (24.28 m^{2})
- Empty weight: 2,956 lb (1,341 kg)
- Max takeoff weight: 4,100 lb (1,860 kg)
- Powerplant: 1 × Armstrong Siddeley Panther X 14-cylinder radial engine, 735 hp (548 kW)

Performance

- Maximum speed: 221 mph (356 km/h, 192 kn) at 14,000 ft (4,300 m)
- Endurance: 2 hr 30 min
- Service ceiling: 31,600 ft (9,600 m)
- Time to altitude: 5 min 15 sec to 10,000 ft (3,000 m)

Armament

- Guns: 2 × forward-firing .303 in (7.7 mm) Vickers machine guns

== See also ==
Related development

- Armstrong Whitworth A.W.16
