= Fairey Gordon =

British light bomber and utility plane of the interwar era

Gordon
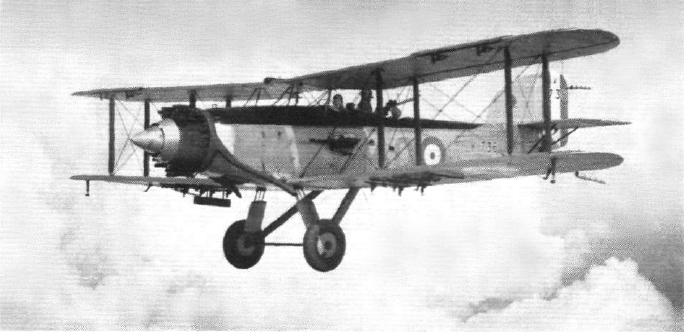

General information
- Type: Light bomber and general aircraft
- Manufacturer: Fairey Aviation
- Primary users: Royal Air Force Fleet Air Arm (Royal Navy)
- Number built: 186

History
- First flight: 3 March 1931
- Developed from: Fairey III

The Fairey Gordon was a British light bomber (2-seat day bomber) and utility aircraft of the 1930s.

The Gordon was a conventional two-bay fabric-covered metal biplane. It was powered by 525–605 horsepower (391–451 kW) variants of the Armstrong Siddeley Panther IIa engine. Armament was one fixed, forward-firing .303-inch (7.7 mm) Vickers machine gun and a .303-inch (7.7 mm) Lewis Gun in the rear cockpit, plus 500 pounds (230 kg) of bombs. The aircraft was somewhat basic; instruments were airspeed indicator, altimeter, oil pressure gauge, tachometer, turn and bank indicator and compass.

== Development ==
The Gordon was developed from the IIIF, primarily by use of the new Armstrong Siddeley Panther engine. The prototype was first flown on 3 March 1931, and around 80 earlier IIIFs were converted to a similar standard, 178 new-built aircraft were made for the RAF, a handful of IIIFs being converted on the production line. 154 Mark Is were produced, before production switched to the Mark II with a larger fin and rudder; only 24 of these were completed before production switched to the Swordfish. The naval version of the Gordon, used by the Royal Navy, was known as the Seal.

== Service ==
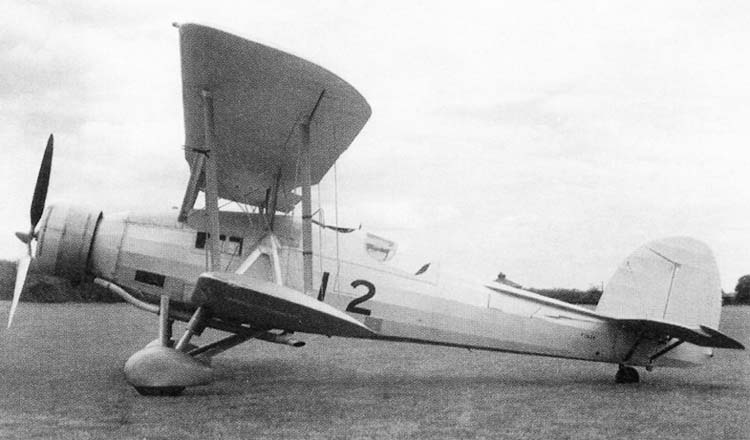
Fairey G1-34 Mk.II

The type had mostly been retired from Royal Air Force and Royal Navy Fleet Air Arm service prior to the Second World War, although No. 6 Squadron RAF, No. 45 Squadron RAF, and No. 47 Squadron RAF, still operated the type in Egypt. Six of these aircraft were transferred to the Egyptian Air Force.

49 Gordons were dispatched to the Royal New Zealand Air Force in April 1939, 41 entering brief service as pilot trainers. The RNZAF found the aircraft worn out and showing signs of their service in the Middle East – including at least one scorpion. The last of these – and the last intact Gordon anywhere – was struck from RNZAF service in 1943.

Seven Gordons were adapted to target towing and stationed at No 4 Flying Training School at RAF Habbaniya in Iraq. At the end of April 1941 these aircraft were hastily converted back into bombers, and in early May they took part in the defence of Habbaniya against Iraqi forces threatening and then attacking the School.

== Variants ==
Fairey IIIF Mk V
Prototype.
Gordon Mk I
Two-seat day bomber and general purpose aircraft.
Gordon Mk II
Two-seat training version.
E1F
Brazilian Navy designation for the Fairey Gordon.

== Operators ==
Brazil
Brazil bought 20 Gordons, comprising 15 land planes and five float planes

- Brazilian Air Force
- Brazilian Naval Aviation

China
Egypt

- Royal Egyptian Air Force

New Zealand

- Royal New Zealand Air Force

United Kingdom

- Royal Air Force
  - No. 6 Squadron RAF
  - No. 14 Squadron RAF
  - No. 29 Squadron RAF
  - No. 35 Squadron RAF
  - No. 40 Squadron RAF
  - No. 45 Squadron RAF
  - No. 47 Squadron RAF
  - No. 207 Squadron RAF
  - No. 223 Squadron RAF

== Surviving aircraft ==
The only known survivor is RNZAF Gordon Mark I NZ629, which is under restoration in New Zealand. On 12 April 1940 two trainee pilots Walter Raphael (pilot) and Wilfred Everist (passenger) of 1 Service Flying Training School were flying NZ629 from Wigram on a flight over the Southern Alps on a "war-load climb to 15,000 feet" training mission. The aircraft entered a spin above the Southern Alps and the crew prepared to bail out, but the aircraft recovered. Moments later it hit trees on top of a ridge on Mount White and flipped backwards down the side of the steep slope, leaving the aircraft hanging in the trees and both Raphael and Everist unconscious. When Raphael regained consciousness he feared the plane would soon catch fire, so he pulled Everist, who was still unconscious, out of the wreckage. Raphael walked to a shearers' hut, carrying Everist who was badly injured.

The airframe, minus instruments, guns and engine, was left suspended in trees at the crash site, which is part of a large sheep station. In 1976 it was relocated – still largely suspended from trees – by Charles Darby, with assistance from Walter Raphael. (Everist had been killed in action over France.) NZ629 was recovered by Aerospatiale Lama. It was stored for more than 20 years before restoration began. In February 1988 the civil registration ZK-TLA was reserved and as of 2005 the restorers were looking for an engine. In 2014 they were struggling to raise the funds to get the plane restored. By 2023 the aircraft was listed for sale.

== Specifications (Mark I) ==
Data from Fairey Aircraft since 1915

General characteristics

- Crew: 2
- Length: 36 ft 9 in (11.20 m)
- Wingspan: 45 ft 9 in (13.94 m)
- Height: 14 ft 2 in (4.32 m)
- Wing area: 438 sq ft (40.7 m^{2})
- Empty weight: 3,500 lb (1,588 kg)
- Gross weight: 5,906 lb (2,679 kg)
- Powerplant: 1 × Armstrong Siddeley Panther IIa 14-cylinder air-cooled radial piston engine, 525 hp (391 kW)
- Propellers: 2-bladed fixed-pitch propeller

Performance

- Maximum speed: 145 mph (233 km/h, 126 kn)
- Cruise speed: 110 mph (180 km/h, 96 kn)
- Range: 600 mi (970 km, 520 nmi)
- Service ceiling: 22,000 ft (6,700 m)
- Rate of climb: 1,000 ft/min (5.1 m/s)
- Wing loading: 13.5 lb/sq ft (66 kg/m^{2})
- Power/mass: 0.089 hp/lb (0.146 kW/kg)

Armament

- Guns: 1 × fixed, forward-firing .303 in (7.7 mm) Vickers machine gun and 1 × flexible .303 in (7.7 mm) Lewis Gun in the rear cockpit
- Bombs: 500 lb (227 kg) of bombs carried under wings

== See also ==
Related development

- Fairey III
- Fairey Seal

Aircraft of comparable role, configuration, and era

- Hawker Hart
- Blackburn Baffin
- Vickers Vildebeest

Related lists

- List of aircraft of World War II
