= Siskins =

Canadian military flight demonstration team 1929–1932

The Siskins
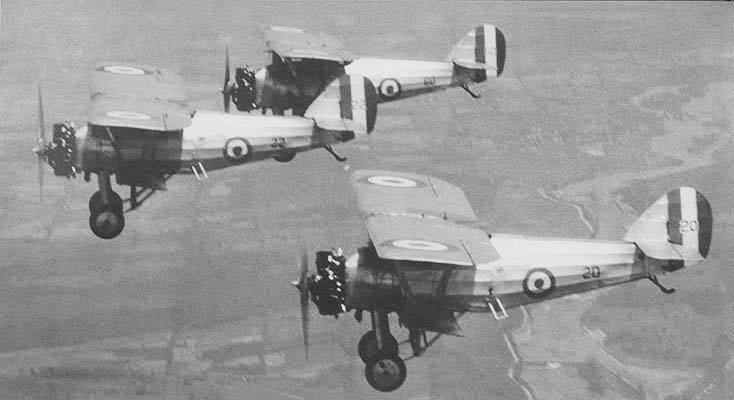
- Active: 1929–1932
- Country: Canada
- Branch: Royal Canadian Air Force
- Role: Aerobatic flight demonstration
- Size: Varied, but usually a three-aircraft show
- Garrison/HQ: Borden, St. Hubert, Trenton

Aircraft flown
- Fighter: Armstrong Whitworth Siskin

The Siskins, officially the Siskin Exhibition Flight, were a Royal Canadian Air Force (RCAF) aerobatic flying team that was established in 1929 at Camp Borden, Ontario. They were named after the bird family Siskin. It was the air force's first official aerobatic team. Flying three Armstrong Whitworth Siskin biplanes, the Siskins quickly built a reputation for performing daring maneuvers. The Siskins flew more than 100 air shows over three years before being disbanded in 1932 when the Great Depression forced the RCAF to reduce operations.

Siskins' Squadron Leader Ernest McNab would later earn recognition as the first RCAF pilot to win the Distinguished Flying Cross during the Second World War.
