= Armstrong Whitworth Siskin =

Former fighter aircraft

Siskin
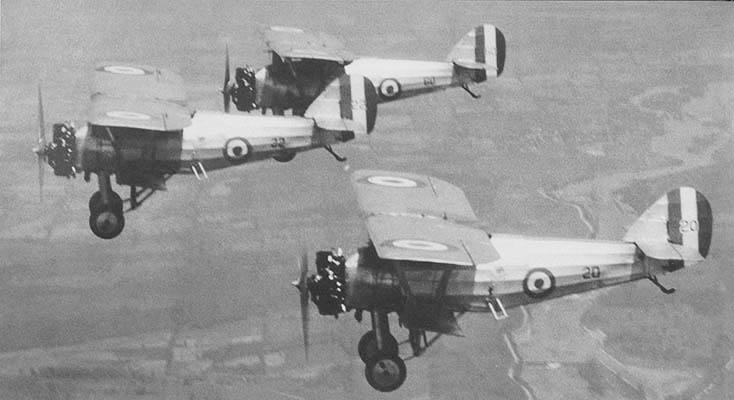
- "The Siskins" flight demonstration team

General information
- Type: Fighter
- Manufacturer: Sir W.G. Armstrong Whitworth Aircraft Limited
- Designer: F.M. Green
- Primary users: Royal Air Force Royal Canadian Air Force; Royal Swedish Air Force
- Number built: 485

History
- Introduction date: 1923
- First flight: May 1919 as Siddeley-Deasy S.R.2 Siskin
- Retired: 1932
- Variant: Armstrong Whitworth Starling

The Armstrong Whitworth Siskin was a sesquiplane single-seat fighter aircraft developed and produced by the British aircraft manufacturer Armstrong Whitworth Aircraft. It was also the first all-metal fighter to be operated by the Royal Air Force (RAF), as well as being one of the first new fighters to enter service following the end of the First World War.

Development of the Siskin was heavily influenced by RAF Specification Type I, including its initial use of the ABC Dragonfly radial engine. Making its first flight in May 1919, the Siskin possessed good qualities in spite of the Dragonfly's poor performance. In the following year, the much better Armstrong Siddeley Jaguar was installed and flight with this powerplant was made on 20 March 1921. In response to Air Ministry Specification 14/22, the aircraft was redesigned with an all-metal structure, and orders were placed in 1922.

In May 1924, the first of the RAF's Siskin IIIs were delivered to No. 41 Squadron at RAF Northolt. Eleven squadrons would operate the type. Relatively popular with pilots, it served for over eight years before the last of them were replaced by Bristol Bulldogs during October 1932. In addition to the RAF, various other nations evaluated the Siskin and several placed orders. The Royal Canadian Air Force (RCAF) introduced the type in the late 1920s and operated its Siskins until shortly after the outbreak of the Second World War. Several Siskins were also entered in various air races.

== Development ==
=== Background ===
The Armstrong Whitworth Siskin was a development of the Siddeley-Deasy S.R.2 Siskin designed by Major F. M. Green (formerly chief engineer of the Royal Aircraft Factory) of the Siddeley-Deasy Motor Car Company. A major impetus for the aircraft's development was the Air Ministry's issuing of RAF Specification Type I, which called for a single-seat fighter that was powered by the ABC Dragonfly radial engine. The Dragonfly would prove to be a disappointment as it failed to meet its anticipated performance.

The SR.2 Siskin was a single-bay biplane of wood and fabric construction. It was angular in form, with little attention paid to obvious avenues for drag reduction. Perhaps its most distinctive feature was its fixed conventional landing gear, which had relatively lengthy oleo strut shock absorbers carrying the axle, which was in turn connected by radius rods to a pair of V-struts situated behind the axle. Its wings were of unequal span. It was powered by a single ABC Dragonfly radial engine, which was installed on the nose in a streamlined cowling. To regulate the engine's temperature, each individual cylinder had its own cooling channel. Armament consisted of a pair of Vickers machine guns mounted directly in front of the pilot.

The Siskin made its first flight in May 1919. While the initial aircraft was powered by the intended Dragonfly engine, it would only deliver 270 hp (200 kW) rather than the expected 320 hp (240 kW). Despite early promise, the Dragonfly was disastrous, being less powerful, unreliable, and prone to overheating while excessive vibration resulted in crankshaft failures after only a few hours of use. Despite the engine, the Siskin displayed generally good properties, possessing favourable stability and handling characteristics, along with performance that could outmatch its direct rivals for RAF orders.

=== Redesign ===
In 1919, Siddeley-Deasy merged with Armstrong Whitworth, with the aviation interests becoming Armstrong Whitworth Aircraft. Siddeley-Deasy had inherited the design of the RAF 8 fourteen-cylinder radial engine and its designer Sam D. Heron. By 1920, this engine, as the Jaguar, had been developed sufficiently to replace the Dragonfly. A prototype Siskin fitted with a Jaguar flew on 20 March 1921. Air Ministry officials were impressed but urged Armstrong Whitworth to continue developing the aircraft as only an all-metal design would be acceptable to the Royal Air Force (RAF).

During 1922, Air Ministry Specification 14/22 was issued for an all-metal single-seat high performance landplane. The Siskin was submitted leading to an order for a single Jaguar-powered prototype. Aside from the engine change, Major Green redesigned it with an all-metal structure, as the Siskin III. The all-metal Siskin was the start of the British transition to metal for military aircraft.

=== Into production ===
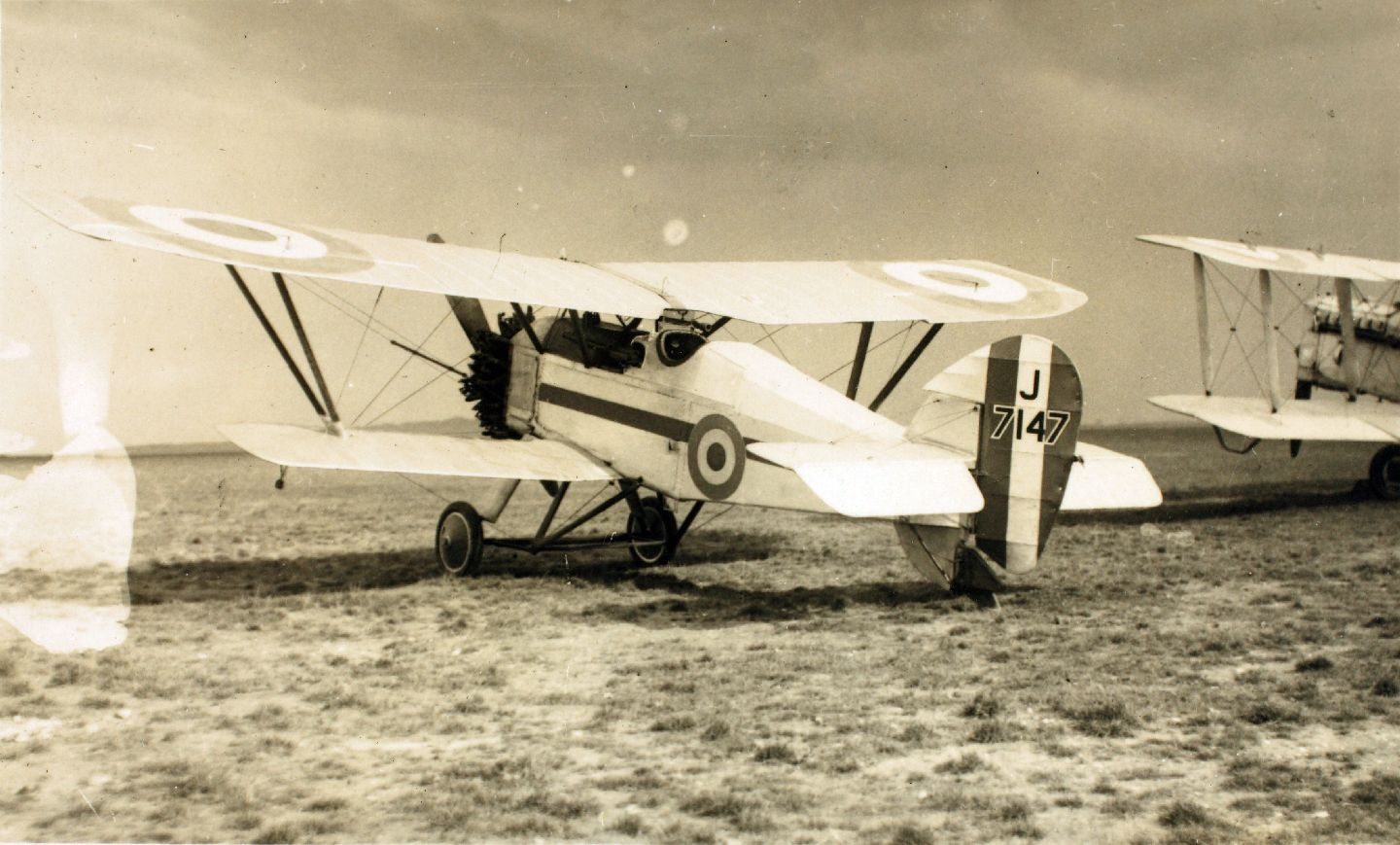
Armstrong Whitworth Siskin III, J7147, construction no. 31, issued to No. 41 Squadron on 7 May 1924. It was destroyed in a flying accident on 9 October 1924.

On 13 October 1922, an initial contract for three production aircraft was placed, and a follow-on order for a further six followed on 26 January 1923, including a single two-seat variant. The Siskin III made its first flight on 7 May 1923. A comprehensive evaluation was conducted, during which the ailerons were tapered to prevent them jamming, as happened during one test flight. Shortly thereafter, Armstrong Whitworth commenced construction of the production standard Siskin, the first of which were delivered to the Royal Air Force (RAF) in January 1924 for flight trials on No. 41 Squadron. The fighter was constructed with a composite wood and aluminium frame, covered in doped linen fabric.

Following the orders from the RAF, Armstrong Whitworth worked on securing export sales for the Siskin. Siskin sales played a major role in the company's fortunes for a time. Romania ordered 65 aircraft, but cancelled the order following a fatal accident at Whitley Abbey, Coventry on 18 February 1925 when a Romanian pilot died in a crash on take off, during acceptance tests. Political pressure by France may have also contributed to the order's cancellation however.

The Siskin IIIA was the main production version, which was first ordered during 1926, and was the first all-metal framed aircraft to be procured in quantity for the RAF. This variant was to have been powered with a Jaguar IV, but was given a supercharged Jaguar IVA engine instead. The supercharger had little effect on performance below 10,000 ft (3,000 m), but greatly improved speed and climb above that height. The Royal Canadian Air Force received 12 IIIAs between 1926 and 1931 after evaluating two Siskin IIIs.

Early production examples were built by Armstrong Whitworth but due to production demands for the Atlas, some Siskin IIIA production was subcontracted out to Blackburn, Bristol, Gloster, and Vickers.

== Operational history ==
=== Royal Air Force ===
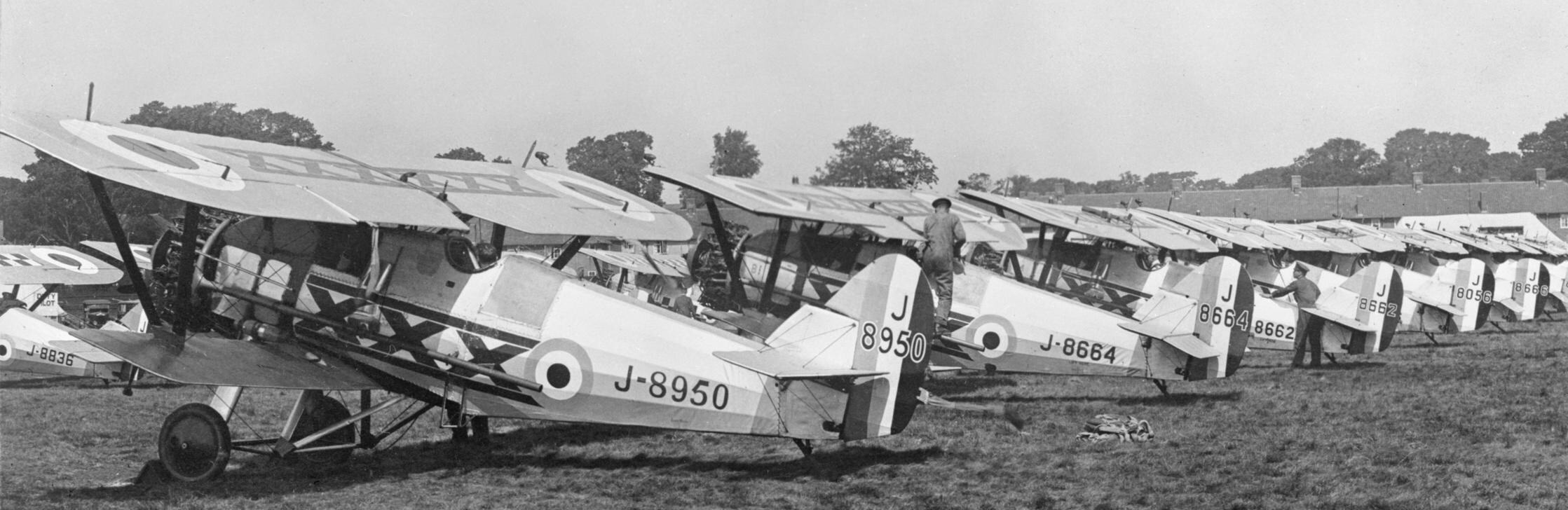
29 Squadron Siskin lineup, late 1920s.

During May 1924, the RAF's first Siskin IIIs were delivered to No. 41 Squadron at RAF Northolt. Shortly thereafter, No. 111 Squadron also received the model; its adoption enabled No. 111 to become the RAF's first high-altitude fighter squadron. The Siskin III was relatively popular amongst its pilots, being a highly manoeuvrable aircraft, although slightly underpowered. Between 1925 and 1931, Siskins were frequently presented at RAF exhibitions of flying; one particular feat performed was the linking of three aircraft by cords between their interplane struts, necessitating careful formation flying to not break these cords until the finishing manoeuvre was performed.

During September 1926, the first deliveries of the improved Siskin IIIA variant were made to No. 111 Squadron. In total, the Siskin was operated by eleven RAF squadrons. By 1931, the type was showing its age, leading to the Air Ministry considering either to recondition them or to procure new-built fighters to replace them. During October 1932, the final Siskins in RAF service were withdrawn, the type having been replaced by the newer and more capable Bristol Bulldog.

=== Sweden ===
The second Siskin II aircraft was sold to the Royal Swedish Air Force in 1925. It was equipped with skis and flown in an experimental capacity for a time.

=== Canada ===
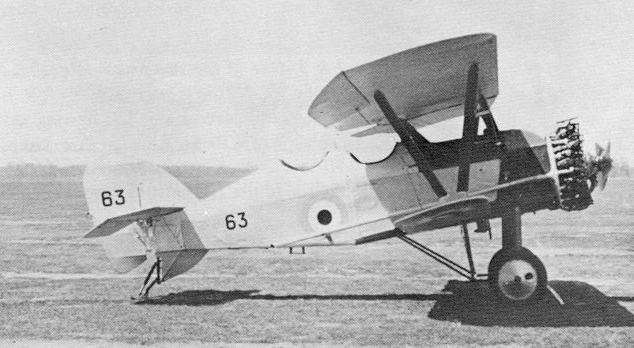
RCAF Siskin IIIDC, c. 1937 (PAC Photo).

Between 1926 and 1939, Canada operated a sizable fleet of Siskins. During 1926, the British Air Ministry had dispatched a pair of Siskin IIIs to Canada, where they underwent testing by the Royal Canadian Air Force (RCAF) under winter flying conditions by test pilot Clennell H. Dickins. The Siskin was considered a modern type at the time of its acquisition by the RCAF, which opted to purchase the Mark IIIA. The Canadian procurement involved both new-built aircraft and second-hand RAF Siskins being supplied to numerous RCAF squadrons.

The Siskin equipped the Fighter Flight at Camp Borden and Trenton. During 1937, the Flight became No. I (Fighter) Squadron, and was transferred from Trenton to Calgary in August 1938. RCAF Siskins were also frequently used in aerial displays and long distance tours around North America.

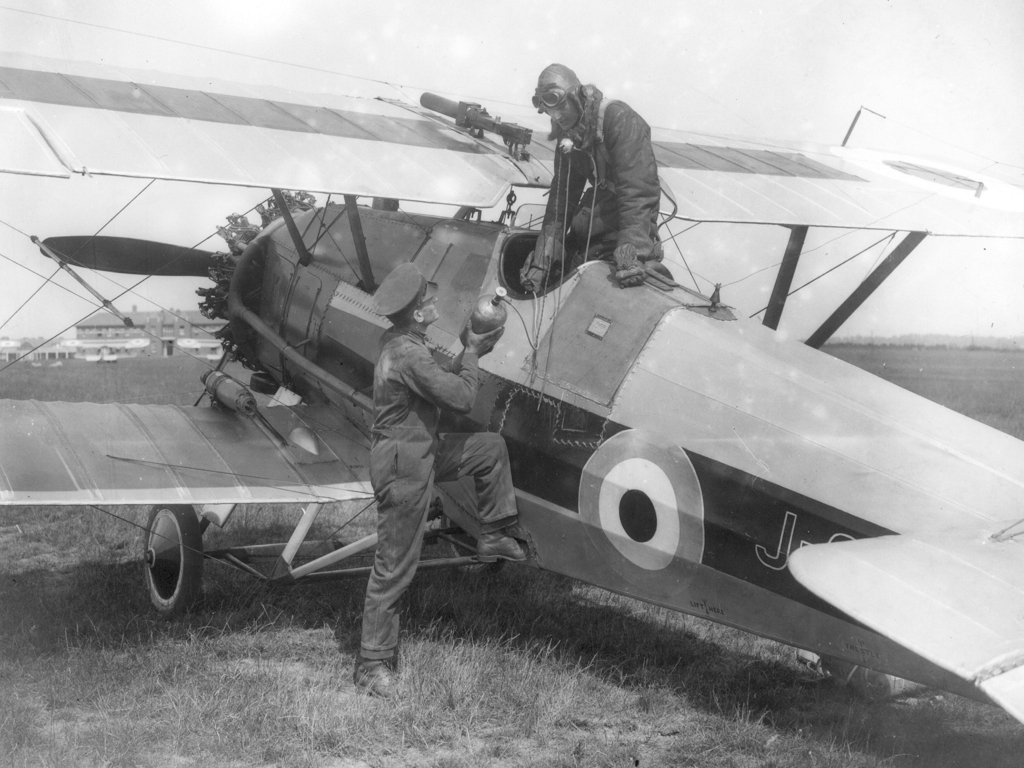
RAF Armstrong-Whitworth Siskin IIIa from No. 41 Squadron at Northolt being serviced with oxygen

The unit continued to operate the Siskin up until the outbreak of the Second World War, shortly after which the type was rapidly retired and replaced by Hawker Hurricane monoplane fighters. Following the Siskin's withdrawal by the RCAF, the airframes were turned over to various technical establishments for use as instructional airframes.

Like its RAF counterparts, in 1929, a three-plane Siskin air demonstration team was formed at Camp Borden, Ontario – the RCAF's first official flight demonstration team. The aerobatic team put on popular solo and formation displays from coast to coast.

=== Air racing ===
The Siskin frequently participated in air racing, often triumphing in such events. Multiple examples were entered into the 1924 King's Cup air race, one of which achieving the fastest course time despite arriving fourth. In the 1925 King's Cup, a Siskin V flown by Flight Lieutenant Barnard emerged as the winner, having reportedly achieved a speed in excess of 151 mph (243 km/h).

== Variants ==
- Siddeley Deasy S.R.2 Siskin – Prototype fighter aircraft built by Siddeley-Deasy and powered by Dragonfly engine. Three built.
- Siskin II – fabric covered steel-tube fuselage and wooden wings. Two built, one two-seater and one single-seater.
- Siskin III – all-metal production version (64 built for RAF)
- Siskin IIIA – main production variant ordered in 1926 (Total 348 built, 340 for RAF, eight for RCAF)
- Siskin IIIB – prototype with improved engine. Single example converted from Siskin IIIA.
- Siskin IIIDC – two-seat dual control version (Total 53 built, 47 for RAF, two for RCAF, two for AST, two for Estonia) a further 32 were converted from Siskin IIIs.
- Siskin IV – civil racing version (one built)
- Siskin V – single-seat fighter for Romania. 65 ordered and at least 10 completed before order cancelled. Two used for racing.

== Operators ==
=== Military operators ===
Canada

- Royal Canadian Air Force
  - Fighter Flight
  - No. 1 Squadron (1937–1939)
  - Siskins Aerobatic team (1929–1932)

Estonia

- Estonian Air Force - operated two Siskin IIIDCs from 1930 to 1940.

Sweden

- Royal Swedish Air Force

United Kingdom

- Royal Air Force
  - No. 1 Squadron
  - No. 17 Squadron
  - No. 19 Squadron
  - No. 25 Squadron
  - No. 29 Squadron
  - No. 32 Squadron
  - No. 41 Squadron
  - No. 43 Squadron
  - No. 54 Squadron
  - No. 56 Squadron
  - No. 111 Squadron

=== Civil operators ===
United Kingdom

- Air Service Training

== Specifications (Siskin IIIA) ==
Data from The British Fighter since 1912

General characteristics

- Crew: 1
- Length: 25 ft 4 in (7.72 m)
- Wingspan: 33 ft 2 in (10.11 m)
- Height: 10 ft 2 in (3.10 m)
- Wing area: 293 sq ft (27.2 m^{2})
- Empty weight: 2,061 lb (935 kg)
- Max takeoff weight: 3,012 lb (1,366 kg)
- Powerplant: 1 × Armstrong Siddeley Jaguar IV 14-cylinder air-cooled radial piston engine, 385 hp (287 kW)
- Propellers: 2-bladed fixed-pitch propeller

Performance

- Maximum speed: 156 mph (251 km/h, 136 kn) at sea level
- Range: 280 mi (450 km, 240 nmi)
- Endurance: 72 minutes
- Service ceiling: 27,000 ft (8,200 m)
- Rate of climb: 2,953 ft/min (15.00 m/s)
- Time to altitude: 10,000 ft (3,000 m) in 7 minutes and 5 seconds

Armament

- Guns: Two × 0.303 in (7.7 mm) Vickers machine guns
- Bombs: Four × 20 lb (9.1 kg) bombs under-wing

== See also ==
Aircraft of comparable role, configuration, and era

- Gloster Gamecock
- Gloster Grebe
- Hawker Woodcock

Related lists

- List of aircraft of Canada's air forces
- List of aircraft of the Royal Air Force
