= Hawker Nimrod =

British carrier-based fighter aircraft

Nimrod
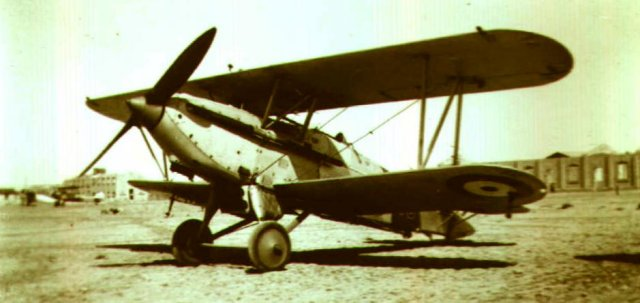
- Hawker Nimrod at El Amriya, 1936

General information
- Type: Naval fighter
- Manufacturer: Hawker
- Designer: Sydney Camm
- Primary user: Fleet Air Arm
- Number built: 92

History
- Introduction date: 1933
- First flight: 14 October 1931

The Hawker Nimrod is a British carrier-based single-engine, single-seat biplane fighter aircraft built in the early 1930s by Hawker Aircraft.

== Design and development ==
In 1926 the Air Ministry specification N.21/26 was intended to produce a successor to the Fairey Flycatcher, then in its fourth year of Naval service. By the time it was replaced by the Nimrod in 1932, the Flycatcher had become so obsolete in terms of its speed that RAF officers who flew it often joked that a sprightly fly might actually give the aircraft a run for its money. None of the aircraft designed to this specification were selected for production after trials in 1928, but the radial-engined Hawker Hoopoe, not actually designed to N.21/26, was considered promising enough to be further developed. Despite the Navy's traditional preference for radial engines, Hawker's designer Sydney Camm was convinced by his experience with the landplane Hawker Fury that the future for shipborne aircraft also lay with inline engines and began such a design, powered by a Rolls-Royce Kestrel. Before it was completed Air Ministry specification 16/30 was written around it. It flew under the initial name "Norn" early in 1930, received a production contract and was renamed Nimrod.

The Nimrod had an overall similarity to the Fury: it was a single-seater biplane with an open cockpit, fixed undercarriage and guns firing through the propeller. Its unswept, constant chord, round-tipped wings had an unequal span and strong stagger, the latter partly to enhance the pilot's view. It was a single bay biplane braced with outward-leaning N-form interplane struts, with the upper plane held a little above the upper fuselage by cabane struts. The fabric-covered wings had metal spars and spruce ribs and carried balanced ailerons only on the upper wings.

The Nimrod's fuselage was a Warren girder structure of tubular steel and aluminium, surrounded by stringers which defined its oval cross section. The Rolls-Royce F.9MS engine, later renamed the Kestrel IIMS was closely cowled in aluminium and the rest of the fuselage fabric covered. As with the Fury, the upper fuselage line was highest at the cockpit, placed between the trailing edges of the upper and lower planes. Its twin machine guns were mounted in the upper fuselage between pilot and engine, firing through the propeller using the standard interrupter gear. The tailplane was mounted on top of the fuselage and carried split horn balanced elevators; the vertical tail had Hawker's familiar curved shape, with a deep, wide chord, unbalanced rudder extending to the keel.

The Nimrod had a conventional undercarriage of cross axle type on trailing struts, with compression legs almost at right angles to the fuselage and an aft tailskid. It could also operate as a floatplane on single-step, crossbraced floats mounted on N-form struts. With floats fitted, the maximum speed was reduced by 47 mph (76 km/h), or 25%. The Kestrel engine's bath type radiator was mounted on the lower fuselage between the undercarriage struts.

After testing in 1930, the prototype went with HMS Eagle to Buenos Aires, flying there as part of the British Empire Trade Exhibition in March 1931. It returned to RAF Martlesham Heath for final testing. A production order for 35 was placed and the first of these flew on 31 October 1931. In the following year, another contract for a further 19 Nimrod Is was signed. With a top speed of 193 mph (311 km/h) it was only marginally slower than its land-based counterpart, the Hawker Fury.

A headrest fairing was added retrospectively to the Nimrod Is, to ease pilot strain during catapult launches. Aircraft from the later production batch were fitted with arrestor hooks. Experiments with the first of this batch, refitted with swept upper and lower wings, led to the Nimrod II. As well as the swept wings, this had at first an uprated Kestrel II engine. Later, these were replaced with Kestrel Vs. Later Nimrod IIs had a slight increase in rudder area to improve spin recovery of inverted, float-equipped aircraft. Originally it was intended that the Nimrod II should have corrosion-resistant stainless steel, but only three of these were built. The first of 27/33 Nimrod IIs was delivered in March 1933.

== Operational history ==
The first production Nimrod Is entered service in 1932 with No.408 Flight on HMS Glorious. Others went to No.s 402 and 409 Flights soon after. Fleet Air Arm flights were reorganised into Squadrons early in 1933, with the Nimrods joining No.s 801, 802 and 803 Squadrons.

The Nimrod II followed in September 1934.

Few Nimrods were exported, though one aircraft was supplied to Japan and one to Portugal. Two went to Denmark, where they were known as the Nimrodderne. They were intended as pattern aircraft for proposed licence building and were essentially Nimrod Is, though powered by Kestrel IIIS engines. One, unusually, was fitted with spats.

The Nimrod had been replaced by more modern designs such as the Sea Gladiator by May 1939, before the start of World War II.

== Variants ==
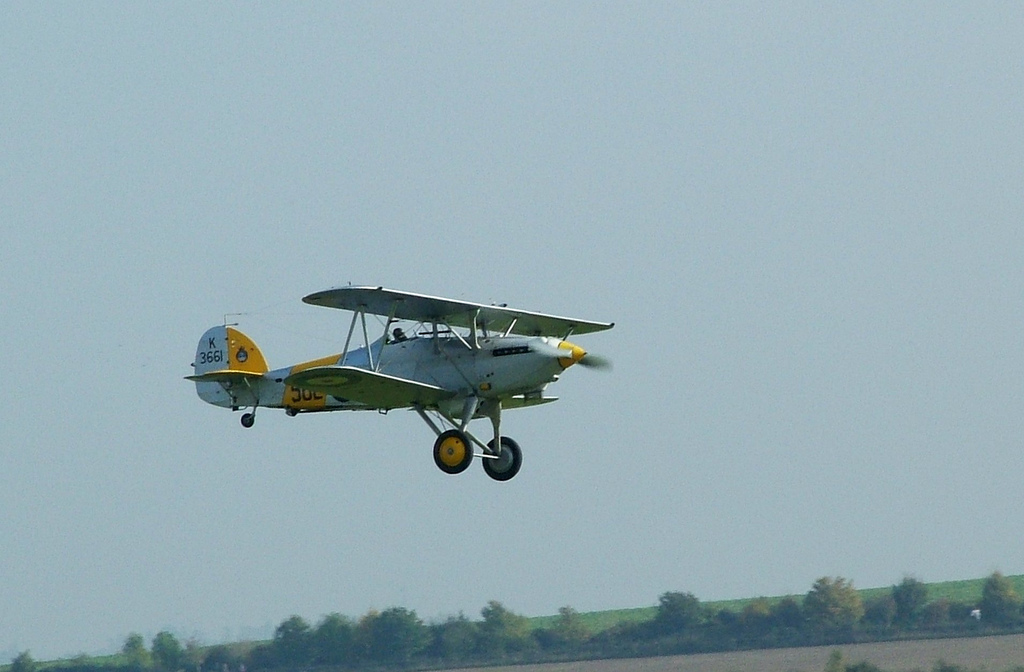
Nimrod II K3661 flying in 2007

Nimrod I
FAA: 477 hp (356 kW) Rolls-Royce Kestrel IIMS piston engine; 57 built.
Nimrod II
FAA: modified swept-wing version, powered by a 608 hp (453 kW) Rolls-Royce Kestrel IIS or VFp piston engine; 30 built.
Danish Nimrod
Hawker built pattern aircraft, powered by a Rolls-Royce Kestrel IIIS piston engine; two built and exported to Denmark.
Nimrodderne
Single-seat fighter aircraft for the Royal Danish Navy; ten built under licence in Denmark.
AXH1
A single Hawker Nimrod I supplied to the Imperial Japanese Navy Air Service for evaluation in 1934.

== Operators ==
Denmark

- Marinens Flyvevæsen (Royal Danish Navy Aviation) received two aircraft called Nimrødderne. A further ten were built locally under licence between 1934 and 1935 at Orlogsværftet; called L.B.V (Landbased Biplane 5). The eight survivors were German spoils of war in 1940.

Japan

- Imperial Japanese Navy Air Service received one aircraft, designated AXH.

Portugal

- Portuguese Air Force received one aircraft.

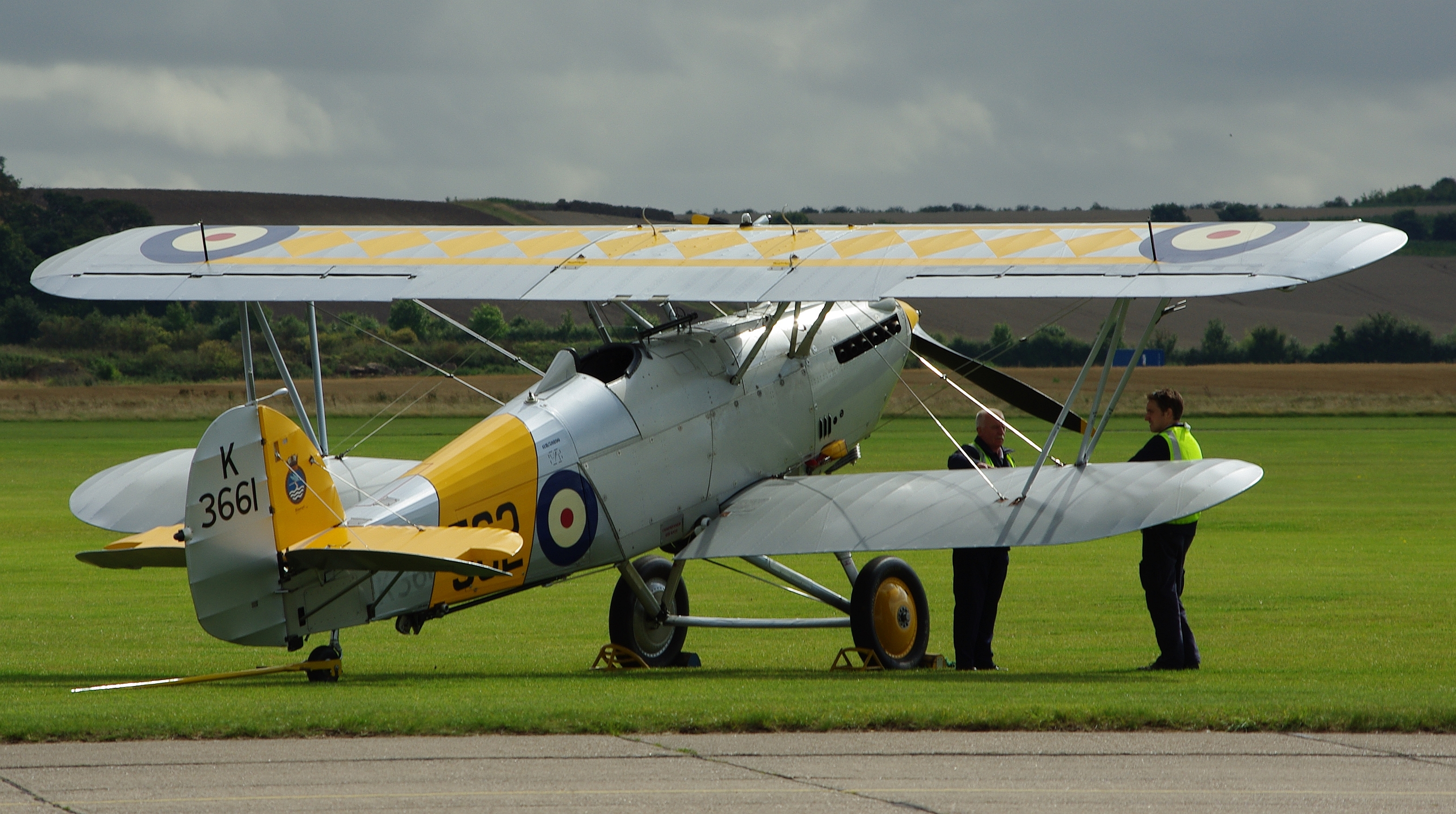
Nimrod II K3661 at the Duxford 90th anniversary show 2008

United Kingdom

- Fleet Air Arm
  - 713 Naval Air Squadron (713 NAS)
  - 759 Naval Air Squadron (759 NAS)
  - 780 Naval Air Squadron (780 NAS)
  - 781 Naval Air Squadron (781 NAS)
  - 800 Naval Air Squadron (800 NAS)
  - 801 Naval Air Squadron (801 NAS)
  - 802 Naval Air Squadron (802 NAS)
  - 803 Naval Air Squadron (803 NAS)
  - No. 404 (Fleet Fighter) Flight FAA (404 Flt)
  - No. 408 (Fleet Fighter) Flight FAA (408 Flt)
  - No. 1 Flying Training School RAF (1 FTS)

== Surviving aircraft ==
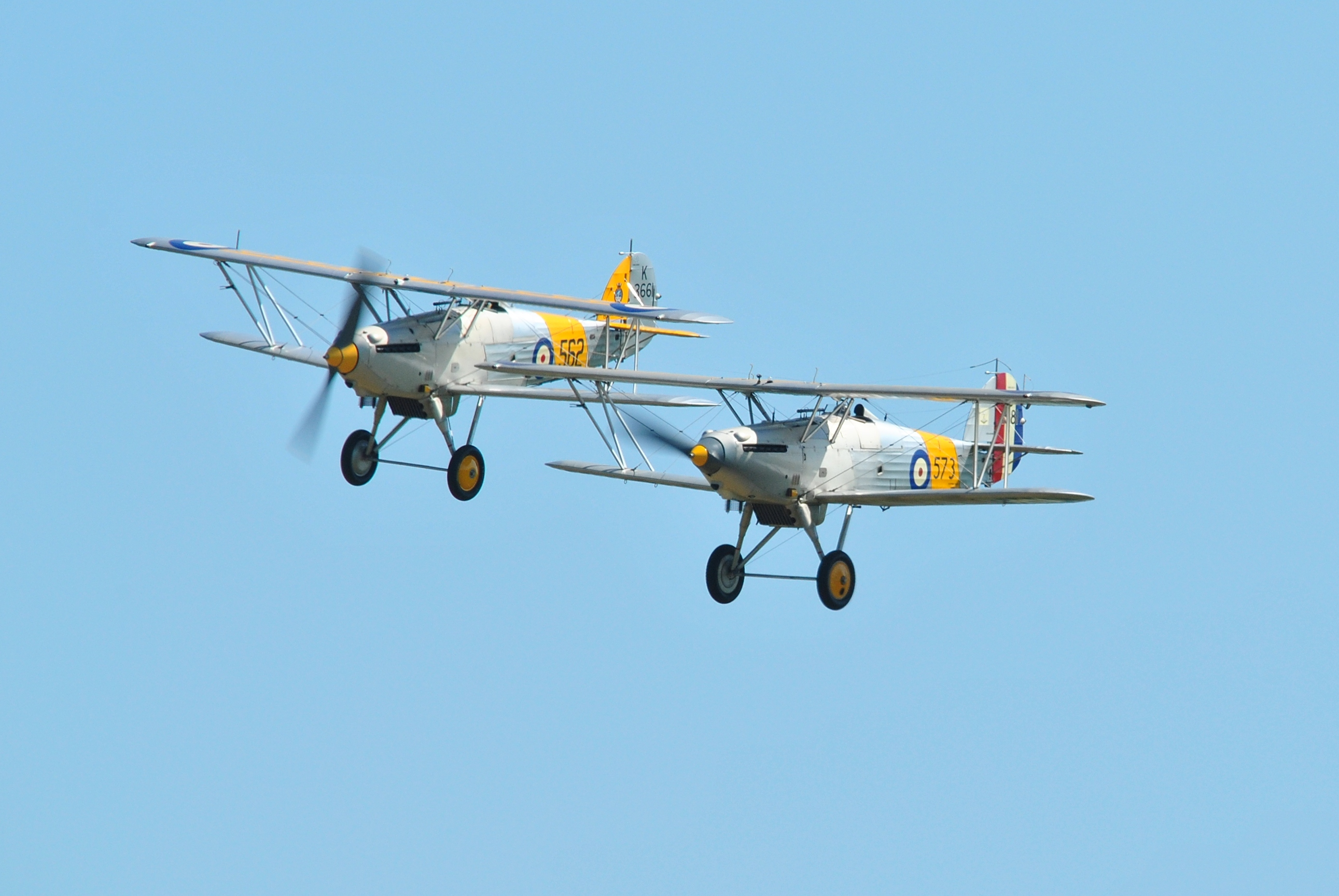
The two surviving Hawker Nimrods in flight in 2021

Two Nimrods survive, both of which are airworthy and are based at the Imperial War Museum's Duxford Aerodrome, Cambridgeshire. Both served with No. 802 Squadron.

=== Nimrod I ===
S1581, G-BWWK is operated by The Fighter Collection. It is the fourth production Mk. I, dating from late 1931 and from the first batch built.

=== Nimrod II ===
K3661, G-BURZ is operated by the Historic Aircraft Collection. It is the penultimate FAA Nimrod, built in early 1934.

== Specifications (Nimrod Mk I) ==
Data from Jane's Vintage Aircraft Recognition Guide

General characteristics

- Crew: 1
- Length: 26 ft 6 in (8.08 m)
- Wingspan: 33 ft 7 in (10.24 m)
- Height: 9 ft 10 in (3.00 m)
- Wing area: 300 sq ft (28 m^{2})
- Airfoil: RAF 28
- Empty weight: 3,110 lb (1,411 kg)
- Max takeoff weight: 4,050 lb (1,837 kg)
- Powerplant: 1 × Rolls-Royce Kestrel VFP V-12 liquid-cooled piston engine, 525 hp (391 kW)
- Propellers: 2-bladed fixed-pitch propeller

Performance

- Maximum speed: 194 mph (312 km/h, 169 kn)
- Range: 305 mi (491 km, 265 nmi)
- Service ceiling: 28,000 ft (8,500 m)

Armament

- Guns: 2 × forward firing fixed .303 in (7.7 mm) machine guns
- Bombs: 4 × 20 lb (9 kg) bombs on underwing racks

== See also ==
Related development

- Hawker Fury
