= Armstrong Whitworth Atlas =

British biplane

Atlas
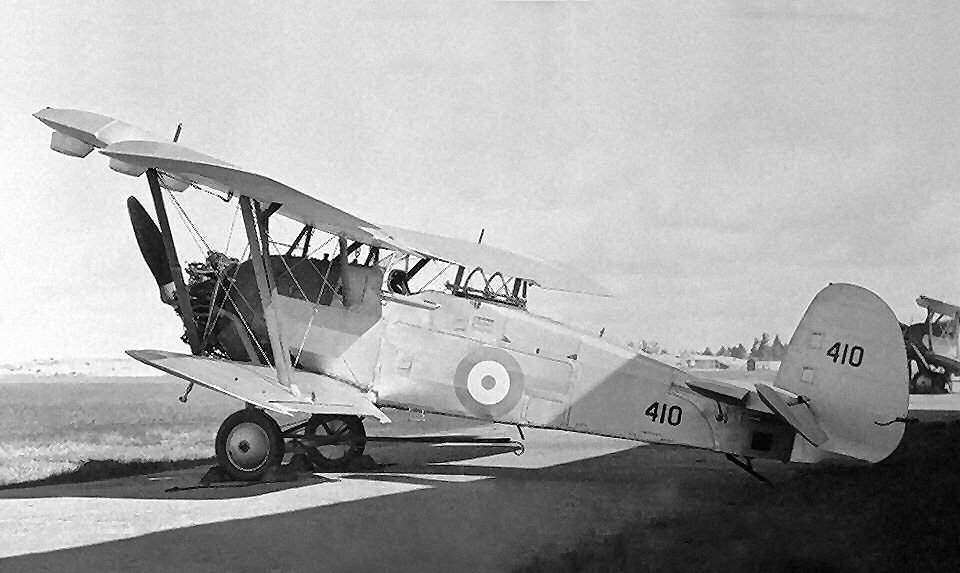

General information
- Type: Army cooperation aircraft
- Manufacturer: Armstrong Whitworth
- Primary users: Royal Air Force Royal Canadian Air Force
- Number built: 478

History
- Manufactured: 1927 - 1933
- Introduction date: 1927
- First flight: 10 May 1925
- Retired: 1935 (RAF), 1942 (RCAF)

The Armstrong Whitworth Atlas was a British single-engine biplane designed and built by Armstrong Whitworth Aircraft. It served as an army co-operation aircraft for the Royal Air Force (RAF) in the 1920s and 1930s. It was the first purpose-designed aircraft of the army co-operation type to serve with the RAF.

== Development ==
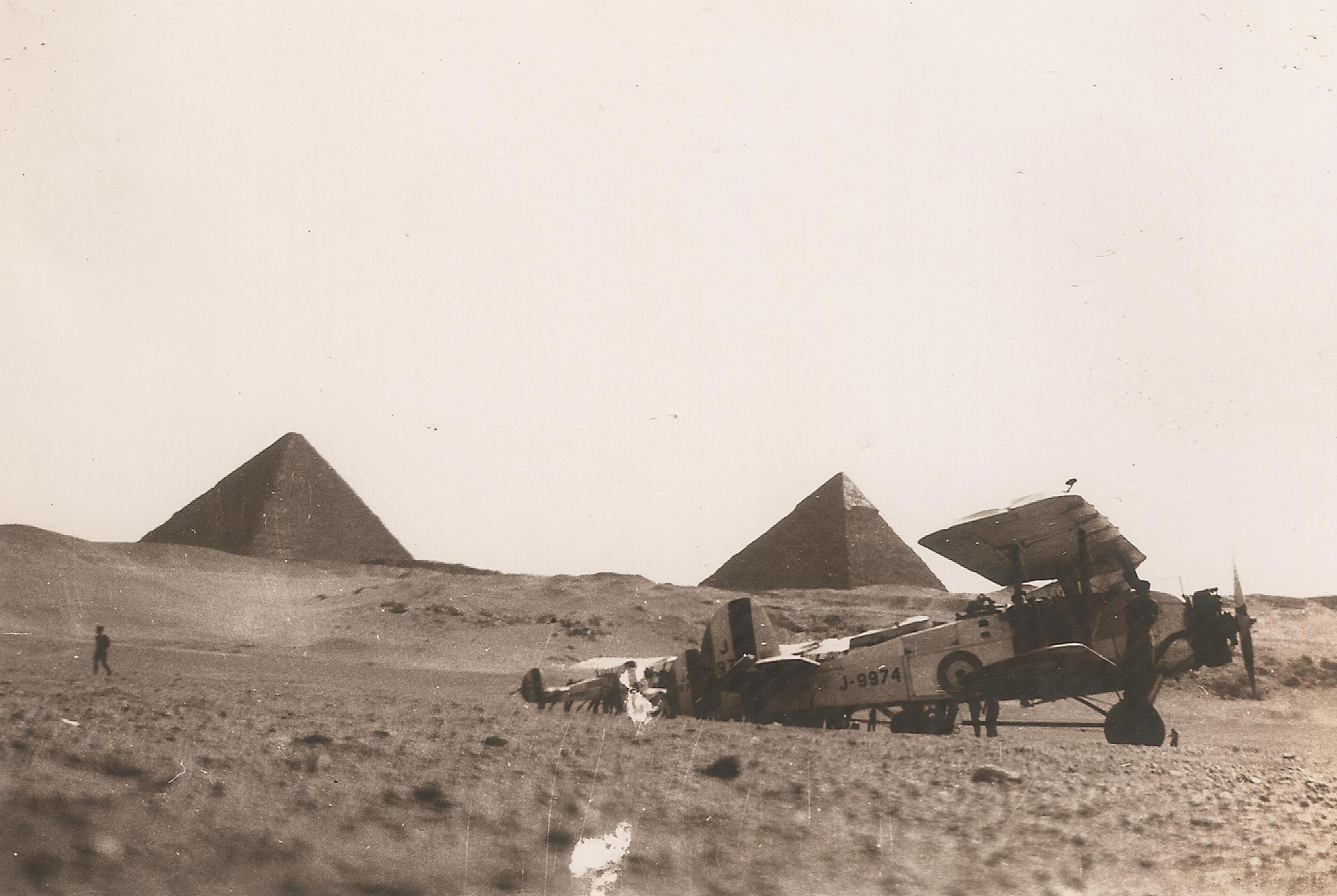
Armstrong Whitworth Atlas of 208 Squadron RAF in Egypt, circa 1932

The Armstrong Whitworth Atlas was designed by a team led by John Lloyd, chief designer of Armstrong Whitworth Aircraft, as a private venture, to replace the DH.9A and Bristol Fighter as an army co-operation aircraft for the RAF, in parallel with a very closely related design, the Armstrong Whitworth Ajax, intended for more general purpose roles. While the two types were private ventures, relevant Air Ministry requirements included Specification 8/24, 30/24 and 20/25.

The prototype Atlas (G-EBLK) was built as a private venture, first flying on 10 May 1925. It was delivered to the Aeroplane and Armament Experimental Establishment (A & AEE), Martlesham Heath, where it was evaluated against the Bristol Boarhound, de Havilland Hyena, Vickers Vespa, and Short Chamois. It proved superior in performance and handling and was recommended for production.

While the performance was generally good, the prototype could not be sideslipped steeply, and this resulted in a redesign where sweptback metal wings, with differing wing section, were fitted. When tested again, the Atlas was found to have lost its good handling, having dangerous stall characteristics. The Atlas had already been ordered for service, however, and suffered a number of accidents during takeoff and landing in the first few months of operation until modified with automatic slats and increased sweepback. This cured the poor handling. The production Atlas had a steel tube fuselage with fabric covering with single-bay swept metal wings. It could be fitted with a hook under the fuselage to pick up messages and could carry a 460 lb (210 kg) bombload under the wings.

== Operational history ==
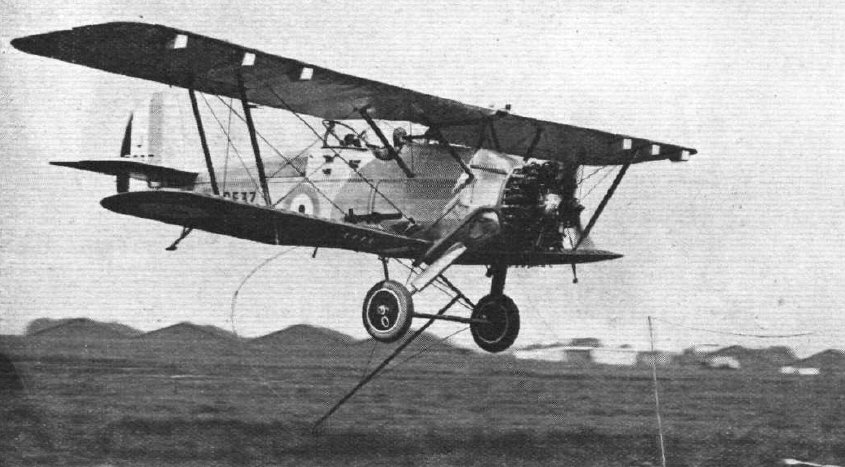
Atlas picking up a message

The first batch of 37 aircraft were ordered in 1927, entering service with 13 Squadron RAF and 26 Squadron in that year. Once the initial handling problems had been solved by the fitting of slats, the Atlas proved well suited for army co-operation, in use at home and overseas, with 208 squadron, being the first squadron to operate Atlases outside Britain, replacing Bristol fighters at Heliopolis, Egypt in 1930. Atlases were also used for communications duties and as advanced trainers, with 175 dual-control models built. The Atlas continued in service in the army co-operations role until replaced with the Hawker Audax, a variant of the Hawker Hart, with the last operational squadron, 208, re-equipping in 1935. It was also replaced in the advanced trainer role in 1935 by the Hawker Hart Trainer.

Four civil registered Atlas trainers were used by Air Service Training Ltd for advanced and reserve flying training. They were scrapped in 1938.

The Royal Canadian Air Force were supplied with 16 aircraft in 1927, mostly serving with No.2 (Army Co-operation) Squadron. They were still in service at the outbreak of World War II in 1939, taking on a new role flying maritime reconnaissance patrols from both Halifax and Saint John over the Bay of Fundy. At the end of 1939 the Atlas aircraft were passed on to No.118 (Coast Artillery Co-operation) Squadron, who continued operating this type on coastal patrols until replaced by Westland Lysander and Blackburn Sharks in 1940.

== Variants ==
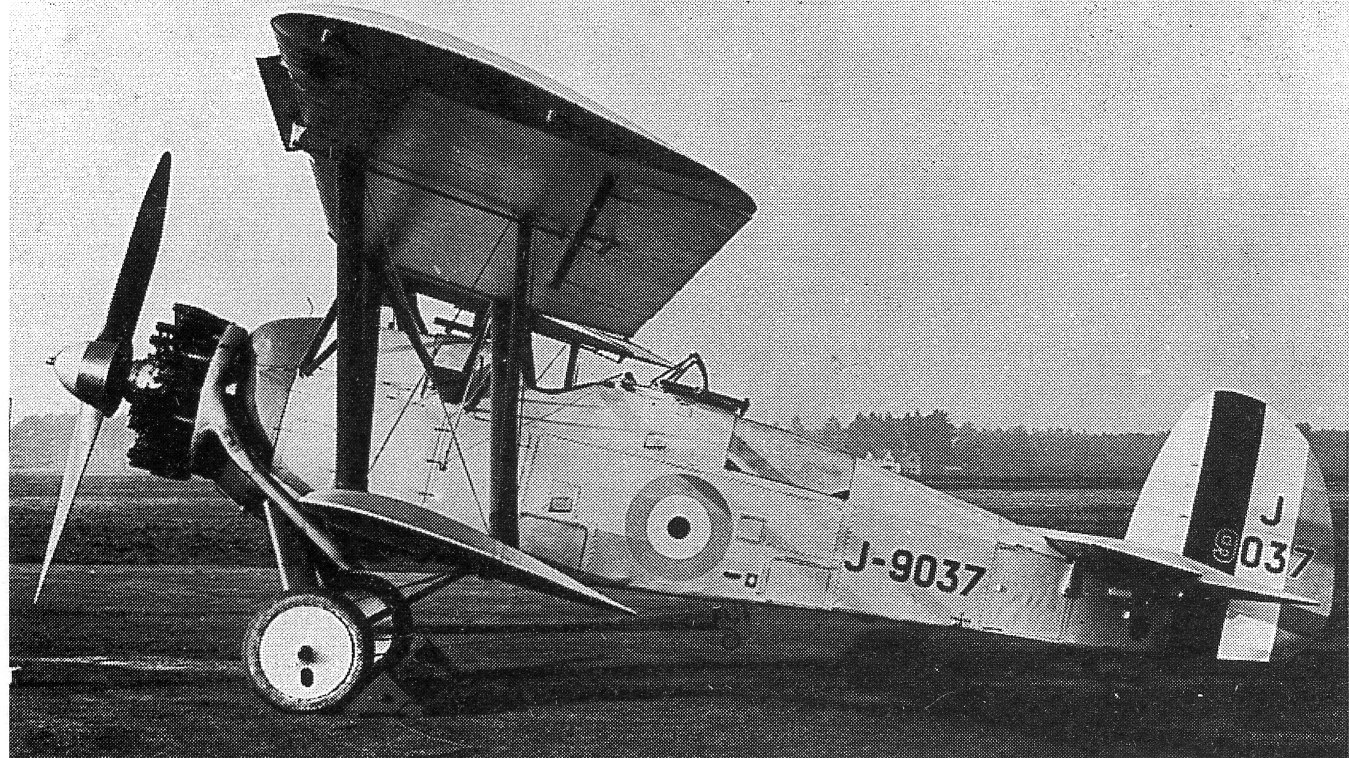
Armstrong Whitworth Aries

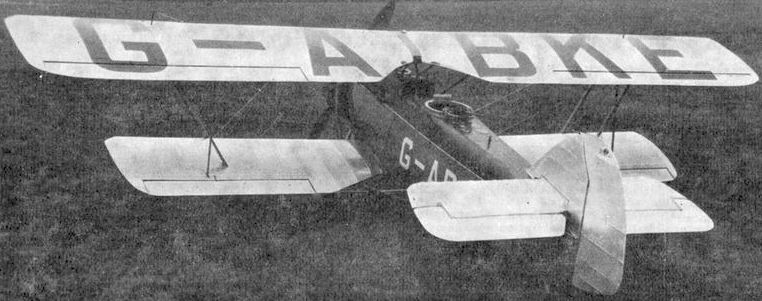
Armstrong Whitworth Atlas II photo from L'Aerophile July 1932

- Atlas I Army co-operation aircraft - 271 built for the RAF.
- Atlas Trainer Dual-control trainer version of Atlas I - 175 built.
- Atlas II Cleaned up, more powerful version, powered by 525 hp (391 kW) Armstrong Siddeley Panther. Rejected in favour of Audax by RAF. 15 built for Kwangsi Air Force, China.
- Ajax minor differences from Atlas I - 4 built for RAF.
- Aries improved Atlas I with easier access for maintenance and increased dimensions - one built
- EAF Atlas Greek lower-cost version (main differences in wing structure, engine and propeller) - 10 built by EAF (KEA) after 1931.)

== Operators ==
=== Military ===
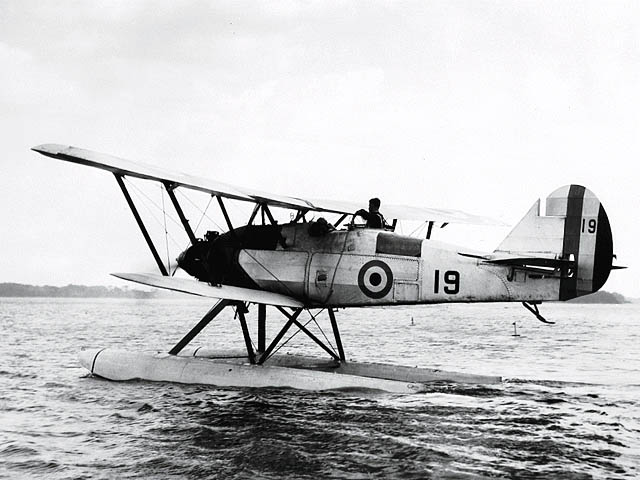
RCAF - Armstrong Whitworth Atlas I, undergoing floatplane trials, 1928

Canada

- Royal Canadian Air Force
  - No. 2 Squadron RCAF
  - No. 111 Squadron RCAF
  - No. 118 Squadron RCAF

China

- Kwangsi Air Force

China

- Chinese Nationalist Air Force

Egypt
Greece

- Hellenic Air Force
- Hellenic Navy

Japan
United Kingdom

- Royal Air Force
  - No. 2 Squadron RAF
  - No. 4 Squadron RAF
  - No 13 Squadron RAF
  - No. 16 Squadron RAF
  - No. 26 Squadron RAF
  - No. 208 Squadron RAF
  - No. 1 Flying Training School RAF
  - No. 3 Flying Training School RAF
  - No. 4 Flying Training School RAF
  - No. 5 Flying Training School RAF
  - RAF College Cranwell

=== Civil ===
United Kingdom

- Air Service Training Ltd.

== Specifications (Atlas I) ==
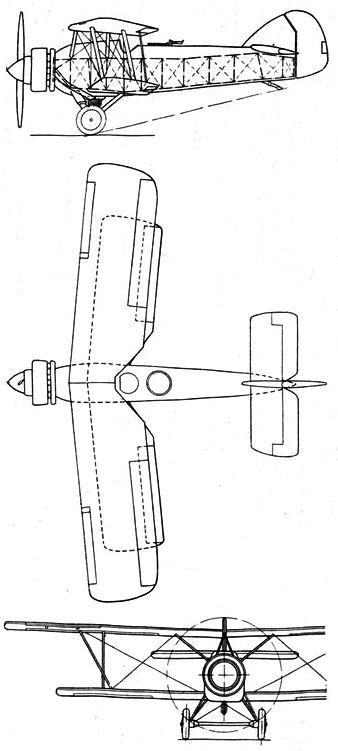
Armstrong Whitworth Atlas II 3-view drawing from L'Aerophile July 1932

Data from The British Bomber since 1914.

General characteristics

- Crew: 2
- Length: 28 ft 6 1/2 in (8.700 m)
- Wingspan: 39 ft 6 1/2 in (12.052 m)
- Height: 10 ft 6 in (3.20 m)
- Wing area: 391 sq ft (36.3 m^{2})
- Airfoil: RAF 28
- Empty weight: 2,550 lb (1,157 kg)
- Max takeoff weight: 4,020 lb (1,823 kg)
- Powerplant: 1 × Armstrong Siddeley Jaguar IVC 14-cylinder two-row air-cooled radial engine, 450 hp (340 kW)

Performance

- Maximum speed: 142 mph (229 km/h, 123 kn) at sea level, 134 mph (216 km/h; 116 kn) at 10,000 ft (3,000 m)
- Range: 400 mi (640 km, 350 nmi)
- Endurance: 3 hr 25 min
- Service ceiling: 16,800 ft (5,100 m)
- Time to altitude: 5 min 30 to 5,000 ft (1,500 m)

Armament

- Guns: 1 × forward firing .303 in (7.7 mm) Vickers machine gun and 1 × .303 in (7.7 mm) Lewis Gun on Scarff ring in rear cockpit
- Bombs: Up to 4 × 112 lb (51 kg) bombs under wings

== See also ==
Related lists

- List of aircraft of the RAF
- List of aircraft of the Canadian Air Force
