= List of Royal Flying Corps squadrons =

A list of Royal Flying Corps squadrons with date and location of foundation.

The Royal Flying Corps (RFC) was the aviation arm of the British Army. Squadrons were the main form of flying unit from its foundation on 13 April 1912, until its merging with the Royal Naval Air Service (RNAS) to form the Royal Air Force on 1 April 1918.

In June 1914, the RFC consisted of five aircraft squadrons; No. 2, 3, 4, 5 and 6. No. 1 Squadron was in the process of converting from balloons, while No. 7 was still being formed. On the outbreak of the First World War on 4 August 1914, the Military Wing of the RFC comprised 147 officers and 1,097 men with 179 aircraft. During the war the RFC underwent a rapid expansion, and by the end of 1916 had 46,000 personnel, and 2,712 aircraft in 64 operational and 33 reserve squadrons. A year later there were 10,938 aircraft in 115 operational and 109 training squadrons.

== Squadrons ==
Name	Date	Location	Ref.	Notes
No. 1 Squadron	13 May 1912	Woolwich		To the RAF on 1 April 1918, based at Ste-Marie-Cappell, France
No. 2 Squadron	13 May 1912	Farnborough		To the RAF on 1 April 1918, based at Merville, France
No. 3 Squadron	13 May 1912	Larkhill		To the RAF on 1 April 1918, based at Valheureux, France
No. 4 Squadron	16 September 1912	Farnborough		To the RAF on 1 April 1918, based at Chocques, France
No. 5 Squadron	26 July 1913	Farnborough		To the RAF on 1 April 1918, based at Acq, France
No. 6 Squadron	31 January 1914	Farnborough		To the RAF on 1 April 1918, based at Le Crotoy, France
No. 7 Squadron	1 May 1914	Farnborough		To the RAF on 1 April 1918, based at Proven, Belgium
No. 8 Squadron	1 January 1915	Brooklands		To the RAF on 1 April 1918, based at Vert Galand, France
No. 9 Squadron	8 December 1914	Saint-Omer		Disbanded on 22 March 1915 and reformed at Brooklands on 1 April 1915. To the RAF on 1 April 1918, based at Proven, Belgium
No. 10 Squadron	1 January 1915	Farnborough		To the RAF on 1 April 1918, based at Chocques, France
No. 11 Squadron	14 February 1915	Netheravon		To the RAF on 1 April 1918, based at Fienvillers, France
No. 12 Squadron	14 February 1915	Netheravon		To the RAF on 1 April 1918, based at Soncamp, France
No. 13 Squadron	10 January 1915	Gosport		To the RAF on 1 April 1918, based at Le Hameau, France
No. 14 Squadron	3 February 1915	Shoreham		from No. 3 Reserve Aeroplane Squadron To the RAF on 1 April 1918, based at Junction Station, Palestine
No. 15 Squadron	1 March 1915	Farnborough		To the RAF on 1 April 1918, based at Fienvillers, France
No. 16 Squadron	10 February 1915	Saint-Omer		To the RAF on 1 April 1918, based at Camblain-l'Abbe, France
No. 17 Squadron	1 February 1915	Gosport		To the RAF on 1 April 1918, based at Lahana, Greece
No. 18 Squadron	11 May 1915	Northolt		To the RAF on 1 April 1918, based at Triezennes, France
No. 19 Squadron	1 September 1915	Castle Bromwich		To the RAF on 1 April 1918, based at Savy, France
No. 20 Squadron	1 September 1915	Netheravon		To the RAF on 1 April 1918, based at Ste-Marie-Cappel, France
No. 21 Squadron	23 July 1915	Netheravon		To the RAF on 1 April 1918, based at Droglandt, France
No. 22 Squadron	1 September 1915	Fort Grange, Gosport		To the RAF on 1 April 1918, based at Vert Galand, France
No. 23 Squadron	1 September 1915	Fort Grange, Gosport		To the RAF on 1 April 1918, based at St-Omer, France
No. 24 Squadron	1 September 1915	Hounslow Heath		To the RAF on 1 April 1918, based at Conteville, France
No. 25 Squadron	25 September 1915	Montrose		To the RAF on 1 April 1918, based at Ruisseauville, France
No. 26 Squadron	8 October 1915	Netheravon		To the RAF on 1 April 1918, based at Cape Town, South Africa
No. 27 Squadron	5 November 1915	Hounslow Heath		To the RAF on 1 April 1918, based at Ruisseauville, France
No. 28 Squadron	7 November 1915	Gosport		To the RAF on 1 April 1918, based at Grossa
No. 29 Squadron	7 November 1915	Gosport		To the RAF on 1 April 1918, based at La Lovie
No. 30 Squadron	24 March 1915	Ismailia, Egypt		To the RAF on 1 April 1918, based at Qubba
No. 31 Squadron	11 October 1915	Farnborough		To the RAF on 1 April 1918, based at Risalpur
No. 32 Squadron	12 January 1916	Netheravon		To the RAF on 1 April 1918, based at Beauvois
No. 33 Squadron	12 January 1916	Filton		To the RAF on 1 April 1918, based at Gainsborough
No. 34 Squadron	7 January 1916	Castle Bromwich		To the RAF on 1 April 1918, based at Villaverla
No. 35 Squadron	1 February 1916	Thetford		To the RAF on 1 April 1918, based at Abbeville
No. 36 Squadron	18 March 1916	Cramlington		To the RAF on 1 April 1918, based at Newcastle
No. 37 Squadron	15 April 1916	Stowe Maries		To the RAF on 1 April 1918, based at Woodham Mortimer
No. 38 Squadron	1 April 1916	Thetford		To the RAF on 1 April 1918, based at Melton Mowbray
No. 39 Squadron	15 April 1916	Hounslow Heath		To the RAF on 1 April 1918, based at North Weald
No. 40 Squadron	26 February 1916	Gosport		To the RAF on 1 April 1918, based at Bruay
No. 41 Squadron	14 July 1916	Gosport		To the RAF on 1 April 1918, based at Alquines
No. 42 Squadron	1 April 1916	Filton		To the RAF on 1 April 1918, based at Chocques
No. 43 Squadron	15 April 1916	Stirling		To the RAF on 1 April 1918, based at Avesne-le-Comte
No. 44 Squadron	24 July 1917	Hainault Farm		Disbanded on 22 May 1916 when it was re-designated No. 26 Reserve Squadron. Reformed 25 July 1917 at Hainault Farm, to RAF on 1 April 1918.
No. 45 Squadron	1 March 1916	Gosport		To the RAF on 1 April 1918, based at Grossa
No. 46 Squadron	19 April 1916	Wyton		To the RAF on 1 April 1918, based at Filescamp Farm, Farm
No. 47 Squadron	1 March 1916	Beverley		To the RAF on 1 April 1918, based at Yanesh, Greece
No. 48 Squadron	15 April 1916	Netheravon		To the RAF on 1 April 1918, based at Conteville, France
No. 49 Squadron	15 April 1916	Dover		To the RAF on 1 April 1918, based at Petite Synth, France
No. 50 Squadron	15 May 1916	Dover		To the RAF on 1 April 1918, based at Bekesbourne
No. 51 Squadron	15 May 1916	Thetford		To the RAF on 1 April 1918, based at Marham
No. 52 Squadron	15 May 1916	Hounslow Heath		To the RAF on 1 April 1918, based at Abbeville, France
No. 53 Squadron	15 May 1916	Catterick		To the RAF on 1 April 1918, based at Boisdinghem, France
No. 54 Squadron	5 May 1916	Castle Bromwich		To the RAF on 1 April 1918, based at Conteville, France
No. 55 Squadron	27 April 1916	Castle Bromwich		To the RAF on 1 April 1918, based at Tantoville, France
No. 56 Squadron	8 June 1916	Gosport		To the RAF on 1 April 1918, based at Valheureux, France
No. 57 Squadron	8 June 1916	Copmanthorpe		To the RAF on 1 April 1918, based at Le Quesnoy, France
No. 58 Squadron	10 January 1916	Cramlington		To the RAF on 1 April 1918, based at Auchel, France
No. 59 Squadron	1 August 1916	Narborough		To the RAF on 1 April 1918, based at Fienvillers, France
No. 60 Squadron	30 April 1916	Gosport		To the RAF on 1 April 1918, based at Fienvillers, France
No. 61 Squadron	2 August 1917	Rochford		Disbanded on 24 August 1916 when it absorbed into No. 63 Squadron. Reformed on 24 July 1917 at Rochford, to the RAF on 1 April 1918
No. 62 Squadron	8 August 1916	Filton		To the RAF on 1 April 1918, based at Planques, France
No. 63 Squadron	31 August 1916	Stirling		To the RAF on 1 April 1918, based at Samarra
No. 64 Squadron	1 August 1916	Sedgeford		To the RAF on 1 April 1918, based at Le Hameau, France
No. 65 Squadron	1 August 1916	Wyton		To the RAF on 1 April 1918, based at Conteville
No. 66 Squadron	30 June 1916	Filton		To the RAF on 1 April 1918, based at San Pietro-in-Gu
No. 67 Squadron	January 1916	Point Cook, Australia		Later No. 1 Squadron, Australian Flying Corps in February 1918
No. 68 Squadron	20 September 1916	Kantara, Egypt		Later No. 2 Squadron, Australian Flying Corps in February 1918
No. 69 Squadron	19 September 1916	Point Cook		Later No. 3 Squadron, Australian Flying Corps January 1918
No. 70 Squadron	22 April 1916	South Farnborough		To the RAF on 1 April 1918, based at Fienvillers
No. 71 Squadron	16 October 1916	Point Cook		Later No. 4 Squadron, Australian Flying Corps in January 1918
No. 72 Squadron	2 July 1917	Netheravon		To the RAF on 1 April 1918, based at Basra
No. 73 Squadron	1 July 1917	Upavon		To the RAF on 1 April 1918, based at Beauvois
No. 74 Squadron	1 July 1917	London Colney		To the RAF on 1 April 1918, based at St-Omer
No. 75 Squadron	1 October 1916	Goldington		To the RAF on 1 April 1918, based at Elmswell
No. 76 Squadron	15 September 1916	Ripon		To the RAF on 1 April 1918, based at Ripon
No. 77 Squadron	1 October 1916	Turnhouse		To the RAF on 1 April 1918, based at Edinburgh
No. 78 Squadron	1 November 1916	Newhaven		To the RAF on 1 April 1918, based at Sutton's Farm
No. 79 Squadron	1 August 1917	Gosport		To the RAF on 1 April 1918, based at Beauvois
No. 80 Squadron	1 August 1917	Montrose		To the RAF on 1 April 1918, based at Belleville Farm
No. 81 Squadron	7 January 1917	Gosport		To the RAF on 1 April 1918, based at Scampton
No. 82 Squadron	7 January 1917	Doncaster		To the RAF on 1 April 1918, based at Agenvillers
No. 83 Squadron	7 January 1917	Montrose		To the RAF on 1 April 1918, based at Auchel
No. 84 Squadron	January 1917	Beaulieu		To the RAF on 1 April 1918, based at Conteville
No. 85 Squadron	1 August 1917	Upavon		To the RAF on 1 April 1918, based at Hounslow
No. 86 Squadron	1 September 1917	Shoreham		To the RAF on 1 April 1918, based at Northolt
No. 87 Squadron	1 September 1917	Upavon		To the RAF on 1 April 1918, based at Hounslow
No. 88 Squadron	24 July 1917	Gosport		To the RAF on 1 April 1918, based at Harling Road
No. 89 Squadron	1 September 1917	Catterick		To the RAF on 1 April 1918, based at Harling Road
No. 90 Squadron	8 October 1917	Shawbury		To the RAF on 1 April 1918, based at Shotwick
No. 91 Squadron	1 September 1917	Grantham		To the RAF on 1 April 1918, based at Tangmere
No. 92 Squadron	1 September 1917	London Colney		To the RAF on 1 April 1918, based at Tangmere
No. 93 Squadron	1 September 1917	Croydon		To the RAF on 1 April 1918, based at Tangmere
No. 94 Squadron	1 August 1917	Harling Road		To the RAF on 1 April 1918, based at Harling Road
No. 95 Squadron	8 October 1917	Ternhill		To the RAF on 1 April 1918, based at Shotwick
No. 96 Squadron	8 October 1917	South Carlton		To the RAF on 1 April 1918, based at Shotwick
No. 97 Squadron	1 December 1917	Waddington		To the RAF on 1 April 1918, based at Netheravon
No. 98 Squadron	30 August 1917	Harlaxton		To the RAF on 1 April 1918, based at St Omer
No. 99 Squadron	15 August 1917	Yatesbury		To the RAF on 1 April 1918, based at Ford Farm
No. 100 Squadron	23 February 1917	Hingham		To the RAF on 1 April 1918, based at Ochey
No. 101 Squadron	12 July 1917	South Farnborough		To the RAF on 1 April 1918, based at Haute Vissee, France
No. 102 Squadron	August 1917	Hingham		To the RAF on 1 April 1918, based at Le Hameau, France
No. 103 Squadron	1 September 1917	Beaulieu		To the RAF on 1 April 1918, based at Old Sarum
No. 104 Squadron	4 September 1917	Wyton		To the RAF on 1 April 1918, based at Andover
No. 105 Squadron	September 1917	Andover		To the RAF on 1 April 1918, based at Andover
No. 106 Squadron	30 September 1917	Andover		To the RAF on 1 April 1918, based at Andover
No. 107 Squadron	15 May 1918	Lake Down, Wiltshire		To the RAF on 1 April 1918, based at Lake Down
No. 108 Squadron	11 November 1917	Stonehenge, Wiltshire		To the RAF on 1 April 1918, based at Lake Down
No. 109 Squadron	1 November 1917	South Carlton		To the RAF on 1 April 1918, based at Lake Down
No. 110 Squadron	1 November 1917	Rendcomb		To the RAF on 1 April 1918, based at Sedgeford
No. 111 Squadron	1 August 1917	Deir al-Balah, Palestine		To the RAF on 1 April 1918, based at Ramleh, Palestine
No. 112 Squadron	30 July 1917	Detling		To the RAF on 1 April 1918, based at Throwley
No. 113 Squadron	1 August 1917	Ismailia, Egypt		To the RAF on 1 April 1918, based at Sarona, Palestine
No. 114 Squadron	September 1917	Lahore, India		To the RAF on 1 April 1918
No. 115 Squadron	1 December 1917	Catterick		To the RAF on 1 April 1918
No. 116 Squadron	1 December 1917	Andover		To the RAF on 1 April 1918, based at Netheravon
No. 117 Squadron	1 January 1918	Waddington		To the RAF on 1 April 1918
No. 118 Squadron	1 January 1918	Catterick		To the RAF on 1 April 1918
No. 119 Squadron	1 January 1918	Andover		To the RAF on 1 April 1918, based at Duxford
No. 120 Squadron	1 January 1918	Cramlington		To the RAF on 1 April 1918
No. 121 Squadron	1 January 1918	Narborough		To the RAF on 1 April 1918
No. 122 Squadron	1 January 1918	Sedgeford		To the RAF on 1 April 1918
No. 123 Squadron	1 February 1918	Waddington		To the RAF on 1 April 1918, based at Duxford
No. 124 Squadron	March 1918	Old Sarum		To the RAF on 1 April 1918, based at Fowlmere
No. 125 Squadron	1 February 1918	Old Sarum		To the RAF on 1 April 1918, based at Fowlmere
No. 126 Squadron	1 February 1918	Old Sarum		To the RAF on 1 April 1918, based at Fowlmere
No. 127 Squadron	1 February 1918	Catterick		To the RAF on 1 April 1918
No. 128 Squadron	1 February 1918	Thetford		To the RAF on 1 April 1918
No. 129 Squadron	1 March 1918	Duxford		To the RAF on 1 April 1918
No. 130 Squadron	1 March 1918	Wyton		To the RAF on 1 April 1918, based at Hucknall
No. 131 Squadron	1 March 1918	Shawbury		To the RAF on 1 April 1918
No. 132 Squadron	1 March 1918	Ternhill		To the RAF on 1 April 1918
No. 133 Squadron	1 March 1918	Ternhill		To the RAF on 1 April 1918
No. 134 Squadron	1 March 1918	Ternhill		To the RAF on 1 April 1918
No. 141 Squadron	1 January 1918	Rochford		To the RAF on 1 April 1918
No. 142 Squadron	2 February 1918	Ismailia, Egypt		To the RAF on 1 April 1918, based at Julis
No. 143 Squadron	1 February 1918	Throwley		To the RAF on 1 April 1918, based at Detling
No. 144 Squadron	20 March 1918	Port Said, Egypt		To the RAF on 1 April 1918
No. 148 Squadron	10 February 1918	Andover		To the RAF on 1 April 1918, based at Ford Junction
No. 149 Squadron	3 March 1918	Yapton		To the RAF on 1 April 1918, based at Ford Junction

=== Reserve/Training Squadrons ===
Originally named Reserve Aeroplane Squadrons when formed, these were renamed to Reserve Squadrons on 13 January 1916, and then again to Training Squadrons on 31 May 1917 for the RFC or a little later for Royal Flying Corps Canada units.

NB: This number sequence was not linked to the operational squadrons; No. 1 Squadron RFC is not the same unit as No. 1 Training Squadron RFC.

Name	Date	Location	Ref.	Notes
Reserve Aeroplane Squadron	August 1914	Farnborough		
No. 1 Training Squadron	12 November 1914	Farnborough		Originally Reserve Aeroplane Squadron, then No. 1 RAS
No. 2 Training Squadron	12 November 1914	Brooklands		
No. 3 Training Squadron	21 January 1915	Netheravon		Originally No. 3 Reserve Aeroplane Squadron
No. 4 Training Squadron	29 January 1915	Farnborough		
No. 5 Training Squadron	11 May 1915	Castle Bromwich		
No. 6 Training Squadron	17 July 1915	Montrose		
No. 7 Training Squadron	28 July 1915	Netheravon		
No. 8 Training Squadron	28 July 1915	Netheravon		
No. 9 Training Squadron	27 July 1915	Norwich		
No. 10 Training Squadron	1 September 1915	Joyce Green		Formed from a detachment of No. 2 Reserve Aeroplane Squadron
No. 11 Training Squadron	12 October 1915	Northolt		Formed out of No. 4 Reserve Aeroplane Squadron
No. 12 Training Squadron	15 November 1915	Dover		
No. 13 Training Squadron	27 November 1915	Dover		
No. 14 Training Squadron	1 December 1915	Catterick		
No. 15 Training Squadron	15 December 1915	Thetford		
No. 16 Training Squadron	15 December 1915	Beaulieu		
No. 17 Training Squadron	25 December 1915	Croydon		
No. 18 Training Squadron	1 January 1916	Montrose		
No. 19 Training Squadron	29 January 1916	Hounslow		Became 39 (Home Defence) Sqn RFC
No. 20 Training Squadron	1 February 1916	Dover		
No. 21 Training Squadron	22 May 1916	Shoreham		
No. 22 Training Squadron	24 August 1916	Aboukir		
No. 23 Training Squadron	24 August 1916	Aboukir		
No. 24 Training Squadron	25 May 1916	Netheravon		
No. 25 Training Squadron	22 May 1916	Thetford		
No. 26 Training Squadron	22 May 1916	Turnhouse		
No. 27 Training Squadron	22 May 1916	Gosport		
No. 28 Training Squadron	1 June 1916	Castle Bromwich		
No. 29 (Australian) Training Squadron	15 June 1917	Shawbury		Later No. 5 Training Squadron, Australian Flying Corps
No. 30 (Australian) Training Squadron	15 June 1917	Parkhouse		Later No. 6 Training Squadron, Australian Flying Corps
No. 31 Training Squadron	1 October 1916	Wyton		
No. 32 (Australian) Training Squadron	24 October 1917	Yatesbury		Later No. 7 Training Squadron, Australian Flying Corps
No. 33 (Australian) Training Squadron	24 October 1917	Wendover		Later No. 8 Training Squadron, Australian Flying Corps
No. 34 Training Squadron	1 November 1916	Castle Bromwich		
No. 35 Training Squadron	1 February 1917	Filton		
No. 36 Training Squadron	5 July 1916	Beverley		
No. 37 Training Squadron	2 November 1916	Catterick		
No. 38 Training Squadron	1 August 1916	Rendcomb		
No. 39 Training Squadron	26 August 1917	Montrose		Disbanded into 46 Training Depot Station
No. 40 Training Squadron	5 July 1916	Northolt		
No. 41 Training Squadron	5 July 1916	Bramham Moor		
No. 42 Training Squadron	2 November 1916	Hounslow		
No. 43 Training Squadron	2 November 1916	Castle Bromwich		
No. 44 Training Squadron	2 November 1916	Lilbourne		
No. 45 Training Squadron	2 November 1916	London Colney		Disbanded into 46 Training Depot Station
No. 46 Training Squadron	23 October 1916	Doncaster		
No. 47 Training Squadron	2 November 1916	Cramlington		
No. 48 Training Squadron	2 November 1916	Narborough		
No. 49 Training Squadron	23 September 1916	Norwich		
No. 50 Training Squadron	7 December 1916	Wye		
No. 51 Training Squadron	30 December 1916	Filton		
No. 52 Training Squadron	14 January 1917	Cramlington		
No. 53 Training Squadron	1 February 1917	Sedgeford		
No. 54 Training Squadron	15 February 1917	Wyton		
No. 55 Training Squadron	15 November 1916	Wyton		
No. 56 Training Squadron	7 February 1917	London Colney		
No. 57 Training Squadron	10 December 1916	Ismalia		Disbanded into 17 Training Depot Station
No. 58 Training Squadron		Farnborough		Moved to Egypt in January 1917
No. 59 Training Squadron	1 February 1917	Gosport		
No. 60 Training Squadron	7 April 1917	Beverley		
No. 61 Training Squadron	1 May 1917	Cramlington		
No. 62 Training Squadron	1 May 1917	Gosport		
No. 63 Training Squadron	28 March 1917	Ternhill		
No. 64 Training Squadron	7 April 1917	Dover		
No. 65 Training Squadron	1 May 1917	Croydon		
No. 66 Training Squadron	1 May 1917	Wye		
No. 67 Training Squadron	3 June 1917	Castle Bromwich		
No. 68 Training Squadron	7 April 1917	Catterick		
No. 69 Training Squadron	1 October 1917	Catterick		
No. 70 Training Squadron	10 December 1917	Netheravon		
No. 71 Training Squadron	28 November 1917	Netheravon		
No. 72 Training Squadron	10 January 1918	Wyton		
No. 73 Training Squadron	7 July 1917	Thetford		
No. 74 Training Squadron	21 October 1917	Netheravon		
No. 75 Training Squadron	14 November 1917	Waddington		
No. 78 (Canadian) Training Squadron	9 February 1917	Beverley		at Camp Borden by March 1917
No. 79 (Canadian) Training Squadron	9 February 1917	Beverley		at Camp Borden by March 1917
No. 80 (Canadian) Training Squadron	January 1917	Doncaster		at Camp Borden by April 1917
No. 81 (Canadian) Training Squadron	9 February 1917	Beaulieu		at Camp Borden by April 1917
No. 82 (Canadian) Training Squadron	9 February 1917	Montrose		at Camp Borden by April 1917
No. 83 (Canadian) Training Squadron	9 February 1917	Catterick		at Deseronto by May 1917
No. 84 (Canadian) Training Squadron	9 February 1917	Turnhouse		at Deseronto by May 1917
No. 85 (Canadian) Training Squadron	9 February 1917	Montrose		at Rathbun by May 1917
No. 86 (Canadian) Training Squadron	9 February 1917	Spitalgate		at Deseronto by May 1917
No. 87 (Canadian) Training Squadron	9 February 1917	Gosport		at Deseronto by May 1917
No. 88 (Canadian) Training Squadron	15 March 1917	Catterick		at Rathbun by May 1917
No. 89 (Canadian) Training Squadron	15 March 1917	Turnhouse		at Armour Heights by July 1917
No. 90 (Canadian) Training Squadron	15 March 1917	Doncaster		at Armour Heights by July 1917
No. 91 (Canadian) Training Squadron	15 March 1917	Gosport		at Armour Heights by July 1917
No. 92 (Canadian) Training Squadron	15 March 1917	Netheravon		at Armour Heights by July 1917
No. 93 (Canadian) Training Squadron	1917	Armour Heights		
No. 94 (Canadian) Training Squadron				(Nameplate set aside but not formed)
No. 95 (Canadian) Training Squadron				(Nameplate set aside but not formed)
No. 96 (Canadian) Training Squadron				(Nameplate set aside but not formed)
No. 97 (Canadian) Training Squadron				(Nameplate set aside but not formed)
No. 186 (Night) Training Squadron	1 April 1918	Throwley		Formed as part of the Royal Air Force
No. 187 (Night) Training Squadron	1 April 1918	East Retford		Formed as part of the Royal Air Force
No. 188 (Night) Training Squadron	20 December 1917	Throwley		
No. 189 (Night) Training Squadron	20 December 1917	Ripon		
No. 190 (Night) Training Squadron	24 October 1917	Rochford		Formed as No. 190 Depot Squadron
No. 191 (Night) Training Squadron	6 November 1917	Marham		Formed as No. 191 Depot Squadron
No. 192 (Night) Training Squadron	5 September 1917	Gainsborough		Formed as No. 192 Depot Squadron
No. 193 Training Squadron	9 August 1917	El Amriya, Egypt		Disbanded into No. 20 Training Depot Station
No. 194 Training Squadron	9 August 1917	El Amriya		Disbanded into No. 16 Training Depot Station
No. 195 Training Squadron	9 August 1917	Abu Sueir, Egypt		Disbanded into No. 19 Training Depot Station
No. 196 Training Squadron	9 August 1917	Heliopolis, Egypt		Disbanded into Aerial Flying School
No. 197 Training Squadron	9 August 1917	Almaza, Egypt		Disbanded into Artillery Observation School
No. 198 (Night) Training Squadron	8 February 1917	Rochford		Formed as No. 98 Depot Squadron, later No. 198 Depot Squadron before becoming a night training squadron in December 1917.
No. 199 (Night) Training Squadron	1 June 1917	Rochford		
No. 200 (Night) Training Squadron	1 July 1917	East Retford		
No. 201 Training Squadron	14 August 1918	East Fortune		Formed from the No. 1 Torpedo Training Squadron as part of the Royal Air Force

== Schools ==
Name	Date	Location	Ref.	Notes
Central Flying School	12 May 1912	Upavon		
Flying Training School	November 1915	Beaulieu		
No. 1 Aerial Gunnery School		Ayr		
No. 1 (Auxiliary) School of Gunnery	September 1916	Hythe		Machine Gun School renamed
No. 1 (Observers) School of Aerial Gunnery		Hythe		
No. 1 Balloon School		Rollestone Camp/Larkhill		
No. 1 Fighting School	29 May 1918	Ayr		No. 1 School of Aerial Fighting & Gunnery renamed
No. 1 School of Aerial Fighting	19 September 1917	Ayr		No. 1 Aerial Gunnery School renamed
No. 1 School of Aerial Fighting & Gunnery	10 May 1918	Ayr		No. 1 School of Aerial Fighting renamed
No. 1 School of Military Aeronautics	December 1915	Wantage Hall, Reading		Known as No. 1 School of Instruction until October 1916, when it became No. 1 School of Military Aeronautics
No. 1 School of Special Flying	2 August 1917	Gosport		No. 1 Training Squadron renamed
No. 1 School of Technical Training (Men)	1917	Halton		
No. 1 School of Technical Training (Men)	1915	Coley Park		Detachment until September 1918
No. 1 School of Navigation and Bomb Dropping	1917	Stonehenge Aerodrome		
No. 2 (Auxiliary) School of Aerial Gunnery		Turnberry		
No. 2 Balloon School		Lydd		
No. 2 Fighting School	June 1918	Marske Aerodrome		
No. 2 School of Aerial Fighting		Driffield		
No. 2 School of Military Aeronautics	April 1916	Brasenose College, Oxford		Known as No. 2 School of Instruction until October 1916, when it became No. 2 School of Military Aeronautics
No. 2 School of Navigation and Bomb Dropping	1917	Andover		
No. 2 School of Special Flying		Redcar		
No. 2 Wireless School	8 November 1917	Chiddingstone Causeway		
No. 3 Fighting School		Bircham Newton		
No. 3 School of Aerial Fighting & Gunnery		Driffield		
No. 3 School of Military Aeronautics		Exeter College, Oxford		
No. 3 School of Military Aviation	25 November 1916	Aboukir, Egypt		
No. 4 School of Air Gunnery	December 1917	Marske Aerodrome		
Aerial Flying School	13 November 1917	Heliopolis, Egypt		No. 196 Training Squadron renamed
Armament School	19 November 1917	Uxbridge		
Artillery & Infantry Cooperation School				
Artillery Cooperation School		Leaside Aerodrome		Royal Flying Corps Canada unit
Artillery Observation School	20 November 1917	Almaza, Egypt		No. 197 Training Squadron renamed
Machine Gun School	3 October 1915	Dover		Became the School of Aerial Gunnery in September 1916 at Hythe
Military School		Ruislip		Planned name/use of Northolt airfield
Observer School		Oxford		
Observer School		Reading		
Officers Training School		Reading		
Naval Seaplane Training School	30 July 1917	Lee-on-Solent		
Royal Engineers Balloon School				
School of Aerial Fighting	1918	Marske Aerodrome		
School of Aerial Fighting	1917	Beamsville		Royal Flying Corps Canada unit
School of Aerial Gunnery		Loch Doon		
School of Aerial Gunnery	October 1917	Hicks Field, Texas		Camp Taliaferro
School of Army Co-operation	1918	Worthy Down		
School of Instruction		Reading		
School of Photography Training Brigade				
School of Special Flying		Armour Heights		Royal Flying Corps Canada unit
Wireless and Observers School	24 October 1916	Brooklands		Wireless School renamed
Wireless and Observers School	1917	Worthy Down		
Wireless School	24 August 1916	Brooklands		Wireless Experimental Flight renamed

== See also ==
- List of Royal Air Force aircraft squadrons
