= RAF Manywells Height =

Royal Air Force base in Yorkshire, England

RAF Manywells Height RAF Cullingworth
- Cullingworth, West Yorkshire in England
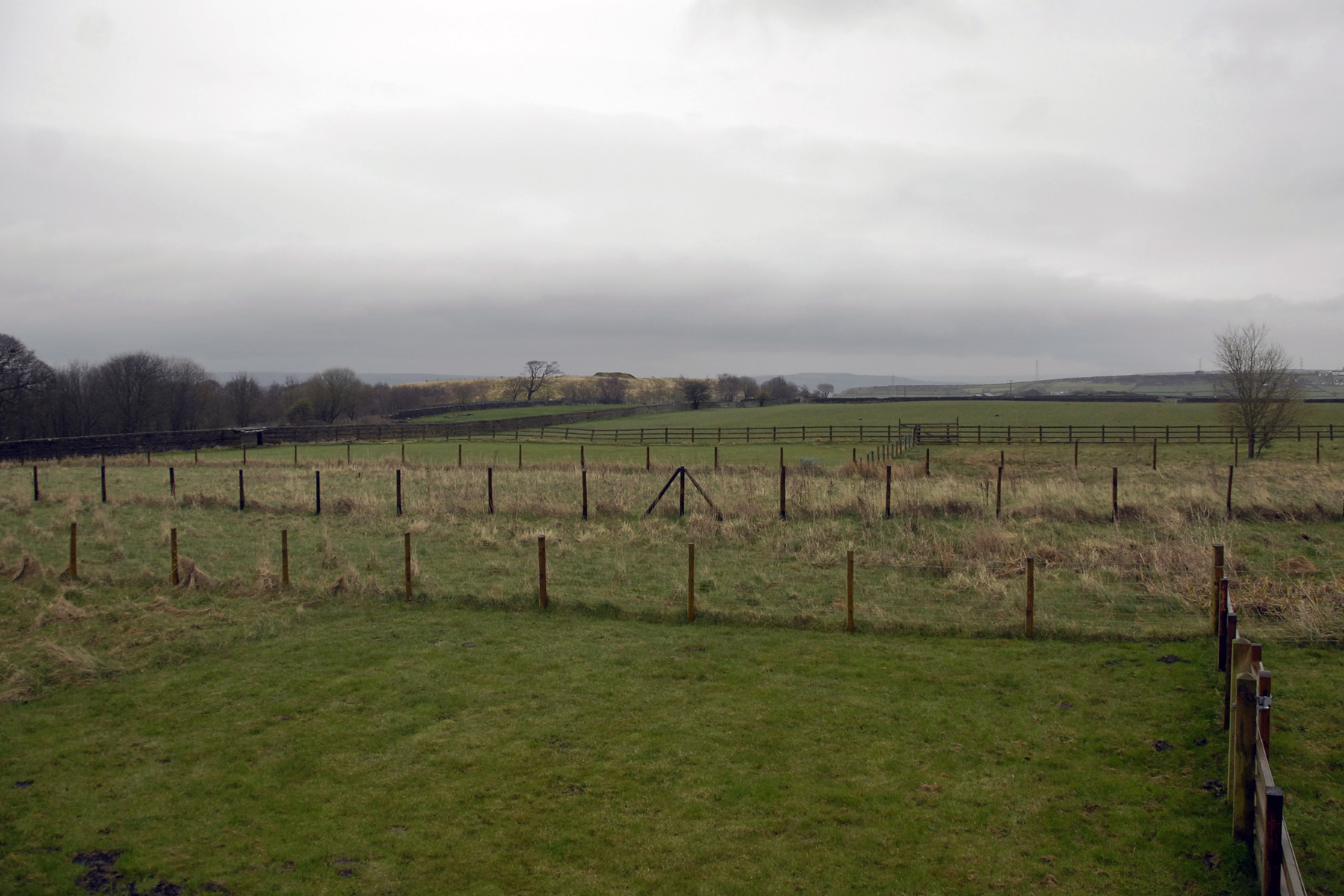
- Looking eastwards across the site of RAF Manywells Height towards the Aire Valley

Site information
- Type: Royal Air Force station
- Owner: Air Ministry
- Operator: Royal Flying Corps; Royal Air Force

Location
- Shown within West Yorkshire RAF Manywells Height (the United Kingdom)
- Coordinates: 53°48′59.2″N 1°54′07.8″W

Site history
- Built: 1916
- In use: 1916 - 1919
- Battles/wars: First World War

Airfield information
- Elevation: 273 metres (896 ft) AMSL
Runways
| Direction | Length and surface |
|---|---|
| 00/00 | Grass |

Royal Air Force Manywells Height (also known as Royal Flying Corps Manywells Height, Royal Flying Corps Cullingworth and Royal Air Force Cullingworth) was a grassed airstrip in use as Home Defence during the First World War. The site was just south of the village of Cullingworth which is south of Keighley and north west of Bradford in West Yorkshire.

It was considered as a civilian airfield for West Yorkshire on decommissioning, but Yeadon became the hub of civilian flights as Leeds Bradford International Airport.

It was used by aircraft from 1913 and commissioned as an airfield by the Royal Flying Corps in 1916 with closure by the Royal Air Force (its eventual owner) in 1919. Whilst it was used in 1919 in a civilian capacity, it was abandoned in that same year.

== History ==
On 13 October 1913, Manywells Height was first used as a landing strip when Captain Maclean landed his Royal Aircraft Factory BE2A aeroplane en route to Montrose. Foul weather prevented him from taking off again on the same day and it wasn't until the following Monday (15 October 1913) that he was able to get airborne.

During the First World War, Manywells Height was pressed into service by the Royal Flying Corps as a Relief Landing Ground for two Home Defence Squadrons (33 and 76 Squadrons). The airfield and its environs totalled 40 acres (16 ha) but facilities were basic and ran to just one wooden and canvas hangar with accompanying grassed strip. The whole landing ground covered only 40 acres (16 ha) and the strip itself was 550 yards (500 m) by 420 yards (380 m).

33 and 76 Squadrons were officially billeted at RAF Kirton in Lindsey and RFC Ripon respectively, though detachments and flights were also billeted at Gainsborough and Tadcaster.

The airfield was designated for night operations when combatting German Airships. Aircraft from 33 and 76 Squadrons would have visited occasionally by day to check suitability for operations, but there is no evidence that it was ever used in its intended capacity.

On the formation of the Royal Air Force from the Royal Flying Corps and the Royal Naval Air Service on 1 April 1918, RFC Manywells Height became RAF Manywells Height. It was active until the 26 June 1919 when its use was discontinued by the Royal Air Force.

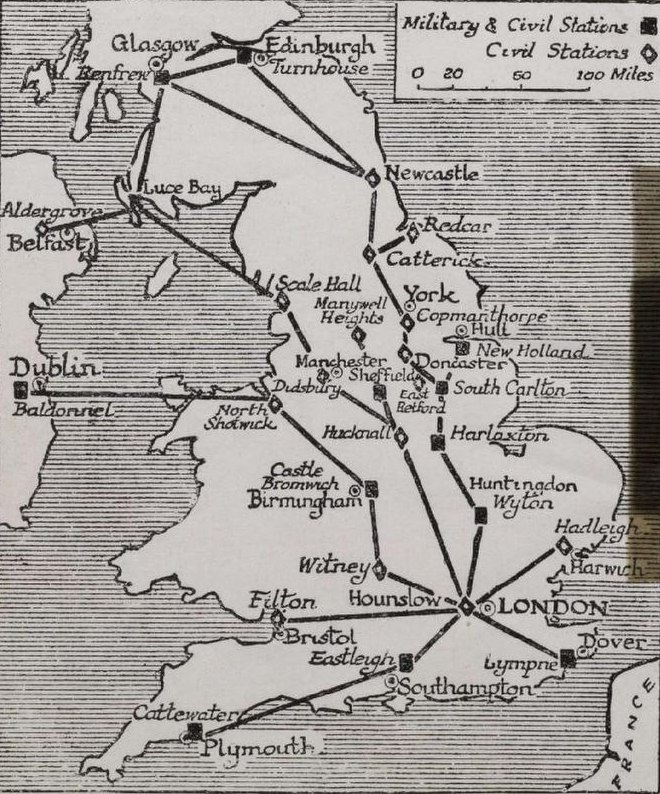
"Map of Air Routes and Landing Places in Great Britain, as temporarily arranged by the Air Ministry for civilian flying", published in 1919, showing "Manywell Heights" as a "civil station".

The strip was on an official Air Ministry notification detailing aerial postal services from Hounslow Aerodrome to Manywells Height via Sheffield.

The site was considered a poor choice for a civilian airport due to the surrounding hilly area, its height above sea level and its often inclement weather. Yeadon was chosen as a suitable site instead despite being only 217 feet (66 m) lower than Manywells Height.

== Current usage ==
The site has been returned to grass and farmland. Its northern edge has been used as part of a landfill site known as Manywells Tip.
