= RAF Helperby =

Former RAF base in Yorkshire, England

RAF Helperby
- RAF Brafferton
- Brafferton, North Yorkshire in England
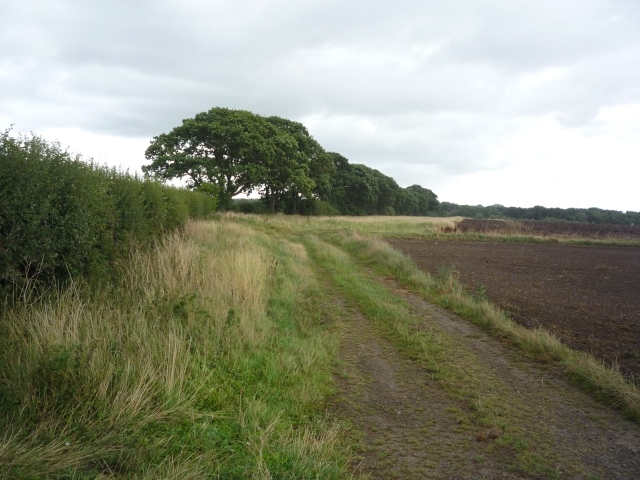
- Looking south east across the bomb store

Site information
- Owner: Air Ministry
- Operator: Royal Air Force

Location
- Coordinates: 54.134°N 1.318°W
- Area: 81 acres (33 ha)

Site history
- In use: 1916–1918; 1939–1947

Garrison information
- Occupants: No. 33 Squadron RAF; No. 76 Squadron RAF; No. 92 MU RAF

RAF Helperby (also known as RAF Brafferton), was a First World War era airfield near to the villages of Brafferton and Helperby in North Yorkshire, England. It was used initially by No. 33 Squadron RAF, and then later by No. 76 Squadron RAF in the home defence (HD) role. During the Second World War, the site was used as an ammunition supply depot, being operated by No. 92 Maintenance Unit RAF, and also by the USAAF. The site was known to have stored mustard gas and other chemical weapons during the period of the Second World War.

== First World War ==
The grass meadow of Helperby was requisitioned in 1916 for the use of No. 33 Squadron, which used the site between March and October 1916. Helperby was then used by No. 76 Squadron from October 1916 onwards; it was one of three stations in Yorkshire with flight detachments from the 76 Squadron headquarters airfield at RAF Ripon (the other two being Copmanthorpe and Catterick). The detachment at Helperby was designated as B Flight, and flew BE2 and Avro 504 aircraft. During this period, No. 76 Squadron were on hand to intercept Zeppelin raids, which they did over Middlesbrough and the east coast of England, frequently during 1917.

Unusually for a small airfield in Yorkshire used in the Home Defence role, Helperby was furnished with at least two hangars, and the airfield itself was far larger than the grassed fields normally used. The hangars measured 90-foot (27 m) by 60-foot (18 m) and the overall size of the base was 81 acres (33 ha).

No. 76 Squadron used the airfield until March 1919, when they were transferred to Bramham Moor. A relinquishment notice was posted in November 1919, with confirmation of total abandonment by January 1920.

== Second World War ==
From 1939, No. 92 Maintenance Unit RAF (No. 92 MU) operated the site, converting it into an Advanced Ammunition Park (AAP), which largely serviced the needs of No. 6 Group Bomber Command, whose airfields were spread out across Yorkshire. The site also made use of civilian labourers, prisoners-of war (usually Italians) and the USAAF, who also had bomb storage at Brafferton. The site was one of three bomb dumps in the Yorkshire region; the other two being at Driffield (Southburn - No. 91 MU), and Bowes Moor, (No. 81 MU). The site had a cinema known as the Brafferdrome, and a siding was installed from the adjacent Pilmoor, Boroughbridge and Knaresborough Railway to bring munitions in by train. It has been estimated that between 1941 and 1947, 250,000 tonnes (280,000 tons) of ordnance were moved in and out of Brafferton by rail.

In December 1940, a 250-pound (110 kg) still-fused bomb was being offloaded at the site. Unbeknownst to the workers, the bomb had been returned from a live mission aircraft which had landed at RAF Linton-on-Ouse. As it was being unloaded, it exploded, killing three airmen and wounding several others. A flight sergeant and a corporal were later awarded the British Empire Medal for retrieving the bodies of the dead from the resulting fire.

The site was used up until 1947, when No. 92 MU were disbanded. No. 92 MU was later reformed and was again responsible for storage of bombs at RAF Faldingworth.

The shell of at least one of the hangars was still there in the early 1980s, and in 1985, it was revealed as one of the sites formerly used to store mustard gas ordnance, some of which had been disposed of by burning, and so some of the chemicals may have leached into the ground. Large quantities of mustard gas stocks were sent to the Port of Cairnryan to be disposed of in the Irish Sea as part of Operation Sandcastle. Parts of the site have been returned to farmland.
