= Beverley Aerodrome =

British air base from World War 1

Beverley Aerodrome Beverley Westwood
- Beverley, East Riding of Yorkshire in England
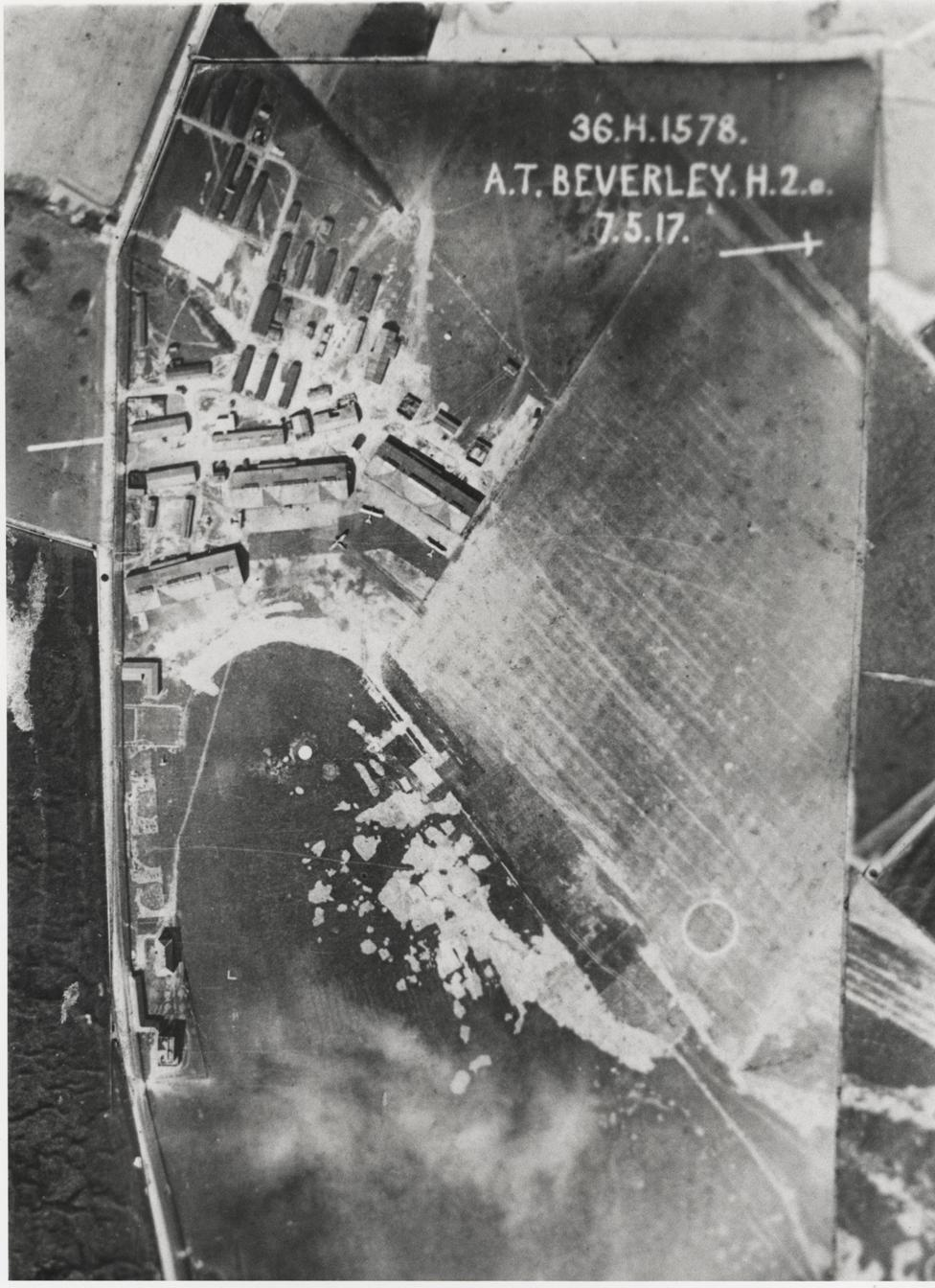
- RFC Training Depot Station No.36, (Beverley 1917). The line on the left is the road to York; north is towards the right

Site information
- Type: Military aerodrome
- Owner: Air Ministry
- Operator: Royal Flying Corps; Royal Air Force
- Controlled by: 8th Wing
- Open to the public: As racecourse site only

Location
- Coordinates: 53.843°N 0.457°W
- Grid reference: TA018398
- Area: 229 acres (93 ha)

Site history
- Built: 1915
- In use: 1916-1920 (for flying use)
- Fate: Returned to racing

Garrison information
- Occupants: See list

Airfield information
- Elevation: 100 feet (30 m) AMSL
Runways
Direction	Length and surface
	Grass

Beverley Aerodrome, was a First World War era Royal Flying Corps training depot (No. 36), in Bishop Burton, East Riding of Yorkshire, England. The site, like many others in Yorkshire, was developed from a racecourse on the western edge of Beverley, along the road between Beverley and York. Initially set up as a location for squadrons employed in Home Defence (HD), particularly preventing Zeppelin attacks on Hull and the east coast, the site later became a training depot for squadrons and flights who would then deploy to the front line. Beverley was also used as a standing up and transfer location for six Canadian Reserve Squadrons in 1917, all of which were posted to Canada. Beverley Aerodrome was used between 1916 and 1920, with the RAF later using the site in the 1930s in a non-flying role.

Although named as Beverley, and occupying a large part of the racecourse site, the hangars and technical area of Beverley Aerodrome were actually located in the parish of Bishop Burton.

== History ==
In 1915, the Air Ministry gave notice to Beverley Town Council that it would be requisitioning 179 acres (72 ha) of land at Beverley Racecourse and they should be prepared for that by administering the necessary water and sewerage concerns. Commandeering Beverley Racecourse for an aerodrome was common Royal Flying Corps practice at that time, other similar aerodromes in Yorkshire at Doncaster, Hedon, Knavesmire, Redcar, and Ripon, had all been located on racecourses. The siting of an air station at the racecourse involved closing the adjacent public road which ran between Beverley and York. Sentries were posted at the western and eastern ends of the road to check passes of people using the right of way where the road trails along the southern edge of the racecourse. The flying area was to the north and west of the racecourse, with the hangarage and technical area to the south and west, which placed it inside the parish of Bishop Burton. The site was on a common area known as Westwood, which led to the aerodrome being sometimes listed as Beverley Westwood. Initially, the take for the site covered 179 acres (72 ha), with a landing area measuring 1,150 yards (1,050 m) by 600 yards (550 m). However, a further 50 acres (20 ha) was also taken to the North Western edge of the racecourse to facilitate a larger landing and take-off area.

The first squadron at the aerodrome was No. 47 Squadron, which stood up on 1 March 1916, with the direction of the defence of East Yorkshire and Hull from Zeppelin attacks. On the night of 5/6 March 1916, at least three Zeppelins attacked the East Riding area, including Beverley town, but 47 Sqn were not prepared enough to combat the threat. Later the same month, No. 33 Squadron were moved to Bramham Moor as the HQ, with flights dispersed across northern England, including one at Beverley ('C Flight'). The role of 33 Sqn at Beverley was the same as No. 47 Squadron; to protect the Humber ports against Zeppelin attacks. Both squadrons found themselves in action on the night of 1/2 April 1916, when again, Zeppelin attacks threatened northern England. One BE2C of 47 Sqn was lost during the confrontation, but this was attributed to engine failure.

The defensive patrols continued, and aircraft from Beverley were in action again on the night of 2/3 May 1916. However, the long summer nights were free from Zeppelin attacks and a rethink of aircraft allocation saw a focus on fighting on the Western Front. So whilst No. 33 Sqn stayed at the base for the time being, their aircraft numbers on the squadron dropped from eighteen to six. However, 47 Sqn spent only six months training before departing for Devonport in September 1916, and then sailing for Salonika in Greece.

A month after No. 47 Squadron left, 'C Flight' of No. 33 Squadron departed for Elsham. This left Beverley without an operational squadron until January 1917, when No. 82 Squadron formed at Doncaster and moved to Beverley for seven weeks, before moving on again to Waddington on the 30 March 1917. Similarly, No. 80 Squadron arrived with their Camels from Montrose on 27 November 1917, staying for exactly two months, leaving on 27 January 1918 for the Western Front in France.

Non-enemy related crashes occurred, though less so at intensive training airfields such as Redcar, Markse or Bramham Moor. One crash covered widely in the local press was when a biplane crashed into some allotment on Chanterlands Avenue in Hull, killing the pilot.

During January, February, March and April 1917, six Canadian Reserve Squadrons either formed, or passed through Beverley whilst standing up to squadron strength, before being transferred overseas, either to Camp Borden, or Mohawk in Canada. Both 78 and 79 squadrons formed in January 1917, and were sent to Camp Borden, whilst No. 82 Reserve Squadron was formed at Montrose on 20 February 1917, leaving from Beverley one week later for Camp Borden. No. 83 Reserve Squadron formed at Catterick in January 1917, again transiting through Beverley to Mohawk in May 1917, though being listed as not having any aircraft. No. 89 Reserve Squadron formed at Turnhouse in March 1917, and left Beverley for Leaside in May of that year. No. 90 Reserve Squadron formed at Doncaster in March 1917, and left for Canada in June 1917.

In January 1918, No. 72 training Squadron were posted in from RFC Wyton in Cambridgeshire. The squadron were flying S.E.5s, Camels, and 504s. The squadron stayed at Beverley until disbandment in March 1919. A survey conducted by the RAF in August 1918 determined that the base had 332 personnel, with 60 of those under training. The base measured 1,150 yards (1,050 m) by 600 yards (550 m), and was 100 feet (30 m) above sea level. Although No. 72 Squadron ceased flying in March 1919, the base remained active until June 1919, and was not placed on the disposal register until November 1920.

== Post war ==
A memorial was erected in the church at Bishop Burton to the 17 airmen (Note: Some sources state 18 airmen were killed at Beverley. The IWM link has an image which shows only 17 names, and states this amount to be the correct one.) who died in training accidents at Beverley Aerodrome. The memorial is situated in Bishop Burton as that is the parish where the main part of the base was located (the western edge of the aerodrome).

Whilst the site was largely returned to civil use, a small unit belonging to the RAF tested radio telephones at Beverley during the 1930s, and in the Second World War, the technical area including the hangars, was used by the army.

One of the extant buildings at the racecourse site is believed to have built when the aerodrome was in action.

== Units ==
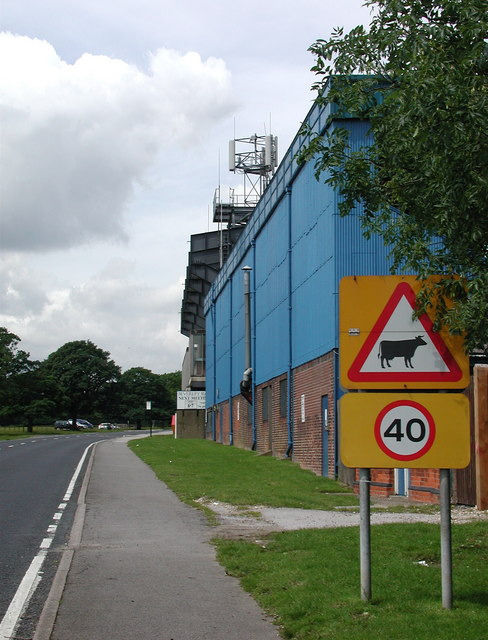
The back of one of the stands at Beverley Racecourse. This is located at what was the hangarage and technical site at Beverley Aerodrome

This background indicates a Royal Canadian Air Force squadron

Units based at Beverley Aerodrome
Unit	Dates	Details	Ref
No. 33 Squadron	29 March 1916 – 3 October 1916	One flight of aircraft detached from 33 Sqn HQ at Bramham Moor until squadron moved to Gainsborough for its HQ	
No. 34 Squadron	March 1916 – 15 June 1916	Formed at Castle Bromwich in January 1916, moved to Beverley, then posted to Lilbourne	
No. 36 Reserve Squadron	5 July 1916 – 31 May 1917	Formed at Beverley, redesignated as No. 36 Training Squadron 31 May 1917	
No. 36 Training Squadron	31 May 1917 – 27 November 1917	Formed from No. 36 Reserve Squadron, posted to Montrose	
No. 47 Squadron	1 March 1916 – 5 September 1916	Formed at Beverley, posted to Salonika	
No. 60 Reserve Squadron	7 April 1917 – 14 April 1917	Posted to Brattleby Aerodrome (RAF Scampton from the Second World War onwards)	
No. 72 Training Squadron	January 1918 – March 1919	Arrived from Wyton, disbanded at Beverley	
No. 78 Reserve Squadron	January 1917 – 15 February 1917	Formed at Beverley, moved to Camp Borden, Canada	
No. 79 Reserve Squadron	January 1917 – 15 February 1917	Formed at Beverley by redesigning an element of No. 36 Training Squadron, moved to camp Borden, Canada	
No. 80 Squadron	November 1917 (Note: Actual dates of arrival vary, but most agree the month was November in 1917.) – 27 January 1918	Arrived from Montrose, posted to Boisdinghem, France	
No. 82 Squadron	6 February 1917 – 30 March 1917	Arrived from Doncaster, posted to Waddington	
No. 82 Reserve Squadron	20 February 1917 – 27 February 1917	Arrived from Montrose, posted to Canada	
No. 83 Reserve Squadron	March 1917	Arrived from Catterick, posted to Canada	
No. 89 Reserve Squadron	April 1917 – May 1917		
No. 90 Reserve Squadron	April 1917 – May 1917		

== Notable personnel ==
- Frederick McCall, Canadian airmen who underwent training at Beverley
