= Bramham Moor Aerodrome =

Former military airfield in West Yorkshire, England

Bramham Moor Aerodrome RAF Tadcaster
- Bramham, West Yorkshire in England
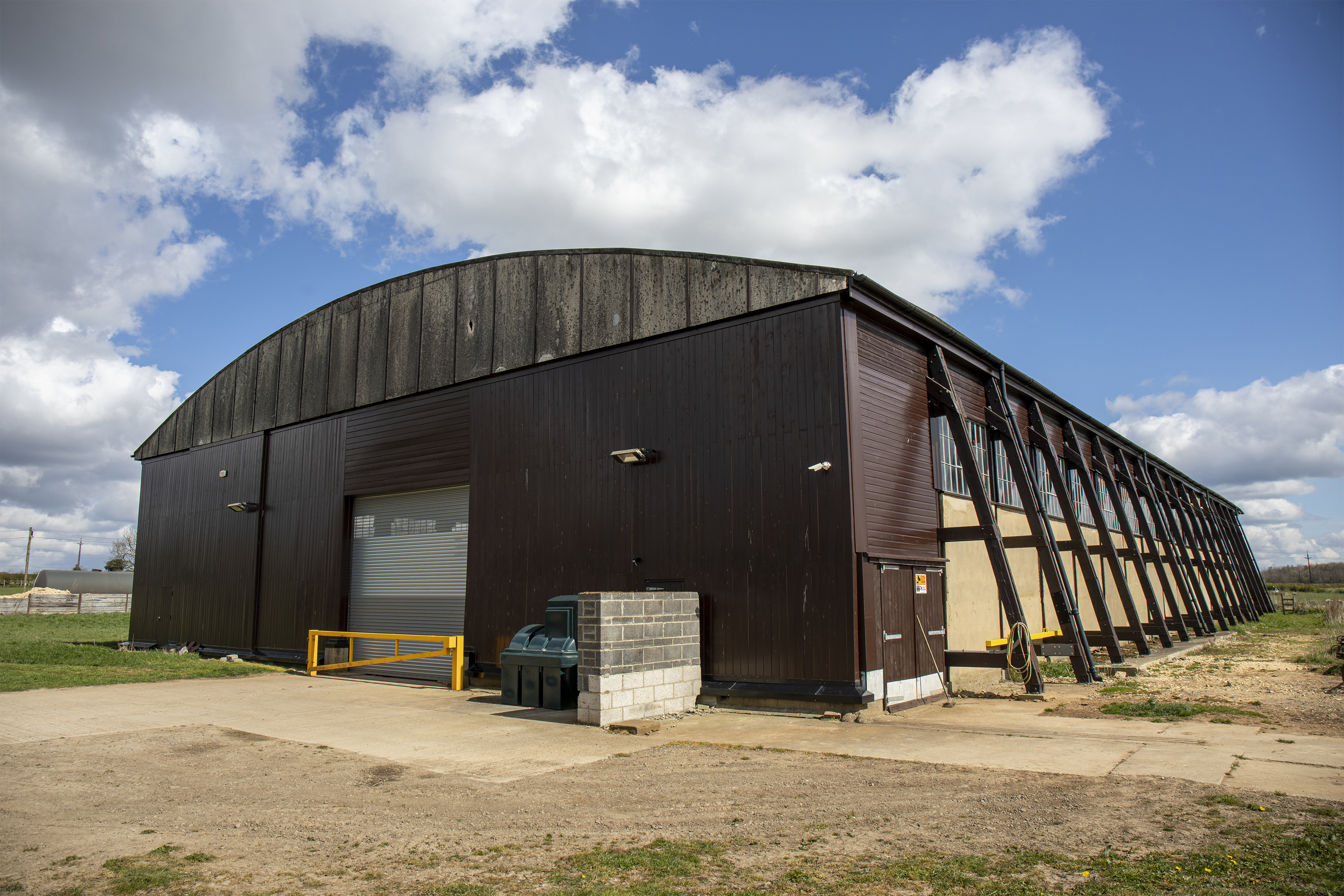
- Bramham Moor aerodrome hangar

Site information
- Type: Military aerodrome
- Owner: Air Ministry
- Operator: Royal Flying Corps; Royal Air Force

Location
- Coordinates: 53.864°N 1.321°W
- Grid reference: SE445413
- Area: 200 acres (81 ha) (size in 1919)
- Height: 150 feet (46 m)

Site history
- Built: 1915
- In use: May 1916 – April 1920
- Fate: Agricultural use

Garrison information
- Occupants: See list
- Designations: Hangar grade II listed

Airfield information
Runways
Direction	Length and surface
Grass

Bramham Moor Aerodrome, (later known as RAF Tadcaster), was a First World War era military airfield near to the village of Bramham, West Yorkshire, England. Initially a Royal Flying Corps site, on the formation of the RAF, its name was officially changed to RAF Tadcaster, however, the unit was still referred to as Bramham, or Bramham Moor, even in official documents. The base was used between March 1916 and December 1919 by active aircraft squadrons, but was not closed down until April 1920. Bramham was originally used as a Home Defence station, due to the threat of Zeppelin attacks, but later, it was used primarily for preparing aircrew for front line operations. It did not see re-use as an airfield during the Second World War, however, vehicles were parked on the grassed runway areas to deter glider landings during the threat of invasion.

The base was notable in the First World War for being the location where the first Arab officers in the Royal Air Force underwent training.

== History ==
The base was located east of the village of Bramham, (near to the 1408 battlefield) and due north of the Leeds to York road, which is now the A64, 2.75 miles (4.43 km) south west of Tadcaster, and 10 miles (16 km) south west of York. As it was situated on Bramham Moor, the airfield was known by this name. Originally built from late 1915 at a cost of £108,000, the airfield was basic, with nine Bessonneau hangars aligned along the course of what is the A64 road at the southern edge of the field. The site was expanded during 1917/1918 with four permanent hangars and ancillary buildings being built on the northern edge of the grass field. The airfield was grass as no concrete runway was laid, and "no attempt had been made to level the ground", however, the telegraph wires which caused many accidents on landing approaches in the early days, were later buried in the ground.

The first unit detailed at Bramham was No. 33 Squadron, who were posted in from Filton with BE2c aircraft. No. 33 Sqn had their HQ and one flight based at Bramham; the other flights were at Beverley, York (Knavesmire), and Coal Aston. The squadron had been posted north to protect the North Midlands and Yorkshire from enemy attacks, but also had a remit for training. In June 1916, the squadron converted to the BE12, converting again only a month later onto the Bristol Scout. They were relieved of the training element when No. 57 Squadron was formed at Copmanthorpe and Bramham in June 1916, from the 'B' and 'C' Flights of 33 Squadron. No. 57 Squadron originally had BE2c and Avro 504k aircraft, but in October 1916, they re-equipped with Fe2d before departing Bramham for St André-aux-Bois in December 1916. The base had originally been envisioned as a Home Defence site, to counter the Zeppelin threat in the North of England, despite some attacks, it was seen by the Germans, that the Zeppelins were ineffective at bombing missions, and, after 1916, the number of attacks decreased, which also changed the purpose of the station towards training.

Reports and records refer to the site as Bramham Moor and Tadcaster equally (Halley lists it only as Tadcaster). A memorandum issued in late December 1916 stated that the site should be referred to in official reports as RFC Bramham Moor. At the formation of the Royal Air Force in April 1918, the name of the station was changed to RAF Tadcaster, however, the unit was still referred to often as either Bramham or Bramham Moor in official documents.

On 15 July 1918, No. 38 Training Depot Station (38 TDS) was formed, however, its life was short and it disbanded just over a year later. At the same time, three USAAS aero squadrons, No.s 156, 168 and 176 passed through the station in July 1918, but this was a very short-term deployment. When America entered the First World War, they sent their squadrons straight to the front line, but as they lacked combat experience, heavy losses occurred. It was felt that a level of training at an RFC base would benefit aircrew, so some US squadrons were rotated through the aerodrome.

In March 1919, No. 76 Squadron was posted in from Ripon. The squadron had previously had a Home Defence role at Ripon (HQ), Copmanthorpe, Helperby and Catterick.

In January 1919, No. 38 Training Squadron consisted of around 400 personnel, but by July 1919, the complement of the base numbered 279 personnel; 207 RAF (48 officers, 159 other ranks), 68 WRAF (2 officers, 66 other ranks) and 4 civilian staff. The last unit at the station was No. 38 Training Depot Squadron, which disbanded in December 1919, however, the base itself was still used to store aircraft for disposal and was not closed until April 1920.

=== Arab pilots in the RAF ===
In May 1918, two pilots from the Middle-East region were posted to RAF Tadcaster for training. Both had been pilots in the Ottoman Air Corps, and with the situation deteriorating in their homelands (the collapse of the Ottoman Empire), they volunteered for training with the RAF in a deal brokered by Sir Mark Sykes. They spent at least three months at Tadcaster, before contracting influenza, which most of 8 Wing (their training cohort) had done too. In the end, both pilots became dissatisfied that they were not given the rank that they were promised (captain), which was their commensurate rank in their previous air force.

== Post war ==
The site wasn't used by aircraft in the Second World War, however, fears of it being used by enemy forces to land gliders on it during an invasion, led to the site being littered with old vehicles. The site is used by an agricultural college with one remaining First World War hangar, (of the same design as the remaining examples at Duxford and Hendon), which is grade II listed. It is believed that three other hangars were built on site from aerial photographic evidence that show the building outlines from their cropmarks. The majority of the site is now used as farmland.

== Units ==
Units based at Bramham Moor/RAF Tadcaster
Unit	Dates	Details	Ref
No. 14 Training Squadron	July 1917 – July 1918	Arrived from Catterick, merged with No. 68 Training Squadron to become 38 Training Depot Station	
No. 33 Squadron	Mar 1916 – October 1916	Arrived from Filton, moved to Gainsborough	
No. 38 Training Depot Station	July 1918 – August 1919	Formed from Nos 14 and 68 Training Squadrons, disbanded to form No. 38 Training Squadron	
No. 38 Training Squadron	August 1919 – December 1919	Formed from No. 38 Training Depot Station, however, the squadron had no recorded aircraft	
No. 41 Training Squadron	July 1916 – August 1916	Formed at Bramham Moor, moved to Doncaster	
No. 46 Reserve Squadron	December 1916 – July 1917	Arrived from Doncaster, departed for Catterick	
No. 57 Squadron	August 1916 – December 1916	Formed from a flight of 33 Squadron, posted to St. André-aux-Bois	
No. 68 Reserve Squadron	April 1917 – July 1918	Moved from Catterick, disbanded at Tadcaster to form No. 38 Training Depot Station	
No. 74 Training Squadron	June 1918 – July 1918	Disbanded at Tadcaster to merge with 36 Training Squadron to become No. 26 Training Depot station at RAF Edzell	
No. 75 Squadron	1 – 12 October 1916	Formed at Bramham, moved to Goldington 12 days later (Note: Jefford, Lake and Philpott, all maintain that 75 Squadron formed at Bramham, whilst the squadron records in the Public Record Office, Delve, Chorlton and Halpenny, state that Goldington was where the squadron stood up.)	
No. 76 Squadron	March 1919 – June 1919	Arrived from RAF Helperby, disbanded at Tadcaster 13 June 1919	
No. 94 Squadron	February 1918 – June 1919	Arrived from France (Izel-le-Hameau), disbanded at Tadcaster	

== Notable personnel ==
- Stearne Tighe Edwards
- Lloyd Andrews Hamilton, was a student at the base
- Philip Joubert de la Ferté, officer commanding No. 33 Squadron
- Frederick McCall, Canadian airman who underwent training at Bramham (listed as Tadcaster)
