= No. 82 Squadron RAF =

British flying squadron, 1917–1963

No. 82 (United Provinces) Squadron RAF
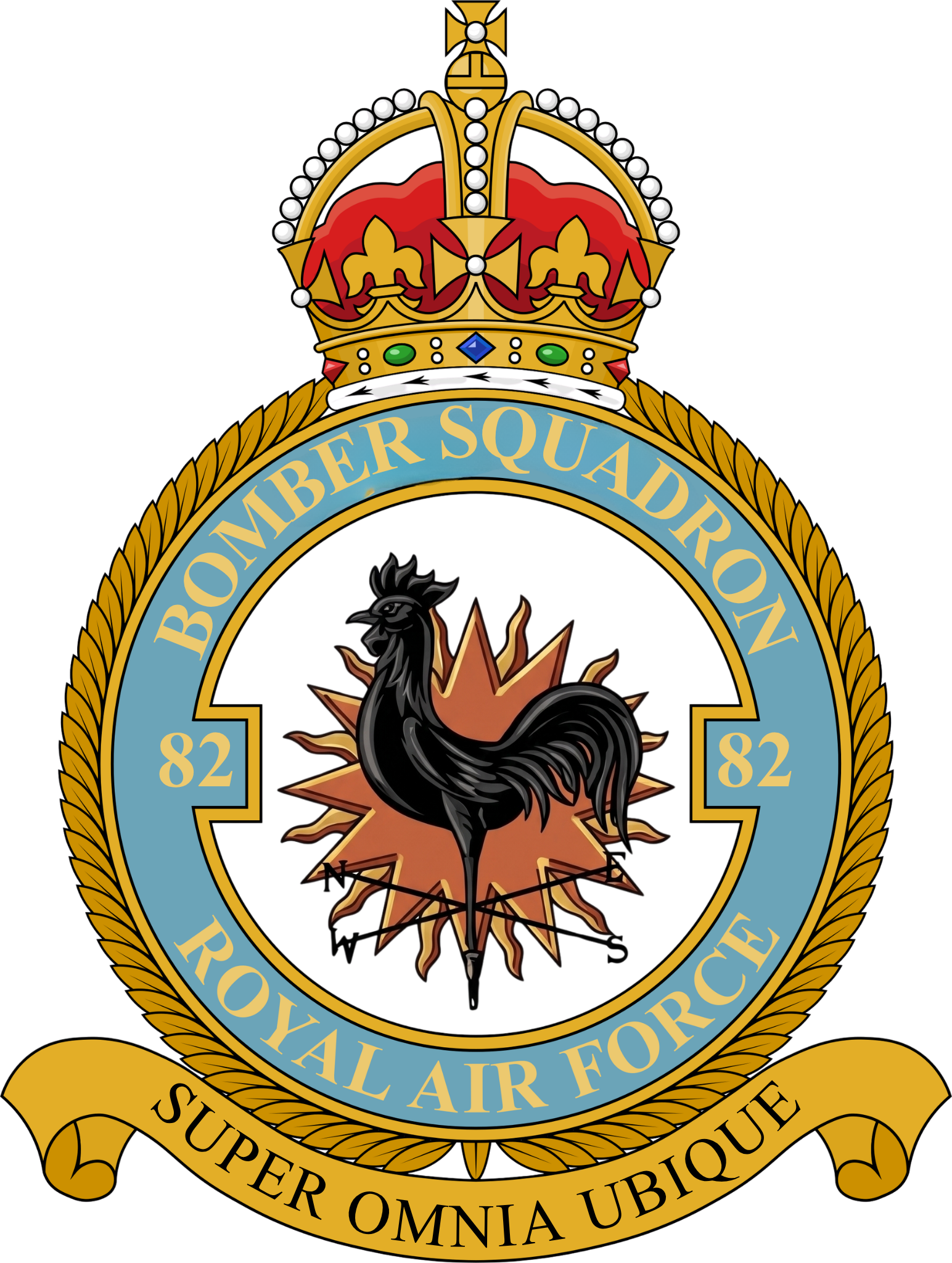
- Squadron badge of No. 82 Squadron
- Active: 7 January 1917 – 30 June 1919; 14 June 1937 – 15 March 1946; 1 Oct 1946 – 1 September 1956; 22 July 1959 – 10 July 1963
- Country: United Kingdom
- Branch: Royal Air Force
- Nickname: United Provinces; Coventry's 'own' Squadron
- Mottos: Latin: Super omnia ubique ("Over all things everywhere")

Insignia
- Squadron badge heraldry: In front of a sun in splendour a weathercock
- Squadron codes: OZ (Nov 1938 – Sep 1939); UX (Sep 1939 – Mar 1946)

No. 82 Squadron RAF was a Royal Air Force squadron that was first formed in 1917 and disbanded in 1963. It served at times as a bomber unit, a reconnaissance unit and lastly as an Intermediate Range Ballistic Missile (IRBM) unit.

== History ==
=== Formation and First World War ===
No.82 Squadron Royal Flying Corps was formed at RAF Doncaster, Yorkshire as an army co-operation unit on 7 January 1917. It deployed to France flying Armstrong Whitworth FK8 aircraft on 20 November 1917, It was declared operational in January 1918, flying artillery spotting and photo-reconnaissance over the Western Front, undertaking numerous missions in response to the German spring offensive. It continued to fly army co-operation missions until the Armistice ended the fighting on the Western Front. The squadron was disbanded on 30 June 1919.

=== Reformation and Second World War ===
No. 82 Squadron was reformed as a light-bomber squadron from a flight detached from No. 142 Squadron, equipped with the Hawker Hind at RAF Andover on 14 June 1937 and joining No. 2 Group. The squadron transferred to No. 1 Group and moved to RAF Cranfield on 8 July 1937. It re-equipped with Blenheim Mk Is during 1938, returning to 2 Group on 15 July that year (Note: It returned to 2 Group in August 1939 according to Bowyer.) and received the more advanced Blenheim Mk.IV in August 1939, moving to RAF Watton on 22 August.

The squadron started the Second World War flying anti-shipping missions over the North Sea, one of its aircraft sinking the German submarine U-31 near Wilhelmshaven on 11 March 1940, though U-31 was subsequently raised, and returned to service, only to be sunk again, this time by a destroyer, in November. On 10 May 1940, Germany invaded France and the Low Countries, and 82 Squadron was deployed in attacks against the German forces. On 17 May, 12 Blenheims were sent to attack German forces near Gembloux, Belgium, but the expected fighter escort did not show up, and after one Blenheim was shot by German flak, the remaining aircraft were intercepted by Messerschmitt Bf 109s, with ten more aircraft being shot down. 22 aircrew were killed and 3 taken prisoner. Despite these losses, it continued to fly missions in support of the BEF, and after the evacuation from Dunkirk, against German held airfields and invasion barges in the Channel ports. On 13 August, a raid on an airfield at Aalborg, Denmark again suffered catastrophic losses to German fighters, losing eleven out of twelve.

From early 1941, the squadron played a prominent part in No. 2 Group's offensive against shipping in the English Channel and North Sea. Losses continued both to fighters and to flak defences.

A detachment was sent to Malta in May 1941, with the rest of the Squadron following in June. It flew ships against enemy shipping and ports through into July, but extremely heavy losses led to it being withdrawn back to the UK at the end of the month, being replaced by 110 Squadron. Once back in the UK, it continued anti-shipping strikes as part of 2 Group.

=== To India ===
The squadron left Bomber Command and relocated to RAF Cholavarum, India in early 1942. Re-equipped with Vultee Vengeance dive-bombers the squadron began anti-submarine patrols on 17 November. In June 1943, the squadron began bombing operations against Imperial Japanese targets in Burma from RAF Salbani. it was deployed against the Japanese offensive against Imphal and Kohima. The squadron was re-equipped with Mosquitoes in July 1944, but was temporarily grounded due to failures in the wooden structure before commencing ground attack sorties on 19 December. These operations continued until 12 May 1945, when the squadron was withdrawn to India to prepare for the proposed invasion of Malaya. This operation did not occur due to the end of the war, and the squadron was disbanded on 15 March 1946.

=== Post-war operations in Africa ===
On 1 October 1946, the squadron was reformed at RAF Benson equipped with Avro Lancasters and Supermarine Spitfire PR. XIXs to undertake aerial surveys of Nigeria, the Gold Coast, Sierra Leone and Gambia. The squadron moved to Kenya in October 1947, it was flying from RAF Eastleigh, Nairobi, by 1950. In 1952, the squadron relocated to the UK and was re-equipped with Canberras in November 1953, remaining in the reconnaissance role. On 1 September 1956 the squadron was disbanded.

=== On Thor missiles ===
No. 82 Squadron reformed once again on 22 July 1959 at RAF Shepherds Grove as a Thor missile unit, part of Project Emily. The upcoming ICBM missiles however soon made the Thor Intermediate Range Ballistic Missile obsolete, and in 1962 the Minister of Defence announced the phase-out of the Thor missiles. The unit therefore was disbanded the last time on 10 July 1963.

== Aircraft operated ==
| From | To | Aircraft | Variant |
|---|---|---|---|
| Aug 1917 | Feb 1919 | Royal Aircraft Factory F.E.8 | AW FK8 |
| Jun 1937 | Mar 1938 | Hawker Hart | |
| Mar 1938 | Sep 1939 | Bristol Blenheim | Mk.I |
| Aug 1939 | Mar 1942 | Bristol Blenheim | Mk.IV |
| Aug 1942 | Jul 1944 | Vultee Vengeance | Mks.I, Ia |
| Apr 1943 | Jul 1944 | Vultee Vengeance | Mk.II |
| Mar 1944 | Jul 1944 | Vultee Vengeance | Mk.III |
| Jul 1944 | Mar 1946 | de Havilland Mosquito | Mk.VI |
| Oct 1946 | Oct 1947 | Supermarine Spitfire | PR.19 |
| Oct 1946 | Dec 1953 | Avro Lancaster | PR.1 |
| Nov 1953 | Feb 1955 | English Electric Canberra | PR.3 |
| Oct 1954 | Sep 1956 | English Electric Canberra | PR.7 |
| Jul 1959 | Jul 1963 | PGM-17 Thor | |

== Squadron bases ==
| From | To | Place | County/Country |
|---|---|---|---|
| 7 Jan 1917 | 6 Feb 1917 | RAF Doncaster | Yorkshire |
| 6 Feb 1917 | 30 Mar 1917 | Beverley | Yorkshire |
| 30 Mar 1917 | 17 Nov 1917 | RAF Waddington | Lincolnshire |
| 17 Nov 1917 | 20 Nov 1917 | Saint-Omer | Pas-de-Calais, France |
| 20 Nov 1917 | 22 Jan 1918 | Savy | Aisne, France |
| 22 Jan 1918 | 22 Mar 1918 | Golancourt (Bonneuil) | Oise, France |
| 22 Mar 1918 | 24 Mar 1918 | Catigny | Oise, France |
| 25 Aug 1939 | 1 Oct 1940 | RAF Watton | Norfolk |
| 1 Oct 1940 | 18 Apr 1941 | RAF Bodney | Norfolk |
| 18 Apr 1941 | 3 May 1941 | RAF Lossiemouth | Morayshire |
| 3 May 1941 | 21 Mar 1942 | RAF Bodney | Norfolk |
| 11 June 1941 | 21 Mar 1942 | Luqa (Detachment) | Malta |
| 24 May 1942 | 11 Jun 1942 | Karachi | Sindh, British India (then, now Sindh, Pakistan) |
| 11 Jun 1942 | 6 Jul 1942 | Quetta | Baluchistan (then, now Balochistan (Pakistan)) |
| 6 Jul 1942 | 5 Mar 1943 | Cholavaram | Madras Presidency (then, now Tamil Nadu, India) |
| 2 Jul 1942 | 28 Oct 1942 | Karachi (Detachment) | Sindh |
| 26 Feb 1943 | 5 Mar 1943 | Madhaiganj (Detachment) | United Provinces (now Uttar Pradesh, India) |
| 5 Mar 1943 | 12 Apr 1943 | Madhaiganj | United Provinces |
| 12 Apr 1943 | 23 May 1943 | Asansol | Bengal (then, now West Bengal, India) |
| 23 May 1943 | 13 Aug 1943 | Salboni | Bengal (then, now West Bengal, India) |
| 31 May 1943 | 20 Jun 1943 | Chittagong (Detachment) | Bengal (then, now Chittagong Division, Bangladesh) |
| 13 Aug 1943 | 21 Nov 1943 | Feni Airfield | Bengal (then, now Feni District, Bangladesh) |
| 21 Nov 1943 | 22 Jan 1944 | Dohazari | Bengal (then, now Chittagong Division, Bangladesh) |
| 22 Jan 1944 | 25 May 1944 | Jumchar | Bengal (then, now Chittagong Division, Bangladesh) |
| 20 Mar 1944 | 9 Apr 1944 | Kumbhirgram (Detachment) | Assam, India |
| 25 May 1944 | 5 Oct 1944 | Kolar | Karnataka, India |
| 5 Oct 1944 | 13 Dec 1944 | Ranchi | Bihar (then, now Jharkhand, India) |
| 13 Dec 1944 | 19 Dec 1944 | Chharra | United Provinces |
| 19 Dec 1944 | 26 Apr 1945 | Kumbhirgram | Assam |
| 26 Apr 1945 | 4 Jun 1945 | Joari | Bengal (then, now Chittagong Division, Bangladesh) |
| 4 Jun 1945 | 14 Oct 1945 | Cholavaram | Madras Presidency (then, now Tamil Nadu, India) |

== See also ==
- List of UK Thor missile bases
