= No. 189 Squadron RAF =

Defunct flying squadron of the Royal Air Force

No. 189 Squadron was a Royal Air Force squadron.

The squadron was formed at Royal Flying Corps Ripon (RFC Ripon) on 20 December 1917 as a night-flying training unit, moving shortly afterwards to Sutton's Farm. This work continued until the end of World War I. On 1 March 1919, the squadron was disbanded.

The squadron was re-formed as part of No. 5 Group RAF on 15 October 1944 at RAF Bardney near the village of Bardney in Lincolnshire. However, Jefford in RAF Squadrons lists the reformation date as November 1944.

The squadron flew Avro Lancaster bombers in raids over occupied Europe in 1944 and 1945.

The commanding officer was Wing Commander J. S. Shorthouse. Shorthouse had been born in Portsmouth in England in April 1920; joined the Royal New Zealand Air Force in April 1939; and transferred to the RAF in January 1940. He commanded the squadron in 1944–1945. He was awarded the Distinguished Flying Cross for an operation that predated his command of the squadron: he gained his DFC on 2 November 1943 for a bombing raid in September 1943.

After RAF Bardney, the squadron was based at RAF Fulbeck near the village of Fulbeck, returning to Bardney in April 1945 and then on to RAF Metheringham near Metheringham.

The unit was mixed, with many personnel from other parts of the Commonwealth including Australians, New Zealanders and Canadians.

No. 189 Squadron was among the 107 Lancasters and 12 Mosquitos of No 5 Group which attacked the oil refinery in Tonsberg in Southern Norway on 25 April 1945 in the last raid of the war flown by heavy bombers of RAF Bomber Command.

In July 1945 the Commanding Officer, Wing Commander Shorthouse, transferred back from the RAF to the RNZAF.

After the war the unit was involved in dropping food to the Dutch and repatriating POWs until it was disbanded on 20 November 1945.

== Aircraft operated ==
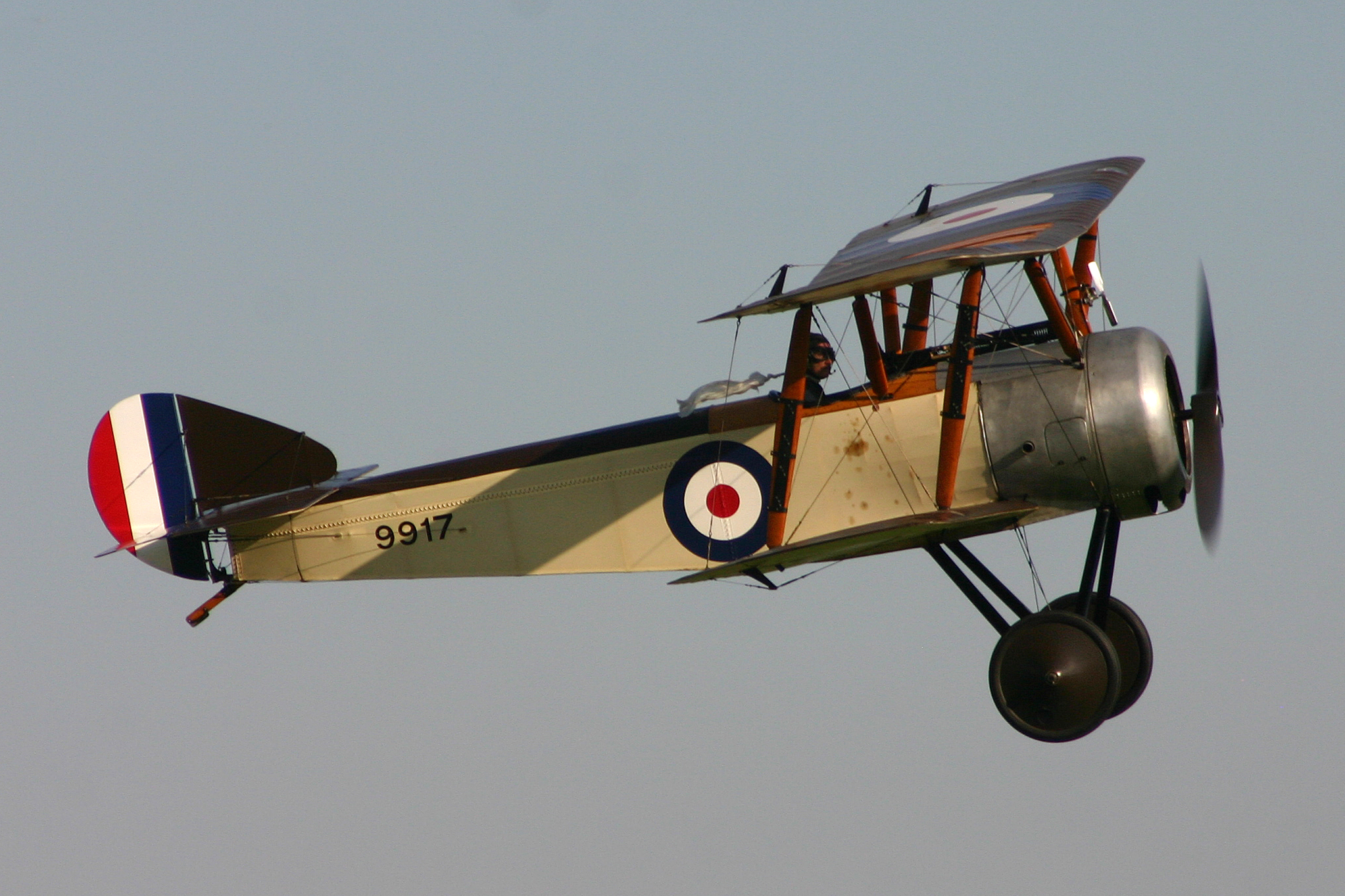
Sopwith Pup

- 1917 - Avro 504K
- 1917 - Royal Aircraft Factory BE2e
- 1917 - Sopwith Pup
- 1918 - Sopwith Camel
- 1944 - Avro Lancaster I and III

== Example of Operations ==
The following sortie details are taken from the operations record book for 189 sqdn.

DATE	AIRCRAFT TYPE & NUMBER	CREW	DUTY	TIME UP	TIME DOWN	DETAILS OF SORTIE OR FLIGHT
3 March 1945	LANC.1 ME.374	F/O WALTON.J.H.(AUS.417607); SGT HILLS.G.S. SGT HUDGELL.P.H. F/S ROBERTS.G.W. F/S THOMAS.R. SGT.BRIAN.E; SGT JONES.J.F	LADBERGEN	1835	0035	LADBERGEN. 2205 1/2 hrs. 8,800 ft. Target attacked on 3rd run, on 1st run attacked by fighter. R.T.I clearly seen in break in cloud. Flares seen well, N of A/P. Met. good. Red and green T.I.'s seen on 3rd run. Mod. amount of flak over target but not heavy. Considered successful sortie.
7/8 March 1945	LANC.1 PB.879	F/O RICCIUTI.G.A(CAN.J90848); SGT HIGHMOOR.W. F/S JOHNSON.H.D.(CAN.R186407); F/S THOMPSON.G.H. F/S MAINPRIZE.R.L.(CAN.F.259968); F/S BECKTEL.E.H.(CAN.R208373); F/S JONES.W.J.(CAN.264956)	HARBURG	1808	0101	HARBURG. 2207 1/2 hrs. 11,000 ft. Numerous explosions Orange, black smoke rising 4,500 ft. Concentrated large fires over the whole area 2209 hrs. Target was identified visually and marking very good. A large number of fires were burning right on the target and it was a very good effort. Considered successful sortie.
23 April 1945	LANC.1 PB.732	F/O WALTON.J.H.(Aus.417607); SGT HILLS.G.S; F/SGT HUDGELL.P.H. F/SGT THOMAS.J.P.D. W/O ROBERTS.G.W. (Aus.43242); SGT JONES.J.F; SGT.BRIAN.E	FLENSBURG	1512 1/2	2033	FLENSBURG. 10/10ths S/Cu, tops 6-8000'. A/C jettisoning from coast to Wash on way home. Sortie completed.
25 April 1945	LANC.1 PB.732	F/O WALTON.J.H.(AUS.417607); F/LT SKILTON.J.A. F/SGT HUDGELL.P.H. F/SGT THOMAS.J.P.D. W/O ROBERTS.G.W. (Aus.43242); SGT JONES.J.F; SGT.BRIAN.E	TONSBERG	2034 1/2	0321	TONSBERG. 2347 hrs, 9,500'. Bombing appeared well concentrated, two large explosions seen before bombing and one very large one at 2347 1/2 with quantities of smoke. Marking thought to be good. Sortie completed.
