= Almaza Air Base =

Military airfield/former airport (Egypt)

Almaza Air Base RAF Almaza
- Arabic: مطار ألماظة
- Heliopolis, Cairo, Cairo Governorate in Egypt
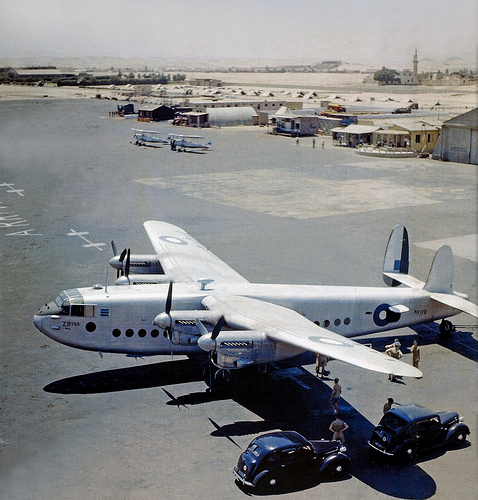
- RAF Avro York MW173, the personal aircraft of Air Chief Marshal Sir Keith Park, AOC Air Command South East Asia, at Almaza in 1946. In the background are Tiger Moths of the Egyptian airline Misr Airwork.

Site information
- Type: Air Base
- Owner: Ministry of Defense (Egypt)
- Operator: Egyptian Air Force

Location
- Shown within Egypt
- Coordinates: 30°05′40″N 031°21′35″E

Site history
- Built: 1920s
- In use: 1920s - present

Airfield information
- Identifiers: ICAO: HEAZ
- Elevation: 91 metres (299 ft) AMSL
Runways
Direction	Length and surface
05/23	1,194 metres (3,917 ft) Asphalt
18/36	2,050 metres (6,726 ft) Asphalt

Almaza Air Base is a Air base of the Egyptian Air Force located in Heliopolis, Cairo, Cairo Governorate. It was established as a civilian aerodrome, but was partly taken over by the British military, designated RAF Almaza. Today it is a military aerodrome of the Egyptian Air Force.

== History ==
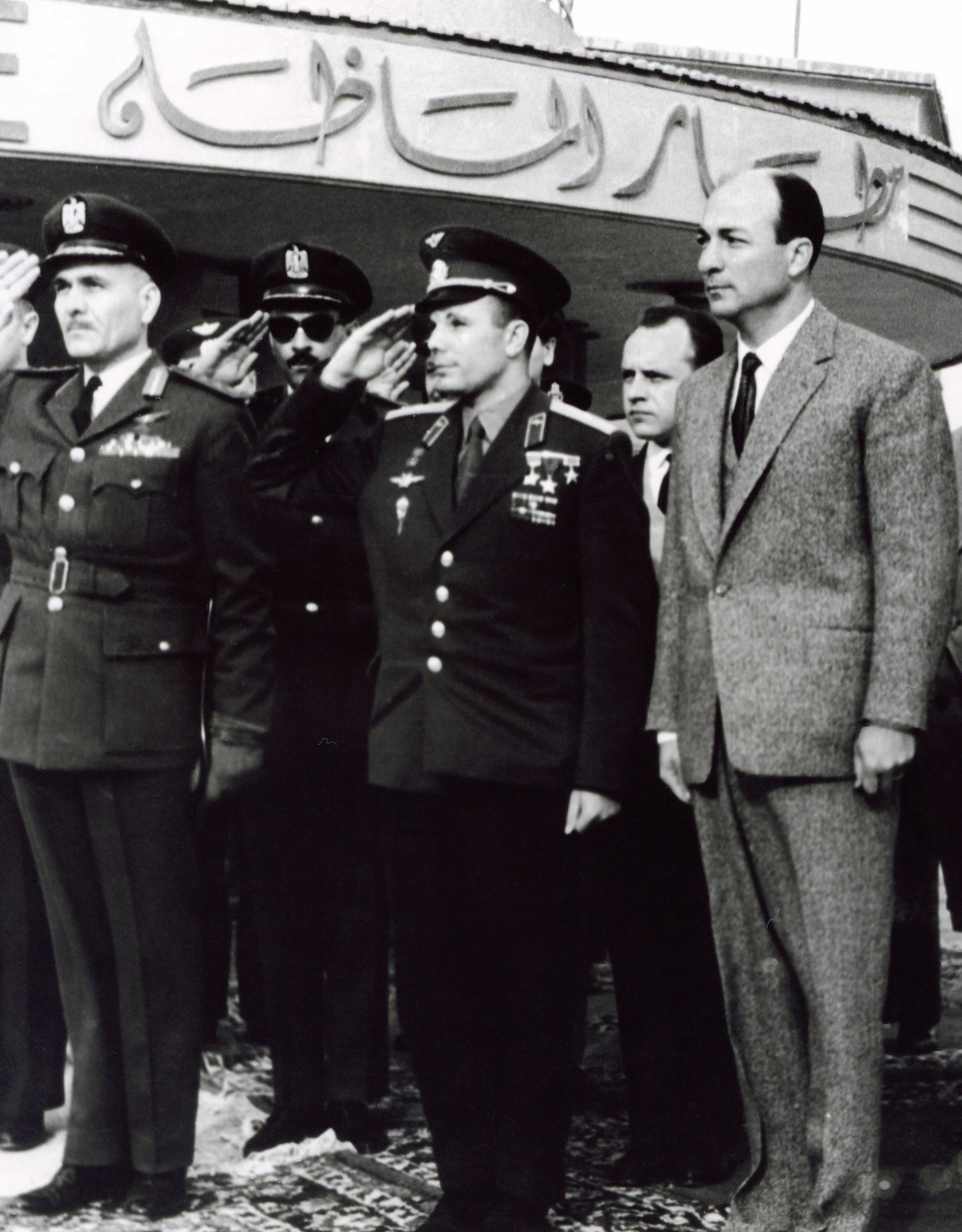
Gagarin and Mohieddin at Almaza, 1962

The aerodrome was established in the Cairo suburb of Heliopolis in February 1910, when Baron Empain organised the first air meeting in Africa. The event was supervised by the Aéro-Club de France, and attracted several leading French aviators, including Hubert Latham, Henri Rougier, Jacques Balsan, Hubert Le Blon, Mme. Raymonde de Laroche, and Belgian Arthur Duray. Other entrants included Hans Grade from Germany, Frederick van Riemsdijk from the Netherlands, and Hayden Sands from the USA (although apparently not an official entrant). The only British flier, Mortimer Singer, crashed during a practice flight, breaking his leg, and was forced to withdraw. The aerodrome remained active until the First World War, when the British Army built a new airfield immediately to the south-east. The original airfield site has now been completely built over, and is partially occupied by the Egyptian Military Academy.

In the 1920s it was named Almaza Airport by the Egyptian government after László Almásy. It became the first base of the Egyptian Army Air Force (EAAF) when on 2 June 1932 the first five de Havilland Gipsy Moth trainer aircraft arrived from Hatfield Aerodrome, north of London, flown by three Egyptian and two British pilots. The EAAF became independent in 1937 and was renamed the Royal Egyptian Air Force (REAF).

In December 1931 the Egyptian Parliament approved the formation of an Anglo-Egyptian company to undertake civil aviation enterprises in Egypt. The company, named Misr Airwork S.A., was empowered to establish and operate flying training schools, local passenger flights, service stations, housing, provisioning, maintenance and repair of civil aircraft, aerial photography and survey, as well as regular and occasional air transport services for carrying passengers, mail and freight. By 1938 the company, based at Almaza, was flying regular scheduled flights between Cairo and Alexandria, and to Assiut, Nicosia, Haifa, and Baghdad, operating a fleet comprising a D.H. Dragon, D.H. Dragonfly, three D.H.86s and five D.H. Rapides. The company became fully Egyptian-owned in 1948, was nationalized in 1949, and was renamed United Arab Airlines in 1961, and then EgyptAir in 1971.

During World War II the military aerodrome was renamed RAF Almaza, becoming EAF Almaza in 1947. Jane's Fighting Aircraft of World War II lists the EAF, roughly circa 1948, with six squadrons, of which Nos 1 and 3-6 were all at Almaza.

In 1956, during the Suez Crisis, it was bombed several times by the British. Almaza at that time had 25 Mikoyan-Gurevich MiG-15/Mikoyan-Gurevich MiG-17s, four Gloster Meteor, 21 de Havilland Vampire, and ten Ilyushin Il-28s.

On 5 February 1962 it witnessed the reception of Yuri Gagarin by Vice President of Egypt Zakaria Mohieddin.

== Royal Air Force units ==
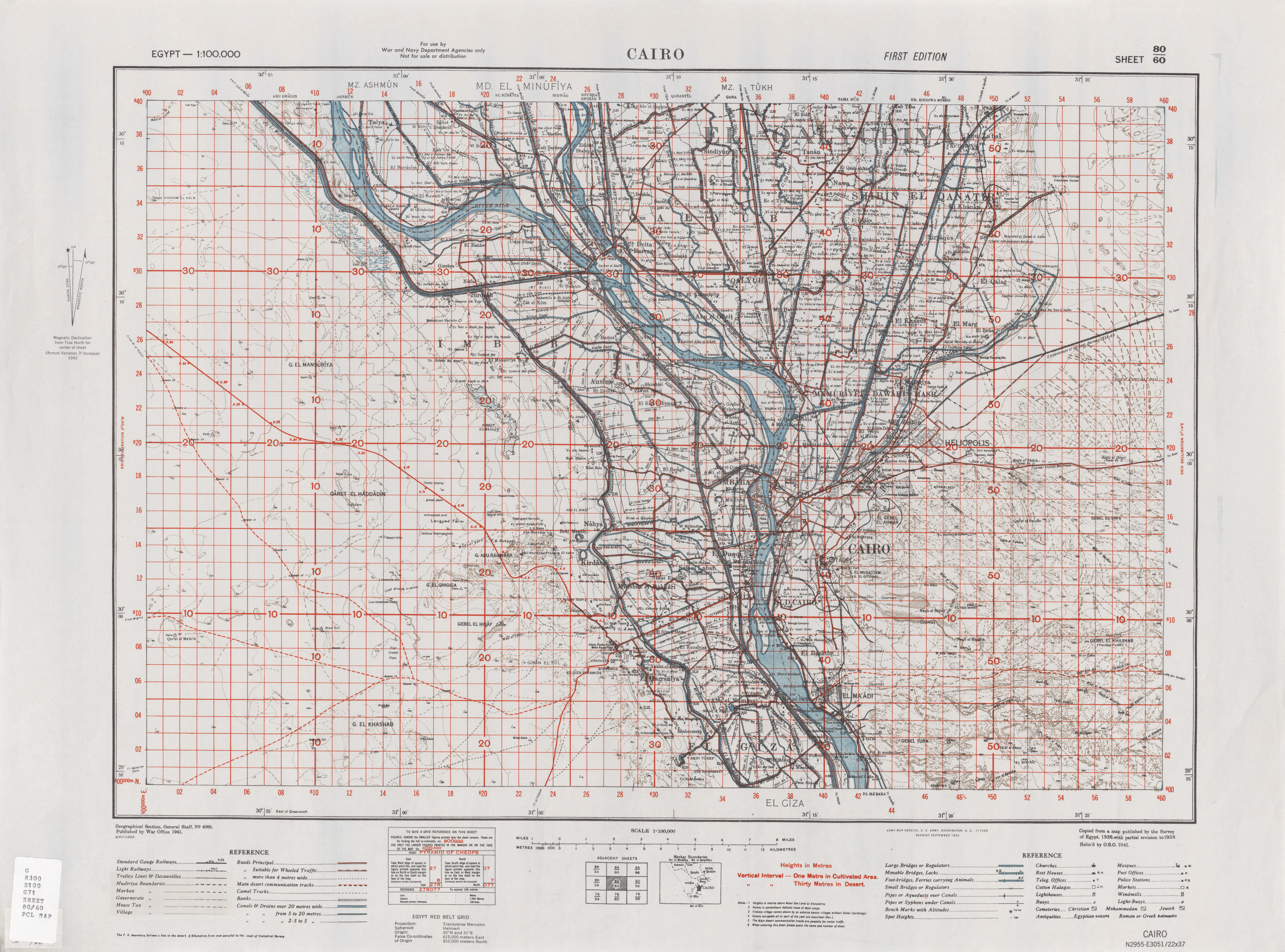
1941 Cairo Map showing Almaza on the right

RAF Almaza was home to the following squadrons:

- No. 45 Squadron RAF between 11 July 1921 and 14 March 1922 with the Airco DH.9, Vickers Vimy & Vickers Vernon
- No. 78 Squadron RAF between 20 September 1945 and 19 September 1946 with the Douglas Dakota
- Detachment from No. 94 Squadron RAF between August and October 1944 with Supermarine Spitfire VB
- No. 154 (Motor Industries) Squadron RAF between 11 February and 30 March 1944 with the Spitfire IX
- No. 216 Squadron RAF between 15 July 1945 and 5 September 1946 with the Dakota
- No. 232 Squadron RAF between 18 February and 30 March 1944 with the Spitfire IX
- No. 242 (Canadian) Squadron RAF between 18 February and 30 March 1944 with the Spitfire IX
- No. 243 Squadron RAF between 18 February and 30 March 1944 with the Spitfire IX
- No. 318 "City of Gdańsk" Polish Fighter-Reconnaissance Squadron RAF between 31 August and 10 September 1943 with the Hawker Hurricane I
- Detachment No. 451 Squadron RAAF between August 1943 and April 1944 with the Spitfire IX
- No. 459 Squadron RAAF between 17 and 25 February 1945 with the Martin Baltimore IV & V
- No. 500 (County of Kent) Squadron AAF between 12 September and 19 October 1945 with the Baltimore V

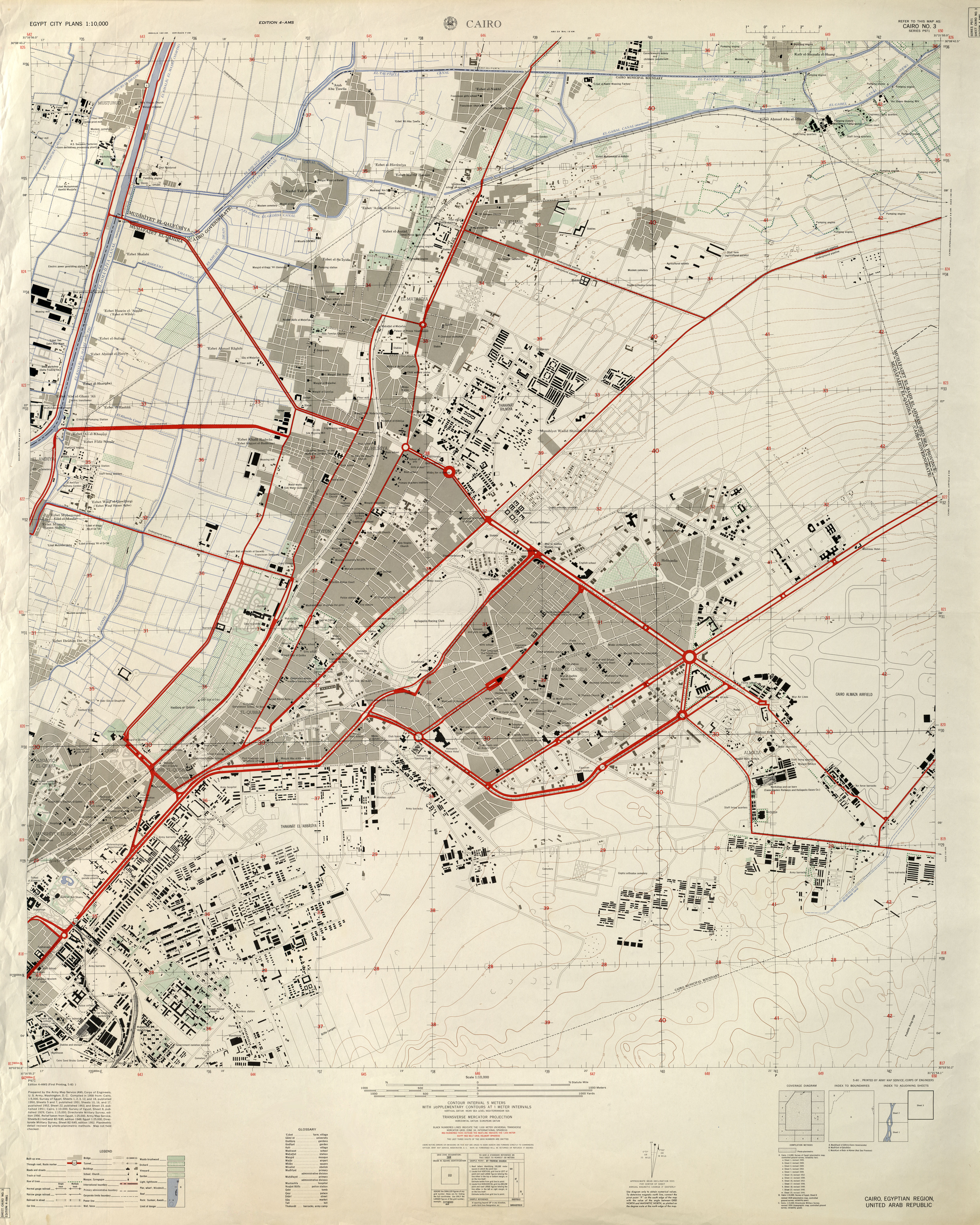
1958 Map of Cairo showing Almaza on the right

== Current use ==
The base is home to:

- 159 Air Division
  - 99 Squadron operating Beechcraft Super King Air 200, Gulfstream III, Gulfstream IV/IVSP, Gulfstream G400 & Dassault Falcon 7X
- 533 Air Wing (159 Air Division)
  - Air Navigation School operating EADS CASA C-295M & Antonov An-74T-200A
- 546 Air Wing (119 Air Division)
  - 7 (VIP) Squadron operating Sikorsky S-70A-21 & AgustaWestland AW189
  - 12 Squadron operating Westland Commando Mk1, Mk2B
  - 18 Squadron (SAR) operating Agusta A109EMS & AgustaWestland AW139
  - 21 Squadron operating S-70A-21
- Ministry of Health
  - SAR Unit operating AW139, A109E, Mil Mi-17, Mi-17V-5, Beechcraft 1900D & Cessna 680
- HQ EAF
  - 38 Squadron operating Beech 1900C-1

== See also ==
- List of North African airfields during World War II
