= No. 34 Squadron RAF =

Defunct flying squadron of the Royal Air Force

- Active: 7 January 1916 – 25 September 1919; 3 December 1935 – February 1942; 1 April 1942 – 15 October 1945; 1 August 1946 – 31 July 1947; 11 February 1949 – 24 June 1952; 1 August 1954 – 10 January 1958; 1 October 1960 – 31 December 1967
- Country: United Kingdom
- Branch: Royal Air Force
- Mottos: Latin: Lupus vult, lupus volat ("Wolf wishes, wolf flies")
- Battle honours: Western Front, 1916–17, Ypres, 1917, Italian Front & Adriatic, 1917–18, Somme, 1916, Hindenburg Line, Eastern Waters 1941, Malaya, 1941–42, Arakan, 1942–44, Manipur, 1944, Burma, 1944–45

Insignia
- Squadron badge heraldry: In front of an increscent, a wolf passant.
- Squadron codes: LB April–August 1939; EG March–October 1945; 8Q February 1949 – July 1951; 6J March 1949 – November 1952
- Post-1950 squadron roundel

No. 34 Squadron RAF was a squadron of the Royal Air Force. During the First World War it operated as a reconnaissance and bomber squadron and in the 1930s operated light bombers. It was re-equipped with fighter-bombers in the later half of the Second World War and in the post-war period was reformed four times; first as a photo-reconnaissance unit, then anti-aircraft co-operation, then as a jet fighter squadron through the 1950s. It was last active in the 1960s, as a Blackburn Beverley transport squadron.

== First World War ==
No. 34 Squadron RFC was formed at Castle Bromwich on 7 January 1916 from elements of No. 19 Squadron RFC. In early 1916, it was proposed that the squadron transfer to Beverley Aerodrome for the defence of Yorkshire against Zeppelin attacks, but this was not done, with a new squadron, 47 Squadron forming at Beverley in its place in March. 34 Squadron went to France in July 1916 as a reconnaissance unit equipped with Royal Aircraft Factory BE.2s, arriving at Allonville on 15 July, and starting operations on 19 July in support of III Corps during the Battle of the Somme. The squadron re-equipped with Royal Aircraft Factory RE.8s in January 1917, specialising in low-level operations as the Germans withdrew to the Hindenburg Line. The squadron was deployed to the north of the frontline in support of the British Fourth Army in preparation for the Battle of Passchendaele, where it was heavily engaged.

On 29 October 1917, as a result of the heavy defeat suffered by the Italians at the Battle of Caporetto, the squadron was pulled out of the front line in France and ordered to Italy as part of British efforts to reinforce the Italians. (Note: In total, three corps reconnaissance squadrons, 28, 34 and 42 Squadrons, all operating the RE.8, together with two Sopwith Camel-equipped fighter squadrons (45 and 66 Squadrons), were transferred to the Italian front.) It arrived at Milan on 14 November and carried out its first operation over the front, an attempted photo reconnaissance mission on 29 November. Duties included normal corps reconnaissance duties as well as bomber missions. The squadron was deployed in the Monte Grappa region in support of the Italian Fourth Army from July to September 1918, to compensate for a shortage of Italian aircraft. The squadron took part in the Battle of Vittorio Veneto from 27 October to 3 November, flying contact patrol missions to keep track of the location of advancing allied troops, and on one occasion dropping ammunition to British troops. The squadron remained in Italy after the end of the war, returning to Britain in April 1919 and disbanding at Old Sarum Airfield on 25 September 1919.

== 1935–45 ==
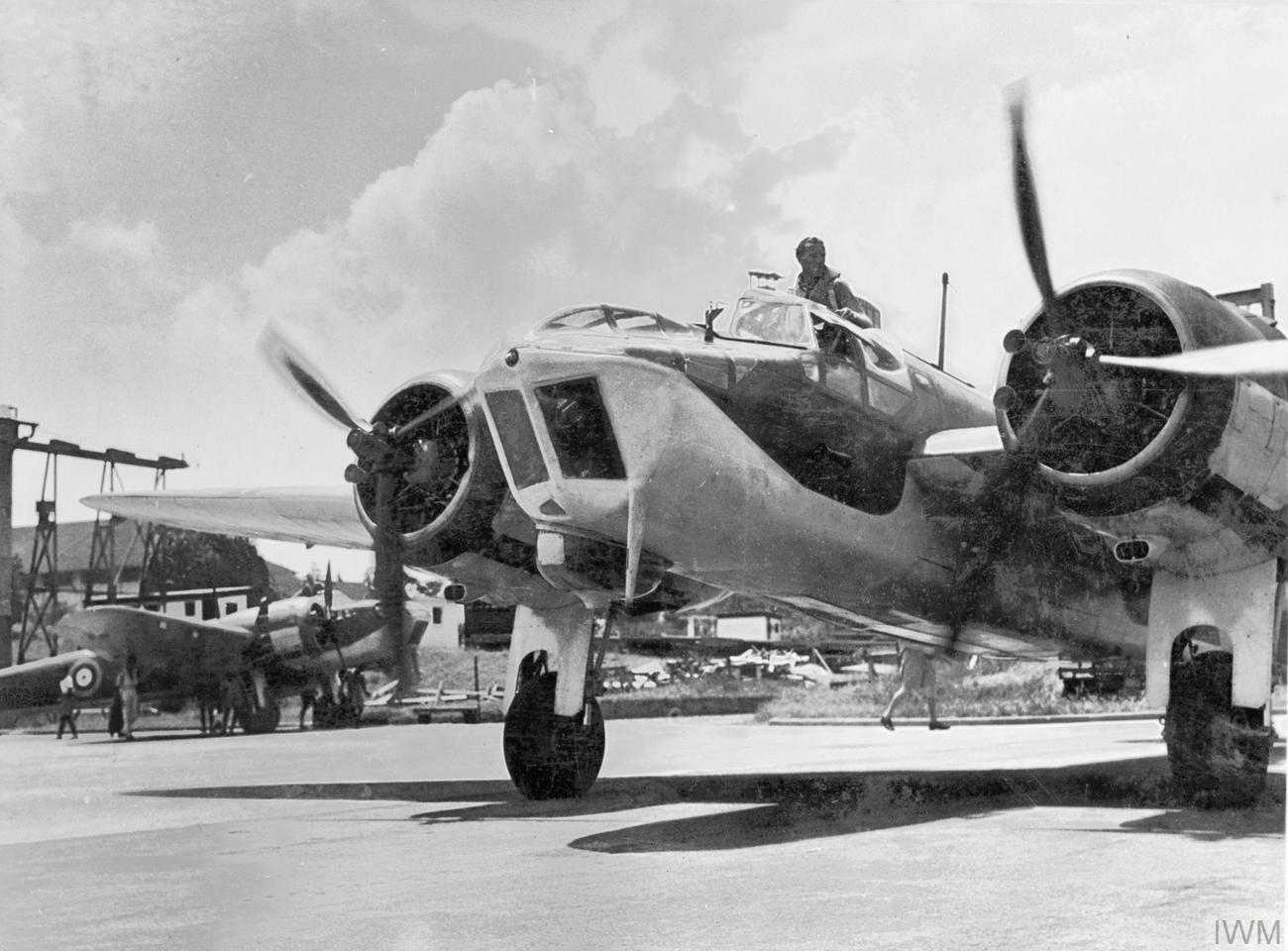
Bristol Blenheim Mk IV at RAF Tengah, Singapore, June 1941

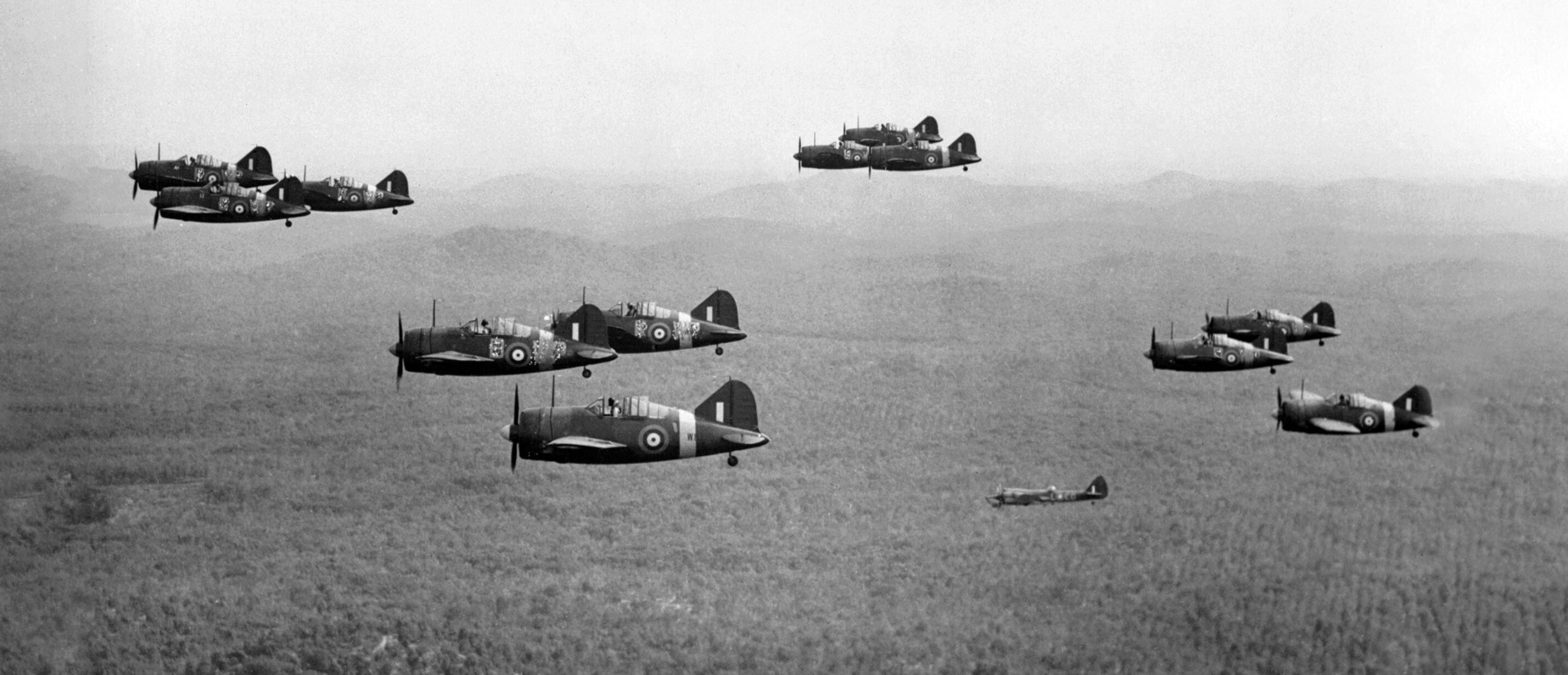
A single Bristol Blenheim Mark IV (lower right) accompanies a squadron of Brewster Buffaloes over the Malayan jungle, late 1941.

34 Squadron was re-formed at Bircham Newton on 3 December 1935, out of personnel from No. 18 Squadron RAF, and equipped with Hawker Hind light bombers. The squadron moved to RAF Abbotsinch (now Glasgow airport) on 30 July 1936, and joined the recently established 2 Group on 1 August. The squadron soon transferred to 1 Group, moving to RAF Lympne in Kent on 3 November 1936. It moved to RAF Upper Heyford on 11 July, reequipping with Bristol Blenheims that month. The squadron temporarily transferred to 2 Group in September 1938 as part of the RAF's mobilisation in response to the Munich crisis before returning to 1 Group in October. It rejoined 2 Group on 1 January 1939 and moved to RAF Watton on 22 February 1939. In August 1939, the squadron set out from Watton to reinforce British forces in the Far East, arriving at Singapore on 10 September, soon after the Second World War broke out in Europe.

In 1941, the squadron replaced its Blenheim Mark Is with more modern Mark IV Blenheims. On 8 December 1941, Japan invaded Malaya. The squadron flew its first combat operation of the Second World War that day, attacking Japanese landings at Kota Bharu. After two months, it had been withdrawn to Sumatra and Java and losses had been so severe that it was officially disbanded. The remaining personnel, aircraft and equipment were withdrawn to India.

It was officially re-formed on 1 April 1942 and re-equipped with Blenheims. In July and August, some of its aircraft were used to attack rebels in North West Frontier Province. From September until April 1943, the squadron carried out bombing raids against Japanese targets in Burma.

The squadron converted to the light ground attack role from November 1943, when it began to receive single-seat Hawker Hurricane fighter-bombers. These were replaced by Republic Thunderbolts in March 1945. 34 Squadron was disbanded on 15 October 1945.

== Post-war ==
On 1 August 1946 No. 681 Squadron RAF was renumbered as No. 34 Squadron, flying photo-reconnaissance Supermarine Spitfires until disbanding on 31 July 1947. No. 695 Squadron RAF was then renumbered to No. 34 Squadron on 11 February 1949 at Horsham St. Faith, near Norwich. They operated in anti-aircraft co-operation using Bristol Beaufighters and Spitfires until it too disbanded on 24 June 1952.

No. 34 was reformed at Tangmere with Gloster Meteor jets as a fighter squadron in August 1954. In October 1955 Hawker Hunters replaced the Meteors until disbandment on 10 January 1958. No. 34 was then reformed yet again on 1 October 1960 at RAF Seletar, Singapore, in the transport role with Blackburn Beverleys. In December 1962, four Blackburn Beverleys were used to insert Gurkhas into Brunei to combat a revolt by the North Kalimantan National Army (TNKU) against the Sultan of Brunei. The Squadron lasted until the end of 1967 when it was disbanded again.

== See also ==
- List of Royal Air Force aircraft squadrons
