= No. 76 Squadron RAF =

Defunct flying squadron of the Royal Air Force

- Active: 15 Sept 1916 – 1 April 1918 (RFC); 1 April 1918 – 13 June 1919 (RAF); 12 April 1937 – 8 April 1940; 30 April 1940 – 2 May 1940; 1 May 1941 – 1 September 1946; 9 Dec 1953 – 30 December 1960; 1 May 2007 – 20 May 2011
- Country: United Kingdom
- Branch: Royal Air Force
- Motto: Resolute

Commanders
- Notable commanders: Wing Commander Leonard Cheshire

Insignia
- Badge: In front of a rose, a lion passant, guardant.
- Squadron Codes: NM (Oct 1938 – Apr 1939); MP (May 1941 – Sep 1946)

Number 76 Squadron was a squadron of the Royal Air Force. It was formed during World War I as a home defence fighter squadron and in its second incarnation during World War II flew as a bomber squadron, first as an operational training unit and later as an active bomber squadron. With the end of the war the squadron converted to the role of transport squadron, to be reactivated shortly in the bomber role during the 1950s. From 2007 to 2011, it was a training unit, equipped with the Short Tucano at RAF Linton-on-Ouse.

== History ==
=== First World War ===
No. 76 Squadron, RFC was formed at RFC Ripon, Yorkshire for home defence duties on 15 September 1916 in the Yorkshire area, having detachments at Copmanthorpe, Helperby and Catterick. It was equipped with Royal Aircraft Factory B.E.2s and B.E.12s, these being replaced by Bristol F.2Bs in 1918. The squadron disbanded at Bramham Moor on 13 June 1919, having seen no action during this part of its service life.

=== Second World War ===
==== Wellesleys, Hampdens and Ansons ====
The squadron was next reformed at RAF Finningley in April 1937 from 'B' Flight of No. 7 Squadron, equipped with Vickers Wellesley bombers. These were replaced by Handley Page Hampdens and Avro Ansons in April 1939, the unit moving to RAF Upper Heyford at the outbreak of war. It performed an operational training role until April 1940, when it merged with No. 7 Squadron to form No. 16 Operational Training Unit (OTU).

==== Halifaxes ====
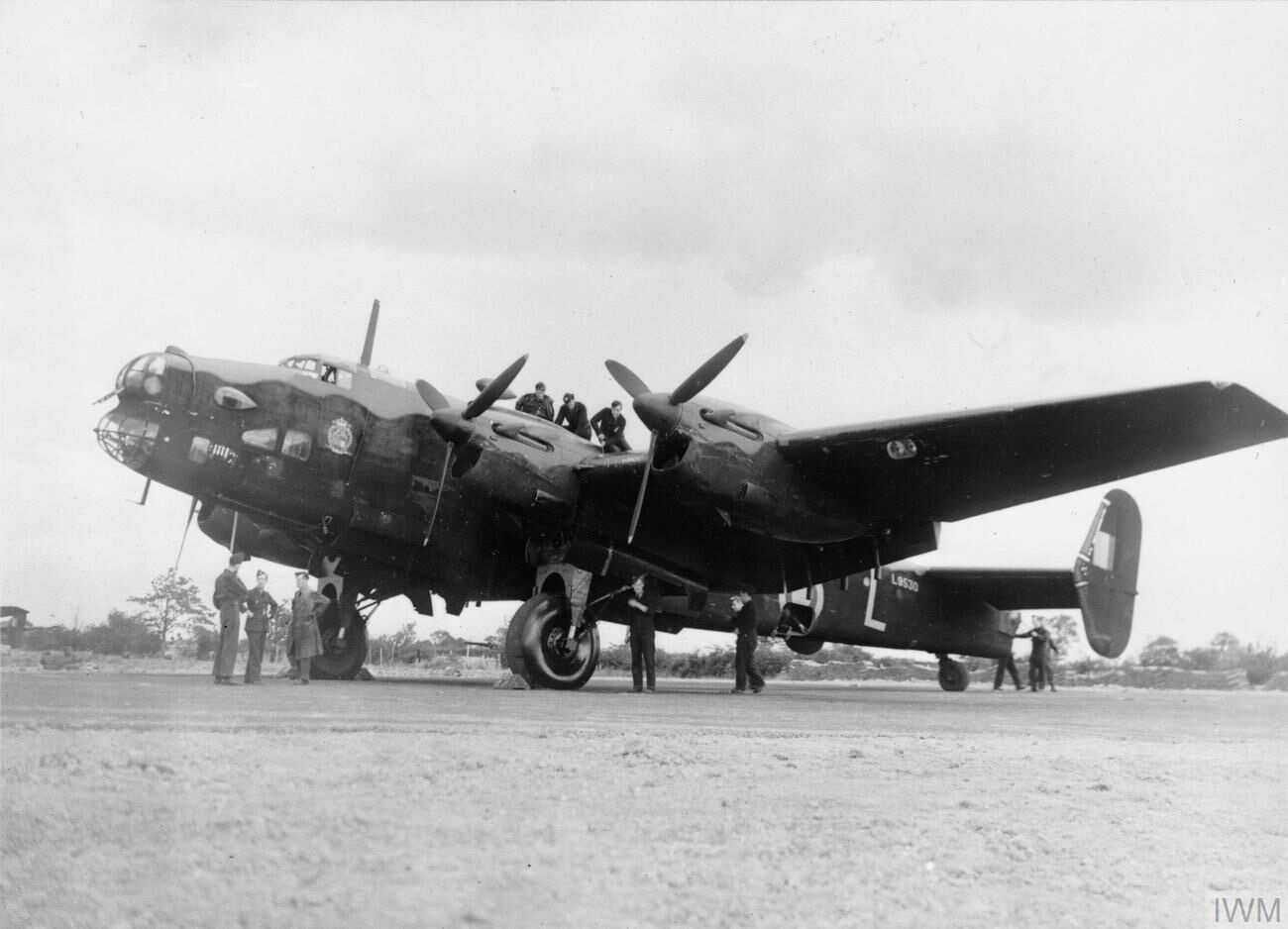
No. 76 Squadron Handley Page Halifax B.I at RAF Middleton St. George

No. 76 Squadron reformed shortly on 30 April 1940 at RAF West Raynham as a Hampden unit before being disbanded on 2 May 1940. On 1 May 1941, the squadron reformed properly at RAF Linton-on-Ouse as the second Handley Page Halifax bomber squadron, part of the newly created No. 4 Group, RAF Bomber Command. The Squadron moved to RAF Middleton St. George in June 1941, returning to Linton-on-Ouse in July 1942. The squadron moving again, this time to RAF Holme-on-Spalding Moor in June 1943 as part of a policy to allow the newly formed Canadian 6 Group to use the better equipped RAF stations that had been built pre-war. The Squadron had a substantial number of Norwegian pilots and aircrew.

From August 1942 to April 1943, No. 76 Squadron was commanded by Wing Commander Leonard Cheshire.

==== Dakotas ====
No. 76 Squadron was transferred to RAF Transport Command in May 1945, re-equipping with Douglas Dakotas, and moving to RAF Broadwell before moving on to India in September 1945. Twelve months later on 1 September 1946 it was disbanded at Palam Airport by being re-numbered to No. 62 Squadron.

=== Post-war ===
On 9 December 1953, No. 76 Squadron reformed at RAF Wittering, equipped with English Electric Canberra B.2 bombers. The squadron moved in November 1955 to RAF Weston Zoyland, for Operation Grapple. Some of these aircraft were tasked with collecting air samples during the Operation Grapple nuclear trials in 1956/58.

==== BRITISH NUCLEAR TESTS - CHRISTMAS ISLAND (Kiritimati) ====
The work of No. 76 Squadron on Christmas Island (also referred to as Kiritimati) in 1957 and 1958 is of particular note as they were tasked with flying through atomic and thermo-nuclear mushroom clouds, making several cuts at different altitudes, in order to collect information on the radioactivity after the bombs were detonated.

These megaton detonations were more powerful than those dropped on Hiroshima (15 kilotons) and Nagasaki (21 kilotons).

The nuclear cloud sampling missions were achieved through the use of specially adapted Canberra B6 aircraft - identified as Sniff Boss, Sniff 1, Sniff 2, Sniff 3, and Sniff 4 – which focused on measuring Gamma radiation. The instruments carried by each sampling aircraft were Sample Strength Indicator (Salmon), Dose Rate Meter (Romeo), Integrating Dose Meter (Charlie), a personal Quartz Fibre Dosimeter and a Personal Film Badge Dosimeter.

When asked what a radioactive cloud feels like the pilots replied ‘Like smog over Manchester.”

===== OPERATION GRAPPLE Y – April 28, 1958 | 3 Megaton (3000 kiloton) =====
RAF 76 Squadron members flew through Britain’s largest thermonuclear explosion ‘officially’ recorded at 3 megaton ( 3000 kilotons)

- Canberra B6 WJ 754 – Sniff Boss: Flew through the cloud 21 minutes after detonation at 42,000 ft. They made 2 passes through the cloud for about 1 minute each.
- Canberra B6 WJ 757 – Sniff One: Flew through the cloud 45 minutes after detonation at 46,000 ft. “Sniff One was subsequently proved to have slightly exceeded his and the squadron was thus faced with the unfortunate need to replace 2 crews instead of the one philosophically accepted as ‘expendable’
- Canberra B6 WH980 – Sniff Two: Entered the cloud 51 minutes after detonation at 52,800 feet. Made a second cut into the cloud at 1 hour and 5 minutes at 50,000 feet for 5 minutes. “Sniff Two obviously struck the ‘hottest’ zone and some slightly exceeded his maximum permitted dose in the course of only 1 penetration”
- Canberra B6 WH 976 – Sniff Three: Did not sample cloud due to problem with sampling equipment.
- Canberra B6 WH 978 – Sniff Four: Made 3 cuts through the cloud with the first cut 1 hour and 46 minutes after detonation and the last cut 2 hours and 24 minutes after detonation

===== OPERATION GRAPPLE ZULU ‘ PENNANT’ – August 22, 1958 | 24 kilotons =====
- Canberra B6 WJ 757 - Sniff Boss: Entered the cloud 12 minutes after detonation for 10 seconds at 34,000 feet.
- Canberra B6 WH979 - Sniff One: Entered the cloud 18 minutes after detonation at 18 minutes at 32,000 feet. A second pass was made 6 minutes later at 25,000 feet.
- Canberra B6 WJ754 – Sniff Two: Entered cloud 31 minutes after detonation at 19,000 feet. Three more cuts were made into the cloud at 9,000 feet, 11,000 feet, and 21,000 feet. The last cut into the cloud was made 54 minutes after detonation at 22,000 feet.
- Canberra B6 WH978 – Sniff Three Did not sample cloud.

===== OPERATION GRAPPLE ZULU ‘FLAGPOLE’ – September 2nd, 1958 | 1 Megaton (1000 kiloton) =====
- Canberra B6 WJ 757 – Sniff Boss: Penetrated cloud 19 minutes after detonation at 42,000 feet. Penetrated the cloud a second time 5 minutes later at a height of 44,000 feet.
- Canberra B6 WH 979 – Sniff One: Penetrated the stem of the cloud 33 minutes after detonation at 47,000 feet. A second cut into the cloud was made at 50,000 feet.
- Canberra B6 WJ 754 – Sniff Two: Penetrated the cloud 43 minutes after detonation at 51,000 feet.
- Canberra B6 WH 976 – Sniff Three: Made SIX cuts through the cloud at 54,000 feet between 87 minutes and 119 minutes after detonation.

OPERATION GRAPPLE ZULU ‘HALLIARD’ – September 11, 1958 | 800 Kilotons

- Canberra B6 WJ 757 – Sniff Boss: Sampled cloud 20 minutes after detonation – spent 40 seconds in cloud.
- Canberra B6 WH 980 – Sniff One: Penetrated the cloud at 53,200 feet for SEVEN MINUTES.
- Canberra B6 WJ 754 – Sniff Two: Sampled the cloud 45 minutes after detonation at 54,100 feet.
- Canberra B6 WH 979– Sniff Three: Sampled the cloud for TWELVE MINUTES “Nic McLellan reports in his book, Grappling with the Bomb, that Christopher Donne had entered a “cut” in the cloud as the Canberra rose. His navigator panicked and expressed his opinion to abandon the cloud, but they were unable to leave due to the turbulence, and with the instruments resting against their maximum stops. On landing, the crew were decontaminated and Donne was told to return to the UK due to receiving an excessive level of radiation”

===== OPERATION GRAPPLE ZULU ‘BURGEE’ – September 23, 1958 | 25 kilotons =====
- Canberra B6 WH 979 – Sniff Boss: Sampled cloud 15 minutes after detonation with a shallow cut of 15 seconds.
- Canberra B6 WJ 754 – Sniff One: Sampled cloud 24 minutes after detonation at 42,000 feet for 20 seconds. Sampled again 1000 feet higher for 15 seconds.
- Canberra B6 WH 976 – Sniff Two: Sampled cloud 42 minutes after detonation at 35,000 feet. Made 5 further cuts through the same patch of cloud.
- Canberra B6 WH 980 – Sniff Three: Did not sample cloud.

There were usually 3 crew members in each aeroplane - but sometimes in Sniff Boss there was a 4th crew member who had medical knowledge.

Crew members were limited to being exposed to 10r (Roentgen_(unit)) of radiation, however there are records which indicate that some crew members were exposed to much greater amounts of radiation – up to three times the amount. There is much discussion about the impact that these missions had on the health of these servicemen in addition to the health of their offspring – in particular from genetic damage.

All RAF 76 Squadron members who went to Christmas Island were required to have their blood tested as per Bomber Command Operation Order No. 2/ 58. Some members of RAF 76 Squadron involved in the British Nuclear Tests had their blood and urine tested for radioactive materials such as Stronium-90, Iodine-131, and Tritium.

The squadron disbanded on 30 December 1960 at RAF Upwood.

After 60+ years, in November 2022 the British government announced a medal to recognise the work of the British Nuclear Test Veterans. However, it is not a military campaign medal as the Ministry of Defence does not consider there was enough ‘risk and rigour’ involved on the Cold War work of the British Nuclear Test Veterans.

=== Training ===
The squadron remained dormant until 1 May 2007, when the Short Tucano T.1 Air Navigation Squadron at RAF Linton-on-Ouse was redesignated as No. 76 (Reserve) Squadron. In 2008, Prince William spent three months at Linton learning to fly. No. 76 Squadron continued to train WSOs (Weapons Systems Officers) until December 2010, and was disbanded in May 2011.

== Aircraft operated ==
Aircraft operated include:

- Royal Aircraft Factory B.E.2c (September 1916 – 1917)
- Royal Aircraft Factory B.E.2e (December 1916 – August 1918)
- Royal Aircraft Factory B.E.12 (September 1916 – August 1918)
- Royal Aircraft Factory B.E.12a (December 1916 – August 1918)
- Airco DH.6 (September 1916 – 1917)
- Royal Aircraft Factory R.E.8 (May 1917 – July 1918)
- Royal Aircraft Factory B.E.12b (March 1918 – August 1918)
- Bristol F.2b (July 1918 – August 1918)
- Avro 504K (August 1918 – May 1919)
- Vickers Wellesley (April 1937 – April 1939)
- Handley Page Hampden Mk.I (March 1939 – April 1940)
- Avro Anson Mk.I (May 1939 – April 1940)
- Handley Page Halifax B.I (May 1941 – March 1942)
- Handley Page Halifax B.II (October 1941 – April 1943)
- Handley Page Halifax B.V (February 1943 – February 1944)
- Handley Page Halifax B.III (January 1944 – April 1945)
- Handley Page Halifax B.VI (March 1945 – May 1945)
- Douglas Dakota Mk.IV (May 1945 – September 1946)
- English Electric Canberra B.2 (December 1953 – December 1955)
- English Electric Canberra B.6 (December 1955 – December 1960)
- Short Tucano T.1 (May 2007 – May 2011)
