= RAF Ripon =

Royal Air Force base in Yorkshire, England

RAF Ripon RFC Ripon
- Ripon, North Yorkshire in England
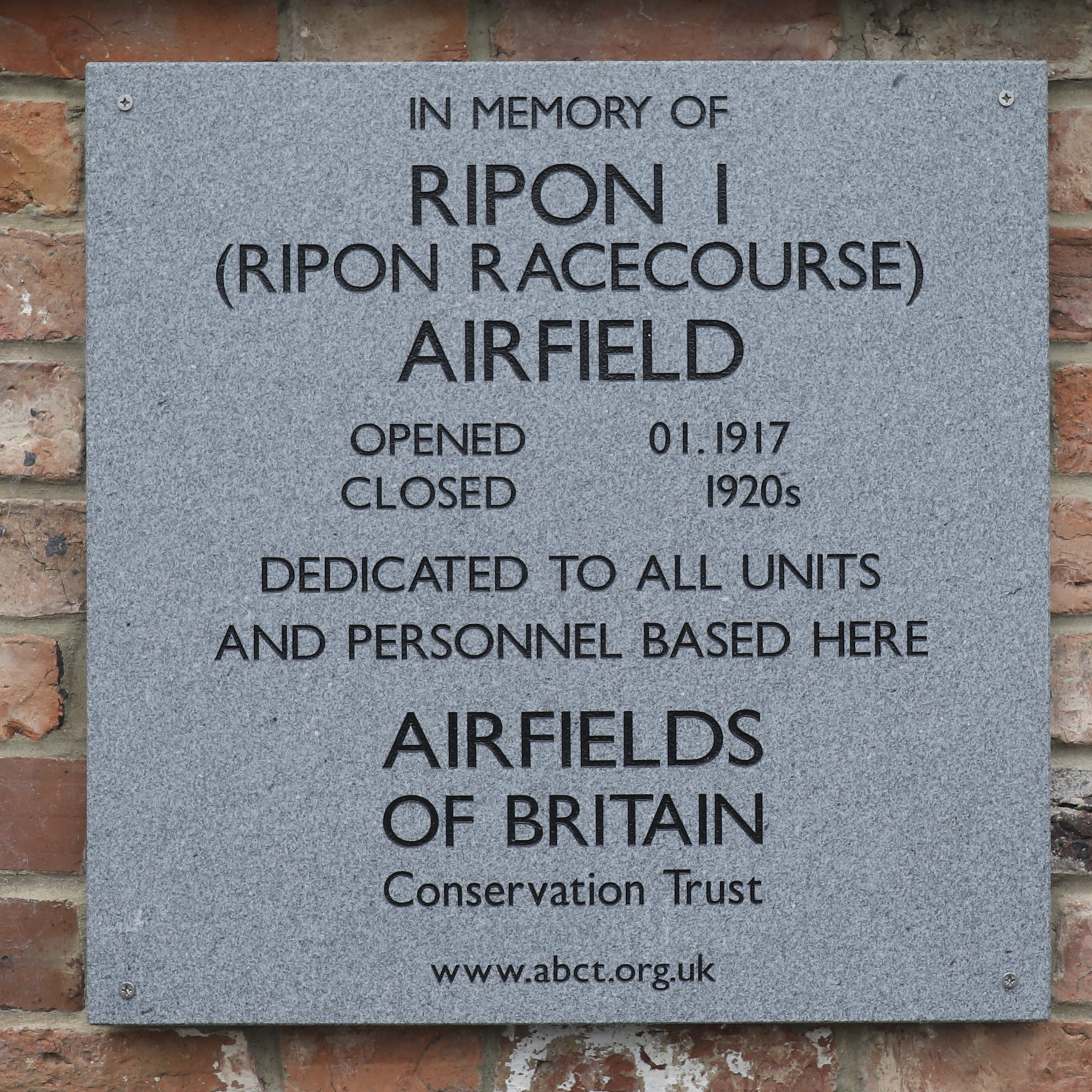
- The plaque at Ripon Racecourse. This is affixed to the oldest building at the racecourse.

Site information
- Type: Home Defence (HD) airfield
- Owner: Air Ministry
- Condition: Open as racecourse

Location
- Location within North Yorkshire
- Coordinates: 54°07′06.6″N 1°29′49.4″W
- Area: 81 acres (33 ha)

Site history
- Built: 1916
- In use: 1919

Garrison information
- Occupants: No. 79 Squadron RAF; No. 189 Squadron RAF

Airfield information
Runways
Direction	Length and surface
	Grass

Royal Air Force Ripon (also known as Royal Flying Corps Ripon) was a First World War airfield maintained by the Royal Flying Corps in the city of Ripon, North Yorkshire, England. The airfield was home to No. 76 Squadron which was employed on Home Defence (HD) in the United Kingdom. The airfield was created when the Royal Flying Corps (RFC) commandeered the southern half of Ripon Racecourse in 1916. After the end of the First World War, the airfield was returned to horse-racing.

== History ==
In 1916, the southern part of Ripon Racecourse, only 2 miles (3.2 km) south-east of the city of Ripon, was pressed into service as a base for No. 76 Squadron RFC. No. 76 Squadron was employed on Home Defence duties and had individual flights located at Catterick, Copmanthorpe, and Helperby, with Ripon acting as the headquarters. Other landing grounds could be used in an emergency (RAF Manywells Height), though in practice, lesser used locations saw very little activity (if any). As with the other landing grounds in Yorkshire, the site at Ripon was quite compact, covering only 81 acres (33 ha) with basic facilities. The role of 76 Squadron at the base was in countering any German threats from air, most notably the Zeppelin airships that would try bombing runs across the north.

In 1917, No. 189 Squadron formed at RFC Ripon as a night training squadron and its stay at the airfield was short (only 5 months) before moving south to Suttons Farm. On 1 April 1918, the Royal Air Force was formed from the RFC and the Royal Naval Air Service. RFC Ripon was changed to Royal Air Force Ripon, though this name would only exist for 11 months.

No. 76 Squadron moved to Tadcaster in March 1919 and was disbanded there just three months later. The airfield at Ripon was returned to the racecourse owners. Even after this, the portion of the racecourse to the south was used to land civilian flights including Sir Alan Cobham's Circus in the 1920s. The site was re-used during the Second World War as a Prisoner of War (PoW) camp.

During the Second World War, RAF Dishforth, some 4 miles (6.4 km) to the east of Ripon was also commonly known as RAF Ripon due to its proximity to the town, but this was a purely unofficial name. The town also had another civilian airfield, due south of the city, that existed briefly in the 1920s.
