= RAF Doncaster =

Royal Air Force base in Yorkshire, England

RAF Doncaster
- Doncaster, South Yorkshire in England

Site information
- Type: Royal Air Force satellite station
- Owner: Air Ministry
- Operator: Royal Air Force
- Controlled by: RAF Bomber Command * No. 93 Group RAF

Location
- Shown within South Yorkshire RAF Doncaster (the United Kingdom)
- Coordinates: 53°30′50″N 001°06′36″W

Site history
- Built: 1916
- In use: January 1916 – 1954
- Battles/wars: First World War; European theatre of World War II

Airfield information
- Elevation: 8 metres (26 ft) AMSL
Runways
Direction	Length and surface
05/23	825 metres (2,707 ft) Grass
00/00	Grass
00/00	Sommerfeld Tracking

Royal Air Force Doncaster or more simply RAF Doncaster, also referred to as Doncaster Aerodrome, is a former Royal Air Force satellite station near Doncaster, South Yorkshire, England.

== The first aviation meeting in England ==
In 1909, Doncaster and specifically Doncaster Racecourse was chosen as the venue for an airshow, after the world's first international air display in Rheims in 1908. Around a dozen aviators were present, the most famous being Léon Delagrange, and Roger Sommer. Samuel Cody in an attempt to win a prize offered by The Daily Mail for the first British pilot in a British aeroplane to fly a circular mile signed British naturalisation papers in front of the crowd with the band playing both the Star Spangled Banner and the National Anthem. Unfortunately, he crashed his airplane on the first day of the meeting and made no significant flights.

Artist Dudley Hardy drew caricatures of participating flyers, Captain Sir Walter Windham, Léon Delagrange, Hubert Le Blon, Louis Schreck, Roger Sommer and Samuel Cody, for the show's souvenir programme, together with Wilbur Wright and Louis Bleriot, who did not participate.

== First World War ==
During the First World War Royal Flying Corps fighters were first based at Doncaster Racecourse, then at a temporary airstrip near Finningley (later RAF Finningley and now Doncaster Sheffield Airport) and finally in 1916, at a newly built airfield beside the racecourse. This station had 3 main flight sheds on the flight line with support buildings behind backing onto Grand Stand Road. Station fighters were deployed to defend the east coast against Zeppelins, and used in the training of pilots for the war in France. Within months of the war ending the entire station was put up for sale and two of its three Belfast hangars, (the same type of hangar forming the basis for the Royal Air Force Museum at Hendon), were sold to a Sheffield motor manufacturing company for storage and assembly at Finningley. One-third of the hangars stayed in place, mainly housing buses, until the 1970s when they were demolished and replaced with modern, non-aerodrome related buildings.

=== Aircraft ===
The following aircraft were stationed at RAF Doncaster throughout the period 1916-1919:

- Royal Aircraft Factory B.E.2c (1916–1919)
- Royal Aircraft Factory S.E.5a (1916–1919)
- Avro 504K (1916–1919)
- Sopwith Cuckoo (1917–1919)

== Aviation Centre ==
In 1920 the Government asked local authorities to assist in the formation of a chain of airfields so that the country would not lag behind other nations in the provision of civil air services. Consequently, on 26 May 1934, Doncaster, with advice from Alan Cobham, opened an Aviation Centre. Development of the airfield continued and on 1 July 1936 an international service was open to Amsterdam.

On 18 November 1938, after discussions with the Air Ministry, No. 616 Squadron RAF of the Auxiliary Air Force was formed. Shortly after the outbreak of war in 1939 the Squadron took part in the Battle of Britain. It was the first to be equipped with the Gloster Meteor in 1944. After the departure of 616 Squadron, the station was left with No. 271 Squadron RAF, composed mainly of requisitioned civilian aircraft and obsolete twin-engined bombers. It was re-equipped with Douglas Dakotas after which it was re-based in Southern England to take part in Operation Overlord. For his actions during the Squadron's part in the airborne invasion at Arnhem, Flight Lieutenant David Lord was awarded a posthumous Victoria Cross.

== Units ==
The following units were here at some point:

- No. 7 Squadron RAF
- No. 9 Reserve Flying School RAF (November 1947 – June 1954)
- No. 18 Operational Training Unit RAF (June 1943)
- No. 24 Gliding School RAF (February 1948 – March 1951)
- No. 29 Gliding School RAF (May 1946 – March 1948)
- No. 47 Elementary and Reserve Flying Training School RAF (July – September 1939)
- Detachment of No. 91 (Forward) Staging Post (January – February 1944)
- No. 92 (Forward) Staging Post (January 1944)
- No. 169 Squadron RAF
- No. 271 Squadron RAF
- No. 613 Squadron RAF
- No. 658 Squadron RAF
- 809 Naval Air Squadron
- No. 2763 Squadron RAF Regiment
- Dakota Modification Centre (March – October 1944)
- Sparrow (Ambulance) Flight (August 1943 – June 1944)
- Squadron & Flight Commanders School (July – November 1945)

== Post Second World War ==
After the war, the airfield reverted to civilian flying and finally closed in 1992. The last original RAF buildings on the airfield now house the South Yorkshire Aircraft Museum (formerly known as AeroVenture) and the Yorkshire Helicopter Preservation Group.
