= Royal Aircraft Factory F.E.7 =

General information
- Type: Long-range bomber
- National origin: British
- Manufacturer: Royal Aircraft Factory
- Status: Project abandoned

History
- Developed from: Royal Aircraft Factory F.E.4

The Royal Aircraft Factory F.E.7 was a design project based on the company's F.E.4, except the F.E.7 was intended to be a two-seater, as well as a long-range bomber.

== Design and development ==
The F.E.7 was powered by two Rolls-Royce pusher engines, each generating 250 horsepower (186 kW). These were mounted within the fuselage and drove the propellers by means of gears and shafts. It was armed with a Coventry Ordnance Works one-pounder gun, and a few Lewis machine guns. However, the project was abandoned.

== Specifications ==
Data from

General characteristics

- Wingspan: 20.65 m (67 ft 9 in)
- Powerplant: 2 × Rolls-Royce pusher, 190 kW (250 hp) each

Armament

- Guns: 1x One-pounder C.O.W. gun + 2x Lewis machine guns

== Bibliography ==
- Hare, Paul R. (1990). The Royal Aircraft Factory. London: Putnam Aeronautical Books. ISBN 0-85177-843-7.
