= RAF 4 =

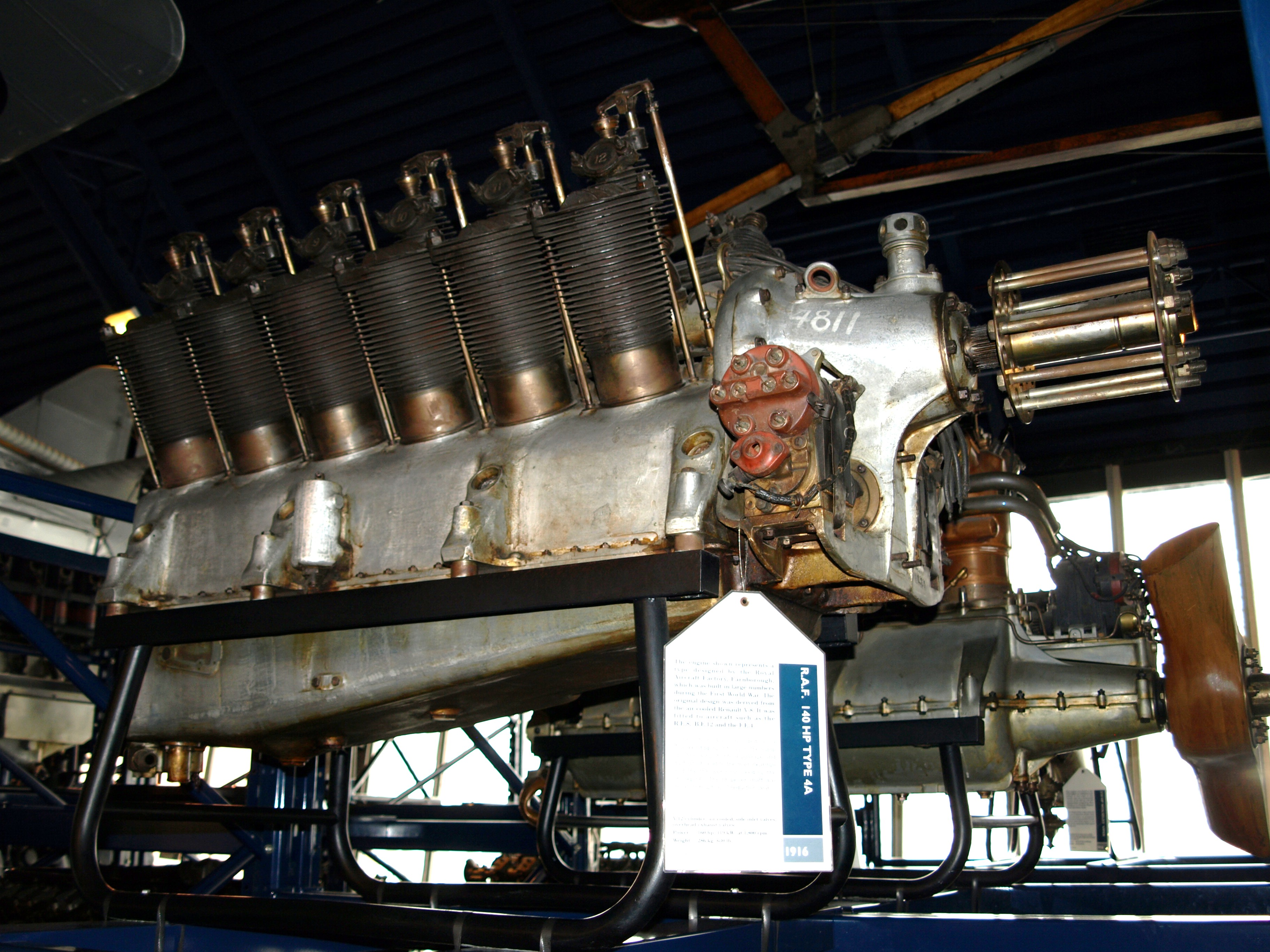
- Preserved RAF 4a engine at the Science Museum (London)
- Type: Piston inline aero engine
- Manufacturer: Royal Aircraft Factory
- Designer: A.J. Rowledge
- First run: December 1914
- Major applications: Royal Aircraft Factory R.E.8
- Number built: >3,600
- Developed from: RAF 1

The RAF 4 is a British air-cooled, V12 engine developed for aircraft use during World War I. Based on the eight–cylinder RAF 1 it was designed by the Royal Aircraft Factory but produced by the two British companies of Daimler and Siddeley-Deasy. The RAF 5 was a pusher version of the same engine.

== Turbocharger ==
A turbocharged experimental version of the RAF 4, the RAF 4d, was developed using a Rateau exhaust-driven turbocharger. The engine was test-flown in a R.E.8, but the turbocharging experiments were abandoned after the turbine failed on 4 May 1918.

== Variants ==
RAF 4
1914 - Prototype engine, 140 horsepower (104 kW).
RAF 4a
1917 - Main production variant, 150 horsepower (112 kW). 3,608 built.
RAF 4d
1916 - 180 horsepower (134 kW), experimental supercharger installation. 16 built.
RAF 4e
1917 - 240 horsepower (180 kW), strengthened cylinders and enlarged valves.
RAF 5
1915 - 150 horsepower (112 kW), pusher version with fan-cooling.
RAF 5b
170 horsepower (127 kW), increased bore version of RAF 5.

== Applications ==
=== RAF 4 ===
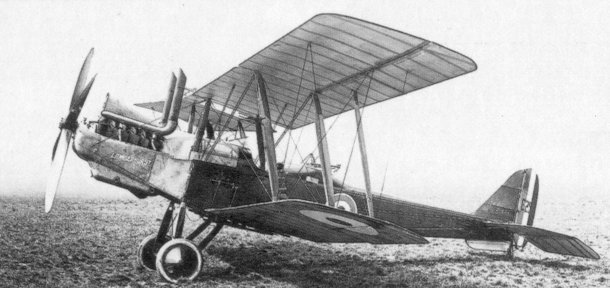
The Royal Aircraft Factory R.E.8

- Armstrong Whitworth F.K.8
- Bristol F.2 Fighter
- Royal Aircraft Factory B.E.12
- Royal Aircraft Factory R.E.7
- Royal Aircraft Factory R.E.8
- Siddeley-Deasy R.T.1
- Vickers F.B.14

=== RAF 5 ===
- Royal Aircraft Factory F.E.2
- Royal Aircraft Factory F.E.4

== Engines on display ==
A preserved RAF 4a engine is on public display at the Science Museum (London).

== Specifications (RAF 4a) ==
Data from Lumsden

=== General characteristics ===
- Type: 12-cylinder, upright, 60-degree Vee engine
- Bore: 3.94 in (100 mm)
- Stroke: 5.51 in (140 mm)
- Displacement: 806.15 cu in (13.2 L)
- Dry weight: 680 lb (308 kg)

=== Components ===
- Valvetrain: EOI (side-valve inlet, exhaust overhead)
- Fuel system: Twin Claudel-Hobson Mk.1A carburettors
- Cooling system: Air-cooled
- Reduction gear: 0.5:1, Left-hand tractor

=== Performance ===
- Power output: 163 hp (122 kW) at 1,800 rpm (takeoff power)
- Specific power: 0.2 hp/cu in (9.2 kW/L)
- Compression ratio: 4.3:1
- Power-to-weight ratio: 0.24 hp/lb (0.4 kW/kg)

== See also ==
Related development

- RAF 1

Comparable engines

- Rolls-Royce Falcon

Related lists

- List of aircraft engines
