= Pithey =

Pithey is a surname. Notable people with the surname include:

- Croye Pithey (1895–1920), South African World War I flying ace
- David Pithey (1936–2018), Rhodesian cricketer
- Jack William Pithey (1903–1984), Rhodesian politician
- Tony Pithey (1933–2006), Rhodesian cricketer
- Wensley Pithey (1914–1993), South African-born British actor
