= Siddeley-Deasy R.T.1 =

R.T.1

General information
- Type: Reconnaissance
- National origin: United Kingdom
- Manufacturer: Siddeley-Deasy
- Designer: John Lloyd
- Number built: 3

History
- First flight: Late 1917
- Developed from: Royal Aircraft Factory R.E.8

The Siddeley Deasy R.T.1 was designed in 1917 as a R.E.8 replacement. Like the R.E.8, it was a two-seat single-engined biplane built for reconnaissance work.

== Development ==
During World War I, the car makers Siddeley-Deasy had been one of several manufacturers of the Royal Aircraft Factory R.E.8. Though this aircraft was produced in large numbers, it was rumoured that the upper wing could fail in dives and that its spinning characteristics were dangerous. The R.T.1, the first of Siddeley Deasy's own designs set out to answer these criticisms in an aircraft of better performance.

The main difference between the R.T.1 and the R.E.8 was in the wings, which were completely new. The large overhang of the R.E.8's upper wing, the source of the structural concerns, was gone and the R.T.1 was a two bay biplane with equal span constant chord wings, though the lower ones were significantly narrower than the upper. There were only small changes to the R.E.8 fuselage: the decking aft of the gunner, together with his gun-ring were raised, and the fin and rudder were larger and more rounded.

Only three R.T.1s were built, differing chiefly in their engines. The first and third were powered by a 200 hp (150 kW) Hispano-Suiza and the second by the 150 hp (110 kW) RAF 4A also used in the R.E.8. The Hispano-Suiza installations differed in their nose and radiator arrangements: the first used a rectangular nose radiator like that of the S.E.5, whereas the third had a neatly rounded nose with a small chin radiator. The ailerons on the third aircraft were extended beyond the wing-tips to allow horn balancing.

Direct comparisons of the RAF 4A powered R.T.1 and the R.E.8 showed the former had much the same top speed but better climb and ceiling because of its lower wing loading. The more powerful engine in the third R.T.1 increased the speed by some 10 mph (16 mph) and the ceiling by 2000 ft over the second machine.

The R.T.1 flew well and one went for service trials on the Front, the other two going to training units, but with the war at its end there was no chance of further orders.

== Specifications (Third aircraft) ==
Data from Armstrong Whitworth Aircraft since 1913

General characteristics

- Crew: 2
- Length: 27 ft 8 in (8.43 m)
- Wingspan: 41 ft 9 in (12.73 m)
- Height: 11 ft 7 in (3.53 m)
- Wing area: 433 sq ft (40.2 m^{2})
- Empty weight: 1,803 lb (818 kg)
- Gross weight: 2,707 lb (1,228 kg)
- Fuel capacity: 37.5 imp gal (45.0 US gal; 170 L)
- Powerplant: 1 × Hispano-Suiza 8 water-cooled V-8 engine, 200 hp (150 kW)

Performance

- Maximum speed: 108 mph (174 km/h, 94 kn) at 10,000 ft (3,000 m)
- Service ceiling: 18,000 ft (5,500 m)
- Rate of climb: 540 ft/min (2.7 m/s)

Armament

- Guns:
  - 1× forward-firing Lewis gun mounted above upper wing
  - 1× Lewis gun on scarff ring in rear cockpit
