= Royal Aircraft Factory R.E.8 =

Royal Aircraft Factory First World War reconnaissance biplane

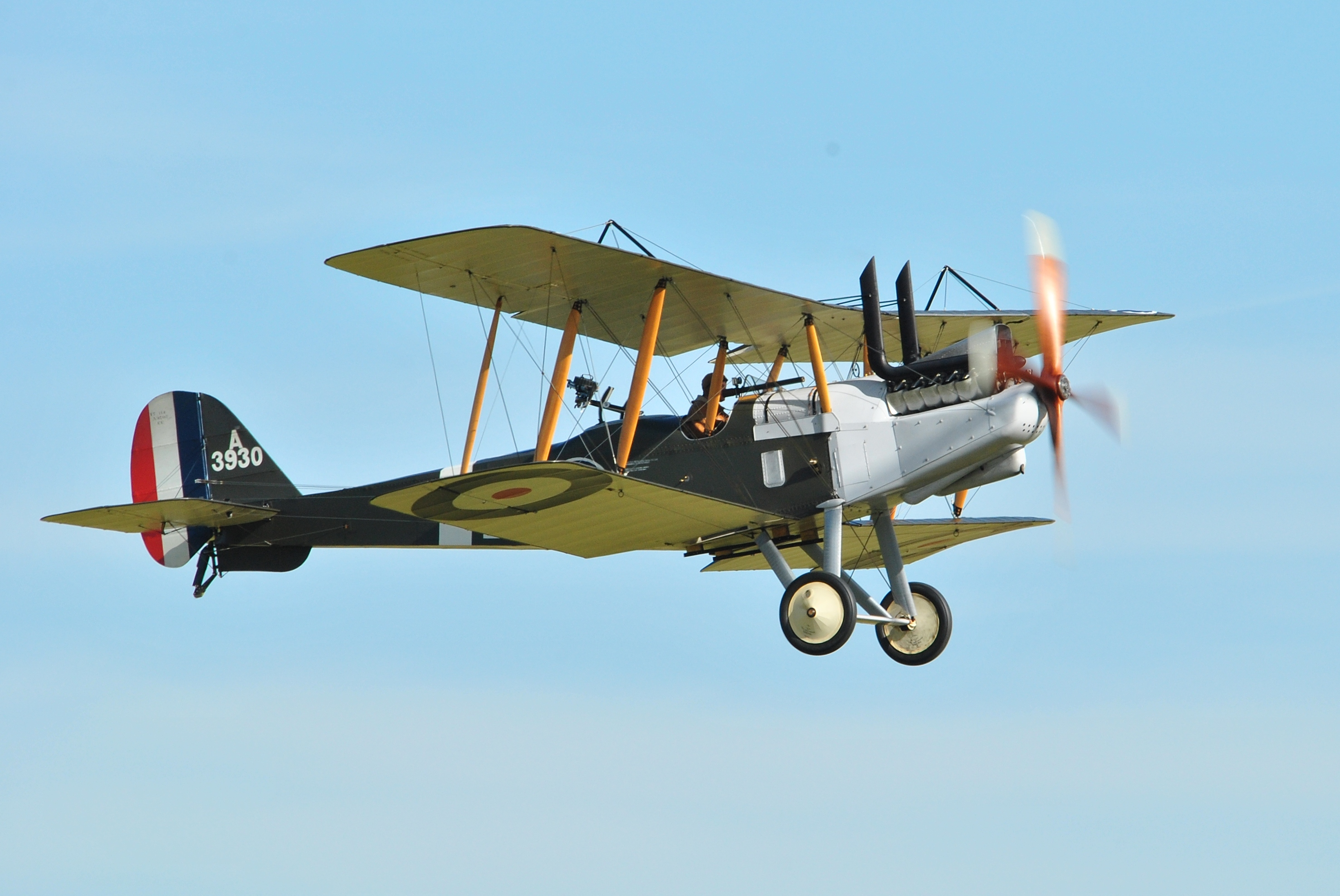
- A vintage R.E.8 performing over the Duxford Jubilee Airshow 2012

General information
- Type: Reconnaissance, Bomber
- Manufacturer: Royal Aircraft Factory
- Designer: John Kenworthy / Walter Barling
- Status: Retired
- Primary users: RFC/RAF Australian Flying Corps; Aviation Militaire Belge
- Number built: 4,077

History
- Manufactured: 1916–1918
- Introduction date: 1916
- First flight: 17 June 1916
- Retired: 1918
- Variant: Siddeley-Deasy R.T.1

The Royal Aircraft Factory R.E.8 is a British two-seat biplane reconnaissance and bomber aircraft of the First World War that was designed and produced at the Royal Aircraft Factory. It was also built under contract by Austin Motors, Daimler, Standard Motors, Siddeley-Deasy and the Coventry Ordnance Works.

Intended as a replacement for the vulnerable B.E.2, the R.E.8 was widely regarded as more difficult to fly and gained a reputation in the Royal Flying Corps for being "unsafe" that was never entirely dispelled. Although eventually it gave reasonably satisfactory service, it was never an outstanding combat aircraft. Nonetheless, it remained the standard British reconnaissance and artillery observation aircraft from mid-1917 to the end of the war, serving alongside the rather more popular Armstrong Whitworth F.K.8.

More than 4,000 R.E.8s were eventually produced; these aircraft saw service in a range of different theatres, including Italy, Russia, Palestine and Mesopotamia, as well as the Western Front. The R.E.8 was rapidly withdrawn from service after the end of the war, by which time it was regarded as totally obsolete.

== Development ==
=== Background ===
Design of the new type had begun in late 1915, so that it was conceptually at least almost contemporary with the B.E.12 and the B.E.2e – like these earlier types, it was designed for inherent stability in line with the dominant pre-war belief in the necessity of stability to perform the aerial observation role.

The B.E.2 had already been subject to considerable criticism, and a deliberate effort was made to address each of the earlier type's failings. In particular, the more powerful motor was intended to improve the feeble speed and climb of the B.E.2 and to allow a better payload; this permitted the type to operate as a true two-seater: the observer no longer had to be left behind when bombs or a full fuel load were carried. There was no need for his seat to be at the centre of gravity; seated behind the pilot, instead of in front as in the B.E.2, he was in the proper position to operate a machine-gun. Another consequence of the additional engine power was the possibility of fitting a forward-mounted gun for the pilot.

=== Design and testing ===
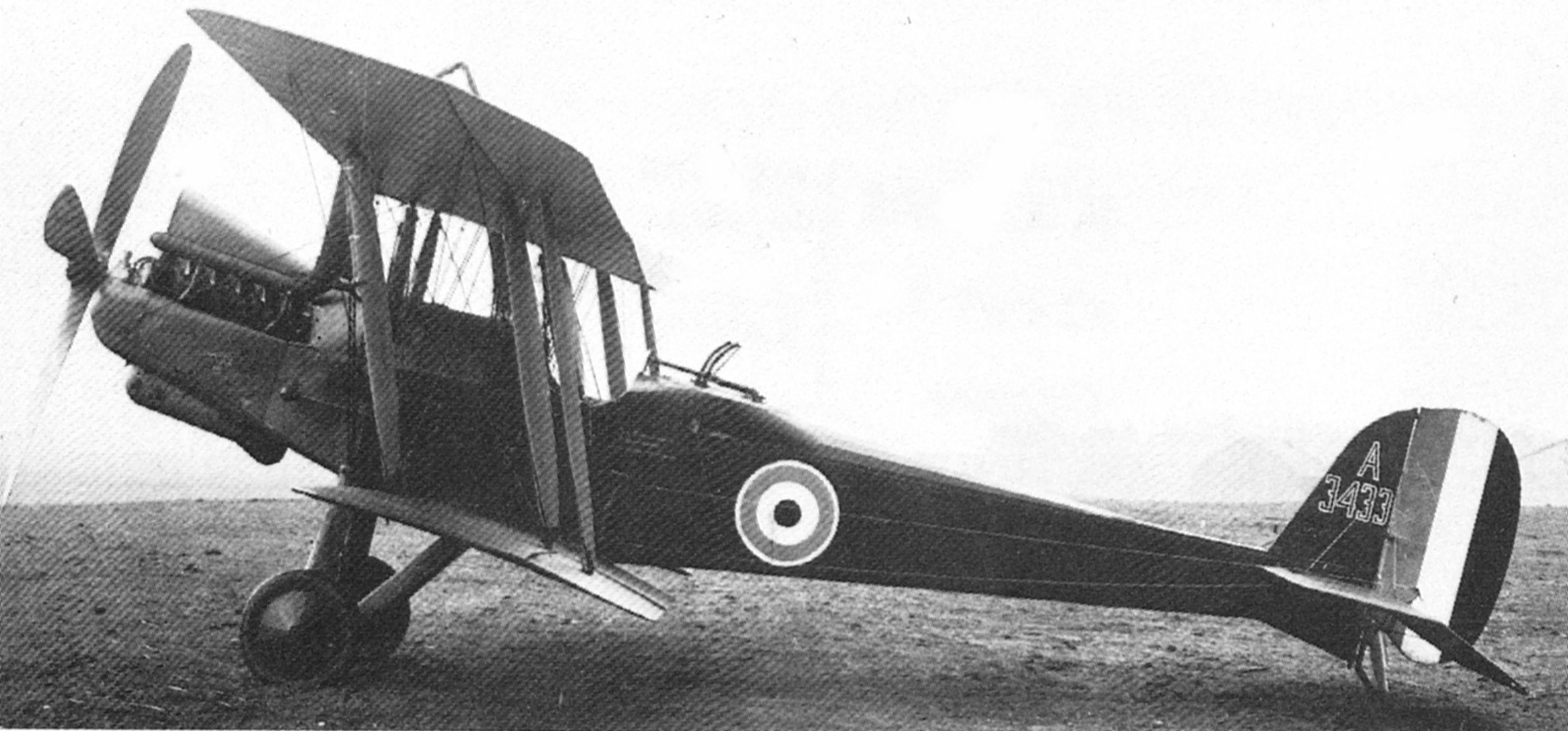
Early production R.E.8 with the small vertical fin. There is no fairing over the sump.

As early as March 1916, the design appears to have mostly been settled; features included the selection of a Royal Aircraft Factory 4a air-cooled V12 engine (capable of 140 hp) to power the type along with a sizable fin and rudder. During the early design process, a smaller tail fin was substituted for the original, a step which later caused some controversy. By early April 1916 a mock-up of the R.E.8 had been completed, and construction of a pair of prototypes was underway. On 16 June 1916, the first of these prototypes was submitted for its final pre-flight inspection in advance of the type's maiden flight.

On 17 June 1916, the first R.E.8 test flight was conducted by F.W. Goodden. Goodden would perform all of the early flights with the type; on 1 July 1916, Sefton Brancker was flown by Goodden in the type to Hounslow, London. On 16 July 1916, the second prototype, furnished with a different design of propeller, performed its first flight. During late July 1916, the second of two prototypes was dispatched to France for service trials, the results of which were largely successful, with aircrew being generally quite favourably impressed. During August 1916, the second prototype returned to Farnborough, Hampshire, where it underwent modification based upon its experiences in France.

The R.E.8 possessed a conventional wire-braced fabric-covered wooden structure, along with an unequal-span wing arrangement. The engine installation closely resembled that of the B.E.12, complete with the same large air scoop and similar vertically mounted exhausts protruding over the upper wing to carry the fumes clear of the crew. Apart from the disposition of the cockpits, the main visually distinguishable difference was that the engine was slightly raked back, to improve take off and landing characteristics. The early production R.E.8s were more or less identical to the prototypes.

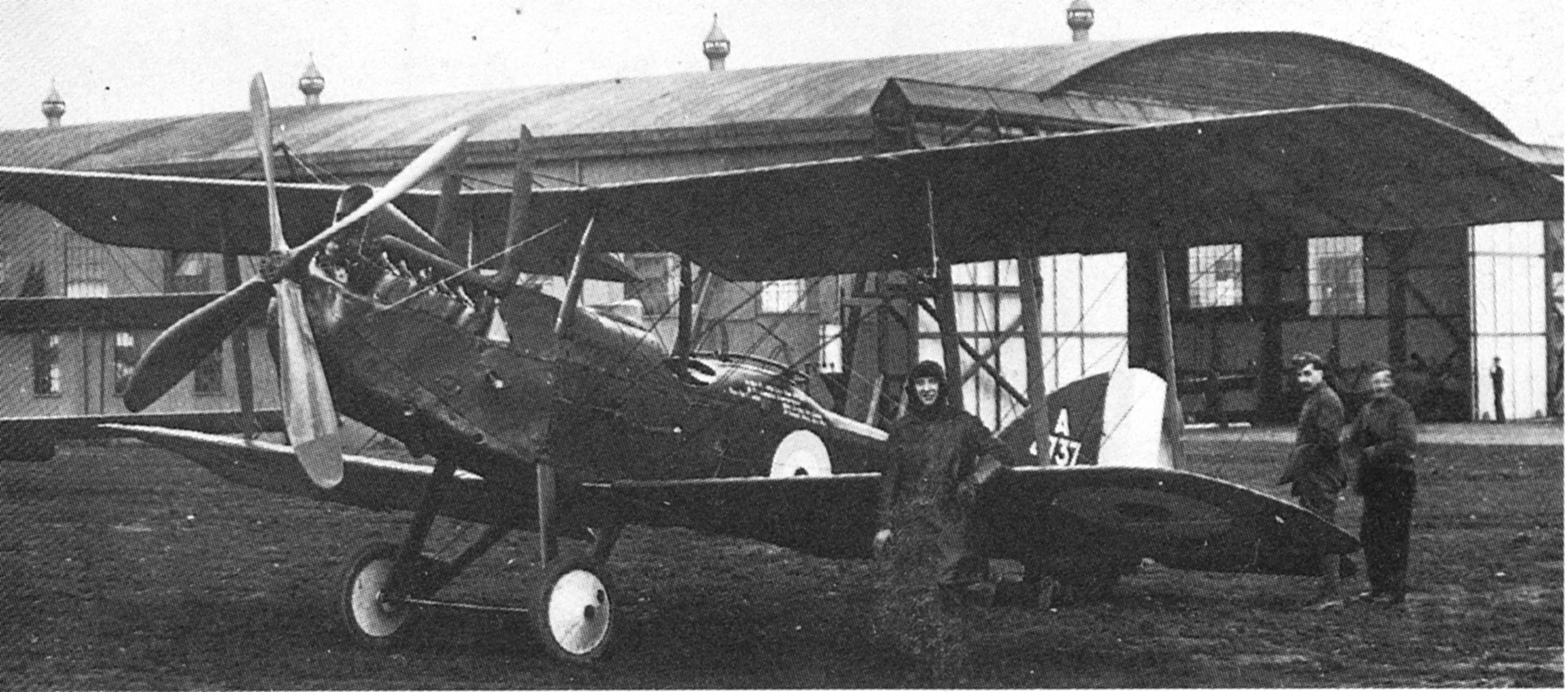
R.E.8 with enlarged fin, at training unit

The R.E.8 adopted a set of single bay, unequal span wings, identical to those of the earlier B.E.2e; although the span (and thus the wing area) had been increased slightly by the use of a wider upper centre section, and lower stub wings to match. On the B.E.2e, these wings functioned to maintain the stability of the B.E.2c while providing the aircraft with superior levels of manoeuvrability; although the long extensions on the upper wing gave rise to fears they would be prone to collapse if the aircraft was dived too sharply, which in turn did not help to build trust in the aircraft. Several other features, such as the tailplane, were also identical to those previously used upon the B.E.2e.

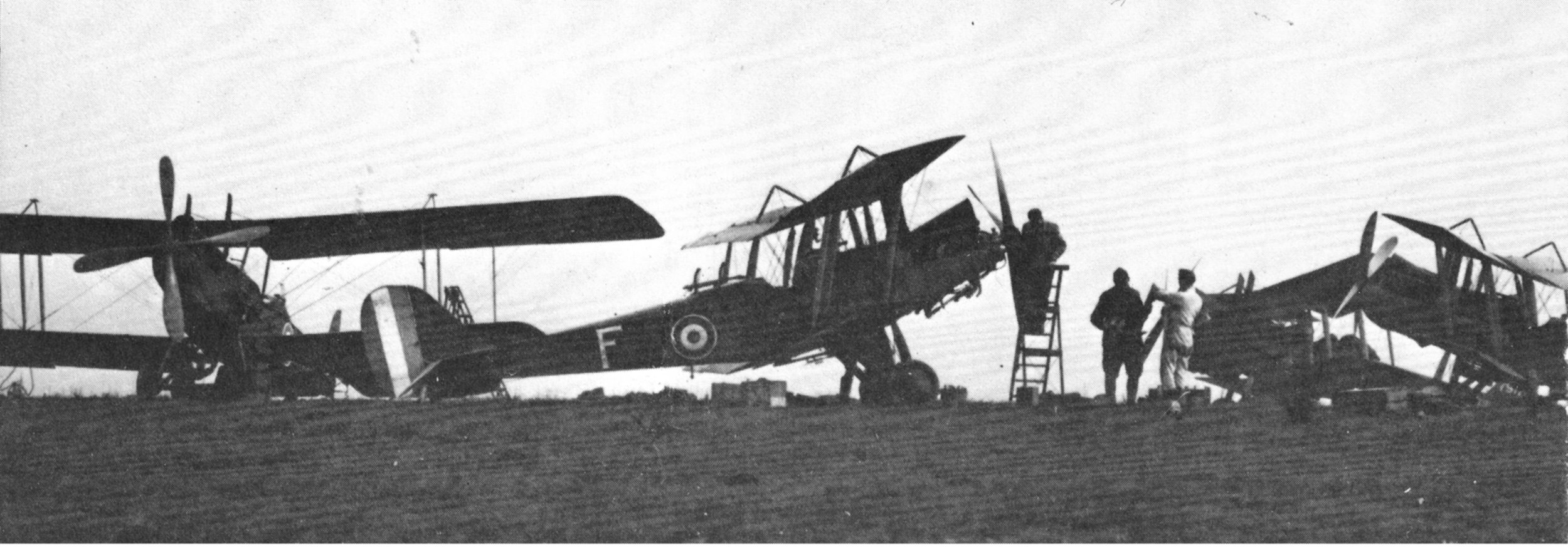
R.E.8s of No 3 Sqn AFC

For the purpose of making the R.E.8 less tiring to fly, the pilot's controls included a wheel to adjust the tailplane incidence in flight and a primitive form of rudder trim (applied to the rudder bar) was provided to alleviate the constant pressure necessary to counteract the torque generated by the propeller. Basic flight controls were installed in the observer's cockpit, which folded out of the way when not in use; these were connected to the elevators, rudder and throttle, but not to the ailerons, and were intended to give observers a chance to make a forced landing if the pilot was killed or incapacitated rather than to offer true dual control.

Although not so underpowered as the B.E.2, the R.E.8 was still handicapped by a less than adequate powerplant, and a model re-engined with the Hispano-Suiza engine was projected as the R.E.8a from quite an early stage. The cowling designed for the liquid-cooled engine closely resembled that of the B.E.12b or the S.E.5a. Supplies of Hispano-Suiza engines, more urgently required for other types, never permitted production of the R.E.8a, although a prototype was constructed and underwent trials during December 1916. Plans to mount Rolls-Royce aero engines, such as the Eagle or Falcon were also abortive, for similar reasons. These engines were in chronically short supply and reserved for various other types in British service, including the Airco DH.4 and the Bristol Fighter.

=== Production ===
During August 1916, production of an initial batch of 50 aircraft was commenced by the Royal Aircraft Factory itself. On 25 August, a contract was placed with Austin Motors for the completion of 100 R.E.8s; on 30 August, Siddeley-Deasy was also contracted to produce a further 100 examples. By September 1916, full-scale production was well under way. By the end of September, a further 850 R.E.8s had been ordered from a range of manufacturers. During December 1916, the first contractor-produced R.E.8s began to appear.

The Vickers-Challenger interrupter gear and the Scarff ring were still in short supply, being required for the Sopwith 1½ Strutter and other types; accordingly, a few early R.E.8s were built with a pillar mounting for the observer's gun as an interim measure. An alternative to the pilot's synchronised Vickers had been designed, consisting of a fixed Lewis gun with deflector plates fitted to the propeller, although this was never used, a Vickers gun for the pilot being mounted on the port side of the fuselage in a similar position to that on the B.E.12, at first synchronised by the Vickers-Challenger gear and then by the improved Constantinesco hydraulic gear. Photographs of this armament installation make it clear that the cocking handle of the Vickers gun was in easy reach of the pilot and that a normal Aldis sight was often mounted in the pilot's windscreen, giving the lie to statements that the forward firing gun could not be sighted properly due to its position, although the lack of standisation complicated maintenance in operational squadrons.

In total, 4,077 R.E.8s were constructed; a further 353 aircraft that had been on order were cancelled following the end of the war. Only a handful of production aircraft were actually completed by the Royal Aircraft Factory; the bulk of the work was issued out to several private companies including Austin Motors, Daimler, Standard Motors, Siddeley-Deasy and the Coventry Ordnance Works, which were responsible for the type throughout its production life.

== Operational history ==
The first production aircraft reached 52 Squadron Royal Flying Corps (RFC) in France in November 1916. The inexperienced pilots of 52 Squadron found their new mounts thoroughly dangerous and several were killed spinning in off a stall while attempting to land; they were grateful to return to the B.E.2e by exchanging aircraft with 34 Squadron in January 1917. Experienced pilots had fewer problems with the new type and re-equipment of B.E.2 squadrons continued. Pilot's notes for the R.E.8, prepared in the field, drew attention to the fact that it had a higher landing speed than the B.E.2e (hardly surprising, since it was heavier and had almost the same wing area) and that it gave almost no warning of a stall. This seems to have been the source of most complaints about the type's "trickiness".

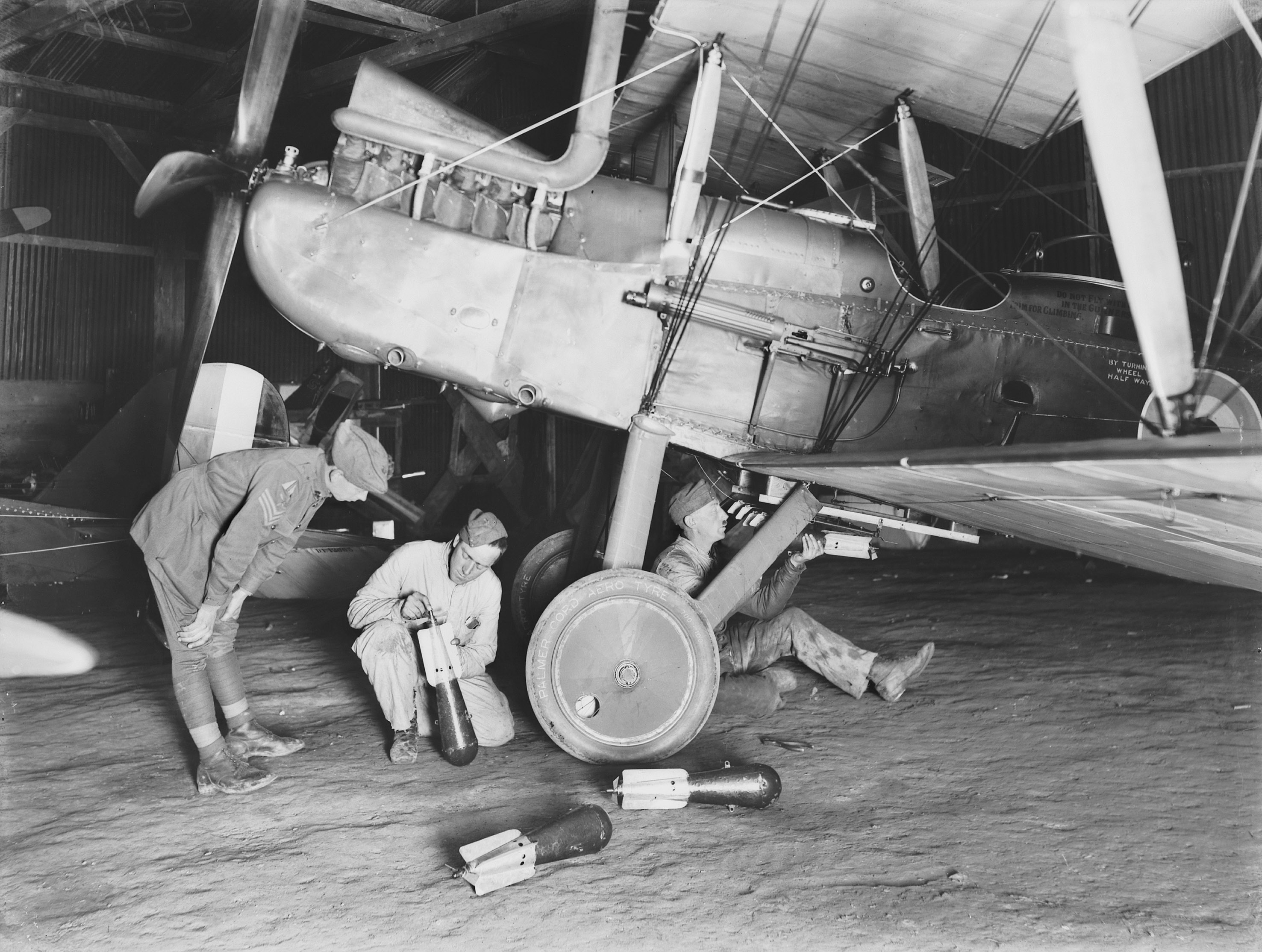
Preparing an R.E.8 for a night bombing raid

The Royal Aircraft Factory conducted spinning tests on the type, concluding that the R.E.8 was quite hard to spin and recovered easily; but the fin was redesigned with slightly increased area to improve spin recovery. The modification resulted in the production version being no less stable than the B.E.2e; and while this was an advantage for artillery observation and photography it gave the R.E.8 little chance to out-manoeuvre enemy fighters. An even larger fin was fitted to some R.E.8s used as trainers. Some pilots flew the R.E.8 with an empty reserve fuel tank (or even filled the tank with fire extinguisher fluid) to avoid a perceived tendency of R.E.8s to burn on crashing. None of these measures would have made the aircraft any "safer", if the problem was one of poor stalling characteristics. Several pilots who flew the type mentioned that they had no problems but were careful to keep the airspeed well above stalling point.

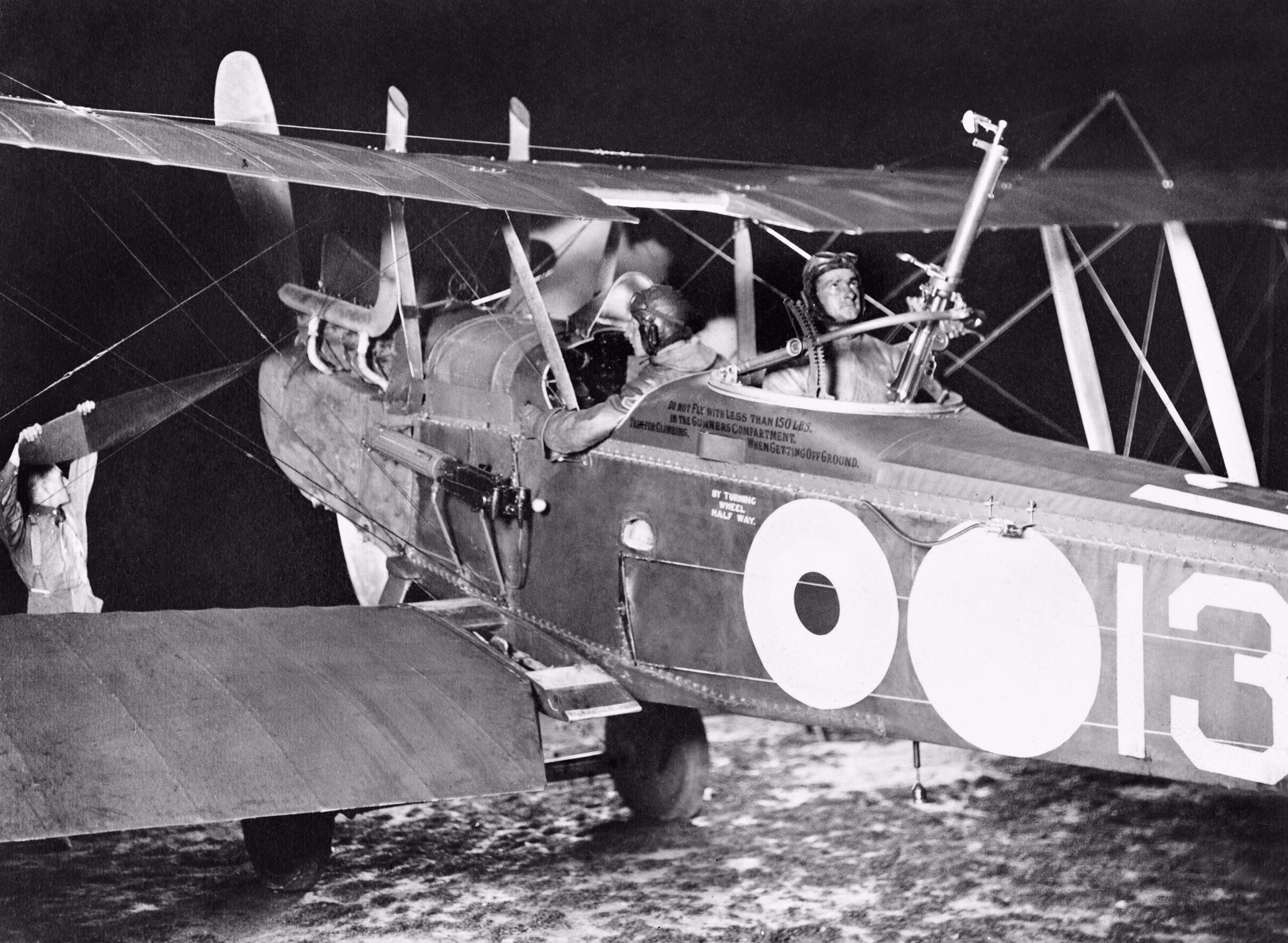
Preparing for a night take off

R.E.8s began to arrive at the front in numbers just as the period of German air superiority known as "Bloody April" was taking a heavy toll of all types in the RFC; and early service was not auspicious. On 13 April 1917, six R.E.8s from 59 Squadron were sent on a long range photo reconnaissance mission, missed their intended escorts, and were met by the picked fighter pilots of Jasta 11, who shot them all down within five minutes.

The casualty rate in R.E.8 squadrons became more sustainable as new Allied fighter types regained air superiority and pilot training and tactics improved. Although never a popular aeroplane, it was reasonably satisfactory for the tasks demanded of it and was even regarded with some affection, gaining the rhyming slang nickname "Harry Tate" (after a popular music hall artist of the time). Some crews flew their slow, cumbersome mounts quite aggressively; the German fighter ace Eduard Ritter von Dostler was shot down by an R.E.8 of 7 Squadron, while 3 Squadron Australian Flying Corps (AFC) was credited with 50 air victories in 12 months of operations. Lts Pithey and Rhodes of 12 Squadron were the most successful R.E.8 crew in air-to-air combat, being credited with twelve victories.

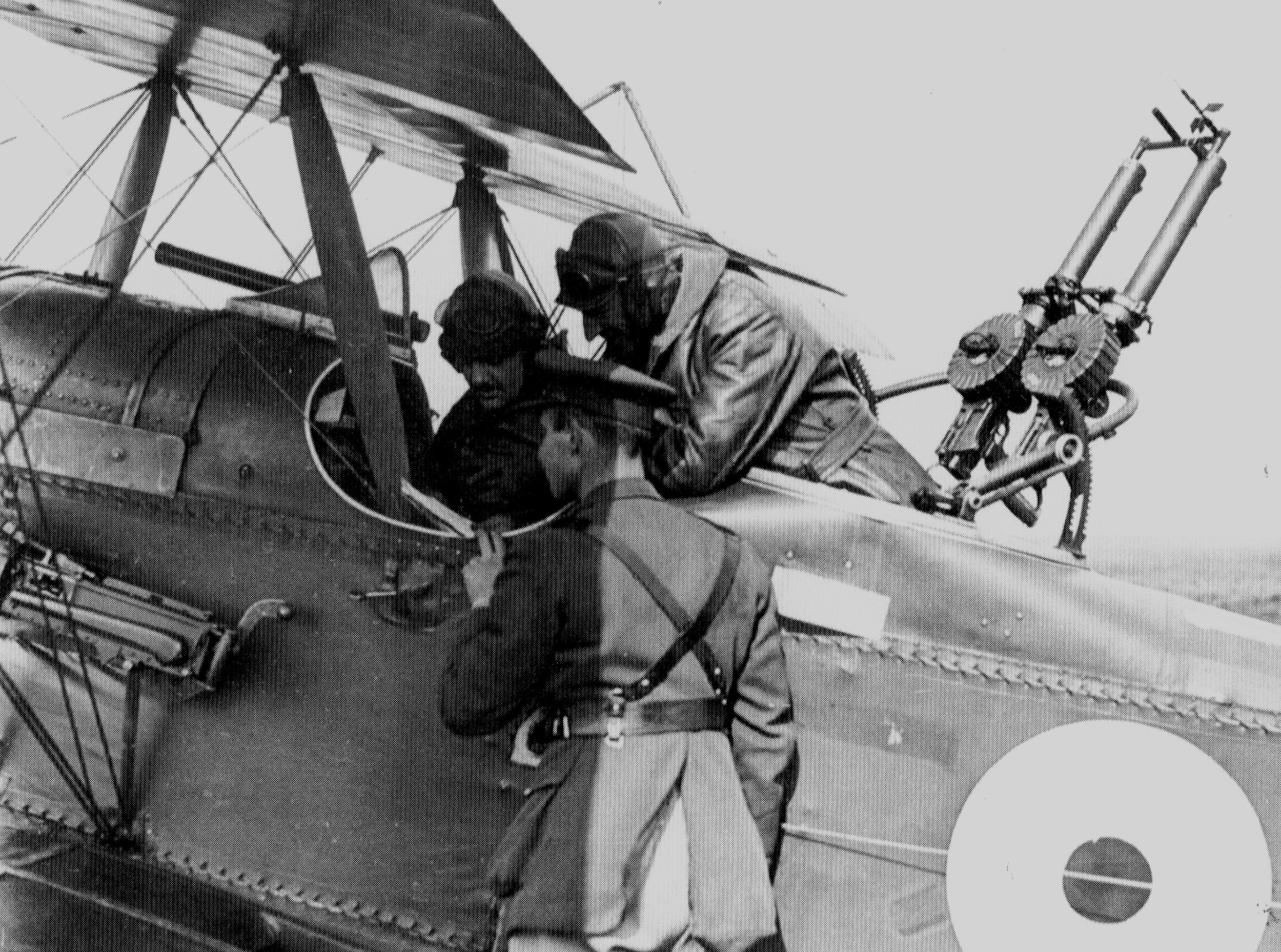
An R.E.8 crew are briefed before a mission

Although supplemented by other types, the R.E.8 remained the standard RFC artillery observation, air photography and general short range reconnaissance aircraft for the remainder of the war, equipping 18 RFC squadrons in 1917 and 19 squadrons in 1918. Belgium was the only country other than Britain and the Dominions to operate the R.E.8 during the First World War, receiving 22 in July 1917. At least some of the Belgian examples were fitted with Hispano-Suiza engines, in a SPAD type cowling, rather than the S.E.5a type cowling of the R.E.8a.

It was hoped to be able to replace the R.E.8 with a version of the Bristol Fighter powered by the Sunbeam Arab engine but the combination proved unsuccessful and few "Arab Bristols" were ever built. A few R.E.8 squadrons were issued with one or two standard (Falcon engined) F.2bs in the last weeks of the war. By November 1918, the R.E.8 was regarded as totally obsolete and surviving examples were quickly retired after the Armistice. Nor was the type popular with the private owners who purchased surplus RAF aircraft after the war and no R.E.8s came onto the civil register.

== Variants ==
R.E.8
Standard general purpose aircraft, powered by 140 hp (104 kW) RAF 4a engine.
R.E.8a
Conversion of one R.E.8 with 200 hp (149 kW) Hispano-Suiza engine in a square, S.E.5 (or B.E.12b) type cowling. No production due to shortage of Hispano engines. At least some of the R.E.8s supplied to Belgium were also re-engined with Hispanos – in this case in a cowling resembling that of the later SPADs.
R.E.9
R.E.8 modified with equal-span wings similar to those of the B.E.2c/d and the larger fin and rudder fitted to some R.E.8s at training units. Two were converted in 1917, but they showed no advantage over the standard R.E.8 (climb and manoeuvrability were worse) and no production followed.

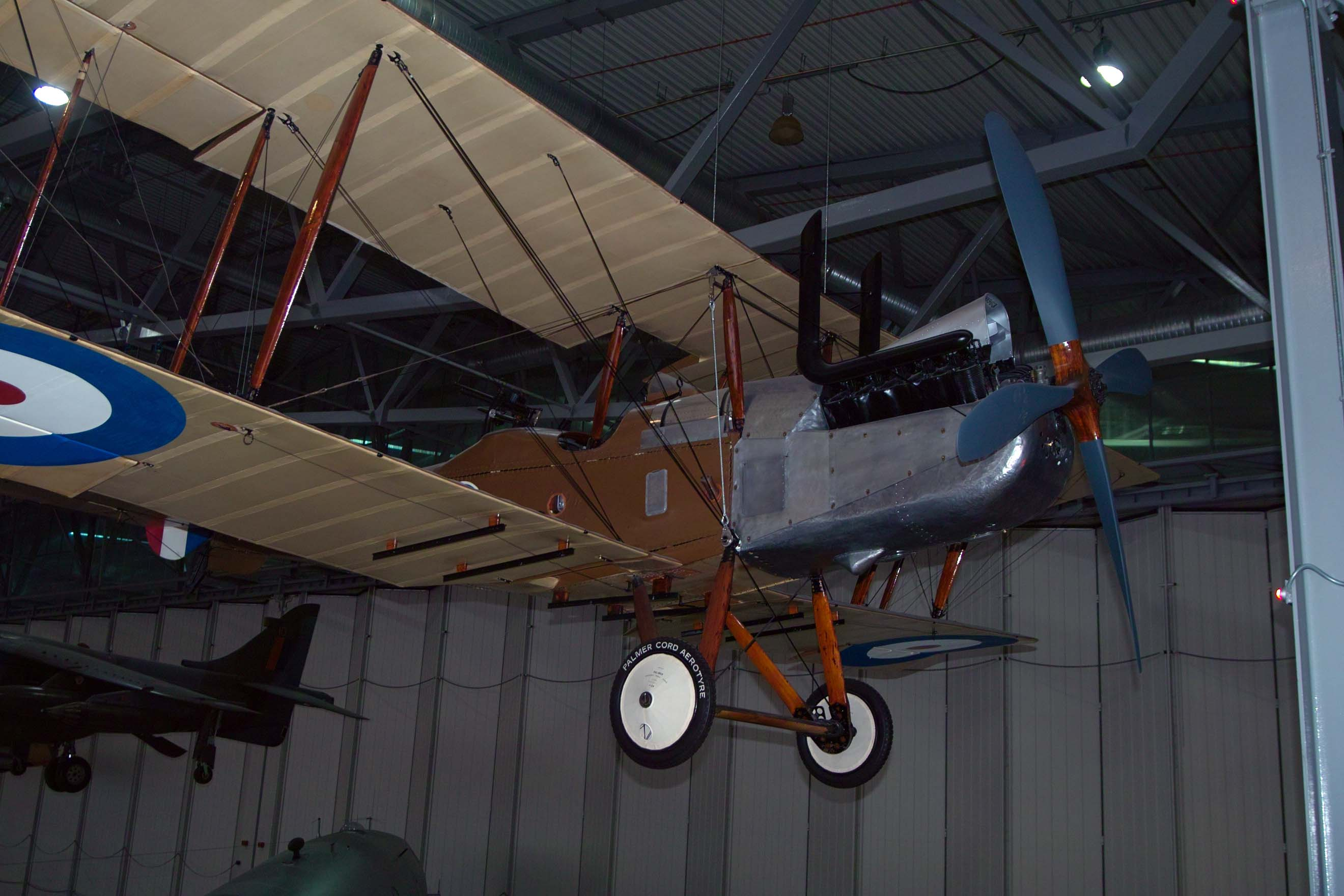
R.E.8 F3556 preserved at the Imperial War Museum Duxford

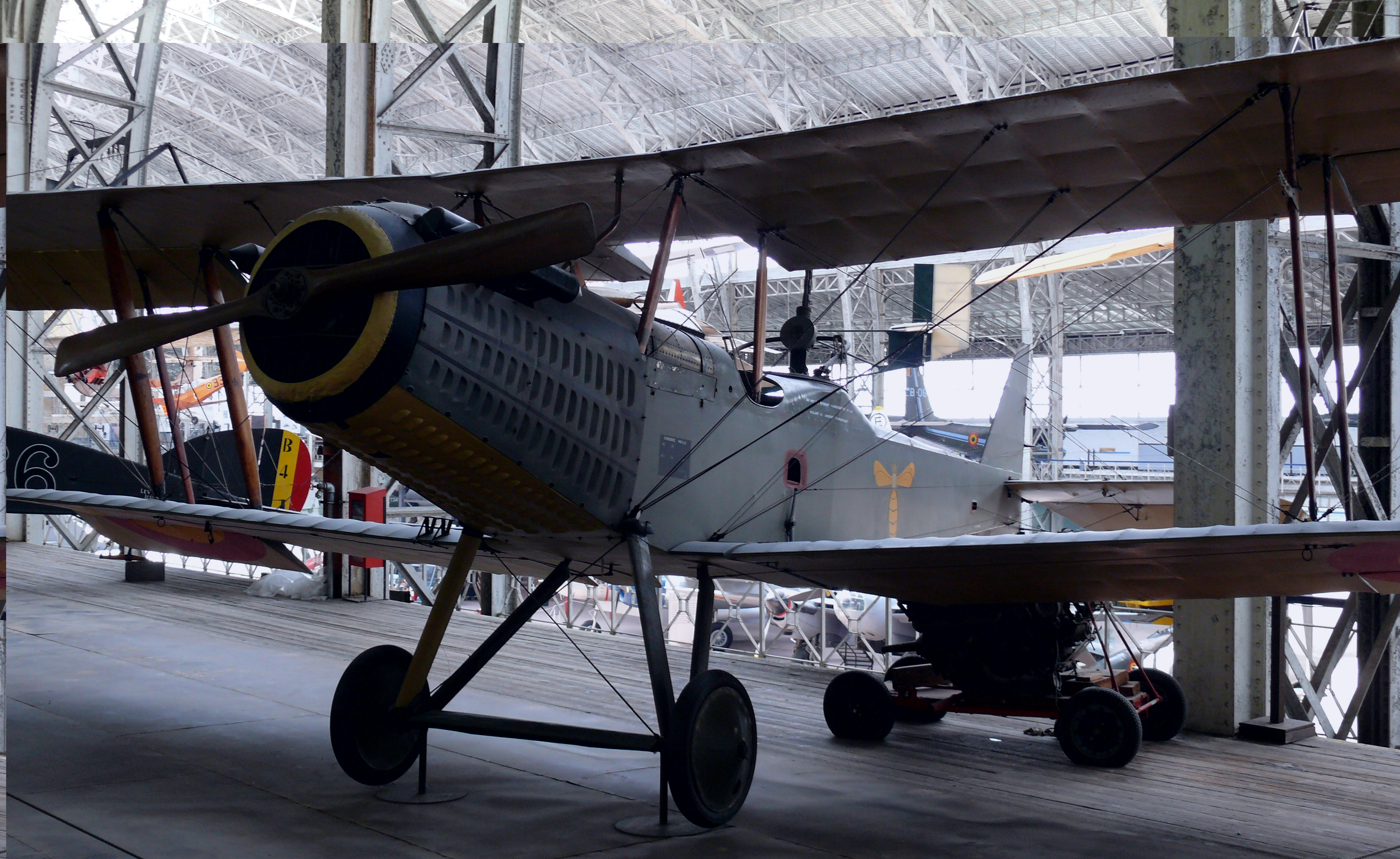
Belgian R.E.8 with water-cooled Hispano-Suiza engine in revised cowling

Siddeley-Deasy R.T.1
Development of R.E.8 with equal span biplane wings of a new design.

== Surviving aircraft ==
Only two "original" R.E.8s survive from World War One.

The restoration of R.E.8 F3556 at the Imperial War Museum Duxford was completed in 2004. This aircraft, built by Daimler, arrived in France on Armistice Day, still in its original packing case. It is currently displayed suspended from the roof of the AirSpace hangar at Duxford.

The other surviving R.E.8 is a former Aviation Militaire Belge machine preserved at the Brussels Air Museum. It is fitted with the usual Hispano-Suiza engine typical of R.E.8s in Belgian service, in the usual SPAD type cowling and circular frontal radiator.

The Royal Air Force Museum at Hendon has a full size replica R.E.8, which was built by The Vintage Aviator Ltd (TVAL ) in New Zealand in 2011. It is fitted with a "new build" RAF 4a engine and was successfully test flown at Masterton, NZ, on 1 January 2012, with the registration ZK-TVC. Crated and shipped to England, it was reassembled at The Shuttleworth Collection at Old Warden Airfield in June 2012 and undertook a number of flights painted as 'A3930' of No. 9 Squadron Royal Flying Corps, before being sent by road to Hendon in November 2012. It is now on static display in the Grahame-White Factory.

The Royal Australian Air Force has an airworthy replica R.E.8, built in 2012 and painted in late WW1 era Australian Flying Corps livery. It was previously part of the RAAF Museum collection and as of 2021 is with the Air Force Heritage Squadron.

== Operators ==
Australia

- Australian Flying Corps
  - No. 1 Squadron AFC in Egypt and Palestine
  - No. 3 Squadron AFC in France
  - No. 7 (Training) Squadron in United Kingdom

Belgium

- Aviation Militaire Belge
  - 6me Escadrille

Estonia

- Estonian Air Force

Soviet Union
United Kingdom

- Royal Flying Corps and the Royal Air Force

  - No. 4 Squadron RAF
  - No. 5 Squadron RAF
  - No. 6 Squadron RAF
  - No. 7 Squadron RAF
  - No. 8 Squadron RAF
  - No. 9 Squadron RAF
  - No. 12 Squadron RAF
  - No. 13 Squadron RAF
  - No. 14 Squadron RAF
  - No. 15 Squadron RAF
  - No. 16 Squadron RAF
  - No. 21 Squadron RAF
  - No. 30 Squadron RAF
  - No. 34 Squadron RAF
  - No. 37 Squadron RAF
  - No. 42 Squadron RAF
  - No. 50 Squadron RAF
  - No. 52 Squadron RAF
  - No. 53 Squadron RAF
  - No. 59 Squadron RAF
  - No. 63 Squadron RAF
  - No. 67 Squadron RAF
  - No. 69 Squadron RAF
  - No. 89 Squadron RAF
  - No. 91 Squadron RAF
  - No. 105 Squadron RAF
  - No. 106 Squadron RAF
  - No. 110 Squadron RAF
  - No. 113 Squadron RAF
  - No. 117 Squadron RAF
  - No. 139 Squadron RAF
  - No. 142 Squadron RAF
  - No. 144 Squadron RAF
  - No. 208 Squadron RAF

== Specifications ==
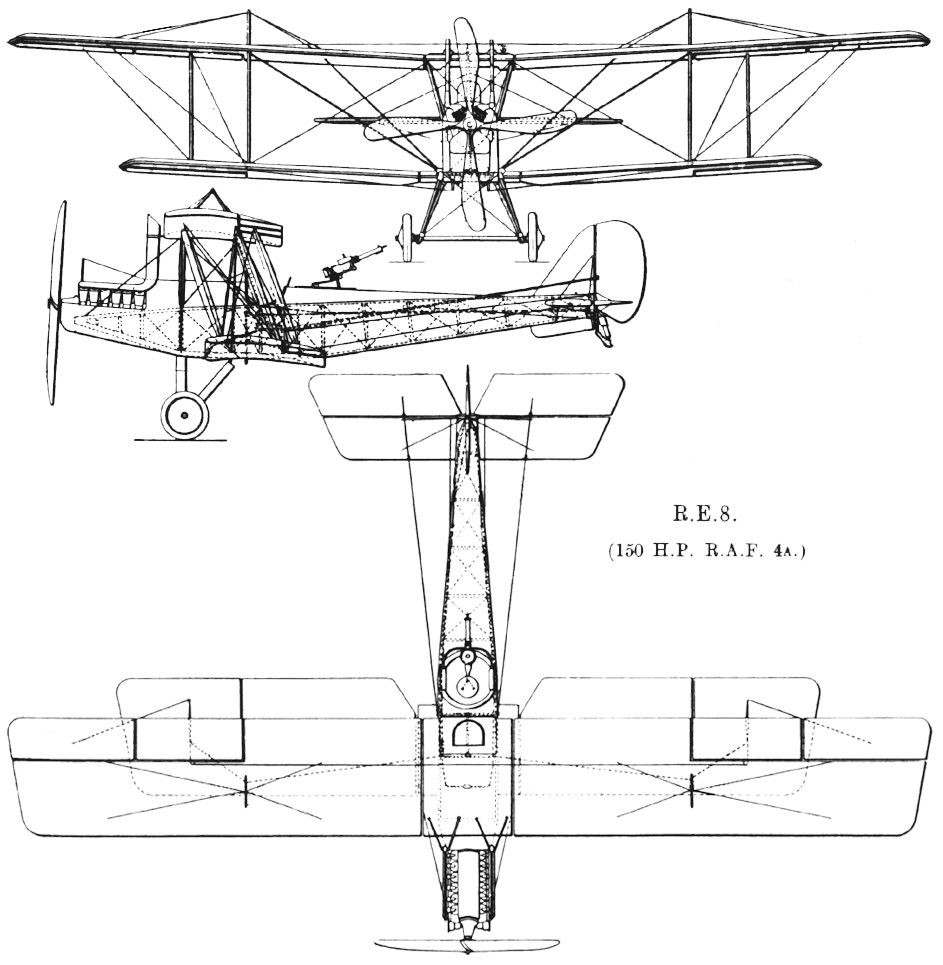
R.A.F. R.E.8 drawing

Data from The Royal Aircraft Factory

General characteristics

- Crew: 2
- Length: 27 ft 10.5 in (8.496 m)
- Wingspan: 42 ft 7 in (12.98 m)
- Height: 11 ft 4.5 in (3.467 m)
- Wing area: 377.5 sq ft (35.07 m^{2})
- Empty weight: 1,803 lb (818 kg)
- Gross weight: 2,678 lb (1,215 kg)
- Max takeoff weight: 2,869 lb (1,301 kg)
- Powerplant: 1 × Royal Aircraft Factory RAF 4a V-12 air-cooled piston engine, 140 hp (100 kW)
- Propellers: 4-bladed fixed-pitch propeller

Performance

- Maximum speed: 103 mph (166 km/h, 90 kn)
- Stall speed: 47 mph (76 km/h, 41 kn)
- Endurance: 4 hours 15 minutes
- Service ceiling: 13,500 ft (4,100 m)
- Time to altitude: 6,500 ft (2,000 m) in 21 minutes

Armament

- Guns: 1 x .303 in (7.7 mm) forward-firing Vickers gun and 1 or 2 x .303 in (7.7 mm) Lewis guns in rear cockpit
- Bombs: up to 224 lb (102 kg) bombs

== See also ==
Aircraft of comparable role, configuration, and era

- Royal Aircraft Factory B.E.2
- Rumpler C.I
- Albatros C.III

Related lists

- List of aircraft of the RAF
- List of bomber aircraft
