= Iden =

Car manufacturer

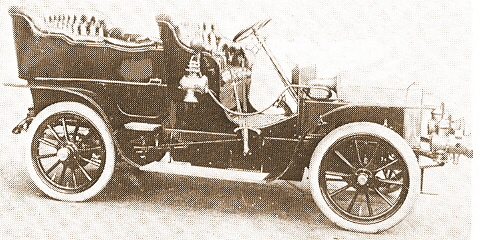
1905 Iden 12/16 hp

The Iden was an English automobile manufactured from 1904 until 1907. Designed by George Iden, formerly of Daimler, they were based in Coventry. They were four-cylinder 10/17 hp and 25/35 hp shaft-driven cars; each came with "Idens's frictionless radial gearbox".

Iden were wound up in 1906. Their Coventry factory was later used by the Deasy Motor Car Company, which became part of Armstrong Siddeley.

== See also ==
- List of car manufacturers of the United Kingdom
