= Royal Aircraft Factory B.E.12 =

Type of aircraft

B.E.12
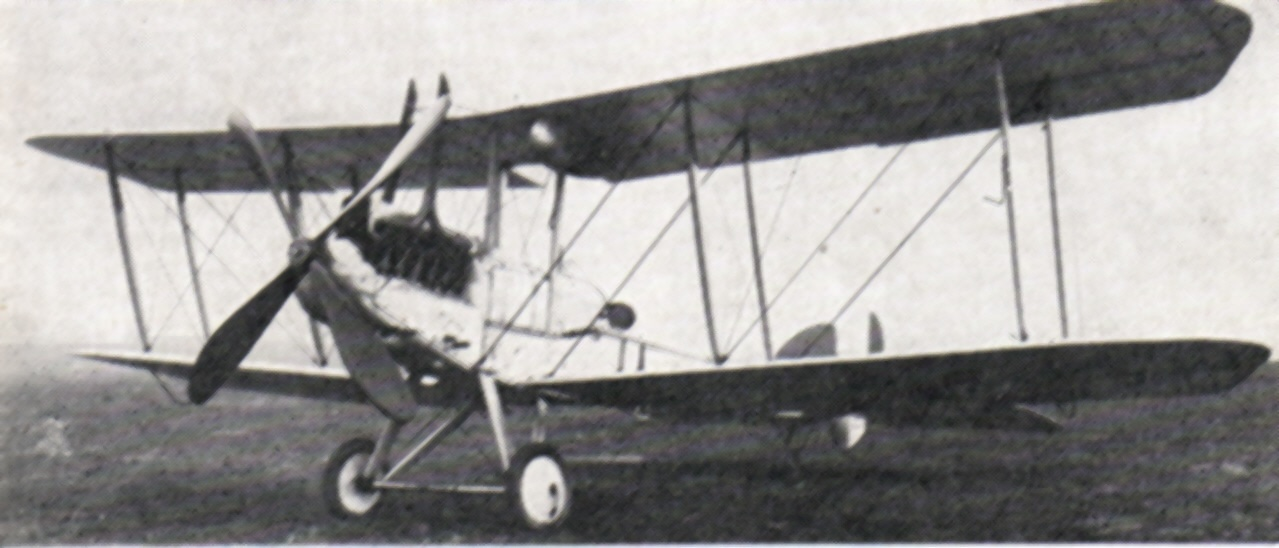
- An early production B.E.12

General information
- Type: General purpose aircraft/Fighter
- Manufacturer: Royal Aircraft Factory, Various
- Primary user: Royal Flying Corps
- Number built: 601

History
- Introduction date: 1 August 1916
- First flight: 28 July 1915

The Royal Aircraft Factory B.E.12 was a British single-seat aeroplane of The First World War designed at the Royal Aircraft Factory. It was essentially a single-seat version of the B.E.2.

Intended for use as a long-range reconnaissance and bombing aircraft, the B.E.12 was pressed into service as a fighter, in which role it proved disastrously inadequate, mainly due to its poor manoeuvrability.

== Development ==
The B.E.12 was essentially a B.E.2c with the front (observer's) cockpit replaced by a large fuel tank, and the 90 hp (67 kW) RAF 1 engine of the standard B.E.2c replaced by the new 150 hp (110 kW) RAF 4. Aviation historians once considered the type a failed attempt to create a fighter aircraft based on the B.E.2 – that was improvised and rushed into service to meet the Fokker threat. Many writers perpetuate this or a similar view. J.M. Bruce, on the other hand, has pointed out that this is simplistic at best and doesn't fit historically.

The prototype (a modified B.E.2c airframe fitted with the more powerful 150 hp (110 kW) RAF 4a air-cooled V12 engine) was already in the process of conversion in June 1915, while the "Fokker scourge" cannot be said to have started before the first victory by a Fokker E.I on 1 August, when Max Immelmann shot down a British aircraft that was bombing Douai aerodrome. At the time the B.E.12 was conceived the necessity for an aeroplane to defend itself was by no means as clear as it became later. The idea of dispensing with defensive armament altogether and replacing the observer's seat with extra fuel capacity and/or bombload was typified by several contemporary designs, such as the bomber versions of the Avro 504, and Sopwith 1½ Strutter. In any case the B.E.12 cannot have been produced specifically as an "answer" to the Fokker.

In mid-1915 there was no way for a British single-seat tractor aircraft to carry a forward-firing armament as the Vickers-Challenger "interrupter" gear did not exist until December and was not available in numbers until the following March. The latest Royal Aircraft Factory single-seat fighter of the time, the F.E.8, was a nimble little pusher – proving if nothing else that its designers were very well aware of the basic requirements of a successful fighter.

Nor was the B.E.12 "rushed" into service as would have been relatively easy as it was a straightforward conversion of a type in production. Trials with the prototype continued through late 1915 and seem to have been mainly concerned with the development of the new RAF 4 engine, especially the design of a satisfactory air scoop. Cooling of the rear cylinders of the RAF 4, an air-cooled V12 and later the engine of the R.E.8, was always rather dubious. The type was also tested as a bomber. By the time a synchronised Vickers gun was fitted to the type in May 1916, armament trials had already been undertaken with upward-firing Lewis guns, similar to those used by the night fighter version of the B.E.2c.

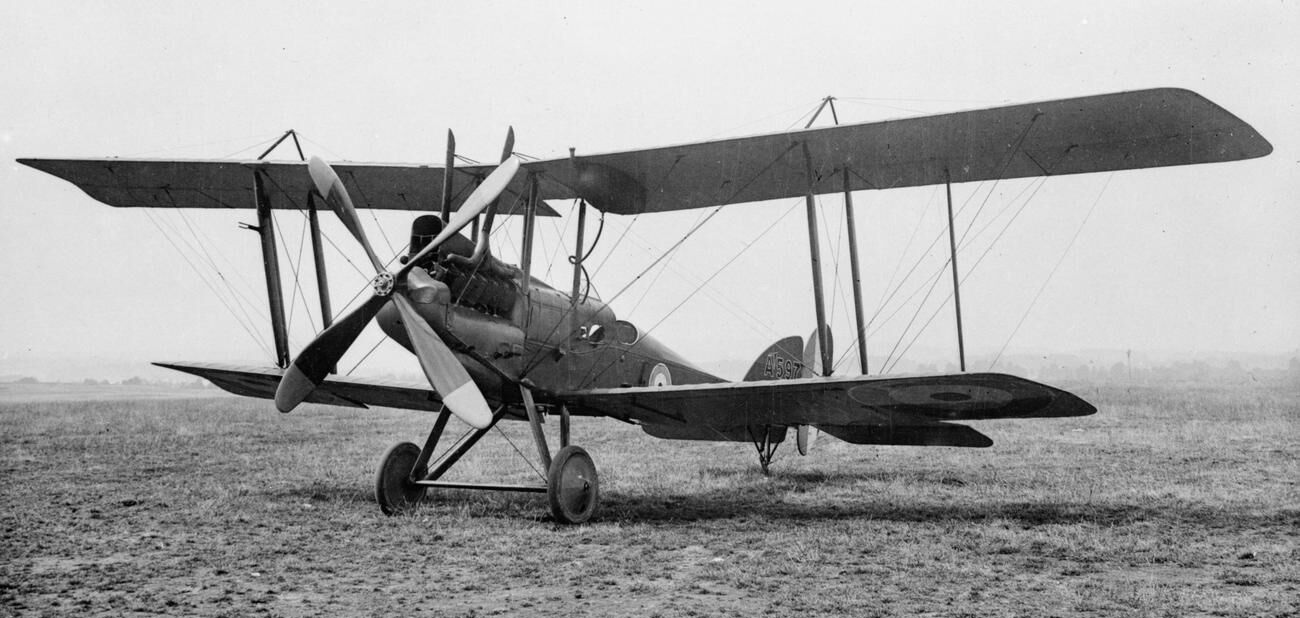
B.E.12a variant

The B.E.12a variant flew for the first time in February 1916 and had the modified wings of the B.E.2e. It was rather more manoeuvrable than the B.E.12 but was otherwise little improved. The B.E.12a saw service with home defence units, training establishments and No. 19 squadron in the Middle East.

The B.E.12b used the B.E.2c airframe but had the 200 hp (150 kW) Hispano-Suiza engine. It was intended as a night fighter and carried wing mounted Lewis guns in place of the synchronised Vickers. Apparently it had a good performance but the engine was more urgently needed for the S.E.5a and very few B.E.12b fighters went into service with home defence squadrons. Some of those built may never have received engines.

== Operational Service ==
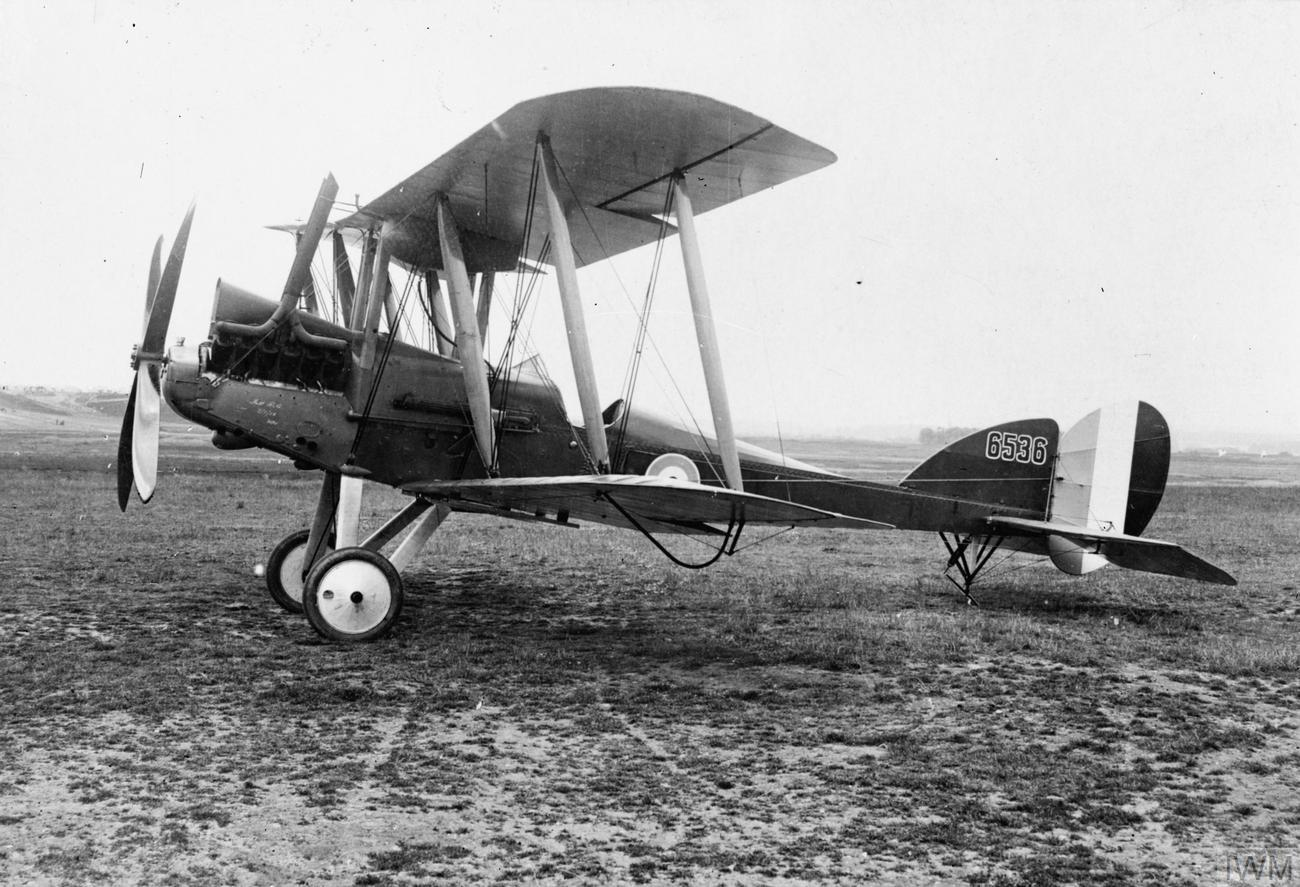
B.E.12 single-seat scout

The first B.E.12 squadron, No. 19 did not reach France until 1 August 1916. It was followed by the only other squadron to fly the type in France, No. 21, on the 25th. As might have been expected, the new type had all the inherent stability of the B.E.2c and when pressed into service as a fighter proved quite useless, especially in the face of the new German Halberstadt and Albatros fighters coming into service. It continued to be employed as a bomber but since an effective defensive gun could not be mounted it was too vulnerable and was finally withdrawn from all front line duties in France in March 1917. By the time the B.E.12a became available in numbers the original model had already proved to be unsatisfactory and this variant was never used operationally in France.

Several Home defence squadrons flew B.E.12s, along with examples of the B.E.12a and B.E.12b variants. Its stability and range were advantageous for night missions but its rate of climb was inadequate for intercepting the improved German airships of 1916/17, let alone the aeroplane raiders that replaced them. The Zeppelin L.48 was shot down by a Home Defence B.E.12 on 17 June 1917 but otherwise, there are few recorded successes in this role.

In the Middle Eastern theatre and in Macedonia, the B.E.12 and B.E.12a proved more useful, typically as long range reconnaissance aircraft rather than as fighters, although Captain Gilbert Ware Murlis Green of No. 17 Squadron, used his to shoot down several German aircraft and become the only B.E.12 ace.

The B.E.12b served only with Home Defence squadrons; deliveries began in late 1917, but due to the more urgent need of the S.E.5a squadrons for their Hispano-Suiza engines many were either never fitted with engines, or completed as B.E.12s.

== Reproductions ==
No original BE12s are known to exist but The Vintage Aviator Ltd in New Zealand has built an airworthy reproduction which is flown from the firm's Hood Aerodrome, Masterton base.

== Variants ==
- B.E.12 – Initial production version powered by a RAF 4a engine – basically a B.E.2c conversion (250 built by Daimler, 50 built by Standard Motors)
- B.E.12a – With the wings and tail unit of the B.E.2e (50 built by Daimler, 50 built by Coventry Ordnance Works)
- B.E.12b – Re-engined version powered by a 200 hp (150 kW) Hispano-Suiza engine (200 built by Daimler)

== Operators ==
- Royal Flying Corps
  - No. 10 Squadron RFC
  - No. 14 Squadron RFC
  - No. 17 Squadron RFC
  - No. 19 Squadron RFC
  - No. 21 Squadron RFC
  - No. 36 Squadron RFC
  - No. 33 Squadron RFC
  - No. 37 Squadron RFC
  - No. 38 Squadron RFC
  - No. 39 Squadron RFC
  - No. 47 Squadron RFC
  - No. 48 Squadron RFC
  - No. 50 Squadron RFC
  - No. 51 Squadron RFC
  - No. 66 Squadron RFC
  - No. 67 Squadron RFC
  - No. 75 Squadron RFC
  - No. 76 Squadron RFC
  - No. 77 Squadron RFC
  - No. 78 Squadron RFC
  - No. 84 Squadron RFC
  - No. 89 Squadron RFC
  - No. 101 Squadron RFC
  - No. 112 Squadron RFC
  - No. 141 Squadron RFC
  - No. 142 Squadron RFC
  - No. 144 Squadron RFC
  - No. 150 Squadron RFC
- Australian Flying Corps
  - No. 1 Squadron AFC in Palestine.

== Specifications (B.E.12) ==
Data from War Planes of the First World War:Volume Two Fighters

General characteristics

- Crew: 1
- Length: 27 ft 3 in (8.31 m)
- Wingspan: 37 ft 0 in (11.28 m)
- Height: 11 ft 1.5 in (3.391 m)
- Wing area: 371 sq ft (34.5 m^{2})
- Empty weight: 1,635 lb (742 kg)
- Powerplant: × RAF 4a V-12 air-cooled piston engine, 150 hp (110 kW)
- Propellers: 4-bladed fixed-pitch wooden propeller

Performance

- Maximum speed: 102 mph (164 km/h, 89 kn) at sea level
- Endurance: 3 hours
- Service ceiling: 12,500 ft (3,800 m)
- Time to altitude: 5,000 ft (1,500 m) in 11 minutes

Armament

- Guns: 1× .303 in (7.7 mm) synchronised Vickers machine gun – some aircraft carried various arrangements of rearward firing Lewis guns.
- Bombs: up to 336 pounds (152 kg) bombs

== See also ==
Related development

- Royal Aircraft Factory B.E.2

Related lists

- List of aircraft of the Royal Air Force
- List of aircraft of the Royal Flying Corps

== Bibliography ==
- Bruce, J.M. (1968). War Planes of the First World War:Volume Two Fighters. London: Macdonald. ISBN 0-356-01473-8.
- Bruce, J.M. (1982). The Aeroplanes of the Royal Flying Corps (Military Wing). London: Putnam. ISBN 0-370-30084-X.
- The Illustrated Encyclopedia of Aircraft (Part Work 1982–1985). Orbis Publishing.
