= Siddeley Tiger =

1920s British piston aircraft engine

Tiger
- The Siddeley Tiger
- Type: V12 inline engine
- National origin: United Kingdom
- Manufacturer: Siddeley-Deasy
- First run: 1920

The Siddeley Tiger was an unsuccessful British aero engine developed shortly after the end of World War I by Siddeley-Deasy. Problems encountered during flight testing caused the project to be cancelled.

== Design and development ==
Developed using two modified cylinder banks from the Siddeley Puma, the Tiger was a liquid-cooled 60-degree V12 engine with the advanced feature of an electric starter motor protected by a friction clutch. A reduction gear arrangement was provided for the propeller drive with a ratio of 0.559:1. The company claimed a power output of 600 hp (447 kW) but this was regarded as optimistic. Flight testing by a Royal Aircraft Establishment test pilot, Frank Courtenay, revealed problems and his opinion of the engine was low as the following quote shows:

'The engines could never be persuaded to run simultaneously for any length of time'

— Frank T.Courtenay, Lumsden – British Aero-Engines and Their Aircraft

== Application and cancellation ==
The Tarrant Tabor, a giant triplane bomber was designed to use the Tiger but redesigned to use other engines when it became clear the Tiger would not be available soon enough. The only aircraft in which the Siddeley Tiger flew was the ill-fated prototype of the twin-engined Siddeley-Deasy Siniai of which three were planned to be produced. Major problems with both the engines and this experimental bomber aircraft led to cancellation of the projects.

The Siddeley Tiger marked the end of the aero engine line started by Beardmore and Siddeley-Deasy. The name was later re-used for an Armstrong Siddeley radial engine.

== Specifications (Tiger) ==
Data from Lumsden.

=== General characteristics ===
- Type: 12-cylinder liquid-cooled inline piston engine
- Bore: 6.3 in (160 mm)
- Stroke: 7.1 in (180 mm)
- Displacement: 2,657 in³ (43.5 L)
- Length: 81.34 in (2,066 mm)
- Width: 33.46 in (850 mm)
- Height: 39.57 in (1,005 mm)
- Dry weight: 1,400 lb (635 kg)

=== Components ===
- Valvetrain: Overhead camshaft, 4 valves per cylinder
- Fuel system: Twin carburettors
- Fuel type: Petrol
- Cooling system: Liquid-cooled

=== Performance ===
- Power output: 600 hp (447 kW)
- Power-to-weight ratio: 0.42 hp/lb (0.7 kW/kg)

== See also ==
Related development

- Galloway Atlantic
- Siddeley Pacific
- Siddeley Puma

Comparable engines

- Rolls-Royce Condor

Related lists

- List of aircraft engines
