= Siddeley-Deasy Sinaia =

Sinaia

General information
- Type: Day bomber
- National origin: United Kingdom
- Manufacturer: Siddeley-Deasy
- Designer: F.M Green and John Lloyd
- Number built: 1

History
- First flight: 25 June 1921

The Siddeley-Deasy Sinaia, also known as the Armstrong Whitworth Sinaia, was a twin-engined biplane day bomber with gunners in rearwards extensions of the engine nacelles. Two examples were ordered by the Air Ministry but only one was completed.

== Development ==
The Sinaia was the third and last aircraft design produced by the team led by John Lloyd and F. M. Green at Siddeley-Deasy before they were rebadged by merger as the Sir W. G. Armstrong Aircraft Company. Indeed, by the time it flew in 1921 this change had taken effect. It was designed to meet an Air Ministry requirement for a day bomber. A large twin-engined biplane, its most interesting feature was the arrangement of the defensive armament. The Sinaia's engines were in nacelles mounted on the top of the lower wings and these nacelles were extended rearwards and upwards. Each extension housed a gunner's cockpit at its extremity, fitted with a gun ring. From these positions the gunners would have been able to defend both sides of the bomber independently.

The Sinaia was a three bay (with struts to the upper wings from the engine nacelles) biplane. The wings carried no stagger and were of equal span, though the lower wing was narrower. There were horn balanced ailerons on all wings. The empennage was of biplane configuration with a balanced elevator on the upper plane and containing three balanced rudders. The square section fuselage placed the pilot's cockpit well forward of the engines and a third gunner's position in the extreme, slanted nose. A two-wheeled main undercarriage unit was mounted under each engine.

The Sinaia was powered by two 500 hp Siddeley Tiger water-cooled engines, a new V-12 design produced by combining two straight-6 Siddeley Pumas onto a single crankshaft. Unsurprisingly this little-tested powerplant proved unreliable and frequent problems with it interrupted the flight trials of the Sinaia, which flew for the first time on 25 June 1921. By October the airframe was showing signs of structural problems and the only Sinaia ever built was taken out of use.

== Specifications ==
Data from

General characteristics

- Crew: 4
- Wingspan: 86 ft 10 in (26.47 m)
- Wing area: 1,823 sq ft (169.4 m^{2})
- Gross weight: 16,000 lb (7,257 kg)
- Powerplant: 2 × Siddeley Tiger water-cooled V12 engines, 500 hp (370 kW) each
