= No. 50 Squadron RAF =

Defunct flying squadron of the Royal Air Force

- No. 50 Squadron badge
- Active: 15 May 1916 – 13 June 1919; 3 May 1937 – 31 January 1951; 15 August 1952 – 1 October 1959; 1 August 1961 – 31 March 1984
- Country: United Kingdom
- Branch: Royal Air Force
- Mottos: Latin: Sic fidem servamus ("Thus we keep faith"); Squadron badge shows "From Defence to Attack"
- Battle honours: Home Defence, 1916–18*: Channel & North Sea, 1939–43*: Norway 1940: Baltic, Invasion Ports, 1940: 1940–43: France & Low Countries, 1940: Biscay Ports, 1940–44: German Ports, 1940–45*: Ruhr, 1940–45*: Berlin, 1940–44*: Fortress Europe, 1940–44*: Normandy, 1944*: France & Germany, 1944–45*: Walcheren: Rhine: Honours marked with an asterisk are those emblazoned on the Squadron Standard

Insignia
- Squadron badge heraldry: A sword in bend severing a mantle palewise. This unit formed at Dover and adopted a mantle being severed by a sword to show its connection with that town, the arms of which include St. Martin and the beggar with whom he divided his cloak. The mantle is also indicative of the protection given to this country by the Royal Air Force.
- Squadron codes: QX Dec 1938 – Sep 1939; VN Sep 1939 – Jan 1951

No. 50 Squadron was a squadron of the Royal Air Force. It was formed during the First World War as a home defence fighter squadron, and operated as a bomber squadron during the Second World War and the Cold War. It disbanded for the last time in 1984.

== History ==
=== First World War ===
No. 50 Squadron of the Royal Flying Corps founded at Dover on 15 May 1916. It was equipped with a mixture of aircraft, including Royal Aircraft Factory B.E.2s and Royal Aircraft Factory B.E.12s in the home defence role, having flights based at various airfields around Kent. It flew its first combat mission in August 1916, when its aircraft helped to repel a German Zeppelin. On 7 July 1917 a 50 Squadron Armstrong Whitworth F.K.8 shot down a German Gotha bomber off the North Foreland of Kent. In February 1918, it discarded its miscellany of aircraft to standardise on the more capable Sopwith Camel fighter, continuing to defend Kent. By October 1918, it was operating its Camels as night fighters. It was during this period that the squadron started using the running dogs device on squadron aircraft, a tradition that continued until 1984. The device arose from the radio call sign Dingo that the squadron was allocated as part of the Home Defence network. It disbanded on 13 June 1919. The last CO of the squadron before it disbanded was Major Arthur Harris later to become Air Officer Commanding-in-Chief of RAF Bomber Command during the Second World War.

=== Reformation and Second World War ===
No. 50 Squadron reformed at RAF Waddington on 3 May 1937, equipped with Hawker Hind biplane light bombers. It started to convert to the Handley Page Hampden monoplane medium bomber in December 1938, discarding its last Hinds in January 1939. It was still equipped with Hampdens when the Second World War broke out, forming part of 5 Group, Bomber Command. It flew its first bombing raid on 19 March 1940 against the seaplane base at Hörnum on the island of Sylt.

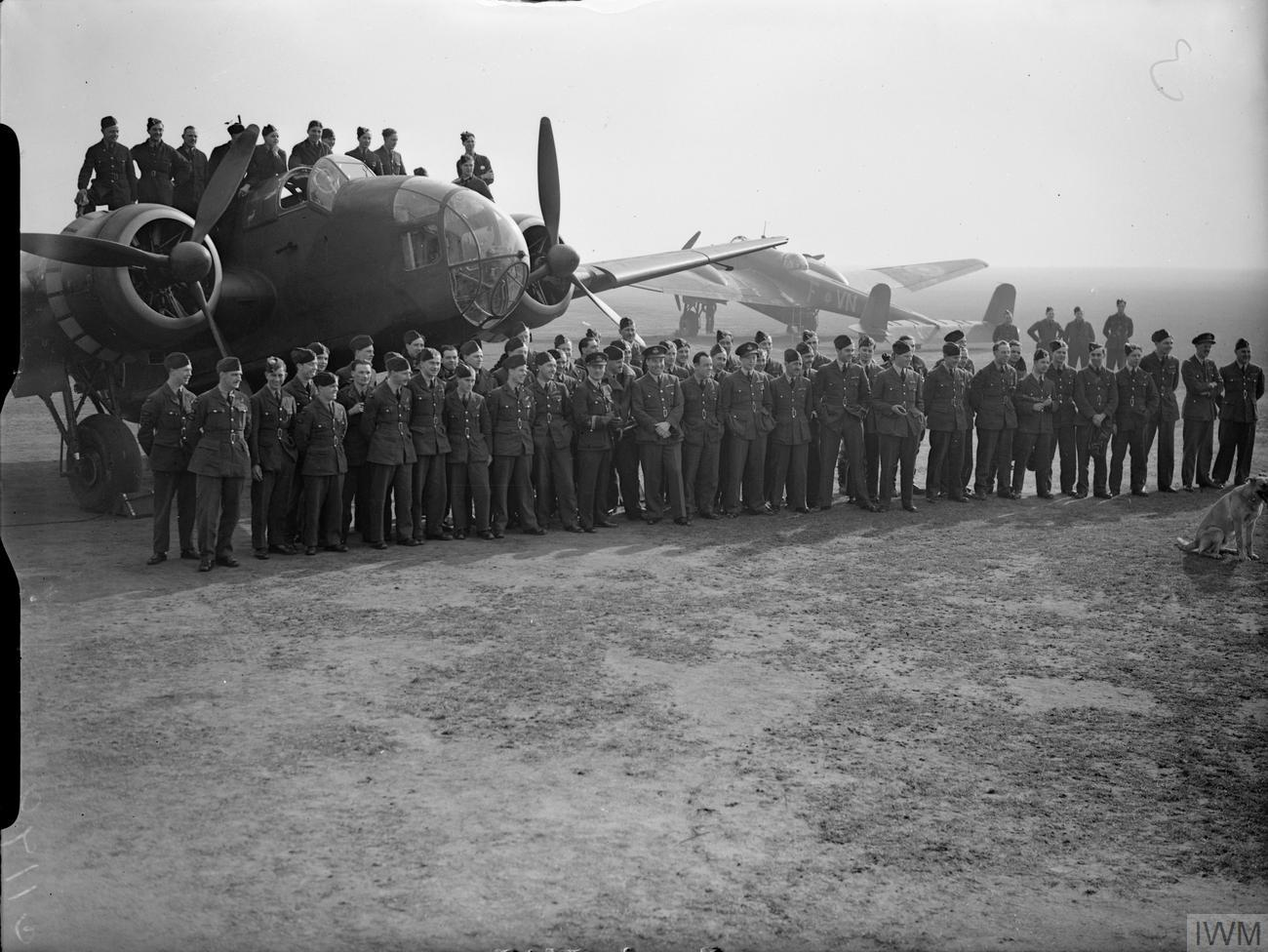
Aircrew of No. 50 Squadron in front of their Handley Page Hampdens at Waddington, April 1940

On 12 April 1940, in an attempt to attack German warships off Kristiansand returning from the German invasion of Norway, 50 Squadron took part in what was the largest British air raid of the war so far, with a total of 83 RAF bombers attempting to attack the German fleet. When 12 Hampdens of 50 and 44 Squadron spotted a German warship and attempted to attack, they lost 6 of their number to beam attacks by German fighters, with 13 officers and men from 50 Squadron dead or missing. After these losses, daylight attacks with Hampdens were abandoned.

No. 50 Squadron continued operations by night, taking part in the RAF's strategic bombing offensive against the Germans through the remainder of 1940 and 1941. It re-equipped with Avro Manchesters from April 1942. The Manchester was disappointing, however, with unreliable engines and had a lower ceiling than the Hampden it replaced. Despite these problems, the squadron continued in operations, contributing 17 Manchesters to Operation Milliennium the "1,000 aircraft" raid against Cologne on 30/31 May 1942. It lost two aircraft that night, one of which piloted by Flying Officer Leslie Thomas Manser who was posthumously awarded the Victoria Cross for pressing on with the attack after his aircraft was heavily damaged, and when a crash became inevitable, sacrificing his own life by remaining at the controls to allow the rest of his crew to parachute to safety.

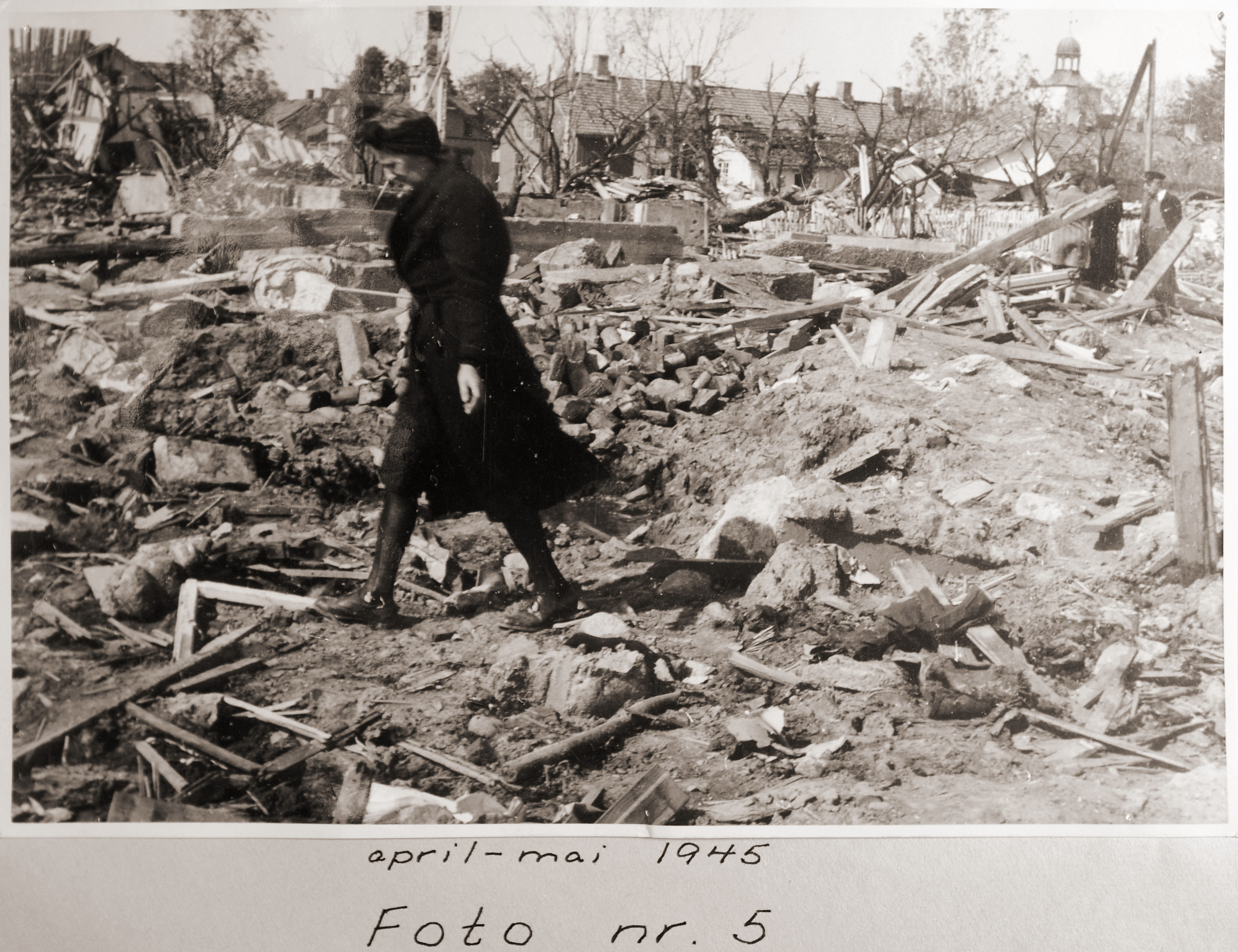
Photograph showing the destruction at Vallø after RAFs last major strategic raid

The squadron soon re-equipped with the four-engined Avro Lancaster, which it used for the rest of the war against German targets, flying its last mission of the war against an Oil Refinery at Vallø in Norway on 25/26 April 1945. The squadron flew 7,135 sorties during the war with a loss of 176 aircraft. It replaced its Lancasters with Avro Lincolns in 1946, disbanding at Waddington on 31 January 1951.

=== Jet operations ===
No 50 Squadron re-formed at RAF Binbrook on 15 August 1952, equipped with the English Electric Canberra light jet bomber. It moved to RAF Upwood in January 1956, disbanding on 1 October 1959.

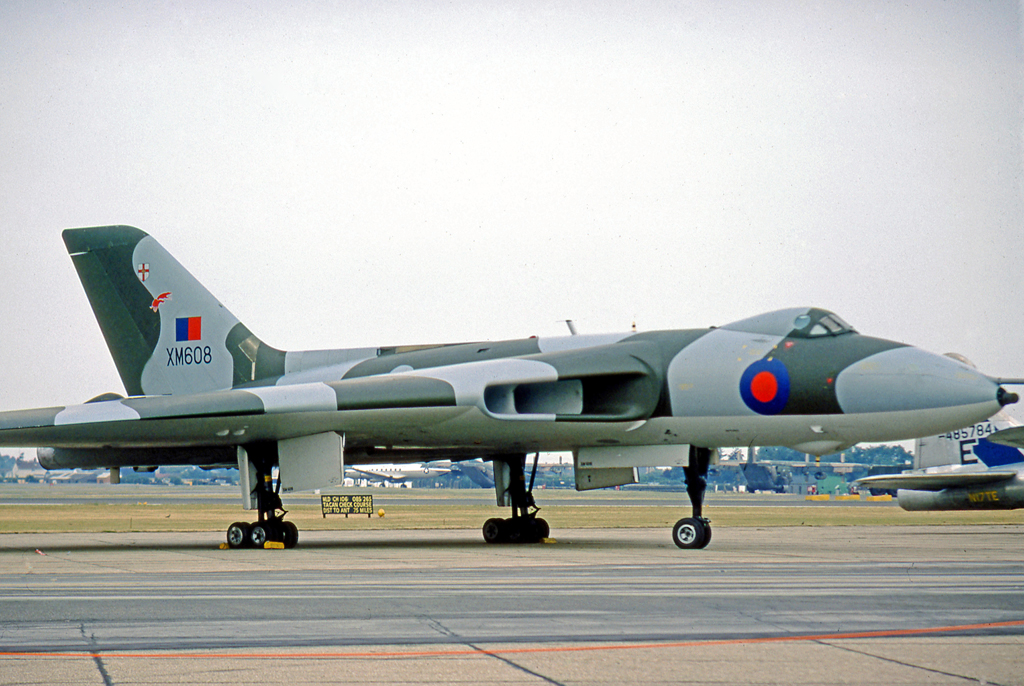
Avro Vulcan B.2 of No. 50 Squadron at RAF Mildenhall in 1976.

The squadron reformed again at RAF Waddington on 1 August 1962 equipped with the Avro Vulcan V bomber, using ex-617 Squadron aircraft made surplus after 617 Squadron re-equipped with Vulcan B.2s. It received Vulcan B.2s in December 1966, and was still operating them when the Falklands War broke out in April 1982, with two Vulcan crews from 50 Squadron selected for Operation Black Buck missions.

The Falklands War, and the continuing need to maintain supply flights to the South Atlantic after the end of the war, resulted in a shortage of air-to-air refuelling tankers, and it was decided to convert six Vulcans to single point tankers, the first conversion flying on 18 June 1982 and entering service on 23 June. No. 50 Squadron was selected as the operator of the tankers, serving as the last unit to operate the Vulcan until disbanding on 31 March 1984.

== Aircraft operated ==
Dates	Aircraft	Variant
May 1916 – September 1917	Royal Aircraft Factory B.E.2	B.E.2c
May 1916 – May 1918	Royal Aircraft Factory B.E.12	
June 1916 – July 1917	Vickers E.S.1	
December 1916 – August 1917	Royal Aircraft Factory B.E.12	B.E.12a
December 1916 – February 1918	Royal Aircraft Factory B.E.2	B.E.2e
March 1917 – March 1917	Bristol M.1	M.1B
May 1917 – June 1917	Royal Aircraft Factory R.E.8	
May 1917 – January 1918	Armstrong Whitworth F.K.8	
June 1917 – July 1917	Sopwith Pup	
January 1918 – June 1918	Royal Aircraft Factory B.E.12	B.E.12b
May 1918 – July 1918	Royal Aircraft Factory S.E.5	S.E.5a
July 1918 – June 1919	Sopwith Camel	
May 1937 – January 1939	Hawker Hind	
December 1938 – April 1942	Handley Page Hampden	
April 1942 – June 1942	Avro Manchester	
May 1942 – October 1946	Avro Lancaster	I & III
July 1946 – January 1951	Avro Lincoln	B.2
August 1952 – October 1959	English Electric Canberra	B.2
August 1961 – October 1966	Avro Vulcan	B.1
January 1966 – March 1984	Avro Vulcan	B.2
June 1982 – March 1984	Avro Vulcan	K.2

== Stations operated from ==
- Swingate Down: 1916
- Harrietsham: 1916–1918
- Bekesbourne: 1918–1919
- RAF Waddington: 1937–1940
- RAF Lindholme: 1940–1941
- RAF Swinderby: 1941–1942
- RAF Skellingthorpe: 1942–1945
- RAF Sturgate: 1945–1946
- RAF Waddington: 1946–1951
- RAF Binbrook: 1952–1956
- RAF Upwood: 1956–1959
- RAF Waddington: 1961–1984

== Bibliography ==
- Bruce, J. M. (1982). The Aeroplanes of the Royal Flying Corps (Military Wing). London: Putnam. ISBN 0-370-30084-X.
- Darling, Kev (2007). Avro Vulcan. RAF Illustrated. Vol. Part 1. Big Bird Aviation Publications. ISBN 978-1-84799-237-6.
- Falconer, Jonathan (2003). Bomber Command Handbook 1939–1945. Stroud, England: Sutton Publishing. ISBN 0-7509-3171-X.
- "Cologne Raid V.C." Flight. Vol. XLII, no. 1766. 29 October 1942. p. 474.
- Halley, James J. (1980). The Squadrons of the Royal Air Force. Tonbridge, Kent: Air Britain (Historians). ISBN 0-85130-083-9.
- Hastings, Max (1999). Bomber Command. London: Pan. ISBN 0-330-39204-2.
- Jefford, C G (1988). RAF Squadrons. A comprehensive record of the movement and equipment of all RAF squadrons and their antecedents since 1912. Shrewsbury: Airlife. ISBN 1-85310-053-6.
- Laming, Tim (2002). The Vulcan Story 1952–2002. Leicester, UK: Silverdale Books. ISBN 1-85605-701-1.
- Lewis, Peter (1959). Squadron Histories: R.F.C, R.N.A.S and R.A.F. 1912–59. London: Putnam.
- Matthews, Rupert (2012). 50 Squadron. Epsom: Bretwalda. ISBN 9781907791277.
- Pine, L. G. (1983). A dictionary of mottoes (1st ed.). London: Routledge & Kegan Paul. ISBN 0-7100-9339-X.
- Probert, Henry (2001). Bomber Harris: his life and times. Barnsley: Greenhill Books. ISBN 978-1-85367-473-0.
- Richards, Dennis (1953). Royal Air Force 1939–1945: Volume I: The Fight at Odds. London: HMSO.
- Richards, Dennis (1995). The Hardest Victory: RAF Bomber Command in the Second World War. London: Coronet. ISBN 0-340-61720-9.
