= Royal Aircraft Factory F.E.4 =

F.E.4

General information
- Type: Ground attack fighter
- National origin: United Kingdom
- Manufacturer: Royal Aircraft Factory
- Number built: 2

History
- First flight: 1916

The Royal Aircraft Factory F.E.4 was a twin-engine biplane aircraft built by the Royal Aircraft Factory in 1916. Intended as a cannon armed ground-attack aircraft, it was unsuccessful, only two being built.

== Design and development ==
Shortly after the outbreak of the First World War, the Royal Aircraft Factory began development of the F.E.4, a twin engined aircraft intended for ground attack to be armed with a COW autocannon.

The design had large two-bay biplane wings, with the longer upper wing fitted with strut-braced extensions that could be folded down during hangar storage. The lower wing was attached to the fuselage halfway up, so the aircraft sat close to the ground. In addition to the conventional landing gear there was a set of wheels mounted to the nose of the fuselage, to prevent damage if it tipped forward. The tailplane was large, with a central fin and two additional vertical surfaces for rudders.

The fuselage housed a crew of three, with the pilot and forward gunner sat in tandem in a large forward cockpit with dual controls. Despite a limited field of fire caused by being sat behind the pilot, the forward gunner was to be armed with two Lewis guns and a COW gun. A rear gunner sat behind the wings in a second cockpit.

The two engines, RAF 5s, were installed just above the lower wing in a pusher configuration.

The first F.E.4 was built in March 1916, and the second in July 1916. The second aircraft was fitted with Rolls-Royce engines, and did not include the rear cockpit. The intention was to put the rear gunner in an elevated section mounted above the wings, accessible by a ladder and hole in the upper wing, but this was never built.

Both aircraft were tested at Central Flying School beginning in May 1916, but neither performed well. In September 1916 the second F.E.4 was fitted with bomb-carrying equipment for further testing. Designs were created for engine upgrades, intended for RAF 3As, RAF 4As or RAF 4Bs, but no work was actually done.

== Specifications (RAF 5) ==
Data from Bruce, 1959. p 335.

General characteristics

- Crew: 3
- Length: 38 ft 2.5 in (11.65 m)
- Wingspan: 75 ft 2 in (23.49 m)
- Height: 16 ft 9 in (5.11 m)
- Wing area: 1,032 sq ft (95.9 m^{2})
- Empty weight: 3,754 lb (1,706 kg)
- Gross weight: 7,825 lb (3,557 kg)
- Powerplant: 2 × RAF 5 12-cylinder air-cooled V-12 piston engines , 150 hp (112 kW) each

Performance

- Maximum speed: 84.3 mph (136 km/h, 73.3 kn)
- Service ceiling: 12,000 ft (3,660 m)
- Rate of climb: 160 ft/min (0.81 m/s)

Armament

- 1× 1.5 pounder COW gun and 2× .303 in Lewis guns in front cockpit
- 1× Lewis gun in rear cockpit
