= Croye Pithey =

South African World War I flying ace

Croye Rothes Pithey
- Born: 19 August 1895; Colony of Natal
- Died: 21 February 1920 (aged 24)
- Military career
- Allegiance: United Kingdom: Union of South Africa
- Branch: Royal Flying Corps
- Rank: Lieutenant
- Unit: No. 12 Squadron RAF
- Awards: Distinguished Flying Cross with Bar

Lieutenant Croye Rothes Pithey DFC* (19 August 1895 – 21 February 1920) was a South African World War I flying ace credited with 10 aerial victories. He was one of the war's few bomber pilots to become a balloon buster; he may have been the only pilot to do it twice. He was also celebrated for his feats of visual and photographic reconnaissance under hazardous circumstances.

== Early life ==
Croye Rothes Pithey was born on 19 August 1895 in the Colony of Natal; his home of record in his military records was Rothesdale, Scheepersnek, Natal, South Africa.

He attended Maritzburg College, Pietermaritzburg, Kwa-Zulu Natal, South Africa from 15 April 1907 to 18 June 1908.

He worked as an accounting clerk in Johannesburg from June 1916 to May 1917; his fluency with Zulu may have been helpful. He then joined the Royal Flying Corps.

== World War I ==
On 13 September 1917, he was appointed as a second lieutenant in the Royal Flying Corps. After training, he was posted to 152 Squadron, but his stay with them was truncated by his hospitalization. After recovery, he was assigned to 12 Squadron on 17 April 1918 as a Royal Aircraft Factory RE.8 pilot. He was slightly wounded a week after his arrival. His first aerial success with his new unit came when he achieved the unusual feat of destroying an enemy observation balloon with a bomber on 7 May 1918. He and his observer Hervey Rhodes repeated the feat on 4 June. A triple victory three days later made them aces. Pithey was reported wounded on 15 August 1918. The crew of Pithey and Rhodes continued their victory streak through 3 September 1918, becoming the most successful aces to operate the clumsy and obsolete RE.8. On 27 September 1918, they were both wounded during a sortie, ending their flying career together. They had both earned a Distinguished Flying Cross, as well as each earning a Bar in lieu of a second award apiece.

== Post World War I ==
On 1 August 1919, he was granted a permanent commission in the reorganized Royal Air Force as a lieutenant.

On 21 February 1920 at 1406 hours, Pithey launched in favorable weather from Shotwick, leading a ferry formation of three towards Dublin. All three planes were seen between Denbigh and Rhyl in Wales shortly after departure. Pithey crashed fatally shortly thereafter.

R.A.F. Aeroplanes Missing THE Air Ministry regrets to announce that three aeroplanes which left Shotwick, near Chester, to fly to Baldonnel, near Dublin, on Saturday the 21st ultimo, are missing. The machines left Shotwick at 2.6 p.m., and should have arrived at Baldonnel by 4.30 p.m. The pilots were Flying Officer C. R. Pithey, D.F.C., Flying-Officer H. L. Holland, and Flying-Officer H. de W. Waller, all three experienced pilots. Flying-Officer Holland has made the trip previously. The machines were fitted with wireless, and were tested by the pilots before leaving. The weather was reported favourable on both sides of the Irish Channel. The machines started in formation. Flying-Officer Pithey leading, and were sighted between Denbigh and Rhyl shortly afterwards, but failed to arrive at Baldonnel. No further news was obtained until the morning of the 23rd ultimo, when a wireless message was received by the Admiralty from the master of the Norfolk Range dated the 21st ultimo, and reporting that an aeroplane had come down in the sea 85 miles S.W. of the Scilly Islands at 4.35 p.m. on that date. The message stated that the lifeboat was launched and every effort made to rescue the pilot, unfortunately without success owing to a rough sea and strong wind.

== Honours and awards ==
Text of citation for the Distinguished Flying Cross:

When on reconnaissance 8,000 yards behind the enemy lines he saw a hostile balloon on the ground; descending to 1,700 feet, he and his observer engaged and destroyed it. He then completed his reconnaissance. On another occasion, when on photography work, he was attacked by nine hostile scouts. By skilful manoeuvring he enabled his observer to shoot down three; the remaining six dispersed. He displays the greatest courage and determination in photographic and reconnaissance work.

— On another occasion, when on photography work, he was attacked by nine hostile scouts. By skilful manoeuvring he enabled his observer to shoot down three; the remaining six dispersed. He displays the greatest courage and determination in photographic and reconnaissance work., Supplement to the London Gazette, 3 August 1918 (30827/9202)

Text of citation for the Bar to the Distinguished Flying Cross:

Lieut. Pithey and his observer, Lieut. Rhodes, have crashed five enemy aeroplanes and driven down five out of control; in addition, they have shot down two balloons in flames, displaying conspicuous courage and skill on all occasions. On 1st September, they attacked an enemy two-seater on contact patrol; this machine at first retired east but returned, accompanied by six scouts, to the attack; after a short engagement they were driven off, and Lieut. Pithey, although his machine was badly shot about, continued his patrol and brought back a most valuable and accurate report. (Both D.F.C.'s gazetted 3rd August, 1918.)

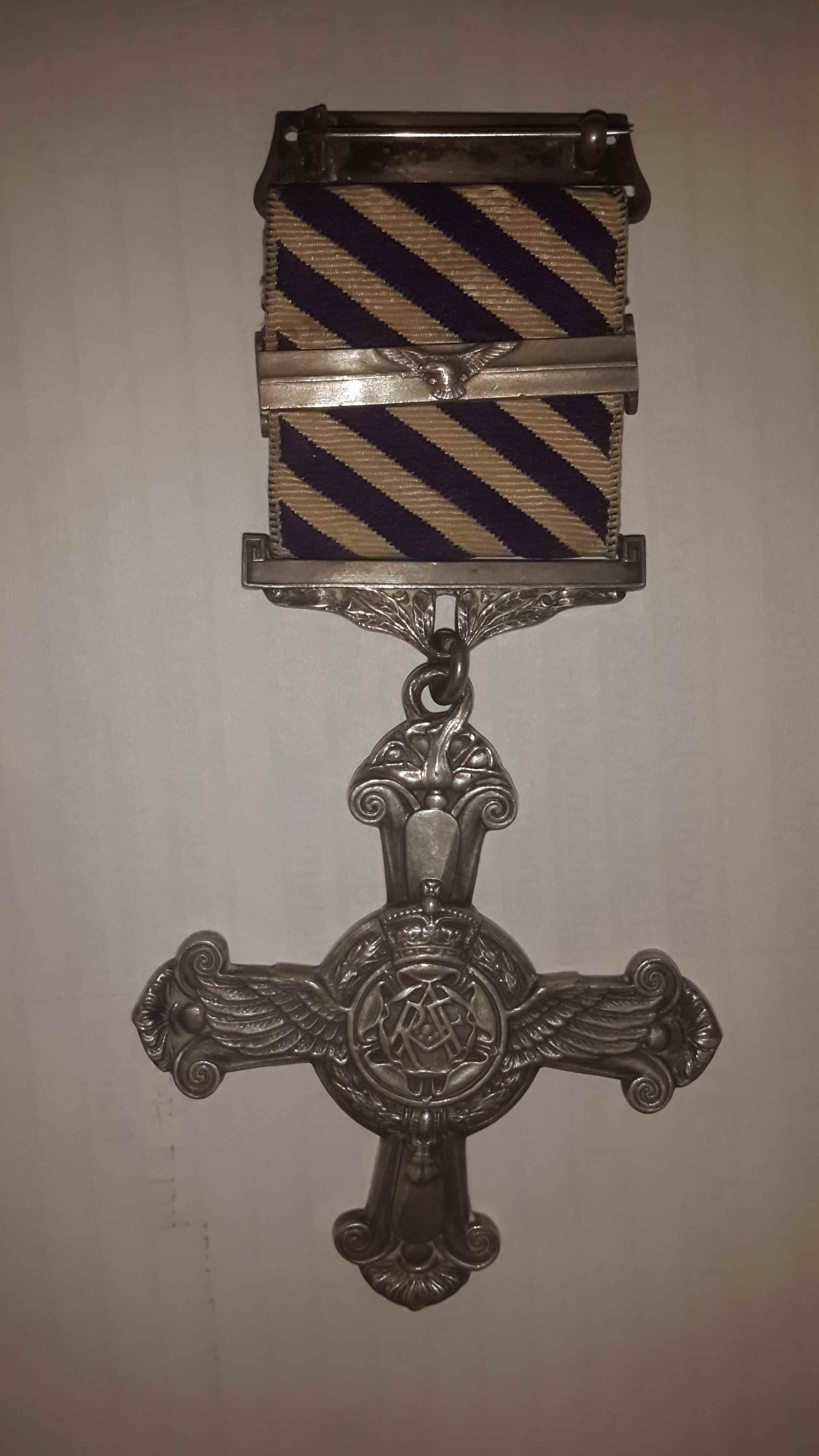
Front of Pithey's DFC medal

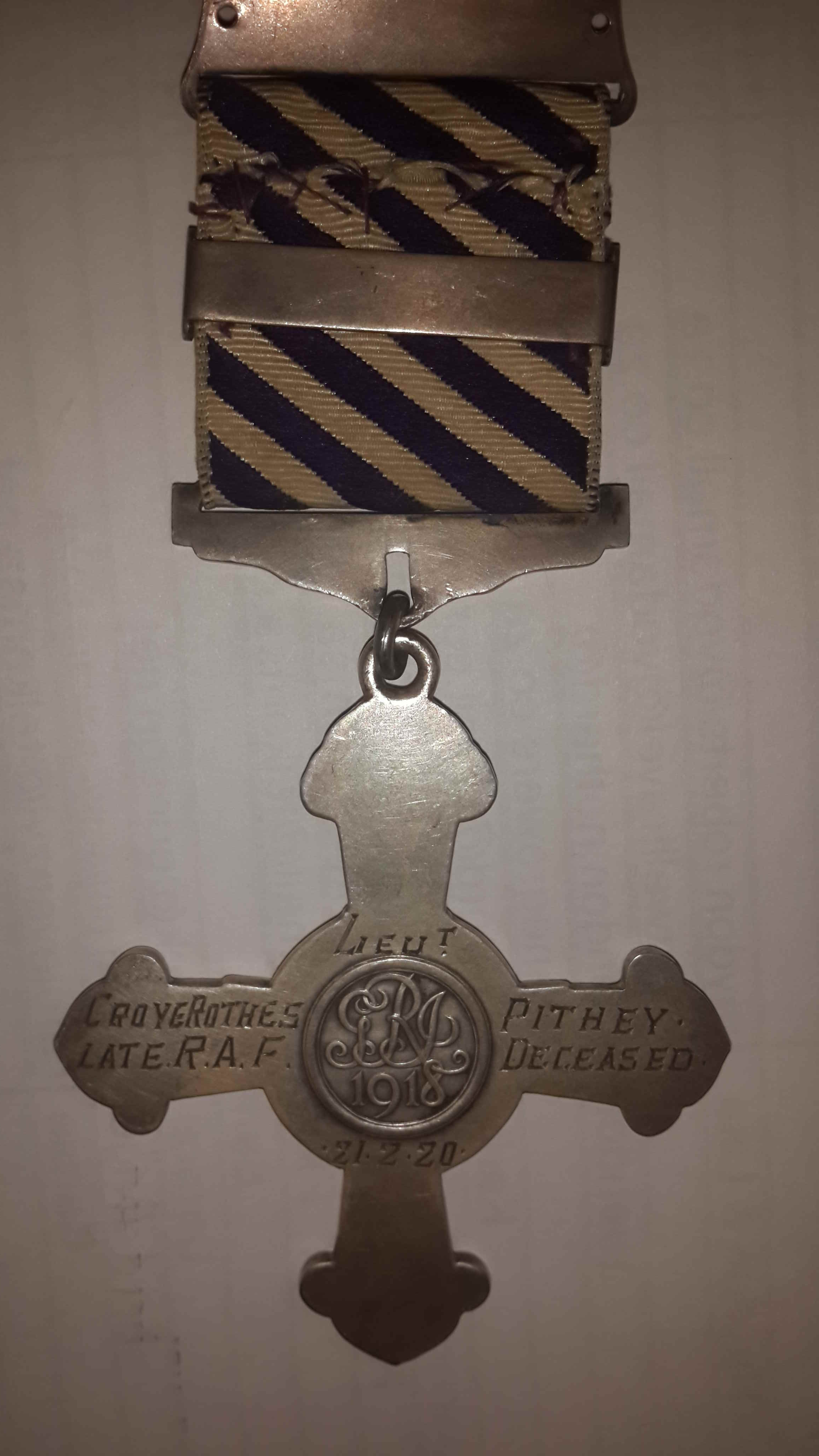
Rear of Pithey's DFC medal, with engraving

== List of aerial victories ==
See also Aerial victory standards of World War I

Croye Pithey's observer/gunner for all victories was Hervey Rhodes.

No.	Date/time	Aircraft	Foe	Result	Location	Notes
1	7 May 1918	Royal Aircraft Factory RE.8 two-seater reconnaissance plane	Observation balloon	Destroyed by fire		
2	4 June 1918 @ 0845 hours	Royal Aircraft Factory RE.8	Observation balloon	Destroyed by fire		
3	7 June 1918 @ 0920 hours	Royal Aircraft Factory RE.8 serial number B7715	Pfalz D.III fighter	Destroyed	Map grid 57C B8	
4	7 June 1918 @ 0920 hours	Royal Aircraft Factory RE.8 s/n B7715	Pfalz D.III fighter	Driven down out of control	Map grid 57C B8	
5	7 June 1918 @ 0920 hours	Royal Aircraft Factory RE.8 s/n B7715	Pfalz D.III fighter	Driven down out of control	Map grid 57C B8	
6	21 August 1918 @ 1130 hours	Royal Aircraft Factory RE.8 s/n E47	Fokker D.VII fighter	Driven down out of control	Béhagnies, France	
7	23 August 1918 @ 1740 hours	Royal Aircraft Factory RE.8	LVG two-seater reconnaissance plane	Destroyed by fire	Boyelles, France	
8	28 August 1918 @ 0945 hours	Royal Aircraft Factory RE.8 s/n F6097	DFW two-seater reconnaissance plane	Destroyed	East of Saint-Léger, France	
9	30 August 1918 @ 1650 hours	Royal Aircraft Factory RE.8 s/n F6097	Fokker D.VII fighter	Destroyed by fire	Bullecourt, France	
10	3 September 1918 @ 1715 hours	Royal Aircraft Factory RE.8 s/n F6097	LVG two-seater reconnaissance plane	Destroyed	Lagnicourt-Marcel, France	

== See also ==
- List of people who disappeared mysteriously at sea
