= Siddeley-Deasy =

British automobile, aero engine & aircraft company

Siddeley-Deasy Motor Car Company Limited
- Industry: Engineering
- Founded: 1912
- Defunct: 1919
- Fate: Merged with Armstrong Siddeley
- Key people: John Siddeley, 1st Baron Kenilworth

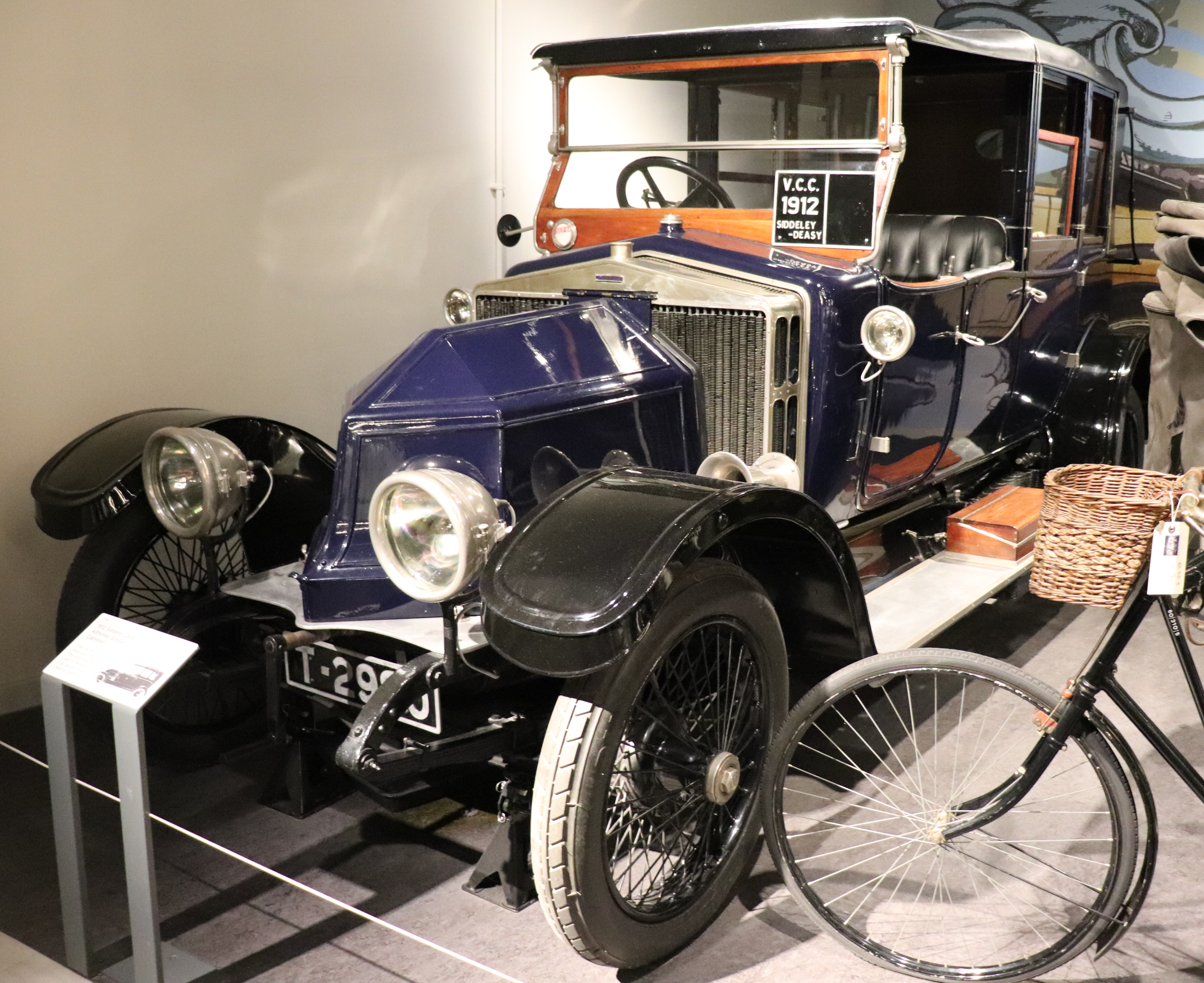
1912 Siddeley-Deasy 18-24 Althorpe Special Cabriolet

The Siddeley-Deasy Motor Car Company Limited was a British automobile, aero engine and aircraft company based in Coventry in the early 20th century. It was central to the formation, by merger and buy-out, of the later Armstrong Siddeley Motor and Armstrong Whitworth Aircraft companies.

== History ==
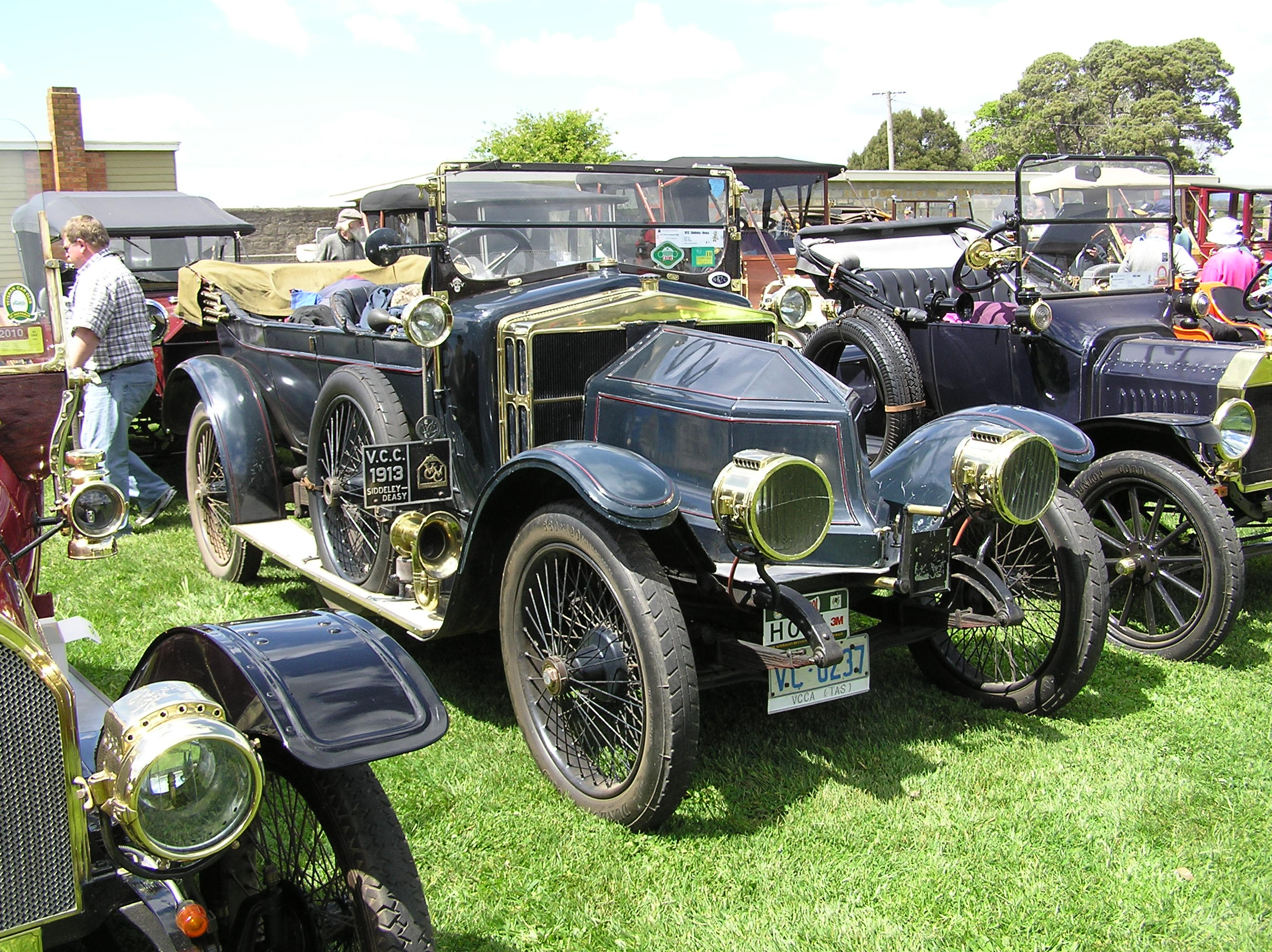
Siddeley-Deasy 18-24hp; 1913 example sold new to G Fysh of Launceston, Tasmania

The Deasy Motor Car Manufacturing Company Limited was founded by Henry Hugh Peter Deasy in the factory that had previously been used to manufacture Iden cars. Deasy left in 1908 following disagreements with his Chief Engineer. In 1910 J D Siddeley took up the appointment of managing director having moved to Deasy in 1909 from managing Wolseley. The shareholders were so pleased with his success that on 7 November 1912 they unanimously agreed to change the company's name to The Siddeley-Deasy Motor Car Company Limited. Siddeley's name had been added to the product's radiator in 1912.

Siddeley-Deasy grew rapidly using Rover chassis and Daimler and Aster engines. They also established a separate brand, Stoneleigh, at first, in 1912, by mounting a different radiator and bonnet on a BSA 13.9 hp product but in the 1920s a quite separate car was produced and sold under the Stoneleigh name. Described as a nippy performer its quarter-elliptic springs gave it a curious bounding motion. The Wholesale Cooperative Society took them as vans.

== First World War ==
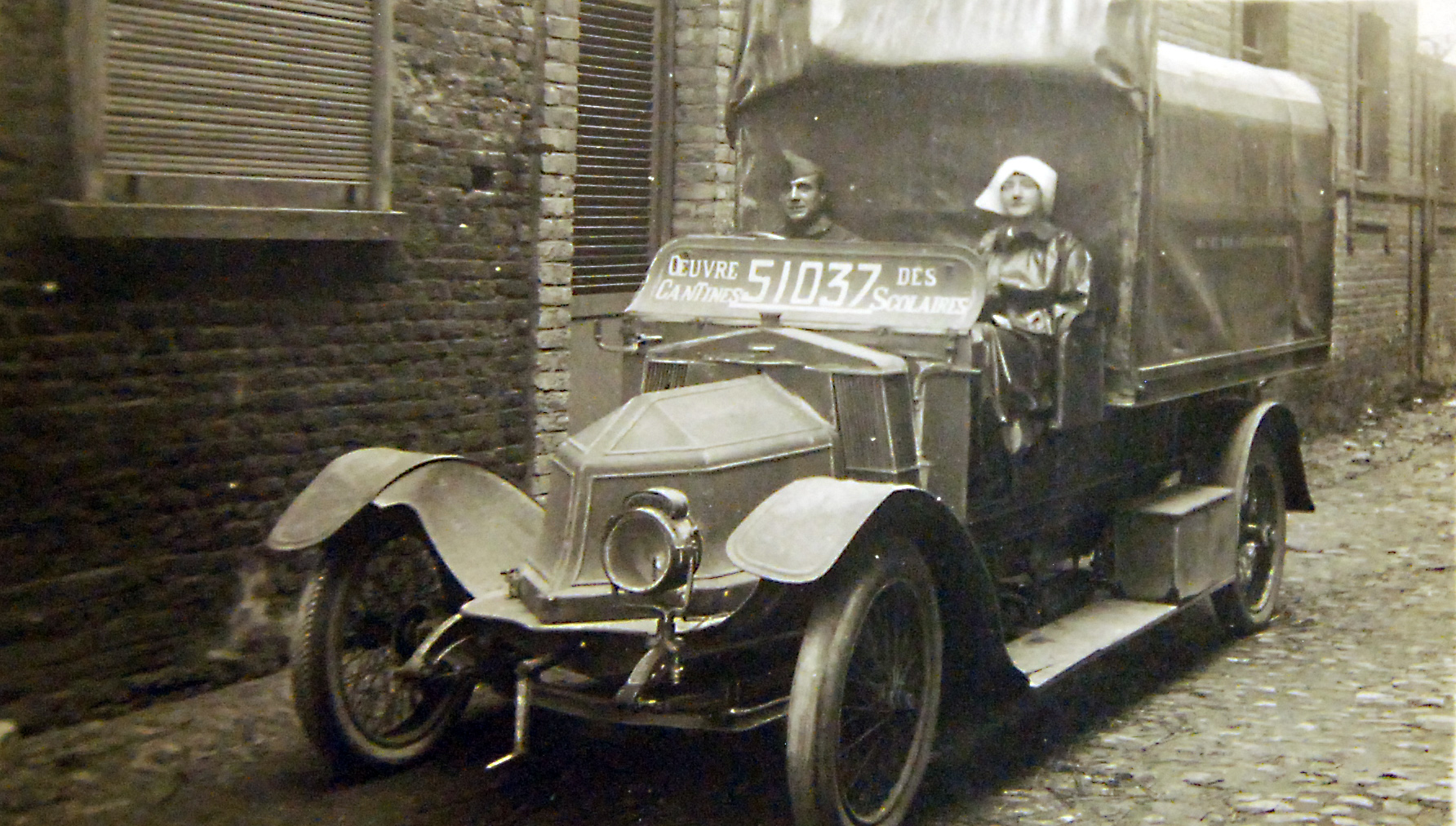
Siddeley-Deasy ambulance, WWI

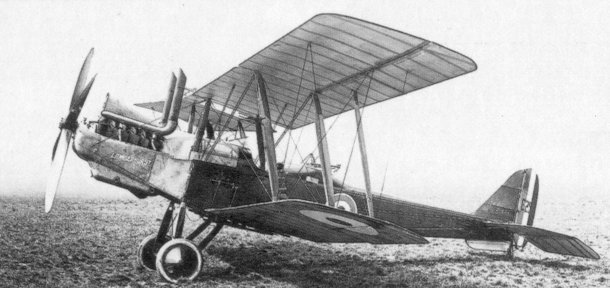
RE 8.1

During the First World War, Siddeley-Deasy grew to have 5,000 workers producing ambulances and aircraft engines, which included the Puma, a water-cooled, straight-6 and the Tiger. The latter was a water-cooled V-12, basically two Pumas on a common crankshaft. They were one of six companies to produce the Royal Aircraft Factory R.E.8 aircraft from 1916. In 1917 three staff from the Royal Aircraft Factory joined Siddeley-Deasy and began to design fixed-wing aircraft. They were S. D. Heron, an engine designer, F. M. Green, who became the chief engineer, and John Lloyd, who became chief aircraft designer. These last two stayed with Siddeley Deasy and its successor for many years. During 1917–18 the team, led by Lloyd, designed three aircraft, one of which, the Siskin, became well known.

== Armstrong Siddeley ==
After the war, conditions for manufacturers were difficult, and in 1919 Siddeley suggested a merger with Sir W G Armstrong Whitworth & Co Limited Motor Car Department. Armstrong-Whitworth had been a supplier of Siddeley-Deasy engine castings and they had themselves made aircraft, chiefly designed by Frederick Koolhoven who left the company in 1917 and then by F. M Murphy. By 1919 they had decided to abandon aircraft manufacture and shed the associated staff. Armstrong Whitworth acquired a controlling interest in The Siddeley-Deasy Motor Car Company Limited and changed its name to The Armstrong Siddeley Company Limited.

Armstrong Siddeley produced radial aircraft engines throughout its life, together with turbojets after the war. In April 1920 or slightly later, it produced its own subsidiary, The Sir W.G. Armstrong Whitworth Aircraft Co. Ltd. This last company went on to produce Siskin fighters in large numbers, together with all the later Armstrong Whitworth designs.

In March 1927, John Siddeley bought the parent Armstrong Whitworth Development Co. Ltd. and its subsidiaries from Armstrong Whitworth, renaming it The Armstrong Siddeley Development Co. Ltd. The name of the aircraft subsidiary, Sir W.G. Armstrong Whitworth Aircraft Co. Ltd. remained the same. John Siddeley reported that since 1919 his company had each year produced more 6-cylinder car engines than any other European producer. The two key members of the Siddeley Deasy design team stayed with the renamed company for many years. John Lloyd was chief designer until 1948 and retired as technical director in 1959. F. M. Green retired in 1933.

== Products ==
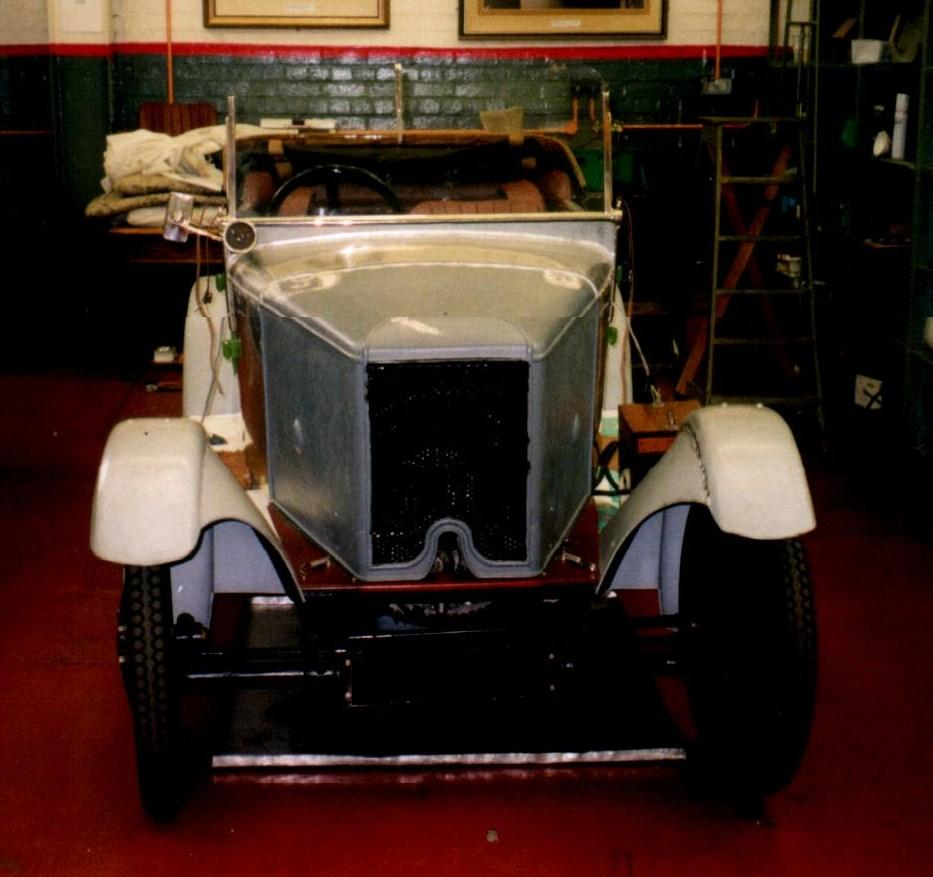
Stoneleigh 9 h.p. 1923 example name changed for 1924 to Armstrong Siddeley 14/4

=== Cars ===
The J D Siddeley Type Deasy Car for 1911 Four models with seven standard styles of coachwork

"The highest-grade British car of moderate power"

- 12-16 hp 4-cyl poppet valve 75x110 = 1944 cc £385
- 14-20 hp 4-cyl poppet valve 80x130 = 2614 cc £375
- 16-20 hp 6-cyl sleeve valve 90x130 = 4962 cc £445 (the Silent Knight engine was introduced in late 1911)
- 18-24 hp 6-cyl sleeve valve 90x130 = 4962 cc £685
- 1912 Stoneleigh 13.9 hp 4-cyl sleeve-valve 75x114 = 2015 cc

=== Aero-engines ===
- Siddeley Puma
- Siddeley Tiger

=== Aircraft ===
- Siddeley-Deasy R.T.1
- Armstrong Whitworth Siskin
- Siddeley-Deasy Sinaia

== See also ==
- List of aircraft engine manufacturers

== Bibliography ==
- Tapper, Oliver (1973). Armstrong Whitworth Aircraft since 1913. Putnam Publishing. ISBN 978-0-370-10004-3.
- Cook, Ray (1988). Armstrong Siddeley : the Parkside Story 1896-1939. Rolls-Royce Heritage Trust. ISBN 9780951171035.
