= Boulton Paul P.9 =

P.9
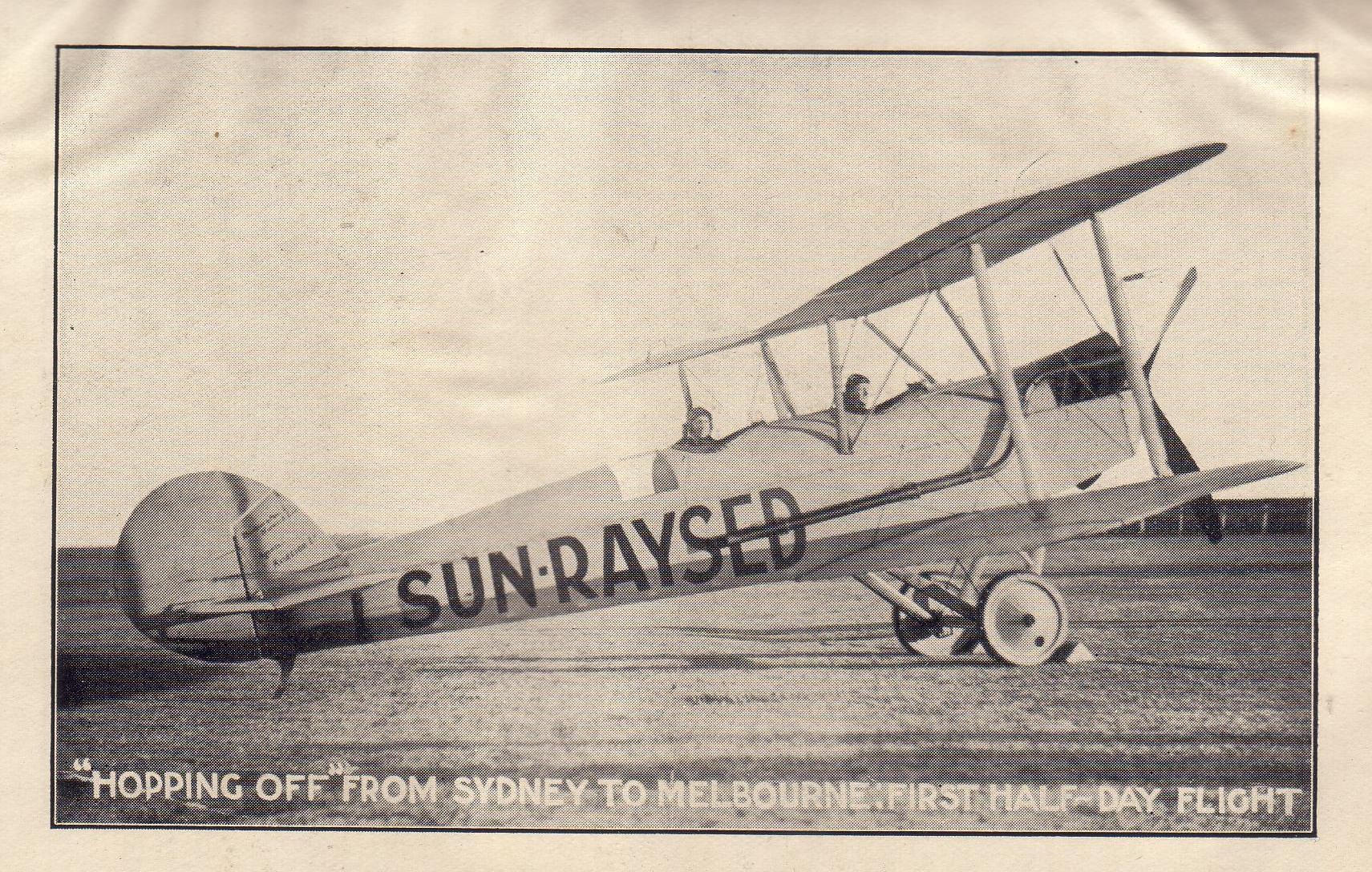

General information
- Type: Light utility aircraft
- Manufacturer: Boulton & Paul Ltd
- Status: retired
- Number built: 8

History
- First flight: May 1919
- Developed from: Boulton & Paul P.6

The Boulton & Paul P.9 was a British single-engined two-seat biplane aircraft built by Boulton & Paul Ltd.

== Design and development ==
The P.9 was an enlarged development of the P.6 single-engined biplane, with a 6 ft (1.8 m) longer fuselage and a 2 ft 6 in (0.76 m) increase in span. It used the same 90 hp (67 kW) RAF 1 V-8 engine as the P.6 but with an increased fuel capacity. The wings and fuselage were constructed of wood with fabric covering.

The first order was from A.L. Long for use on a sheep station in Australia and the first aircraft was delivered to Australia where it was used on newspaper delivery flights. On 17 December 1919, it made the first flight across the Bass Strait between Tasmania and the mainland. Minor changes were then made to production aircraft, including a compartment behind the cockpit to carry two specially-built suitcases. Although the aircraft was offered at £700, with an old but still commonly available engine, it failed to compete with war-surplus military aircraft and only eight aircraft were built, including five that went to Australia.

== Specifications ==
Data from British Civil Aircraft since 1919

General characteristics

- Crew: 1
- Capacity: 1 passenger
- Length: 24 ft 8 in (7.52 m)
- Wingspan: 27 ft 6 in (8.38 m)
- Height: 10 ft 0 in (3.05 m)
- Wing area: 323 sq ft (30.0 m^{2})
- Empty weight: 1,244 lb (564 kg)
- Gross weight: 1,770 lb (803 kg)
- Powerplant: 1 × R.A.F. 1A air-cooled V-8 engine, 90 hp (67 kW)

Performance

- Maximum speed: 104 mph (167 km/h, 90 kn)
- Cruise speed: 85 mph (137 km/h, 74 kn)
- Range: 300 mi (480 km, 260 nmi)
- Service ceiling: 14,000 ft (4,300 m)
- Rate of climb: 650 ft/min (3.3 m/s)

Aircraft of comparable role, configuration, and era

- Airco DH.6
- Avro 504
- Curtiss Jenny
- DFW C.V
- Standard J-1
- Nieuport 83
