= BE9 =

BE9 or BE-9 may refer to:

- Beryllium-9 (Be-9 or ^{9}Be), an isotope of beryllium
- Royal Aircraft Factory B.E.9, a British aircraft of World War I
