= RAF 3 =

British aircraft engine

- RAF 3a on display at the Polish Aviation Museum
- Type: Piston inline aero engine
- National origin: United Kingdom
- Manufacturer: Royal Aircraft Factory
- First run: September 1914
- Major applications: Royal Aircraft Factory R.E.7
- Number built: 289
- Developed from: RAF 1
- Developed into: RAF 4

The RAF 3 is a British liquid-cooled, V12 engine developed for aircraft use during World War I. Based on the eight–cylinder RAF 1 it was designed by the Royal Aircraft Factory but produced by the two British companies of Armstrong Whitworth and Napier & Son. The RAF 7 was a high compression version of the same engine.

== Variants ==
RAF 3
1914 - Prototype engine, 200 horsepower (150 kW).
RAF 3a
1914 - Main production variant, increased bore, 260 horsepower (194 kW). 29 built by Armstrong Whitworth, 260 built by Napier & Son.
RAF 7
300 horsepower (224 kW) high compression version with high-lift camshafts.

== Applications ==
- Airco DH.4
- Royal Aircraft Factory R.E.7

== Specifications (RAF 3a) ==
Data from Lumsden

=== General characteristics ===
- Type: 12-cylinder, upright, 60-degree Vee engine
- Bore: 4.5 in (114.3 mm)
- Stroke: 5.5 in (140 mm)
- Displacement: 1,049.4 cu in (17.24 L)
- Dry weight: 780 lb (354 kg)

=== Components ===
- Valvetrain: Overhead valve, both valves operated by a single pushrod
- Cooling system: Liquid-cooled
- Reduction gear: 0.5:1, left-hand tractor

=== Performance ===
- Power output: 260 hp (194 kW) at 1,750 rpm (takeoff power)
- Specific power: 0.25 hp/cu in (11.25 kW/L)
- Compression ratio: 5.3:1
- Power-to-weight ratio: 0.33 hp/lb (0.54 kW/kg)

== See also ==
Related development

- RAF 1
- RAF 4

Comparable engines

- Rolls-Royce Eagle
- Rolls-Royce Falcon

Related lists

- List of aircraft engines
