= Armstrong Whitworth F.K.3 =

British military biplane

F.K.3
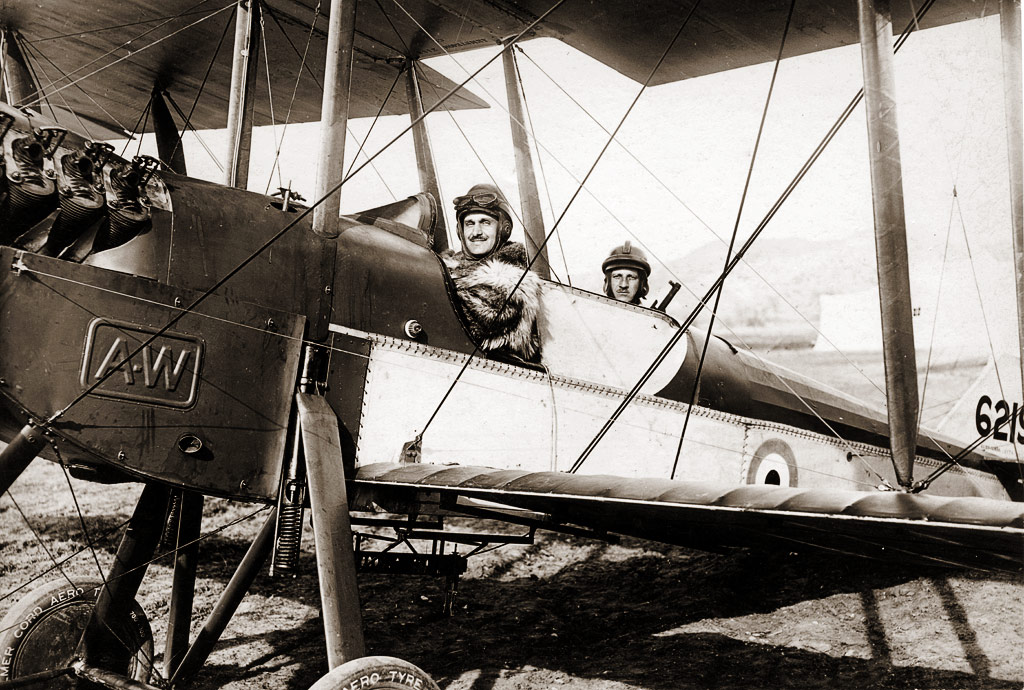

General information
- Type: General purpose / Trainer aircraft
- Manufacturer: Armstrong Whitworth Aircraft
- Designer: Frederick Koolhoven
- Primary user: Royal Flying Corps
- Number built: c.500

History
- Manufactured: 1915–1917
- First flight: 1915
- Developed from: Royal Aircraft Factory BE.2

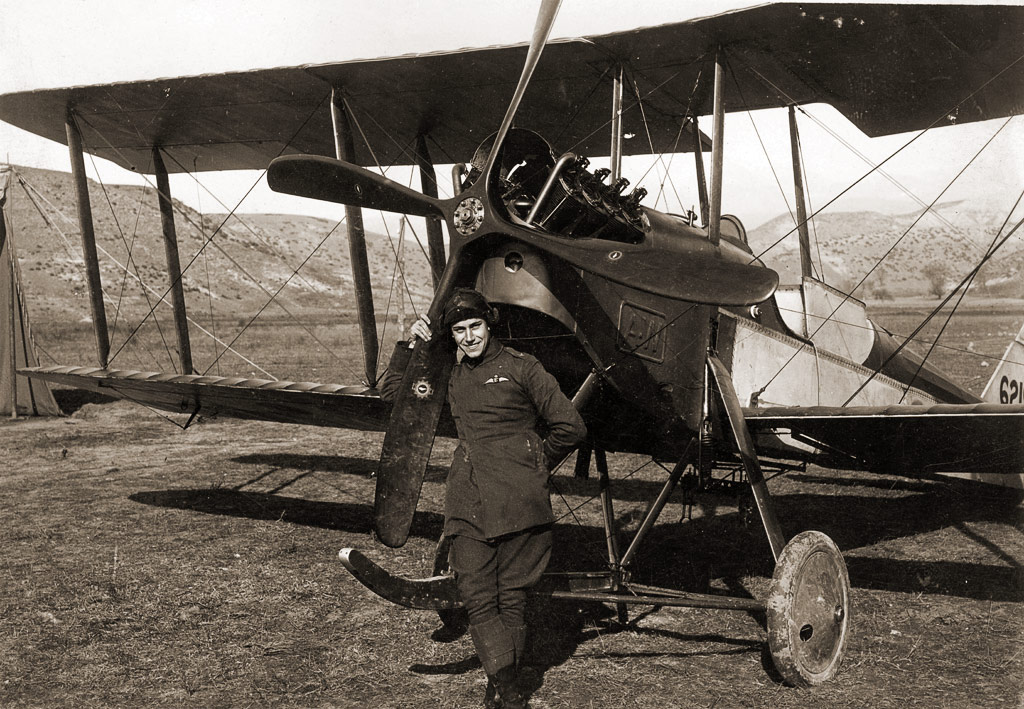
A British pilot, possibly 2nd Lt. A.C. Stopher from No. 47 Squadron RAF, Thessalonika with FK.3

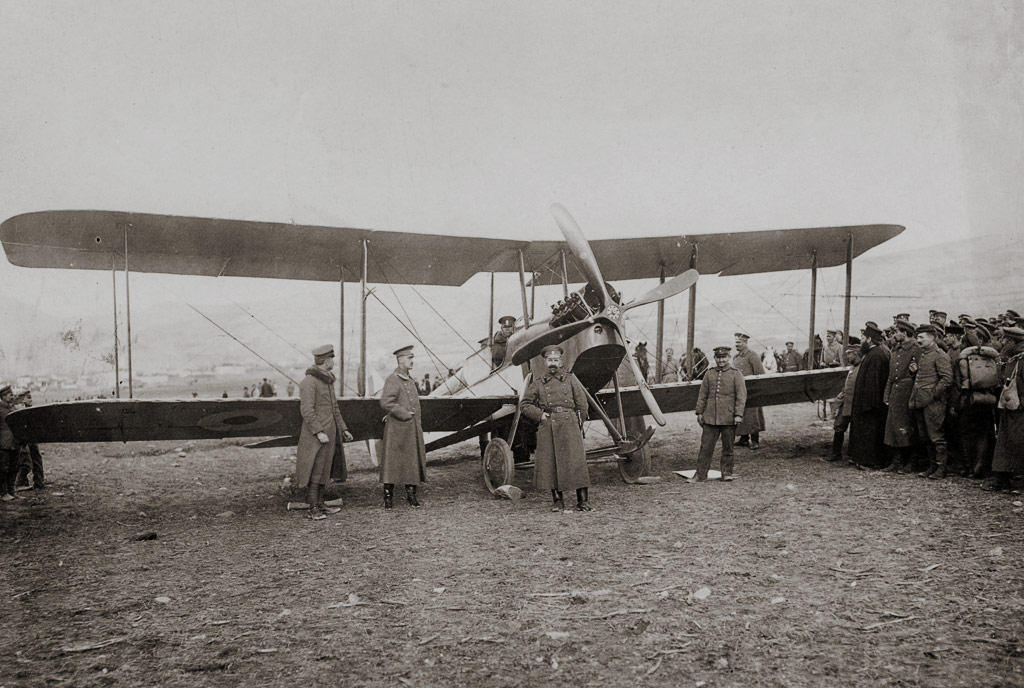
Bulgarian Aviation Corps Officers and soldiers gathered around a captured FK.3 in 1917.

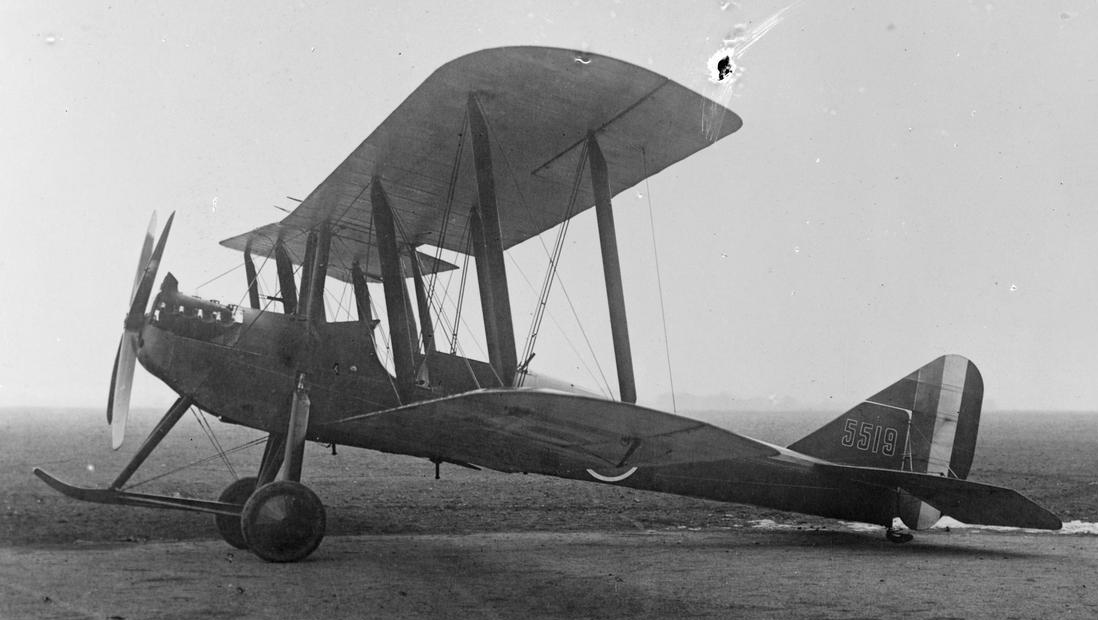
Armstrong Whitworth F.K.3 in 1915

The Armstrong Whitworth F.K.3 was a British two-seat general-purpose biplane built by Armstrong Whitworth Aircraft during the First World War. By the end of the war it was considered obsolete for combat.

== History ==
The Dutch aircraft designer Frederick Koolhoven joined Armstrong Whitworth in 1914. He designed a series of aircraft that had his initials in their designation. The F.K.3 followed the basic layout of the Royal Aircraft Factory B.E.2c, which Armstrong Whitworth were building for the Royal Flying Corps. It was designed as an improvement, with a simplified structure that was easier to build. The prototype, first flown by Norman Spratt was powered by a 70 hp (52 kW) air-cooled Renault 70 hp V-8. This aircraft differed from the B.E.2 in eliminating welded joints and complex metal components in the structure, and having greater dihedral on the upper wing. It retained the seating layout of the B.E.2, with separate cockpits for the pilot and observer, with the latter in front. An initial batch of seven aircraft to this standard, sometimes referred to as the F.K.2 were built.

This initial batch offered little improvement over the BE.2, and was rejected for service in France. Aircraft following this initial batch were completed to a revised design, with a new fin and rudder, its leading edge straight and lacking the earlier comma shaped horn balance, and powered by the Renault-related but more powerful 90 hp (67 kW) RAF 1a engine. Both crew were placed in a single, extended cockpit with the pilot forward, allowing the observer a more effective field of fire, although in the event few F.K.3s were flown with armament. Trials at Upavon in May 1916 proved that the F.K.3 had a better performance in some respects than the B.E.2c, although it had a smaller useful load. Armstrong Whitworth were given a contract to build 150 aircraft with another 350 being built by Hewlett & Blondeau Limited at Luton. Some of the early batch had twin high exhaust pipes that exited above the upper wing in B.E.2 style, but these were later replaced with rams' horns forward stubs.

At one time during production of the F.K.3 there was a shortage of the RAF engines, and twelve aircraft were fitted with longer and heavier 120 hp (90 kW) six-cylinder inline water cooled Beardmore 120 hp. To carry the extra weight, span was increased by 2 ft (610 mm), but though the extra power enhanced the climb rate, top speed was little changed and these machines were converted back to RAF engines when they became available.

== Operational Service ==
The F.K.3 was not adopted for use by operational squadrons of the RFC in France, as the more capable F.K.8 and R.E.8 were both already in prospect. Only one overseas unit received the F.K.3 (which was 47 Squadron at Salonika), all the other aircraft were based in the United Kingdom. Most of the aircraft were used for training until replaced by the Avro 504.

== Military operators ==
Australia

- Australian Flying Corps
  - No. 3 Squadron AFC – Used for training.

Bulgaria

- Bulgarian Air Force
  - One aircraft, No. 6219 captured in 1917

United Kingdom –

- Royal Flying Corps/Royal Air Force
  - No. 43 Squadron RFC
  - No. 47 Squadron RFC
  - No. 53 Squadron RFC
  - No. 55 Squadron RFC
  - No. 63 Squadron RFC

== Specifications (F.K.3) ==
Data from The British Bomber since 1914

General characteristics

- Crew: 2
- Length: 29 ft 0 in (8.84 m)
- Wingspan: 40 ft 0 5/8 in (12.208 m)
- Height: 11 ft 10 3/4 in (3.626 m)
- Wing area: 442 sq ft (41.1 m^{2})
- Empty weight: 1,386 lb (629 kg)
- Gross weight: 2,056 lb (933 kg)
- Fuel capacity: 28 imp gal (34 US gal; 130 L)
- Powerplant: 1 × RAF 1A air-cooled V-8 engine, 90 hp (67 kW)

Performance

- Maximum speed: 87 mph (140 km/h, 76 kn) at sea level
- Endurance: 3 hr
- Service ceiling: 12,000 ft (3,700 m)
- Time to altitude: 19 min to 5,000 ft (1,500 m)

Armament

- Guns: 1 × 0.303 in (7.7 mm) Lewis Gun in rear cockpit
- Bombs: up to 112 lb (51 kg) bombs (if flown as single seater)

== See also ==
Related development

- F.K.8
