= Airco DH.6 =

1916 trainer biplane

DH.6
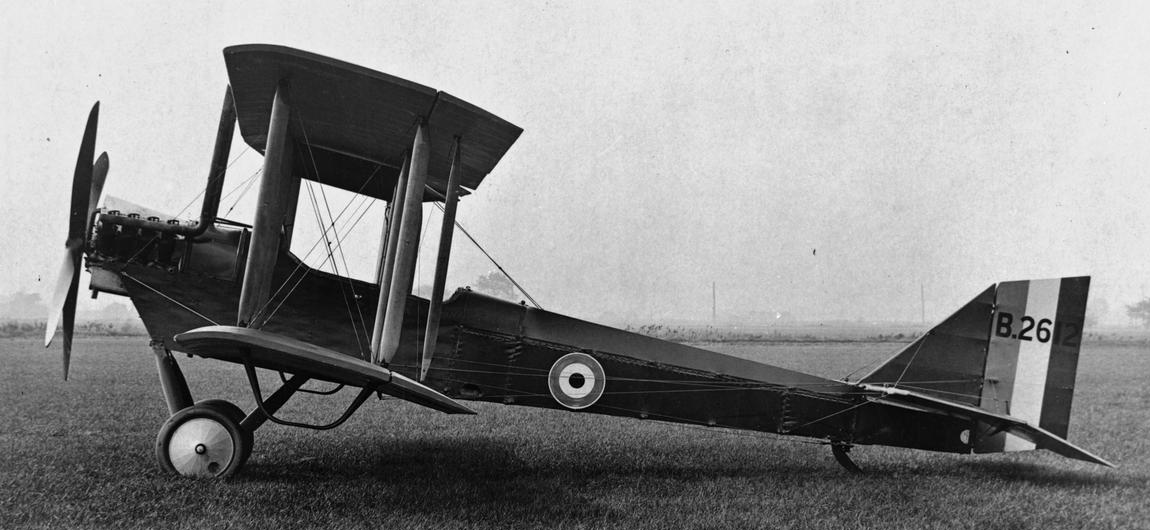

General information
- Type: Trainer
- National origin: United Kingdom
- Manufacturer: Airco
- Designer: Geoffrey de Havilland
- Status: retired
- Primary users: Royal Flying Corps Royal Air Force
- Number built: over 2,280

History
- First flight: 1916

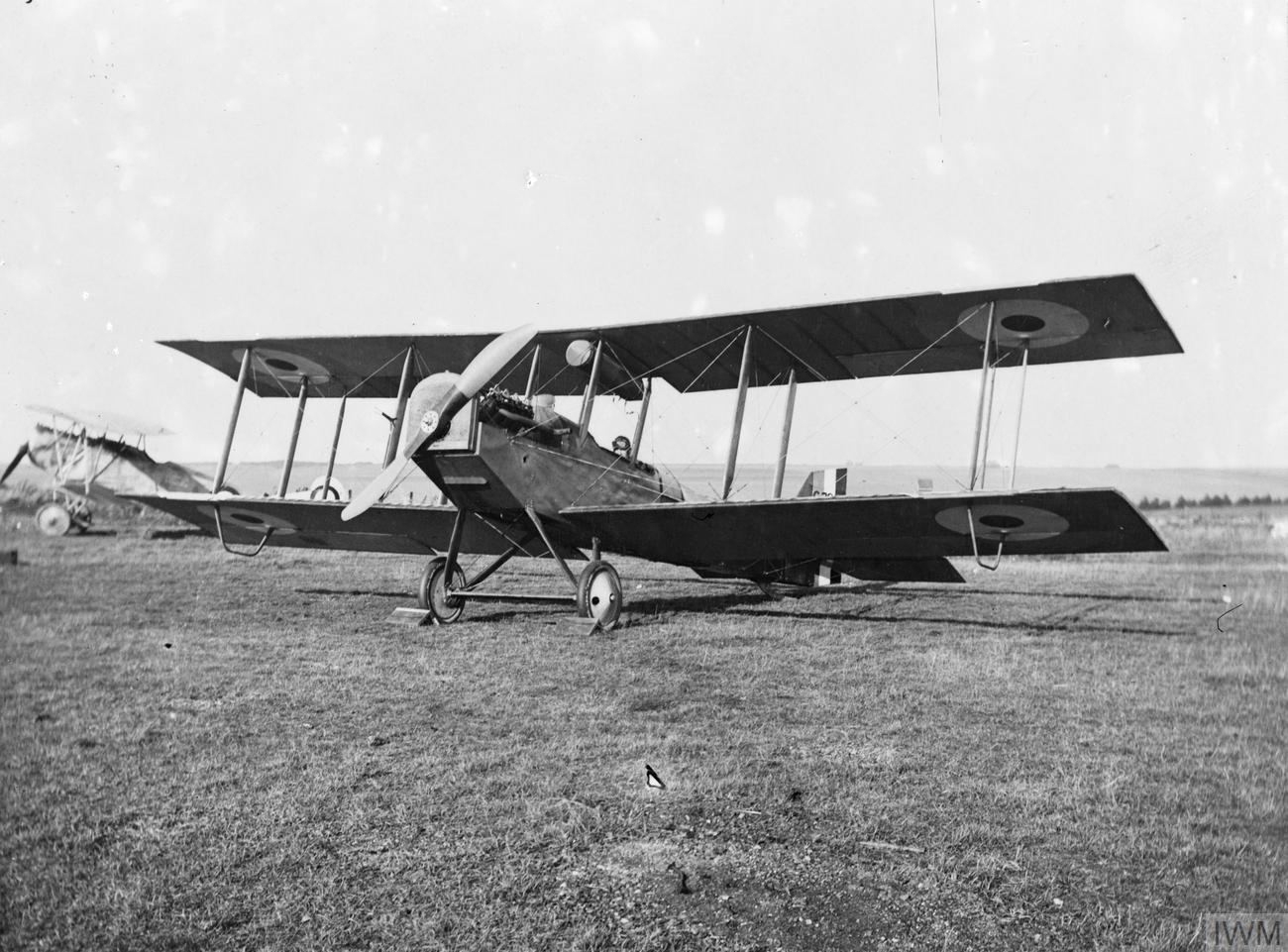
DH.6 two-seater biplane.

The Airco DH.6 was a British military trainer biplane used by the Royal Flying Corps during the First World War. Known by various nicknames, including the "Clutching hand" and "Skyhook", many survived to be used as a civil light aircraft in the postwar era.

== Design and development ==
The DH.6 was specifically designed as a military trainer, at a time when it was usual for obsolete service types to be used in this role. Geoffrey de Havilland seems to have had two design criteria in mind. The first was that it should be inexpensive and easy to build, and above all, simple to repair after the mishaps common in training units. The top and bottom wings were square-cut and interchangeable, hence roundels often located in unusual positions. They were heavily cambered, and braced with cables rather than streamlined wires. On the original version of the type there was no stagger. Even the fin and rudder, on the prototype of the usual curved de Havilland outline, were cut square on production machines. The fuselage structure was a straight box with no attempt at refinement of outline – instructor and pupil sat in tandem on basketwork seats in a single cockpit, spartan even by the standards of the time. The standard engine was the readily available 90 hp (67 kW) RAF 1a. Because of its use in the B.E.2 the engine was familiar to RFC mechanics. No cowling was used, and upswept straight exhaust pipes were fitted. When stocks of the RAF 1a ran short, other engines were fitted, including the 80 hp (60 kW) Renault.

The second design criterion was that the new trainer should be relatively safe to fly, both for the student and his instructor. RFC instructors at the time referred to student pilots as "Huns" (the term normally applied to German airmen) and casualties at training schools were high. To improve safety the instructor could decouple the student's controls to avoid having to wrestle with him. The new trainer's flying characteristics were selected to achieve the desired safety. De Havilland had carried out extensive research into stability and control in aircraft while with the Royal Aircraft Factory, which helped in designing a safe but deliberately unstable aircraft. As a result, the DH.6 had very gentle flying characteristics and was probably the most "forgiving" aircraft of its time, allowing itself to be flown "crab wise" in improperly banked turns and able to maintain sustained flight at speeds as low as 30 miles per hour (48 km/h).

In fact, the DH.6 was described as "too safe" to make a good trainer, as its reaction to inexpert piloting was too gentle to prepare pilots for combat aircraft such as the Sopwith Camel, whose handling was unusually difficult even for the era. With its low power, strong construction and lack of streamlining, its maximum speed was very low.

=== Wartime production ===
At least 2,282 DH.6s were built in the UK during the war, out of orders of about 3,000. Besides Airco, batches were built by Grahame-White, Kingsbury Aviation, Harland and Wolff, Morgan, Savages, Ransomes, Sims & Jefferies, and Gloucestershire. A single DH.6 was constructed in July 1917 by Canadian Aeroplanes Ltd. as a prototype for projected production, should supply of the Curtiss JN-4 (Can) prove inadequate, and it was the first British-designed aircraft built in Canada. In the event, the expected shortage of "Canucks" never materialized and only one example was built.

== Operational history ==
In 1917, training of RFC pilots began to receive a long overdue overhaul. The School of Special Flying at Gosport in Hampshire was established by Maj. Robert R. Smith-Barry with the aim of making flight instructors into specially trained experts – rather than entrusting the role to novices who had barely completed their own training, and operational pilots being "rested" to recover from combat fatigue. The Avro 504K was adopted as the standard trainer by the end of 1917, with the DH.6 becoming surplus as far as training was concerned.

At the end of 1917, about 300 DH.6s were transferred to the RNAS for anti-submarine patrols. While far from ideal for this work, the type proved surprisingly "seaworthy", being known to float for as long as ten hours after ditching. On operations, the underpowered trainer could not carry both an observer and weaponry. The majority of patrols were flown solo, allowing a token bomb load and a lightweight radio installation to be carried, although convoy escort missions generally carried an observer who could communicate with ships using an Aldis lamp. The "built in" instability designed to keep a student pilot alert proved tiring for pilots on long patrols over water, and experimental changes were made in mid-1918 to improve stability. These included the introduction of 10 in (25 cm) of back-stagger to wings of reduced chord and camber, with narrower elevators and rudder. DH.6s modified to this standard were unofficially dubbed "DH 6As".

1050 DH.6s were still on charge with the RAF on 31 October 1918.

=== Nicknames ===
Many RFC/RAF aircraft of this period received nicknames (some of which, like the "zoo" names of Sopwith types, reached semi-official status), and the DH.6 has a variety of humorous but disrespectful epithets. The reactions of novice pilots were probably behind it being called the "clutching hand". Australian airmen may have been referring to its lack of speed when calling it "skyhook", although the shape of the exhaust pipes has also been mentioned. Other nicknames for the type included "crab," "clockwork mouse," "flying coffin" and "dung hunter" (these last two on account of the shape of the plywood cockpit, thought to resemble either a coffin or an outside toilet).

=== Postwar and civil use ===
There was no place for the DH.6 in the postwar RAF, and survivors were sold off as surplus. In 1919, many went to civilian operators – especially for "joy riding". Some were exported to South Africa and the Point Cook-based aircraft were sold in Australia, where they continued flying into the late 1930s.

One example was exported to New Zealand for use by the Walsh brothers’ New Zealand Flying School and first flew there in February 1920, however it was damaged by a gale in August the same year and was never repaired.

Some 60 aircraft were licence-built in Spain from 1921 onwards with Hispano-Suiza 8 engines, refined fuselages that included separate cockpits, and rounded "de Havilland style" rudder/fin assemblies. At least some of these found their way into the inventory of two Spanish Air Force training establishments.

A DH.6 became the first powered aircraft to be owned by a British Scout Troop, when it was presented to 3rd Hampden (Middlesex) Scouts in 1921.

== Variants ==
DH.6
Two-seat training aircraft.
DH.6A
Modified to improve stability for patrol duties.

== Operators ==
Argentina – The River Plate Aviation Co. Ltd.
Australia – Australian Flying Corps

- No. 5 (Training) Squadron AFC in the United Kingdom.
- No. 7 (Training) Squadron AFC in the United Kingdom.
- Central Flying School AFC at Point Cook, Victoria.

Greece

- Hellenic Naval Air Service

New Zealand

- New Zealand Flying School

Spain

- Spanish Air Force

United Kingdom

- Royal Flying Corps / Royal Air Force
  - No. 67 Squadron RAF
  - No. 99 Squadron RAF
  - No. 105 Squadron RAF
  - No. 110 Squadron RAF
  - No. 144 Squadron RAF
  - No. 187 Squadron RAF
  - No. 190 Squadron RAF
  - No. 236 Squadron RAF
  - No. 244 Squadron RAF
  - No. 250 Squadron RAF
  - No. 251 Squadron RAF
  - No. 252 Squadron RAF
  - No. 253 Squadron RAF
  - No. 254 Squadron RAF
  - No. 255 Squadron RAF
  - No. 256 Squadron RAF
  - No. 258 Squadron RAF
  - No. 260 Squadron RAF
  - No. 272 Squadron RAF
  - No. 274 Squadron RAF
- Royal Naval Air Service

== Specifications (DH.6) ==
Data from De Havilland Aircraft since 1909

General characteristics

- Crew: As trainer: two, pilot and instructor

As patrol aircraft : one
As postwar joy riding aircraft: up to three, pilot plus one or two passengers

- Length: 27 ft 3 1/2 in (8.319 m)
- Wingspan: 35 ft 11 in (10.95 m)
- Height: 10 ft 9 1/2 in (3.289 m)
- Wing area: 436.25 sq ft (40.529 m^{2})
- Empty weight: 1,460 lb (662 kg)
- Gross weight: 2,030 lb (921 kg)
- Fuel capacity: 25 imp gal (30 US gal; 110 L)
- Powerplant: 1 × RAF 1a air-cooled V8 engine, 90 hp (67 kW)
- Propellers: 2-bladed wood fixed pitch propeller

Performance

- Maximum speed: 70 mph (110 km/h, 61 kn)
- Stall speed: 40 mph (64 km/h, 35 kn)
- Endurance: 2 hr 45 min
- Rate of climb: 225 ft/min (1.14 m/s)

Armament

- Bombs: 1 × 100 lb (45 kg) bomb or similar load of smaller bombs could be carried on anti-submarine patrol

== See also ==
Related lists

- List of aircraft of the Royal Air Force
