= Boulton Paul P.6 =

P.6

General information
- Type: Experimental biplane for airfoil investigation
- National origin: United Kingdom
- Manufacturer: Boulton & Paul Ltd
- Designer: J.D North
- Number built: 1

History
- First flight: late 1918

The Boulton & Paul P.6 was a one-off conventional single-engined biplane built by Boulton & Paul Ltd to test the aerodynamics of different airfoil sections. It was later used as the company sales machine.

== Design and development ==
The P.6 was only the second aircraft designed and built by Boulton & Paul, although during the First World War they had built many aircraft under contract, including 1,575 Sopwith Camels. the P.6 was a wood and fabric two-seat single-engined single-bay biplane. Its wings were without stagger or sweep, with a constant chord of 5 ft (1.52 m) on both wings. The intention was to explore the effects of different airfoil sections and the large interplane gap, also 5 ft, would have helped to reduce the complications of interference effects. The initial section used was RAF15. There were ailerons on both upper and lower wings.

The fuselage was flat sided with a rounded top, rather similar in construction to that of the Camel and using many Camel parts. The fin and horn balanced rudder together were almost circular and the tailplane was braced to the fin. The large interplane gap put the upper wing well above the fuselage with the centre section braced to front and rear spars by outward sloping struts from the upper longerons. The pilot's cockpit was under the trailing edge, where there was a cut-out for visibility and the passenger sat in a separate cockpit under the wing. The 90 hp (67 kW) RAF 1a engine drove a four bladed, 9 ft 3 in (2.82 m) diameter propeller and was partly enclosed in a metal cowling, with the cylinder heads protruding as it was air-cooled. There was a simple single axle undercarriage and tail skid.

The date of the first flight is not known, but it was probably towards the end of 1918. The first drawings were dated April 1918 and the aircraft was certainly beyond its initial flight tests in March 1919 when it provided the wife of Dawson Paul, one of the company directors, with her first flight. Though shortly after that the P.6 received the civil registration G-EACJ (K-120), it may well have never displayed this identity. In all known photographs it wears the experimental number X.25, the last one of this series inaugurated in 1917. In addition it was painted with RAF roundels and tail stripes.

== Operational history ==
It is not known if wings of other sections were fitted as originally intended, but useful aerodynamic data was gathered. It flew rather well and by May 1919 Boulton & Paul were using it as their sales machine, with the company name in large print on the fuselage side in addition to the roundels. This corporate aircraft made perhaps the first business flight, from Boulton & Paul's airfield on Mousehold Heath at Norwich to Bury St Edmunds about 36 miles (58 km) away.

== Replica ==
A replica of this aircraft has been built by the Boulton Paul Association and is now on display at the Norfolk and Suffolk Aircraft Museum, at Flixton, Suffolk.

== Specifications ==
Data from

General characteristics

- Crew: 1
- Capacity: 1 passenger
- Length: 19 ft 0 in (5.79 m)
- Wingspan: 25 ft 0 in (7.62 m)
- Height: 8 ft 0 in (2.44 m)
- Wing area: 235 sq ft (21.8 m^{2})
- Airfoil: RAF 15
- Empty weight: 1,100 lb (499 kg)
- Gross weight: 1,725 lb (782 kg)
- Fuel capacity: 20.1 imp gal (24.1 US gal; 91 L)
- Powerplant: 1 × RAF1a air-cooled V-8 engine, 90 hp (67 kW)

Performance

- Maximum speed: 103 mph (166 km/h, 90 kn) at 1,000 ft (300 m)
- Endurance: 2 hr 20 min
- Time to altitude: 9 min to 5,000 ft (1,500 m)
