= RAF 1 =

V-8 piston aircraft engine

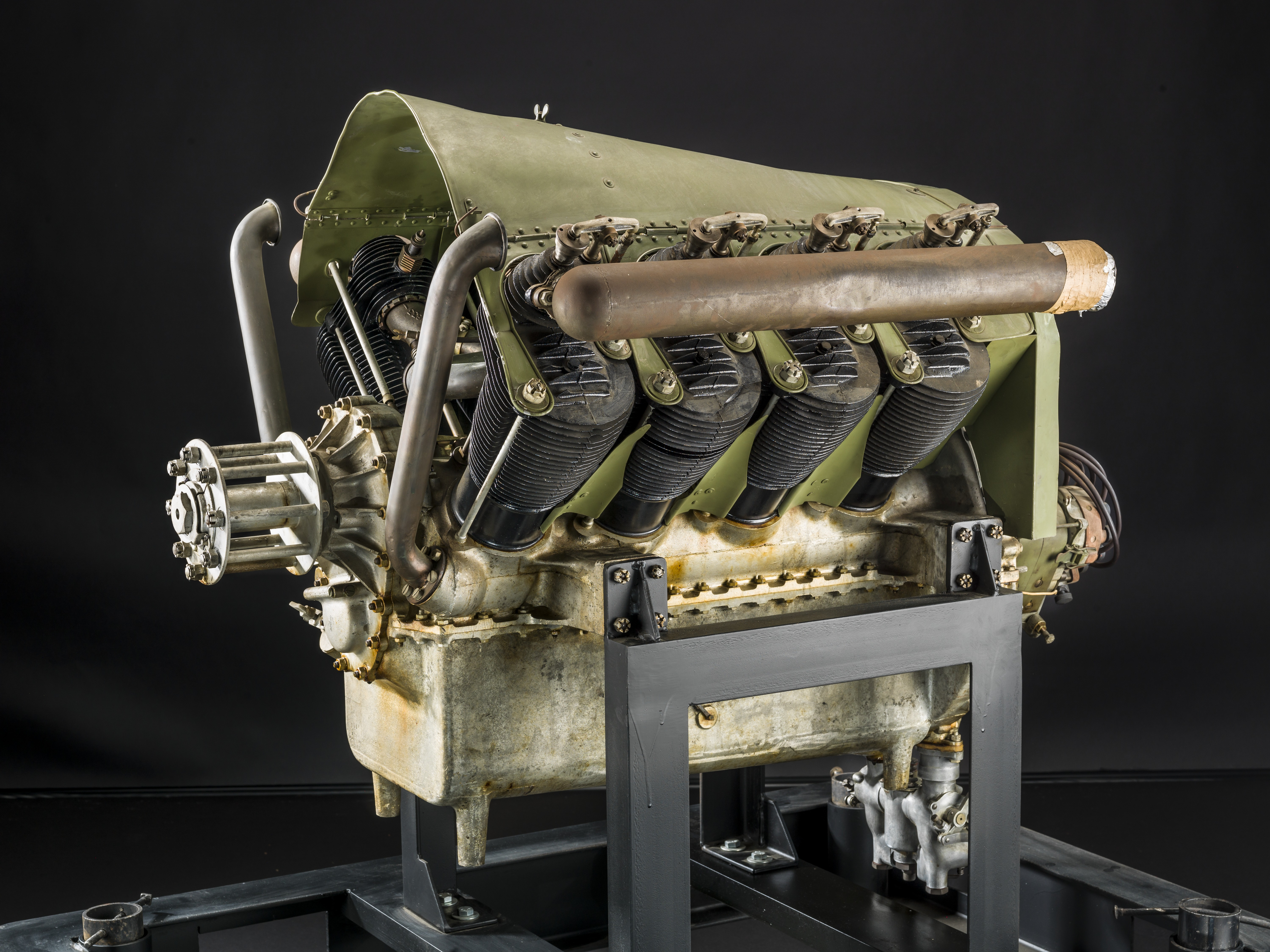
- RAF 1a at the National Air and Space Museum
- Type: Piston V8 aero engine
- Manufacturer: Royal Aircraft Factory
- First run: 1913
- Major applications: Royal Aircraft Factory B.E.2; Airco DH.6
- Developed from: Renault 70/80 hp

The RAF 1 is a British air-cooled, V-8 engine developed for aircraft use during World War I. Based on a French design, it was developed at the Royal Aircraft Factory, and built by six different British companies including Daimler, Rolls-Royce and Wolseley Motors Limited.

== Design and development ==
The RAF 1 was based on the Renault 70/80 hp engine, being intended specifically to replace that engine in the B.E.2c. It featured larger cylinders (3.94 in × 5.5 in (100 mm × 140 mm)) for a total displacement of 540 cubic inches (8.8 L). It was rated at 92 hp (70 kW) at 1,600 rpm. The heads were cast integrally with the cylinders, with the intake and exhaust valves set one above the other in an upside-down F-head configuration.

The engines featured a large diameter lightweight flywheel at the rear, enclosed in a cast housing. Engine oil was picked up from the bottom of the crankcase and slung into a reservoir at the top. From there it was gravity fed, via a gallery high on the right side of the engine block, to the main bearing caps, and then to the connecting rod journals by the centrifugal effect of the turning crankshaft. The main bearings were ball bearings and were splash fed. Engine oil from the gallery was also supplied to the 1 : 2 reduction gearbox at the front. This drove the four-bladed propeller at one half engine speed, and the single camshaft was splined into the rear of the short propeller shaft. This arrangement meant that no mechanical oil pump was needed. Excess engine oil from the flywheel overflowed the reservoir and trickled over the large surface area of the round flywheel cover.

Two passages cast into the cover took air-fuel mixture from the carburettor mounted at the bottom to a copper U-shaped inlet manifold mounted between the banks of cylinders, and the flywheel cover acted as a heat exchanger, preheating the fuel-air mixture. In late 1915, the bore was increased to 4.1 inches (100 mm), leading to an increased displacement of 590 cubic inches (9.7 L) and power of 86 kW (115 hp) at 1,800 rpm.

=== Supercharger ===
In late 1915 a supercharged experimental version of the RAF 1a was developed. The engine was test flown in a B.E.2c. Climb rate improved from taking 36 minutes to reach 8,500 ft (2,600 m), without the supercharger, to reaching 11,500 ft (3,500 m) in the same time with the supercharger.

== Variants ==
RAF 1
RAF 1a
Standard engine for aircraft using this powerplant.
RAF 1b
Uprated version slated for installation in the B.E.2e - reliability problems precluded production.
RAF 1c
RAF 1e

== Applications ==
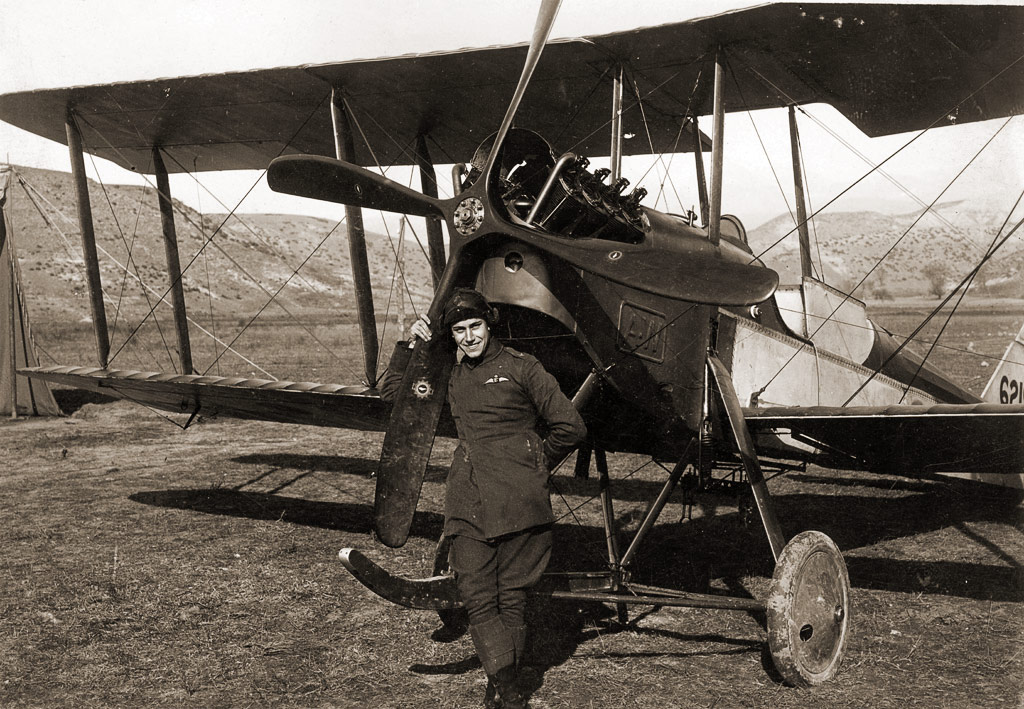
Armstrong Whitworth F.K.3

List from Lumsden

- Airco DH.6
- Armstrong Whitworth F.K.2
- Armstrong Whitworth F.K.3
- Avro 504
- Boulton Paul P.6
- Boulton Paul P.9
- de Havilland DH.51 (prototype)
- Royal Aircraft Factory B.E.2
- Royal Aircraft Factory B.E.9
- Royal Aircraft Factory S.E.5 (postwar civilian conversions)

== Specifications (RAF 1a) ==
Data from Lumsden

=== General characteristics ===
- Type: 8-cylinder, upright, 90 degree Vee engine
- Bore: 3.94 in (100 mm)
- Stroke: 5.51 in (140 mm)
- Displacement: 537.4 cu in (8.8 L)
- Dry weight: 450 lb

=== Components ===
- Fuel system: Twin Claudel-Hobson carburettors
- Oil system: Wet sump
- Cooling system: Air-cooled
- Reduction gear: 0.5:1, Left-hand tractor

=== Performance ===
- Power output: 108 hp at 1,800 rpm (takeoff power)
- Compression ratio: 4.3:1

== See also ==
Related development

- Renault 80 hp

Comparable engines

- Wolseley 60 hp

Related lists

- List of aircraft engines
