= Royal Aircraft Factory B.E.9 =

British experimental reconnaissance aircraft

B.E.9
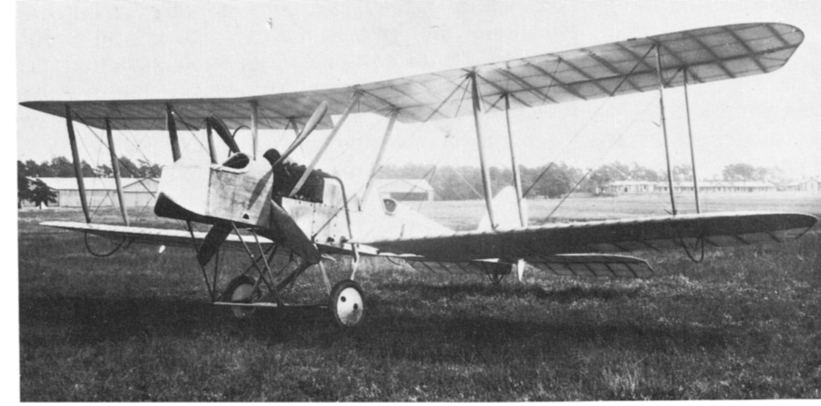

General information
- Type: Experimental fighter/reconnaissance aircraft
- Manufacturer: Royal Aircraft Factory
- Primary user: Royal Flying Corps
- Number built: 1

History
- First flight: 14 August 1915

The Royal Aircraft Factory B.E.9 was a British experimental reconnaissance aircraft of World War I.

== Design ==
The intention of the designers was to combine the high performance of tractor configuration aircraft with a good field of fire for the observer's machine gun, as provided by pushers. It was therefore decided to modify an example of the B.E.2c by adding a small wooden box (which soon gained the nickname "pulpit") in front of the aircraft's propeller, which would accommodate a gunner armed with a Lewis gun on a trainable mount. The normal observer's cockpit of the B.E.2c was removed, allowing the engine (the standard air-cooled RAF 1a of the B.E.2) to be moved rearwards, while the wingspan was increased, and a larger fin was fitted.

A general layout of this kind had various drawbacks - the most obvious being the perilous situation of the gunner - who was liable to injury by the propeller, or to be crushed by the engine in the mildest of crashes. The type was not developed further by the Royal Aircraft Factory (although the French SPAD S.A, of similar concept, saw service) and was soon rendered superfluous by the availability of synchronization gears.

== Service testing ==
The single prototype built (serial 1700) first flew at Farnborough on 14 August 1915. Early testing indicated that performance was little different from the B.E.2c upon which it was based, although the "difficulty" (surely an understatement) in communicating between the pilot and observer, separated by both engine and propeller, was reported. and in September that year the B.E.9 was sent for testing in the field in France by a number of units, including No. 6 Squadron, 8 Squadron and 16 Squadron. While the B.E.9 carried out a few operational patrols in France, including one encounter with a German Fokker Eindekker, the opinion of those testing it was generally negative, with Major Hugh Dowding, at the time commander of 16 Squadron, stating that the B.E.9 was "...an extremely dangerous machine from the passenger's point of view", while Hugh Trenchard, head of the RFC in France said that "this type of machine cannot be recommended". It was sent back to the United Kingdom early in 1916. In his memoirs, Lt Duncan Grinnell-Milne recalls his gratitude that initial combat experience with the type proved inconclusive and that it was not ordered into mass production.

Design work had started on the B.E.9a, a more powerful version powered by a 140hp V12 RAF4a engine, but a prototype was never built.

== Operators ==
United Kingdom

- Royal Flying Corps

(prototype tested briefly by:)
- No. 6 Squadron RFC
- No. 8 Squadron RFC
- No. 16 Squadron RFC

== Specifications (BE.9) ==

Data from

General characteristics

- Crew: 2 (pilot and observer)
- Length: 29 ft 0 in (8.84 m)
- Wingspan: 40 ft 10 1/2 in (12.459 m)
- Height: 11 ft 5 in (3.48 m)
- Powerplant: 1 × RAF 1a air-cooled V-8 engine, 90 hp (67 kW)

Performance

- Maximum speed: 82 mph (132 km/h, 71 kn) at sea level
- Time to altitude: 4.5 min to 1,000 ft (300 m)

Armament

- Guns: 1× Lewis gun

== See also ==
Aircraft of comparable role, configuration, and era

- SPAD S.A
