= Royal Aircraft Factory B.E.2 =

1912 military aircraft family by the Royal Aircraft Factory

B.E.2
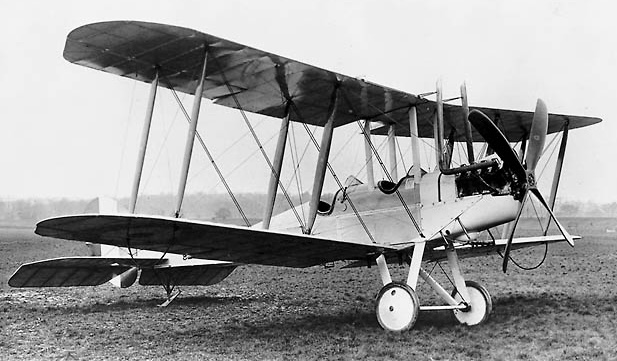
- B.E.2c

General information
- Type: Reconnaissance, light bomber, night fighter, trainer, coastal patrol aircraft
- Manufacturer: Royal Aircraft Factory; Vickers; Bristol Aeroplane Company; Ruston
- Designer: Geoffrey de Havilland, E.T. Busk
- Primary users: Royal Flying Corps/Royal Air Force Aviation Militaire Belge
- Number built: ~ 3,500

History
- Introduction date: 1912 (RFC)
- First flight: 1 February 1912
- Retired: 1919 (RAF)
- Variants: Royal Aircraft Factory B.E.9; Royal Aircraft Factory B.E.12

The Royal Aircraft Factory B.E.2 is a British single-engine tractor two-seat biplane, designed and developed at the Royal Aircraft Factory. Most of the roughly 3,500 built were constructed under contract by private companies, including established aircraft manufacturers and firms new to aircraft construction.

Early versions entered squadron service with the Royal Flying Corps in 1912 and the type served throughout the First World War. Initially used as a reconnaissance aircraft and light bomber, as a single-seat night fighter the type destroyed six German airships between September and December 1916.

By late 1915, the B.E.2 was proving to be vulnerable to the recently introduced German Fokker Eindecker fighters, leading to increased losses during the period known as the Fokker Scourge. Although by now obsolete, it had to remain in front line service while replacement types were brought into service. Following its belated withdrawal from combat, the B.E. continued to serve in training, communications, and coastal anti-submarine patrol roles.

The B.E.2 became the subject of controversy. From the B.E.2c variant onward, it had been developed to be inherently stable, which was helpful for artillery observation and aerial photography duties. However this stability was achieved at the expense of manoeuvrability; moreover the observer, in the front seat ahead of the pilot, had a limited field of fire for his gun.

== Development ==
=== Background ===
The B.E.2 was one of the first fixed-wing aircraft to be designed at what was then called the Royal Balloon Factory (the organisation was formally renamed as the Royal Aircraft Factory on 26 April 1911). The team responsible for its design came under the direction of British engineer Mervyn O'Gorman, the factory's superintendent. The B.E.2 designation was formulated in accordance with the system devised by O'Gorman, which classified aircraft by their layout: B.E. stood for "Blériot Experimental", and was used for aircraft of tractor configuration (although in practice, all B.E. types were biplanes rather than the monoplanes typical of the Blériot company).

At first, the activities of the Factory were limited to aeronautical research and the design and construction of actual aircraft was not officially sanctioned. O'Gorman got around this restriction by using the factory's responsibility for the repair and maintenance of aircraft belonging to the Royal Flying Corps, so that existing aircraft needing major repairs were nominally "reconstructed" but often appeared as new designs, retaining few original components aside from the engine.

The first pair of B.E. aircraft were flown within two months of each other and had the same basic design, the work of Geoffrey de Havilland, who was at the time both the chief designer and the test pilot at the Balloon Factory. Its first public appearance was in early January 1912. With the contemporary Avro 500, the B.E.2 helped to establish the tractor biplane as the dominant aircraft layout for a considerable time.

=== B.E.1 ===
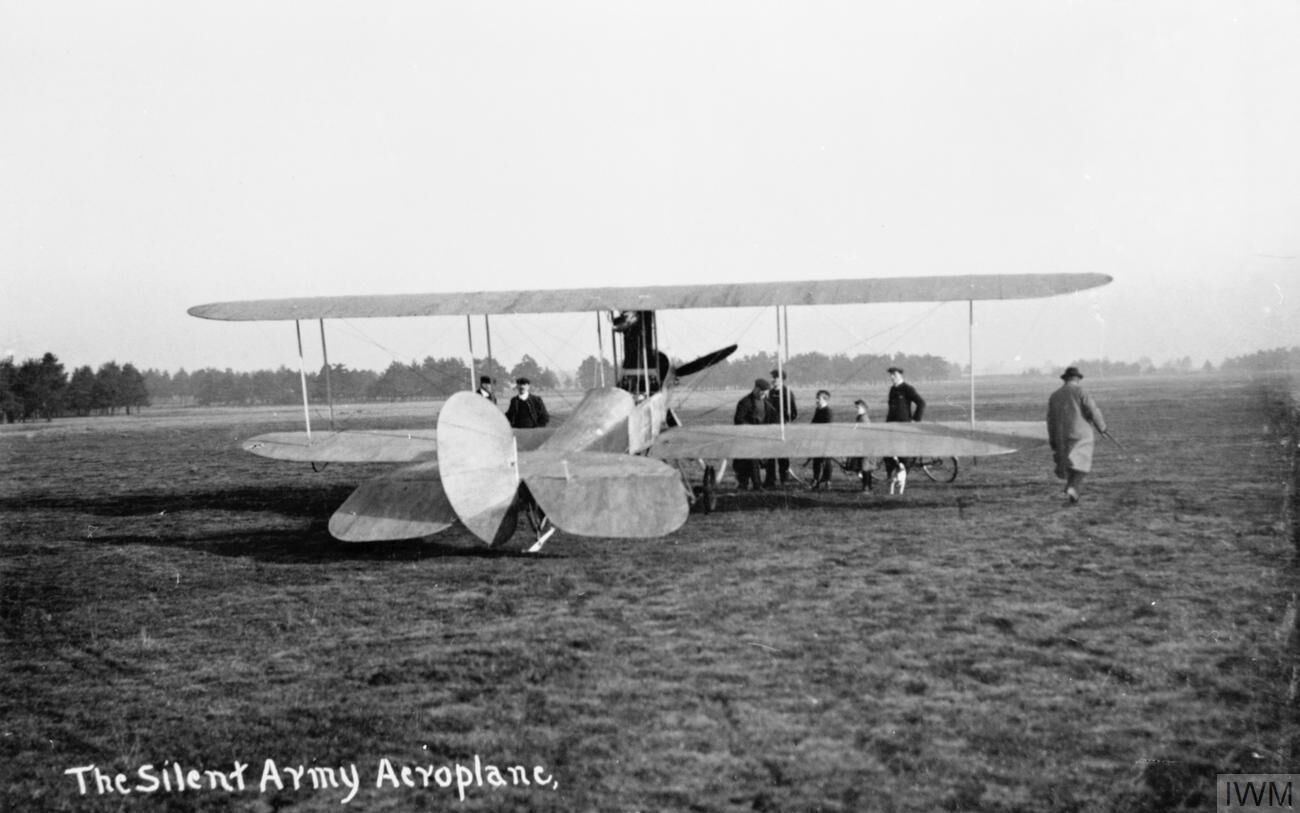
B.E.1., originally captioned 'The Silent Army Aeroplane'. Note radiator between cabane struts.

This was ostensibly a rebuild of a Voisin pusher biplane, powered by a 60 hp (45 kW) water-cooled Wolseley engine; however, the B.E.1 used only the powerplant of the Voisin.

It was a two-bay tractor biplane with parallel-chord unstaggered wings with rounded ends and used wing warping for roll control. The wings were of unequal span with the upper wing's span being 36 ft 7 1/2 in (11.163 m) and the lower 34 ft 11 1/2 in (10.655 m). The fuselage was a rectangular section fabric-covered wire-braced structure, with the pilot seated aft behind the wings, and the observer in front under the centre section. This arrangement allowed the aircraft to be flown "solo" without affecting the aircraft's centre of gravity. Behind the pilot's position, a curved top decking extended aft to the tail, although the forward decking and cowling of later variants was not fitted at this stage. The tail surfaces consisted of a half-oval horizontal stabiliser with a split elevator mounted on top of the upper longerons and an ovoid rudder hinged to the sternpost. There was no fixed vertical fin. The main undercarriage consisted of a pair of skids each carried on an inverted V-strut at their rear and a single raked strut at the front while an axle carrying the wheels was bound to the skids by bungee cords and restrained by radius rods. A similarly sprung tailskid was fitted, while the wings were protected by semicircular bows located beneath the lower wing tips. The radiator being mounted between the front pair of cabane struts

It was first flown by de Havilland on 4 December 1911. but was not flown again until 27 December, following the substitution of a Claudel carburettor for the original Wolseley, which had allowed no throttle control. Other minor modifications were made over the following weeks: the undercarriage wheels were moved back 12 in (300 mm), the wings (which originally had no dihedral), were re-rigged to have 1° dihedral, and the propeller was cut down in an attempt to increase the engine speed. Later, the Wolseley engine was replaced by a 60 hp (45 kW) air-cooled Renault which eliminated the need for a radiator.

The B.E.1 had a long career as a research aircraft: trialling many of the modifications made to later B.E.2 variants. By the time it was finally struck off charge in 1916 it resembled a contemporary B.E.2b. Among other equipment tested for the first time in this airframe was early radio apparatus.

=== B.E.2 ===
The B.E.2 was almost identical to the B.E.1, differing principally in being powered by a 60 hp (45 kW) air-cooled V-8 Renault and in having equal-span wings. Its number was not allocated as a separate type, but numbers allocated to early Royal Aircraft Factory aircraft were the constructor's numbers rather than type designations. Sometimes described as a "rebuild" of either a Bristol Boxkite or a Breguet, it seems to have been the first aeroplane built at the factory without the subterfuge of being a "reconstruction". It first flew on 1 February 1912, again with de Havilland as the test pilot. The Renault proved a much more satisfactory powerplant than the Wolseley fitted to the B.E.1, and performance was further improved when a 70 hp (52 kW) model was fitted that May.

The B.E.2 flew extensively at the Military Aeroplane Competition on Salisbury Plain during August 1912. It was barred from competing officially as O'Gorman was one of the judges, but its performance was clearly superior to the other entrants and on 12 August 1912 it achieved a British altitude record of 10,560 ft (3,220 m) while being flown by de Havilland with Major Sykes as a passenger.

Other prototypes of the production B.E.2 series were produced, including the B.E.5 and the B.E.6. These mainly differed in the powerplant, initially an ENV liquid cooled engine, and both were eventually fitted with 70 hp (52 kW) Renaults, becoming effectively standard B.E.2.s

=== B.E.2a ===
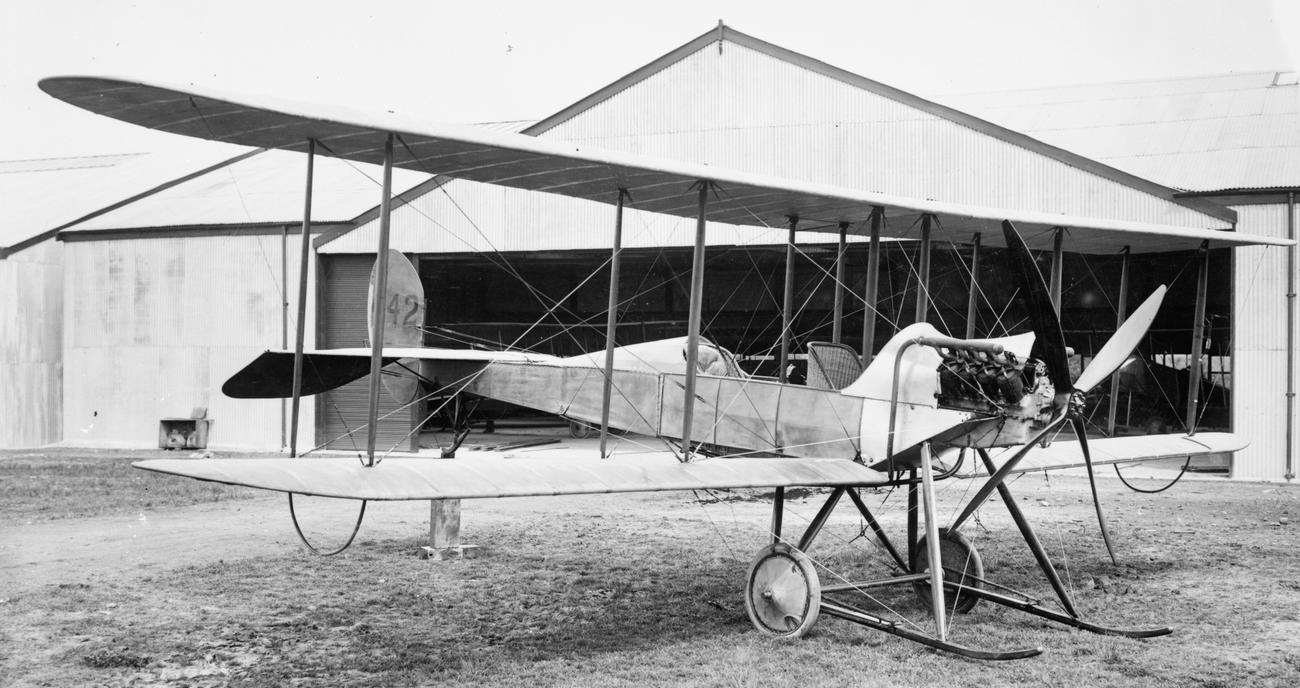
Early production B.E.2a lacking decking between cockpits and with unequal span wings

The designation B.E.2a was assigned to the first production aircraft having first appeared on a drawing showing an aircraft with unequal span wings with slight dihedral dated 20 February 1912. These differed from the B.E.1 and B.E.2 in possessing a revised fuel system, in which the streamlined gravity tank below the centre section of the wing was moved to behind the engine although the main fuel tank remained under the observer's seat.

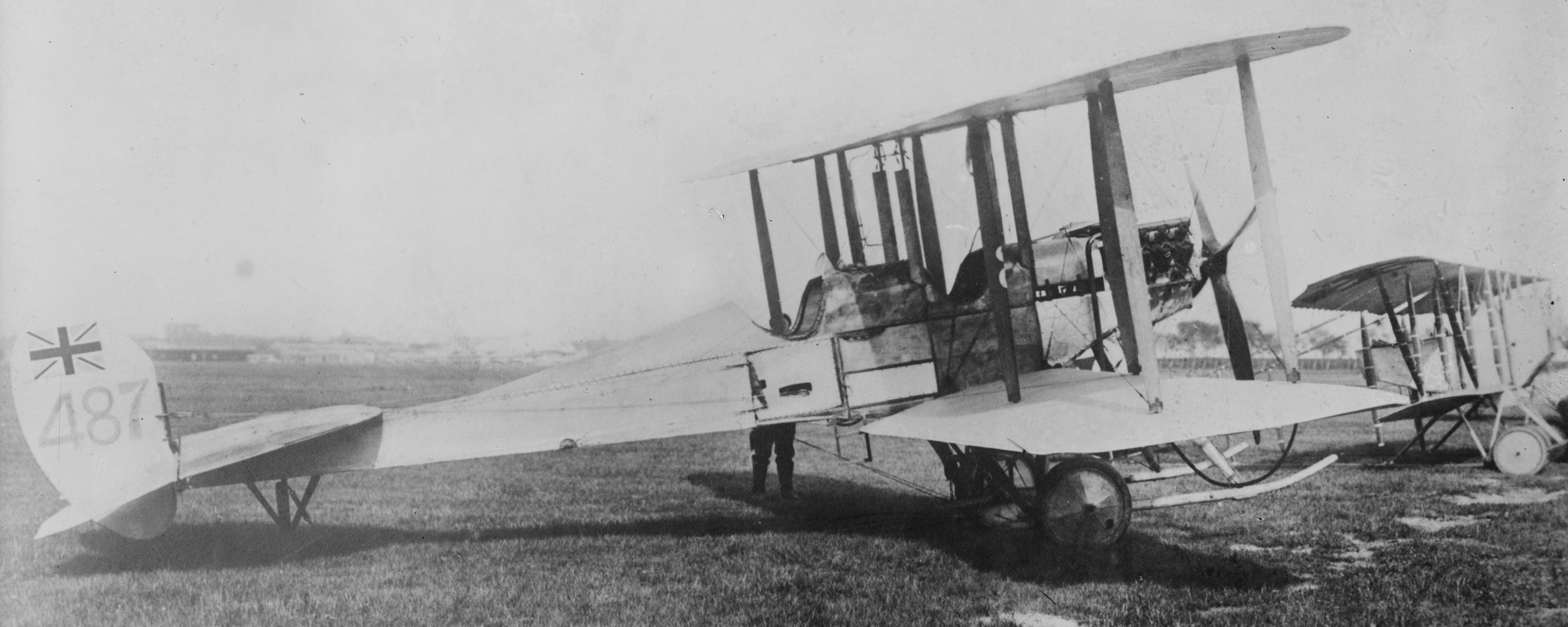
B.E.2a in France in 1915 with Union Jack national insignia used before roundels became standard

Early production aircraft had unequal span wings, similar to those fitted on the B.E.1, and at first there was no decking between the pilot and observer's seats, although this was added later. Sandbag loading tests revealed that the safety margin of the rear spar was somewhat less than that of the front; to remedy this, a revised wing was designed with a deeper rear spar, and consequently a different aerofoil section. Later production aircraft also had equal-span wings. These modifications were retrofitted to the majority of the remaining earlier production aircraft.

The first production order was placed with British manufacturing conglomerate Vickers; shortly afterwards a second order was issued to the Bristol Aeroplane Company. The first contractor-built B.E.2as appeared during the first weeks of 1913; during February of that year, at least two such aeroplanes were delivered to No.2 Squadron of the Royal Flying Corps. These were possibly the first examples of the type to enter service.

=== B.E.2b ===
The B.E.2b which followed the original production standard benefitted from various improvements. It had a revised cockpit coamings, which gave better protection from the elements, and revised controls to both the elevator and rudder. Some aircraft ordered as B.E.2bs were completed as B.E.2cs, and others were built with some of the B.E.2c modifications, such as sump cowlings and "V" undercarriages.

At the outbreak of war, these early B.E.2s formed part of the equipment of the first three squadrons of the RFC to be sent to France. A B.E.2a of No.2 Squadron was the first aircraft of the Royal Flying Corps to arrive in France after the start of the First World War, on 26 August 1914.

=== B.E.2c ===
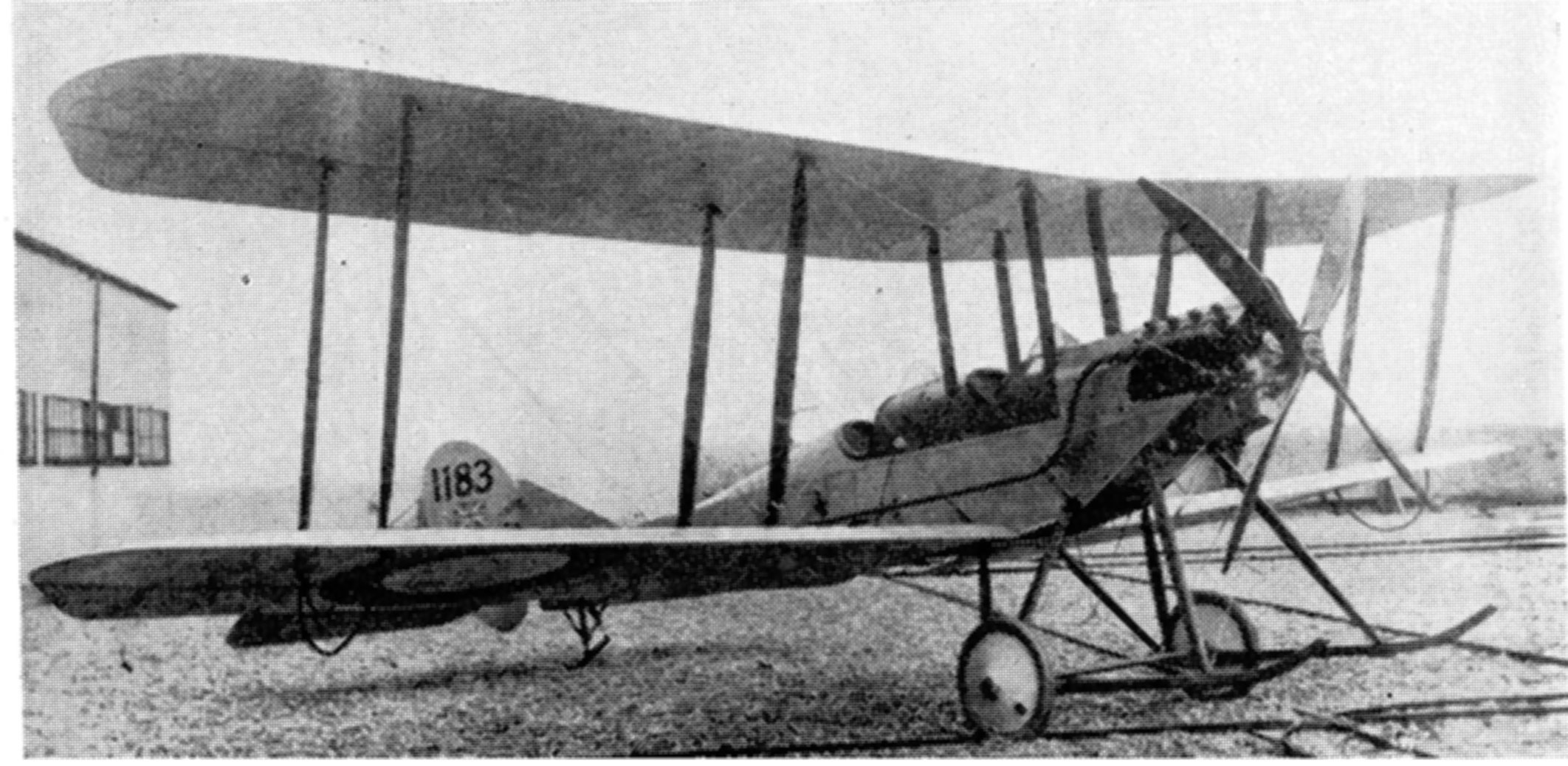
Early Renault-powered B.E.2c, with skid undercarriage, and lacking sump cowling and upper wing cut-out

The B.E.2c was a major redesign, and was the result of research by E.T. Busk which aimed to provide an inherently stable aeroplane. This allowed the crew's full attention to be devoted to reconnaissance duties and was also desirable for safety reasons. The first example, a converted B.E.2b, flew on 30 May 1914 and the type went into squadron service just before the outbreak of war. Relatively large orders were placed for the new version, with deliveries of production aircraft starting in December 1914. During 1915, this model replaced the early B.E.2s in the squadrons in France. The B.E.2c used the same fuselage as the B.E.2b, but was otherwise really a new type, being fitted with new staggered wings of different planform, while ailerons replaced the wing warping used on earlier models. The tailplane was also new, and a triangular fin was fitted to the rudder.

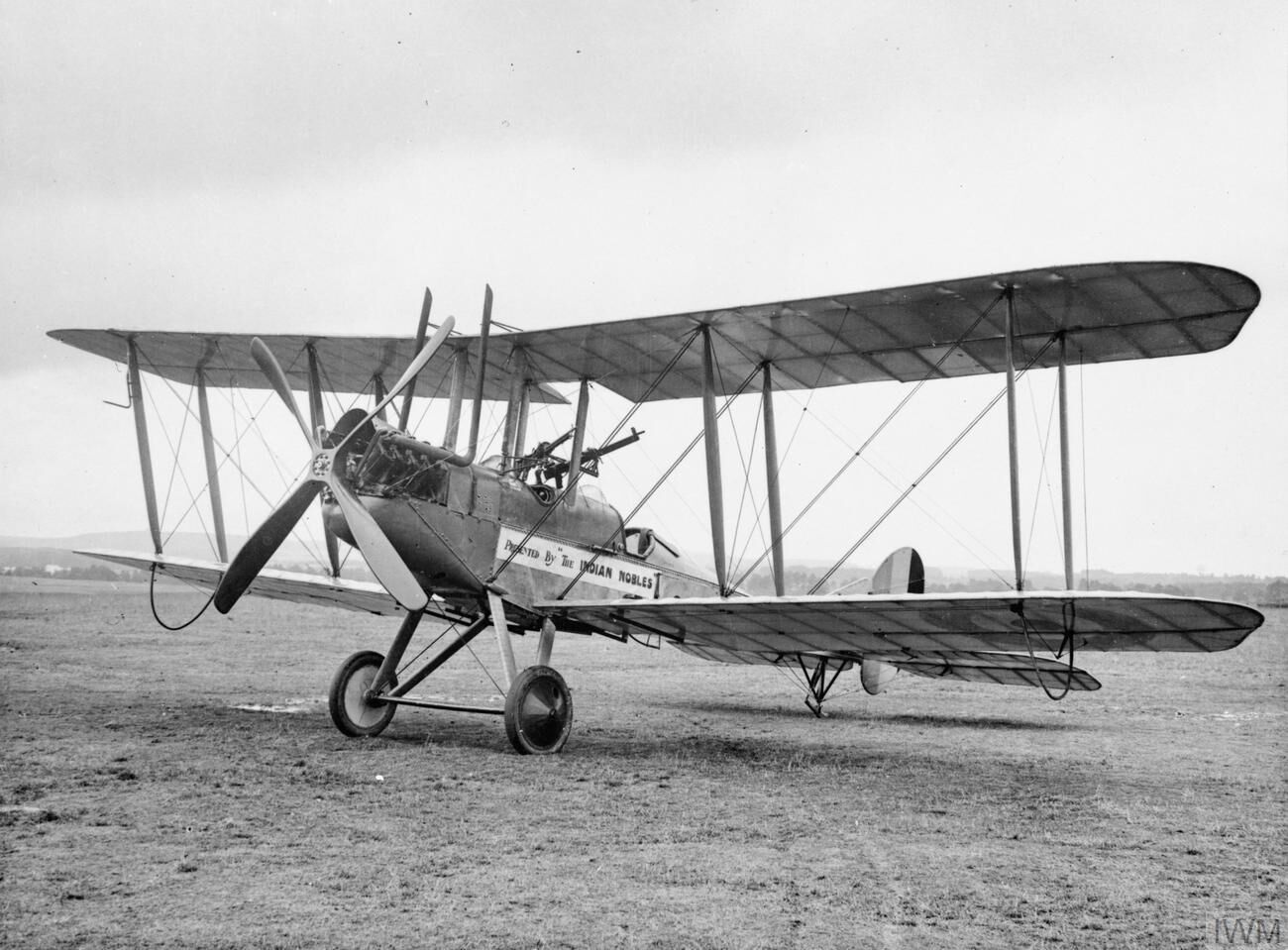
Operational B.E.2c with RAF 1a engine, "V" undercarriage, streamlined sump cowl, and upper wing cut-out

After the first few aircraft, production machines were powered by a development of the Renault engine, the RAF 1a, and the twin skid undercarriage was replaced by a plain "V" undercarriage. A streamlined cowling covering the sump was fitted to improve streamlining. Exhausts were also modified with two vertical exhaust pipes (one for each cylinder bank) discharging above the upper wing.

=== B.E.2d ===
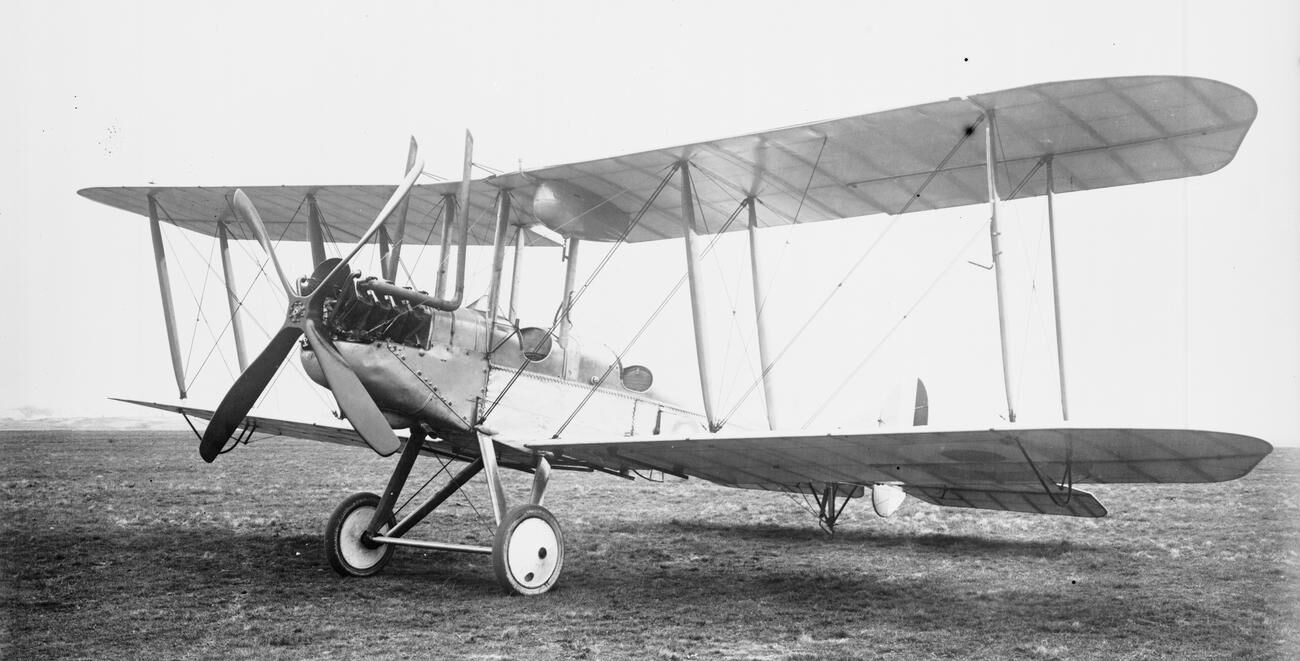
B.E.2d

Hispano powered Belgian B.E.2d with synchronised Vickers gun and gun ring

The B.E.2d was a dual control version of the "c" variant and was provided with full controls in the front cockpit as well as in the rear. This meant that there was no room for the fuel tank under the observer's seat; instead a centre section gravity tank was fitted. To ensure adequate endurance this tank was large, adding drag that reduced performance, particularly in the climb. Most B.E.2ds were used as trainers, where their dual controls and five-hour endurance were of benefit.

B.E.2ds supplied to Belgium were not only re-engined with Hispano engines, but at least some of them had the pilot and observer's seating positions reversed, giving the latter a much better field of fire. Some Belgian B.E.2cs were similarly modified, and at least one was fitted with a Scarff ring on the rear cockpit.

=== B.E.2e ===
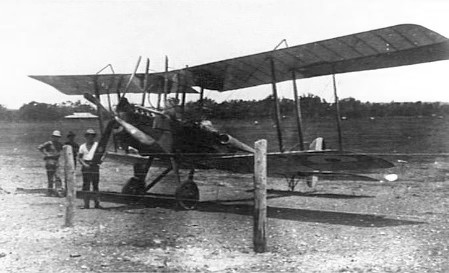
B.E.2e with single bay wings and large overhang

During 1916, the B.E.2cs began to be superseded by the B.E.2e. This variant had new sesquiplane wings, similar to those used on the Royal Aircraft Factory R.E.8, which were braced by a single pair of interplane struts per side as a "single-bay" biplane, and with the lower wing panels having a much reduced span. Ailerons were fitted to upper and lower wings and were joined by connecting rods. The horizontal tail was also new, replacing the semicircular unit of the B.E.2c and d with an angular unit with straight leading and trailing edges and angled tips, while the large curved fin and the rudder of the late B.E.2c was retained.

It was intended to fit the new, uprated RAF 1b but this engine did not achieve production status, and the B.E.2e used the same engine as its predecessor, considerably reducing the expected improvement in performance.

B.E.2c and B.E.2d aircraft still under construction when the new model entered production were completed with B.E.2e wings. To rationalise the supply of spare parts these aircraft were officially designated as the "B.E.2f" and "B.E.2g".

About 3,500 B.E.2s were built by over 20 different manufacturers. An exact breakdown between the different models has never been produced, if only because so many B.E.2s were completed as later models than originally ordered.

The B.E.9 and the B.E.12 were variants developed to provide the B.E.2 with an effective forward-firing armament. The B.E.12 (a single-seater) went into production and saw squadron service, mainly as a Zeppelin interceptor, however neither variant was ultimately a great success as both designs had been superseded by the time they were completed.

== Operational history ==
=== Prewar service ===
During the pre-war period, those B.E.2s that had reached service were primarily flown by No 2, No 4 and No 6 Squadrons, who rapidly accumulated an unusually high number of flight hours on the type. Aviation author J.M. Bruce has commented that during this time, compared with their contemporaries, the early B.E.2s demonstrated a high standard of serviceability and reliability: as borne out by the squadrons' maintenance records.

During this time, multiple long-distance flights were conducted using individual B.E.2s, especially by personnel of No. 2. Squadron. On 22 May 1913, Captain Longcroft flew his aircraft from Farnborough Airport to Montrose Aerodrome, covering the 550 mile distance in ten hours, 55 minutes, with two intermediary stops. On 19 August 1913, Longcroft repeated this trip using a B.E.2 outfitted with an additional fuel tank, lowering the journey time to seven hours, 40 minutes with only one stop midway. A good deal of experimental flying was undertaken during this period, influencing later fuel system and undercarriage design as well as structural strengthening and aerodynamic changes.

=== Western Front ===
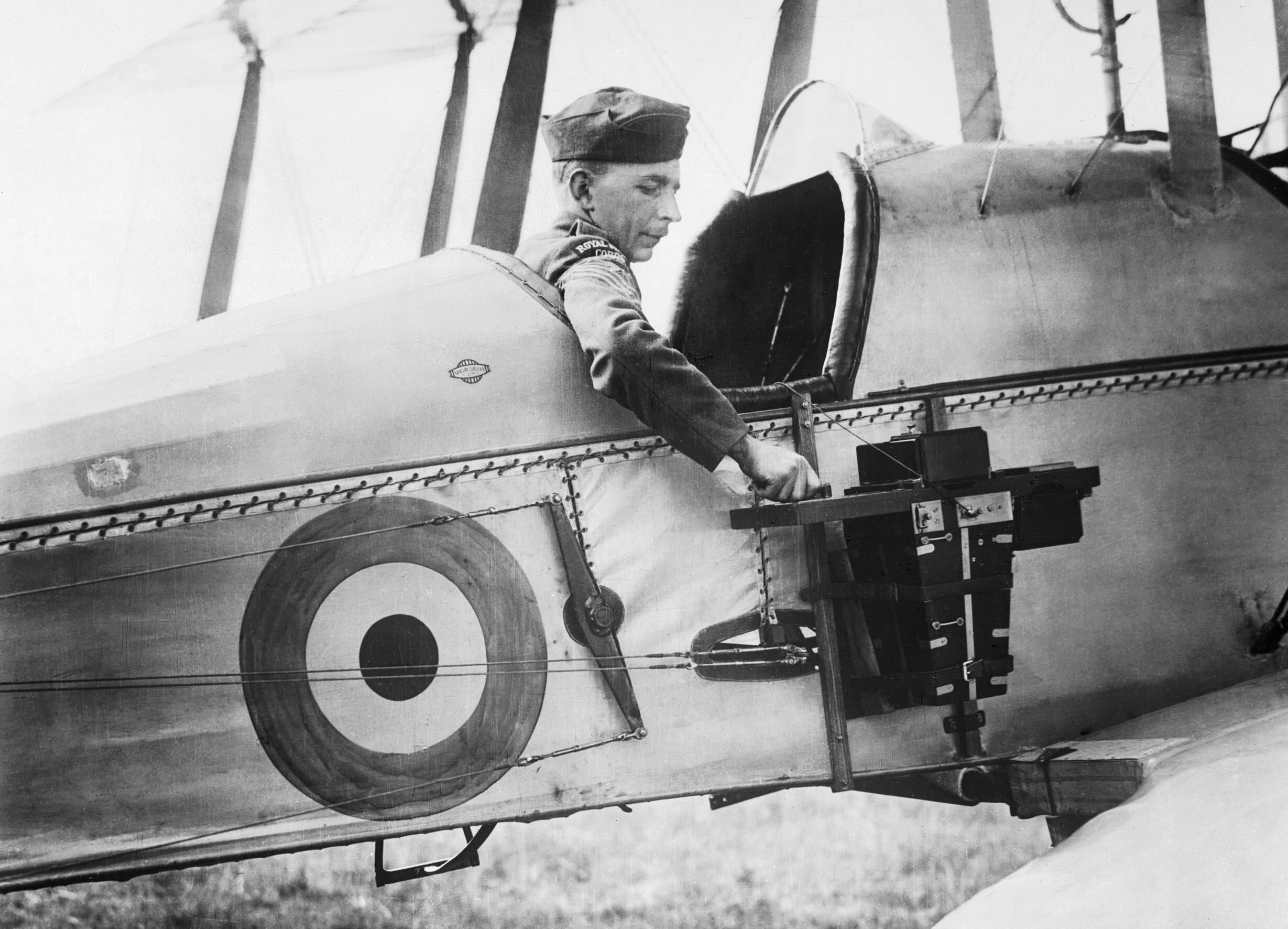
An aerial reconnaissance camera of 1916 as operated by the pilot of a B.E.2c

The early models of the B.E. 2 had already served in the RFC for two years prior to the outbreak of the Great War, and were among the aircraft that arrived with the British Expeditionary Force in France during 1914. Like all service aircraft of this period, they had been designed at a time when the qualities required by a warplane were largely a matter for conjecture and speculation, in the absence of any actual experience of the use of aircraft in warfare: at this stage all the combatants were still feeling their way and aerial combat, especially the need for reconnaissance aircraft to be able to defend themselves, was not widely anticipated. As a result, the B.E.2 was originally designed without any provision for armament.

In the absence of any official policy regarding armament, more aggressive crews improvised their own. While some flew entirely unarmed, or perhaps carried service revolvers or automatic pistols, others armed themselves with hand-wielded rifles or carbines as used by ground troops, or even fitted a Lewis gun. The performance of the early Renault powered models of the B.E. was degraded by any additional weight, and in any case the carriage of this weaponry proved of questionable effectiveness.

It was still necessary for the observer to be located over the centre of gravity, in front of the pilot, to ensure fore and aft balance when the aircraft was flown "solo". In this awkward position, his view was poor, and the degree to which he could handle a camera (or, later, a gun) was hampered by the struts and wires supporting the centre section of the top wing. In practice, the pilot of a B.E.2 almost always operated the camera, and the observer, when he was armed at all, had a rather poor field of fire to the rear, having, at best, to shoot back over his pilot's head. Whenever bombs were to be carried, or maximum endurance was required, the observer would normally have to be left behind.

Nonetheless, the B.E.2s were already in use as light bombers as well as for visual reconnaissance; an attack on Courtrai Railway station on 26 April 1915 earning a posthumous Victoria Cross for 2nd Lt. William Rhodes-Moorhouse, the first such award to be made for an aerial operation. By this time, prewar aircraft were already disappearing from RFC service.

The type that replaced the B.E.2a and B.E.2b (as well as the assortment of other types in use at the time) in the reconnaissance squadrons of the RFC in 1915 was the B.E.2c, which had also been designed before the war. The most important difference in the new model was an improvement in stability – a genuinely useful characteristic, especially in aerial photographic work, using the primitive plate cameras of the time, with their relatively long exposures. Unfortunately, in this case the stability was coupled with "heavy" controls and relatively poor manoeuvrability. A suitable engine was not available in sufficient quantities to replace the air-cooled Renault – the RAF 1a being essentially an uprated version of the French engine – so that the improvement in the B.E.2c's performance was less than startling.

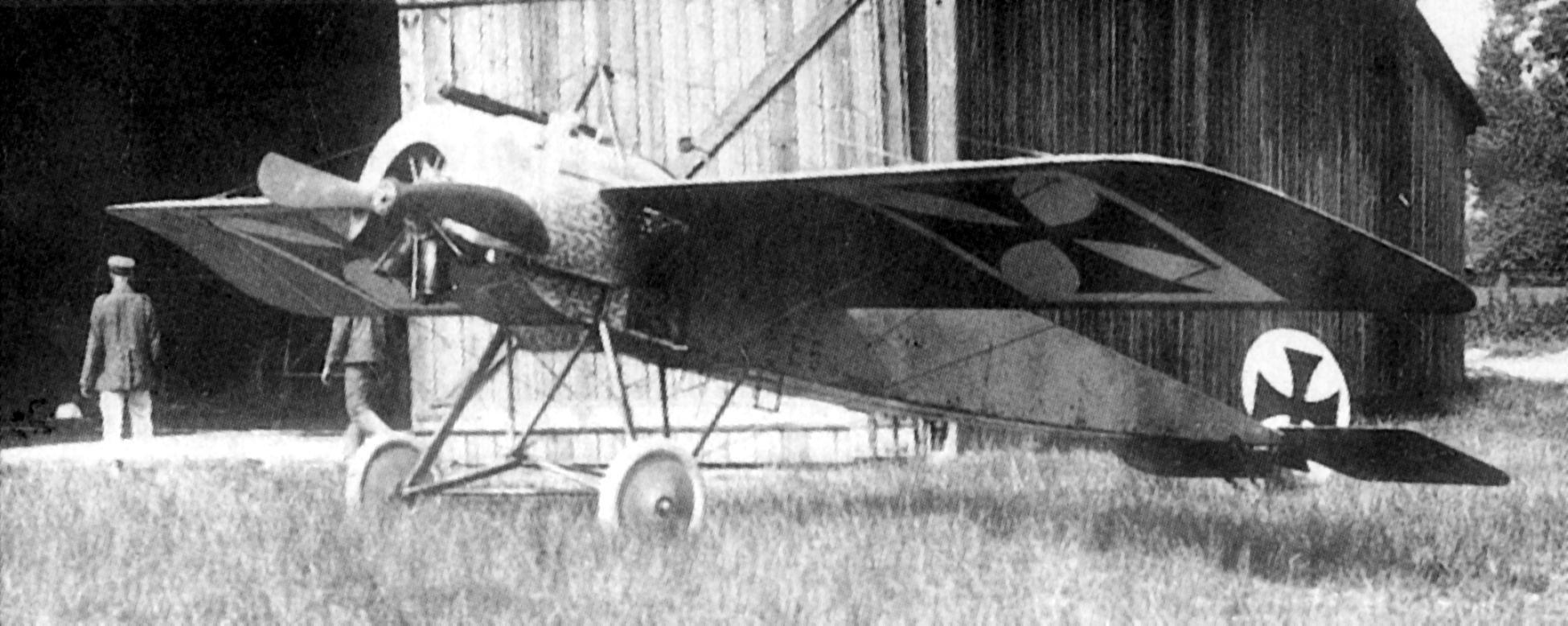
The Fokker Eindecker was the nemesis of the B.E.2 in 1915/early 1916

The vulnerability of the B.E.2c to fighter attack became plain in late 1915, with the advent of the Fokker Eindecker. This led the British press to disparagingly refer to the aircraft as being "Fokker Fodder", while German pilots also gave it the nickname of kaltes Fleisch ("cold meat"). British ace Albert Ball described the B.E.2c as "a bloody awful aeroplane". Unable to cope with such a primitive fighter as the Fokker E.I, it was virtually helpless against the newer German fighters of 1916–17. The aircraft's poor performance against the Fokker and the failure to improve the aircraft or replace it caused great controversy in England, with Noel Pemberton Billing attacking the B.E.2c and the Royal Aircraft Factory in the House of Commons on 21 March 1916, claiming that RFC pilots in France were being "rather murdered than killed".

This agitation prompted the setting up of two enquiries; one into the management of the Royal Aircraft Factory, and another into the high command of the Royal Flying Corps, the latter of which being headed by a judge. These reports largely cleared both Factory management and the RFC commanders responsible for ordering the B.E.2, but Mervyn O'Gorman was effectively dismissed as supervisor of the Factory by a "sideways promotion", while many of the most talented individuals amongst the factory's designers and engineers followed de Havilland into private industry.

Once the threat from the Fokker monoplanes had been effectively contained by the introduction of a new generation of Allied fighters, such as the Airco D.H.2 and Nieuport 11, the rate of B.E.2c losses over the Western Front dropped to an acceptable level; official records indicate that during the second quarter of 1916, the B.E.2 actually had the lowest loss rates of all the major types then in use by the service. Encouraged by this, the RFC took delivery of large numbers of the BE.2e, which promised improved performance, and combined the stability of the B.E.2c with rather "lighter" controls (which held the promise of better manoeuvrability).

By the spring of 1917, however, conditions on the Western Front had changed again; the German fighter squadrons having been re-equipped with better fighters, especially the Albatros D.III. It had been planned that by this time B.E.2s in front-line service would have been replaced by newer aircraft, such as the Royal Aircraft Factory R.E.8 and Armstrong Whitworth F.K.8, but delivery of these types was initially slower than hoped. This situation culminated in what became known as "Bloody April", with the RFC losing 60 B.E.2s during that month.

An incident illustrating both the poor level of piloting skills with which new RFC pilots were sent to France in 1917 and the level of popularity of the B.E.2e on the Western Front at that time is recorded by Arthur Gould Lee, then a young RFC novice, in his book No Parachute. On 19 May 1917, six pilots, newly arrived in France and still to be allocated to a squadron, were each given a new B.E.2e to ferry between RFC depots at St Omer and Candas. One crashed in transit, three crashed on landing and one went missing (the pilot was killed). Lee, the pilot of the only aircraft to arrive safely, wrote in a letter to his wife:

I felt rather a cad not crashing too because everyone is glad to see death-traps like Quirks written off, especially new ones.

Fortunately, by this time, the B.E.2e was already being rapidly replaced on the Western Front by later types, but this was from several points of view more than a year too late.

=== Night fighter ===
As early as 1915, the B.E.2c entered service as a pioneer night fighter, being used in attempts to intercept and destroy the German airship raiders. The interceptor version of the B.E.2c was flown as a single-seater, outfitted with an auxiliary fuel tank on the centre of gravity in the position of the observer's seat.

Among other projected weapons intended to attack airships from above, including Ranken darts and small incendiary bombs, was the Fiery Grapnel. Developed at the Royal Aircraft Factory, the grapnel consisted of a two-inch long hollow steel shaft packed with an explosive charge and fitted with a sharp four-sided nose and metal plates that acted as fins; this would have been attached to a winch-mounted cable and carried by a single B.E.2. It was intended for the fighter to approach a Zeppelin from above, after which the grapnel would be dropped and appropriate manoeuvring employed to strike the surface of the Zeppelin with it: it then would bury itself and explode, causing ignition of the airship's hydrogen gas.

A simpler and much more practical solution proved to be to attack from below, using a Lewis gun firing a mixture of explosive and incendiary ammunition at an upwards angle of 45°. (Note: A similar tactic of firing from below was employed in the Second World War by German night fighters armed with the so-called Schräge Musik cannon installation.)

The new tactic proved to be highly effective. On the night of 2–3 September 1916, a single B.E.2c was credited with the downing of SL 11, the first German airship to be shot down over Britain after over a year of night raids. This feat led to the pilot, Captain William Leefe Robinson, being awarded a Victoria Cross and various cash prizes, totalling up to £3,500, that had been put up by a number of individuals.

This was not an isolated victory; five more German airships were destroyed by Home Defence B.E.2c interceptors between October and December 1916. As a consequence of these losses, the German Army's airship fleet ceased raids over England: German naval airship raiders of 1917 flew at higher altitudes to avoid interception, reducing their effectiveness. Daylight raids by heavier-than-air bombers were also planned.

The performance of the B.E.2 was inadequate to intercept airships flying at 15,000 feet much less the Gotha bombers that emerged during 1917, and its career as an effective home defence fighter was over.

=== Other fronts ===
While the majority of operational B.E.2s served on the Western Front, the type also saw limited use in other overseas theatres. At least one pair of B.E.2s were among the aircraft dispatched with No 3 Squadron for use in the Gallipoli Campaign. They were used to spot in support of naval bombardments, as well as being occasionally used to directly bomb ships and other targets.

As early as 1914, some B.E.2as went to Australia, where they served as trainer aircraft for the nascent Australian Flying Corps at Point Cook, Victoria. In a similar fashion, the type also was adopted at the Indian Flying School at Sitapur. Several B.E.2s were dispatched to Egypt to reinforce friendly forces fighting in the Eastern Mediterranean; on 16 April 1915, one aircraft participated in the bombing of El Murra.

A BE2e was lost in aerial combat over Salonika on 3 October 1917: the British pilot and observer were both killed and were buried by "The Bulgurs" with full military honours. Both were reinterred in Struma military cemetery.

=== Airship gondola ===
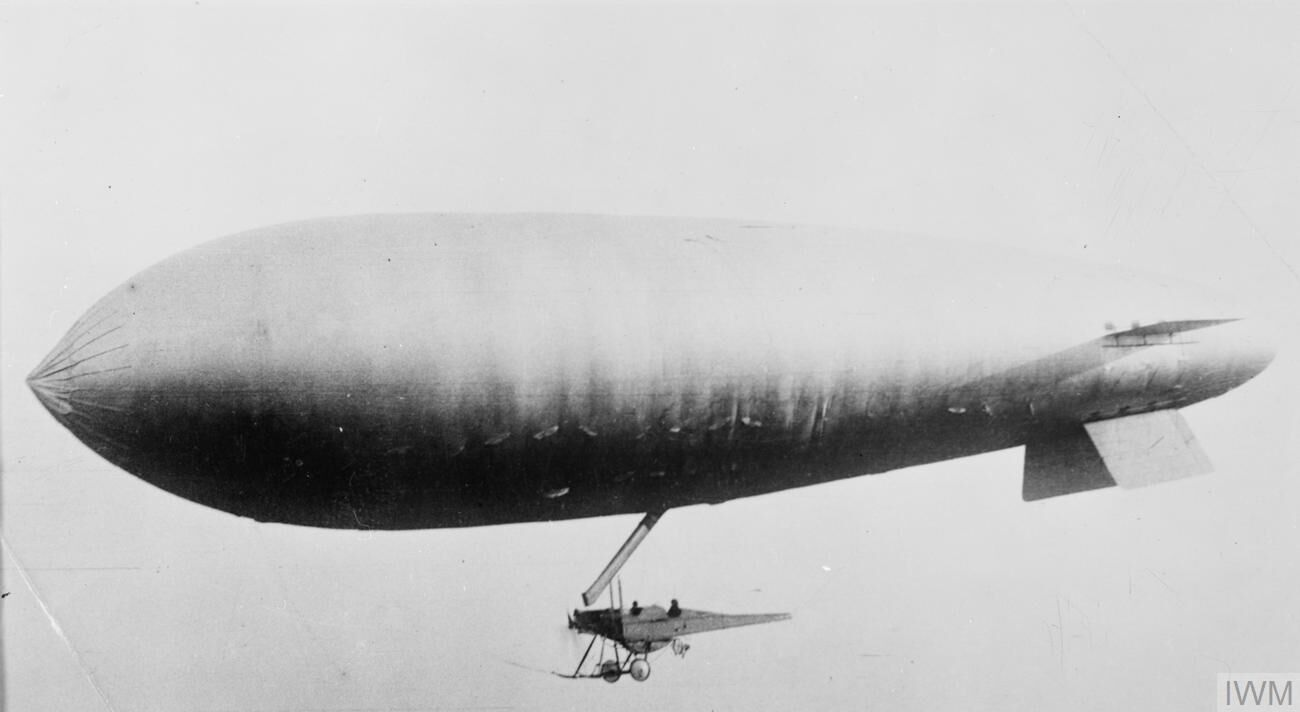
An SS class airship using a B.E.2 fuselage as a gondola

A number of B.E.2 fuselages were employed as makeshift gondolas for the hastily designed SS class "blimps", which were introduced into service by the Royal Naval Air Service for anti-submarine duties during March 1915. Later classes featured purpose-built gondolas.

=== Non-combat use ===
From 1917 onwards, the B.E.2 was generally withdrawn from both the front line and night fighter use. The surviving examples continued in use for submarine spotting and as trainers throughout the rest of the conflict. In spite of the type's rather unresponsive controls, it was capable of executing comprehensive (if somewhat stately) aerobatics, and was by no means a bad trainer.

On 19 February 1917, a B.E.2c was used to conduct the British Army's first aeromedical evacuation when it flew out the sole casualty of the raid on Bir el Hassana in the Sinai Peninsula. The man had a shattered ankle, and the 45-minute flight in the observer's seat spared him an agonizing multi-day journey by camel.

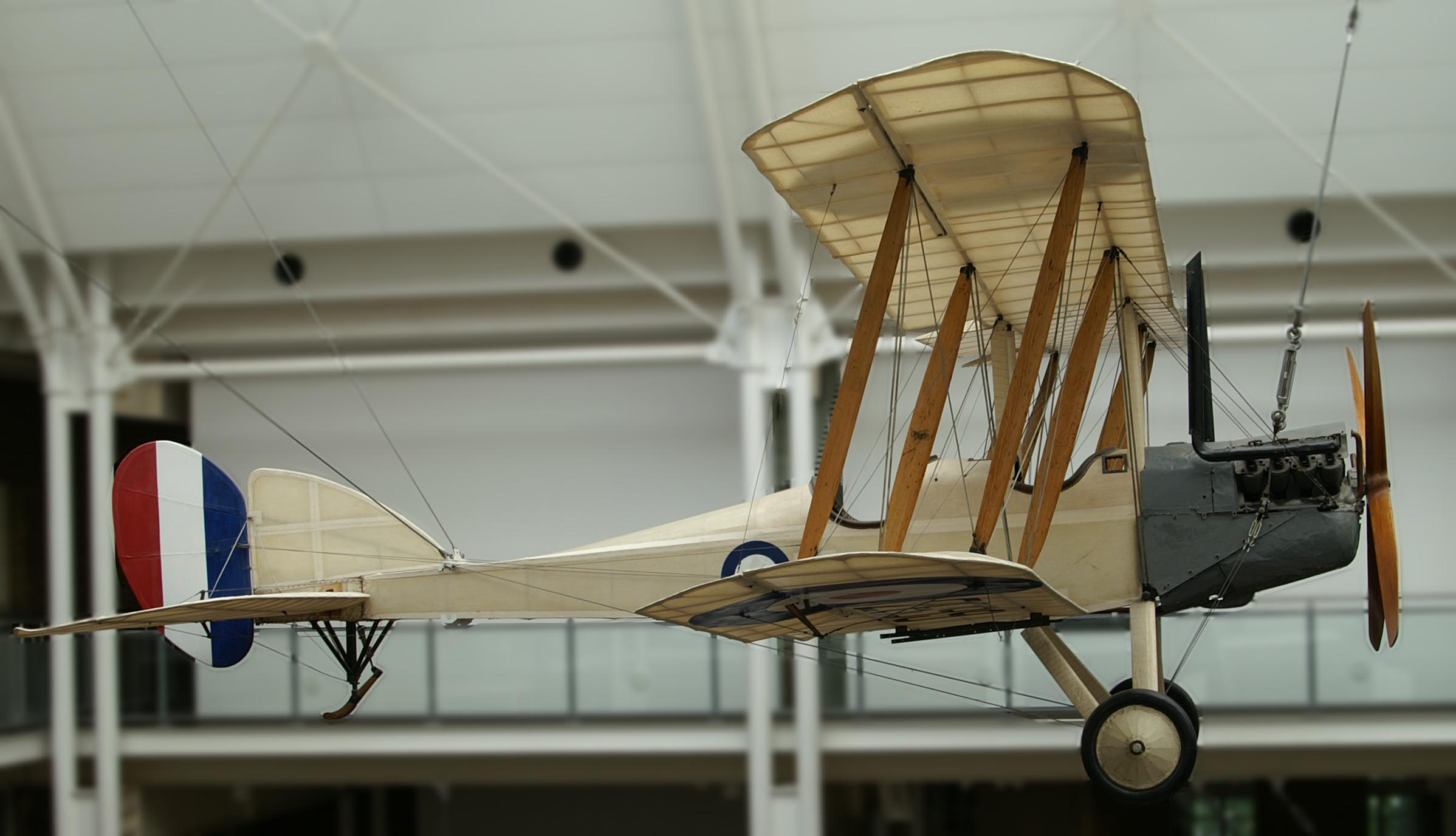
A B.E.2c at the Imperial War Museum in London

=== Post-war use ===
A B.E.2e was used to conduct the first flight across Australia, flying from Melbourne to Port Darwin. It was piloted by Captain H. N. Wrigley, accompanied by Sergeant A. W. Murphy. The 2,500 mi (4,000 km) journey, made between 16 November and 12 December 1919, involved a combined 46 hours of flying time.

Another B.E.2e was one of the first two aircraft (the other was an Avro 504K) owned by the new Australian airline Qantas when it was founded in Queensland in 1920–1921.

== Surviving aircraft and reproductions ==
Surviving restored aircraft and reproductions are on display at several museums, including the Imperial War Museum, Duxford; the Royal Air Force Museum London, Hendon; the Canada Aviation Museum, Ottawa; the Musée de l'Air et de l'Espace, Paris; the Militaire Luchtvaartmuseum, Soesterberg, Netherlands; United States Army Aviation Museum and the Norwegian Armed Forces Aircraft Collection at Oslo Airport, Gardermoen, Norway.

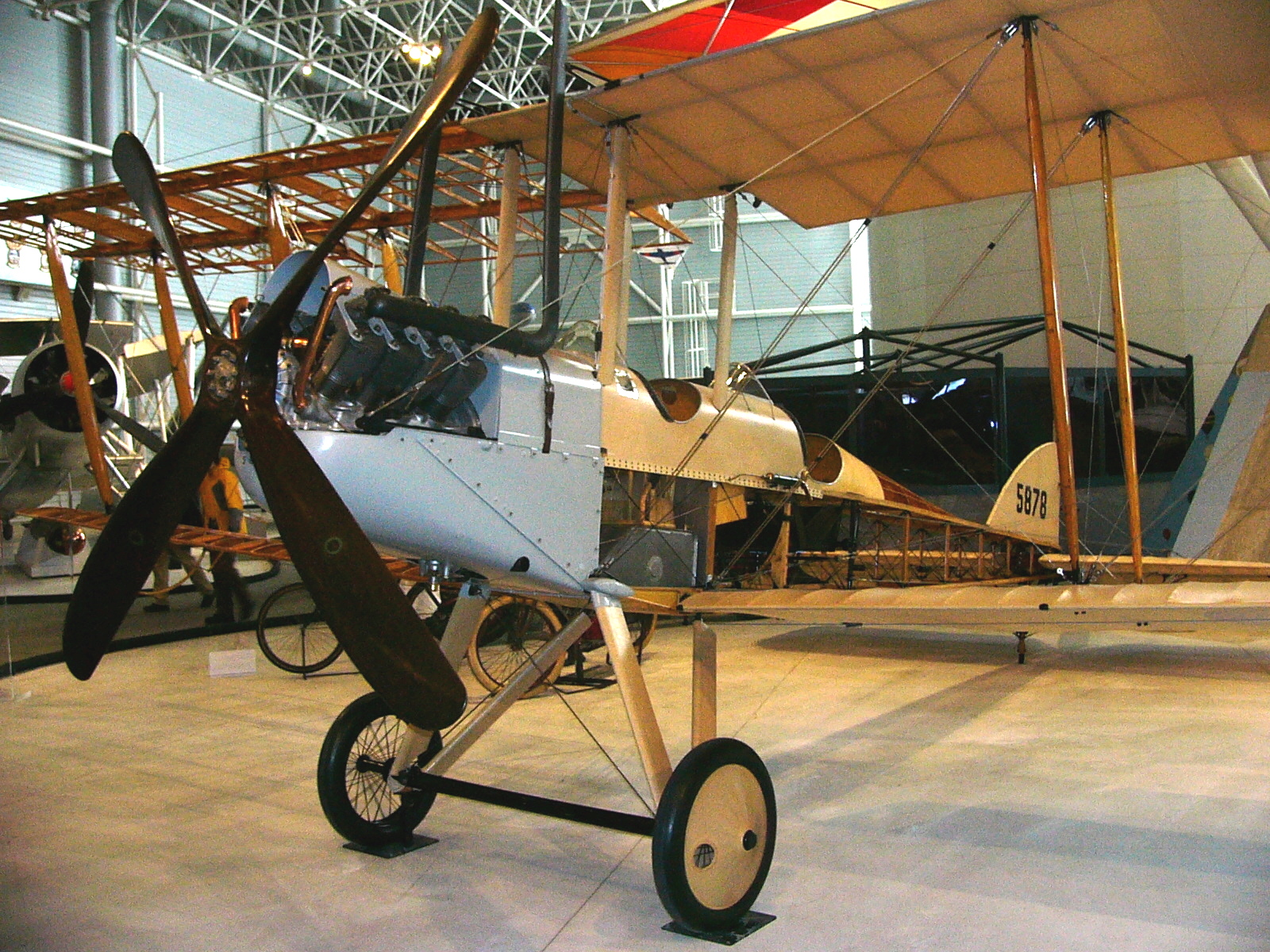
B.E.2c in the Canada Aviation and Space Museum

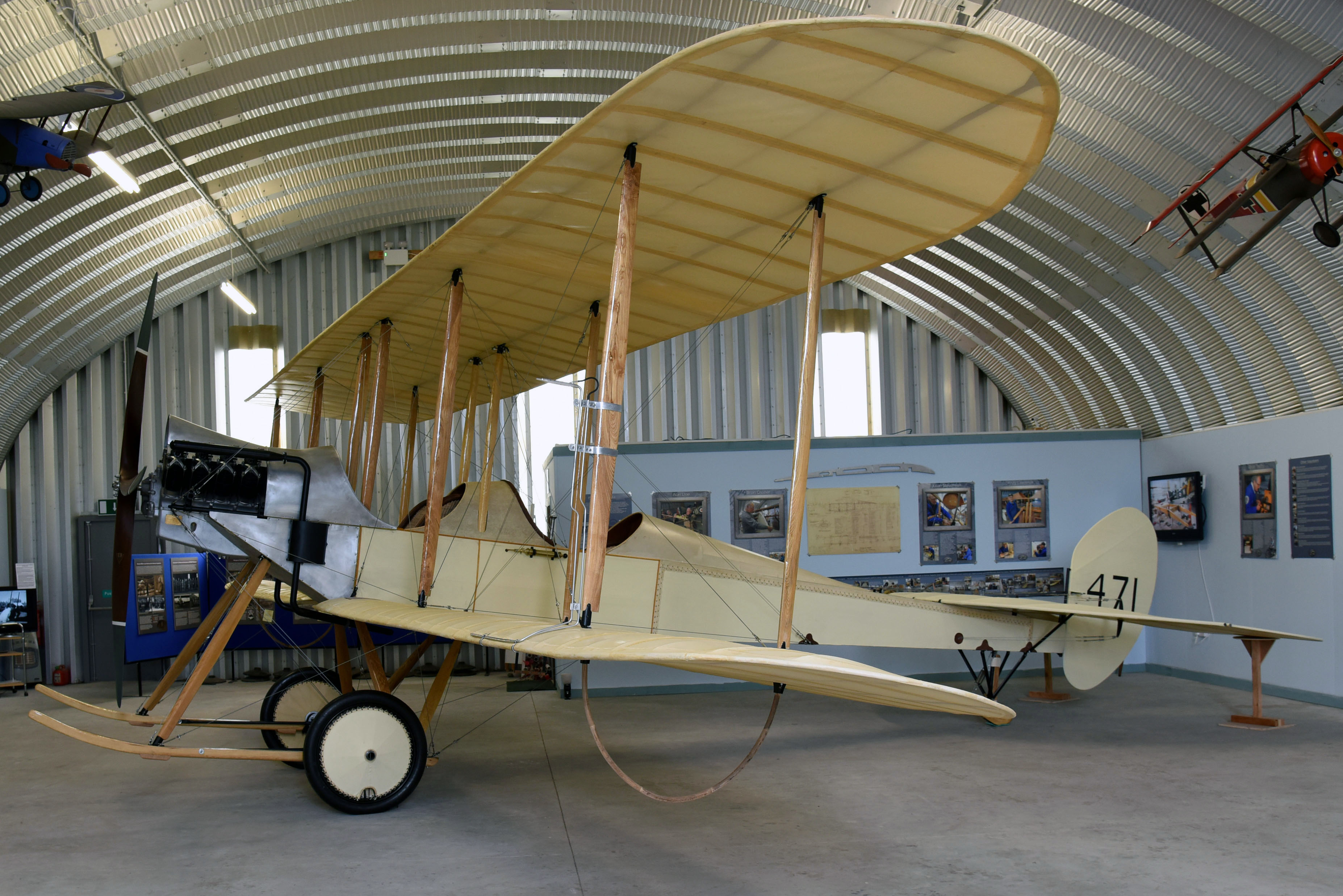
Replica of B.E.2a No.471 at Montrose Air Station Museum, Angus, Scotland

B.E.2f serial A1325 has been restored to airworthiness by The Vintage Aviator Ltd in New Zealand, with an original RAF1A V8 engine, and made its debut at the Classic Fighters Omaka airshow in April 2009. TVAL has also built several airworthy reproductions including c and f models, two of which are currently in the UK on loan to the WW1 Aviation Heritage Trust, and a BE.12.

A flying B.E.2c replica (registered G-AWYI) was built by pilot and engineer Charles Boddington at Sywell, UK in 1969 for use in the film Biggles Sweeps the Skies. The production was cancelled, and Boddington was killed the following year in an air crash during filming of the movie Von Richthofen & Brown. The B.E.2c itself was badly damaged in a crash in the United States in 1977 but Boddington's son Matthew returned it to flying condition in 2011. It flew with the Great War Display Team but was destroyed in an accident on 2 September 2020.

The UK's latest non-flying reproduction was completed around 2008 at Boscombe Down, Wiltshire, and is now displayed with the Boscombe Down Aviation Collection at Old Sarum.

A B.E.2a (an early variant with unequal span wings) was built from original plans and completed in February 2014. It is on display at the RAAF Museum, Point Cook, Victoria, Australia.

Volunteers at Montrose Air Station Museum, Angus, Scotland have built a full-size replica B.E.2a (No.471) from original plans and it is now on display. It has a precision-made replica Renault 70 hp engine.

The WW1 Aviation Heritage Trust has been operating a TVAL-built BE2e in England since 2014. It resides currently at Stow Maries Great War Aerodrome in Essex.

== Variants summary ==
- B.E.1: Prototype – important pioneer tractor biplane. The first B.E.2 was virtually identical, except for the engine originally installed.
  - B.E.5: Prototype, officially a rebuild of a Howard Wright biplane, powered by 60 hp (45 kW) ENV engine, otherwise similar to original B.E.2. First flight 27 June 1912. Rebuilt with Renault engine and effectively became a B.E.2.
  - B.E.6: Prototype, officially a rebuild of the Royal Aircraft Factory S.E.1. First flown 5 September 1912, powered by a 60 hp (45 kW) ENV engine like the B.E.5, but refitted with Renault before delivery to RFC later that month, as a B.E.2.
- B.E.2a: Initial production version of B.E.2. Built in small numbers from late 1912 – still a standard type at the outbreak of war in late 1914
- B.E.2b: basically, the same as the "a" with higher sides to the cockpits; late examples (perhaps those completed after the B.E.2c went into production) used ailerons instead of wing warping and featured other "c" characteristics such as "V" undercarriages and engine sump cowlings.
- B.E.2c: extensively redesigned to enhance stability, with a new tailplane and wings.
- B.E.2d: essentially a "c" variant with dual controls, and a larger gravity fuel tank

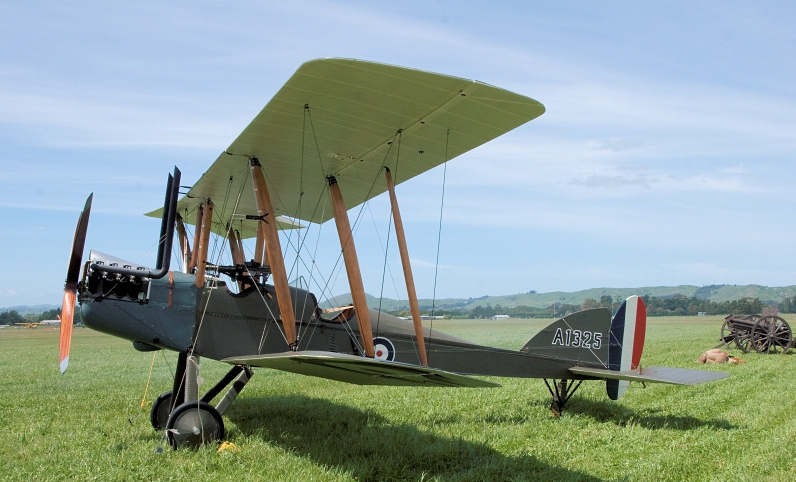
B.E.2f A1325 at Masterton, New Zealand, 2009

- B.E.2e: the final version, with new single-bay wings. Expected to be a great improvement on the "c", it was a major disappointment.
- B.E.2f: B.E.2c with B.E.2e wings.
- B.E.2g: B.E.2d with B.E.2e wings.
- B.E.9: B.E.2c with a wooden box (called a "pulpit", somewhat like the French SPAD S.A) in front of the propeller for an observer/gunner's seat. It remained a prototype only.
- B.E.12: single-seat B.E.2c with a synchronised gun and more powerful engine. The B.E.12a had B.E.2e wings.

== Operators ==
Australia

- Australian Flying Corps
  - No. 1 Squadron AFC in Egypt and Palestine
  - No. 4 Squadron AFC operated a single B.E.2e for training
  - No. 7 (Training) Squadron AFC in the United Kingdom
  - Mesopotamian Half Flight
- Central Flying School at Point Cook, Victoria

Belgium

- Belgian Air Force

Estonia

- Estonian Air Force

Greece

- Hellenic Navy

Netherlands

- Royal Netherlands Air Force operated a single aircraft only.

Norway

- Norwegian Army Air Service

South Africa

- Union Defence Force / South African Air Force

Serial numbers A3109 and A3110 built by Wolseley Motors Limited and nicknamed 'Rio de Janeiro Britons Nos. 1 & 2' were two of the first aircraft used by the South African Air Force
United Kingdom
Royal Flying Corps / Royal Air Force

- No. 2 Squadron
- No. 3 Squadron
- No. 4 Squadron
- No. 5 Squadron
- No. 6 Squadron
- No. 7 Squadron
- No. 8 Squadron
- No. 9 Squadron
- No. 10 Squadron
- No. 12 Squadron
- No. 13 Squadron
- No. 14 Squadron
- No. 15 Squadron
- No. 16 Squadron
- No. 17 Squadron
- No. 19 Squadron
- No. 21 Squadron
- No. 22 Squadron
- No. 23 Squadron
- No. 24 Squadron
- No. 25 Squadron
- No. 26 Squadron
- No. 28 Squadron
- No. 29 Squadron
- No. 30 Squadron
- No. 31 Squadron
- No. 33 Squadron
- No. 34 Squadron
- No. 36 Squadron
- No. 37 Squadron
- No. 38 Squadron
- No. 39 Squadron
- No. 42 Squadron
- No. 43 Squadron
- No. 46 Squadron
- No. 47 Squadron
- No. 49 Squadron
- No. 50 Squadron
- No. 51 Squadron
- No. 52 Squadron
- No. 53 Squadron
- No. 54 Squadron
- No. 55 Squadron
- No. 57 Squadron
- No. 58 Squadron
- No. 62 Squadron
- No. 63 Squadron
- No. 66 Squadron
- No. 67 Squadron
- No. 75 Squadron
- No. 76 Squadron
- No. 77 Squadron
- No. 78 Squadron
- No. 82 Squadron
- No. 91 Squadron
- No. 96 Squadron
- No. 98 Squadron
- No. 99 Squadron
- No. 100 Squadron
- No. 105 Squadron
- No. 110 Squadron
- No. 113 Squadron
- No. 114 Squadron
- No. 141 Squadron
- No. 142 Squadron
- No. 144 Squadron
- No. 187 Squadron
- No. 189 Squadron
- No. 190 Squadron
- No. 191 Squadron
- No. 269 Squadron
- No. 273 Squadron

Royal Naval Air Service

  - No. 1 Wing (Dunkirk)
  - No. 2 Wing (Imbros and Mudros)
  - No. 3 Wing (Imbros and Tenedos)
  - No. 7 (Naval) Squadron (East Africa)
  - Coastal Air Stations at Eastbourne, Hornsea, Great Yarmouth, Port Victoria, Redcar and Scarborough
  - Training schools at Chingford and Cranwell

United States

- American Expeditionary Force

== Specifications (B.E.2c – RAF 1a engine) ==
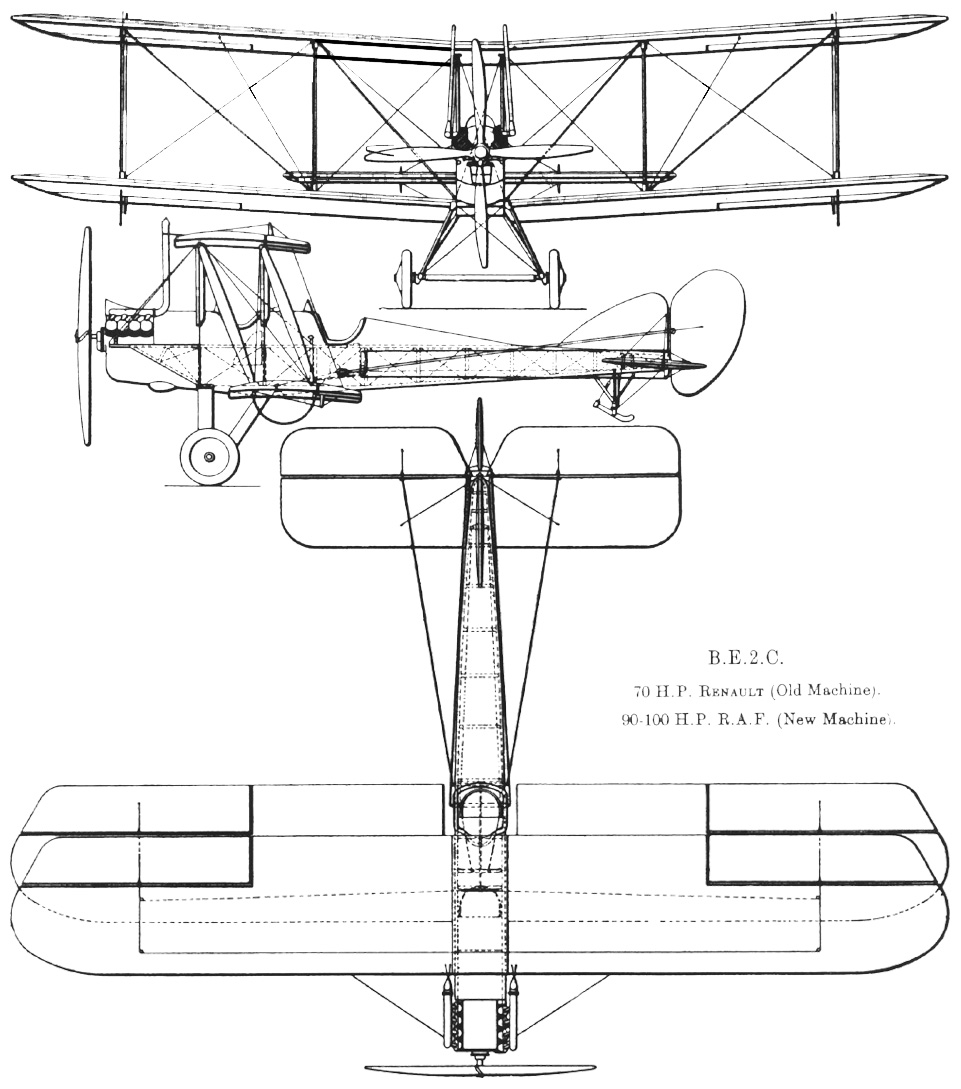
R.A.F. B.E.2c drawing

Data from British Aeroplanes 1914–18, The B.E.2, 2a and 2b

General characteristics

- Crew: Two
- Length: 27 ft 3 in (8.31 m)
- Wingspan: 37 ft 0 in (11.28 m)
- Height: 11 ft 1.5 in (3.391 m)
- Wing area: 371 sq ft (34.5 m^{2})
- Empty weight: 1,370 lb (621 kg)
- Gross weight: 2,350 lb (1,066 kg)
- Powerplant: 1 × RAF 1a V-8 air-cooled piston engine, 90 hp (67 kW)
- Propellers: 4-bladed wooden fixed-pitch propeller

Performance

- Maximum speed: 72 mph (116 km/h, 63 kn) at 6,500 ft (2,000 m)
- Endurance: 3 hours 15 minutes
- Service ceiling: 10,000 ft (3,000 m)
- Time to altitude:

- 3,500 ft (1,100 m) in 6 minutes 30 seconds
- 10,000 ft (3,000 m) in 45 minutes 15 seconds

- Wing loading: 6.3 lb/sq ft (31 kg/m^{2})

Armament

- Guns: Normally 1 × .303 in (7.7 mm) Lewis gun for observer, sometimes several.
- Bombs: 224 lb (102 kg) of bombs (with full bomb load it was usually flown as a single-seater as unarmed)

== See also ==
Related development

- B.E.9
- B.E.12

Aircraft of comparable role, configuration, and era

- Aviatik B.I
- Albatros B.I
- LVG B.I

Related lists

- List of aircraft of the Royal Air Force
- List of aircraft of the Royal Flying Corps
