= Martinsyde =

British aircraft and motorcycle manufacturer

- Type: Private
- Industry: Motorcycle, Aviation
- Founded: 1908
- Founder: H.P. Martin and George Handasyde
- Defunct: 1922
- Fate: Liquidated after a factory fire
- Headquarters: Woking and Brooklands, England
- Key people: H.P. Martin and George Handasyde
- Products: Motorcycles, Aircraft

Martinsyde was a British aircraft and motorcycle manufacturer between 1908 and 1922, when it was forced into liquidation by a factory fire.

== History ==
The company was first formed in 1908 as a partnership between H.P. Martin and George Handasyde and is known as Martin & Handasyde. Their No.1 monoplane was built in 1908–1909 and succeeded in lifting off the ground before being wrecked in a gale. They went on to build a succession of largely monoplane designs although it was a biplane, the S.1 of 1914, that turned Martin-Handasyde into a successful aircraft manufacturer.

In 1915 they renamed the company Martinsyde Ltd, and it became Britain's third largest aircraft manufacturer during World War One, with flight sheds at Brooklands and a large factory in nearby Woking.

== Martinsyde Motorcycles ==
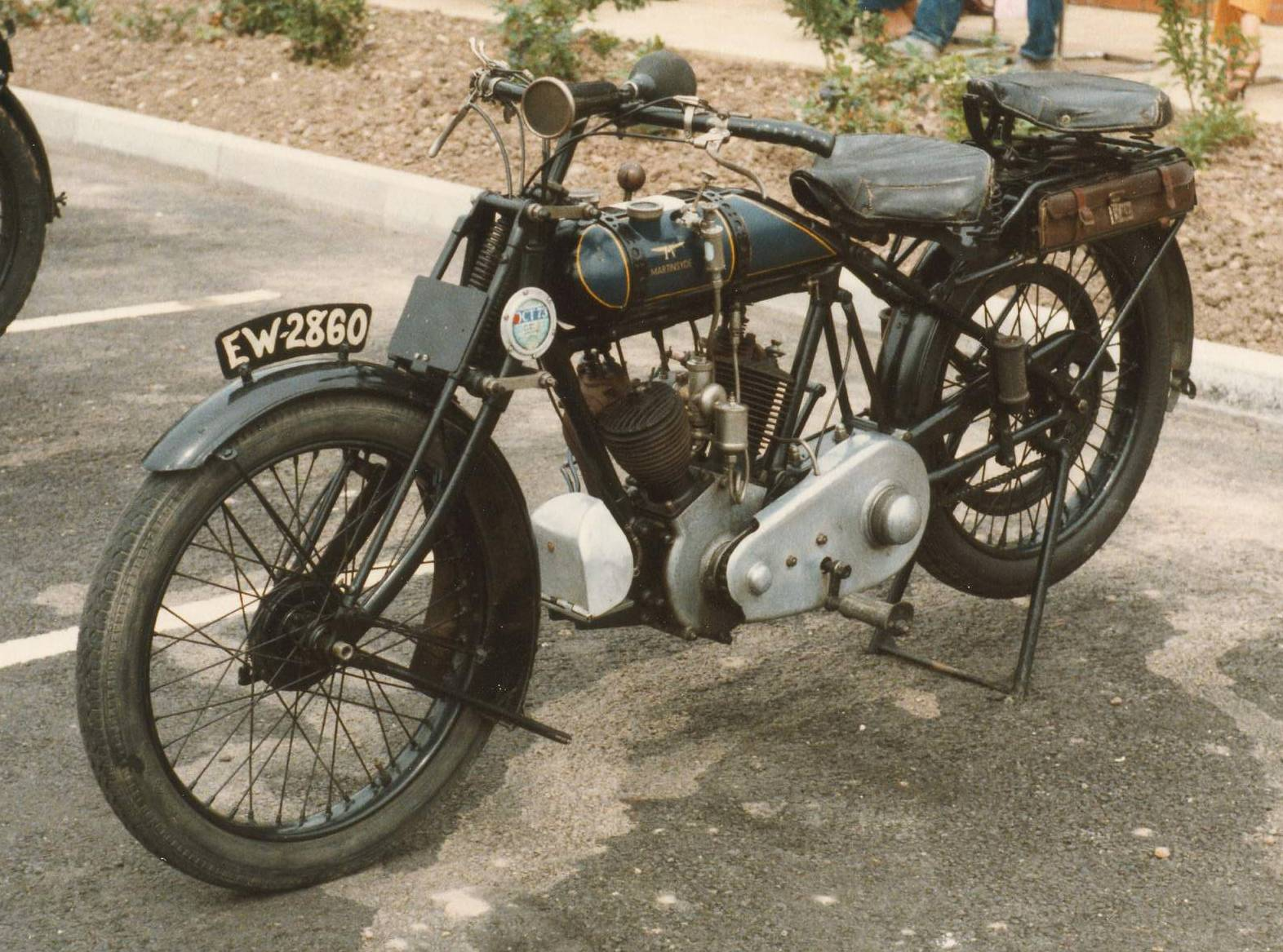
Martinsyde motorcycle, 1922, model C, 498 cc

Martinsyde began manufacturing motorcycles in 1919 after buying the rights to engine designs by Howard Newman, which included a 350 cc single and a 677 cc V-twin with an unusual exhaust-over-inlet layout.

The 680 engine was fitted into a diamond-type frame with Brampton forks. Martinsyde had to overcome problems with components before its new range could be launched, initially under the trade name of Martinsyde-Newman, until the third partner Newman left the company. (Newman was also involved in manufacturing and designing Ivy motorcycles.) The V-twin motorcycle had a hand gear change, and a three-speed gearbox built under licence from AJS. Martinsyde's engine was very flexible and became popular for off-road trials competition, where the singles quickly gained a reputation for reliability, at Brooklands, where Martinsyde won the team award in 1922, and the Scottish Six Days Trial.

Martinsyde motorcycles were offered with sidecars and the Martinsyde 680 was followed by a 500 cc model in 1920, with a sports version in 1921. In 1922 Martinsyde produced a 738 cc sports V-twin, named the Quick Six which produced 22 horsepower (16 kW) and was capable of 80 miles per hour (130 km/h). The engine featured the company's normal overhead exhaust and side-valve inlet, but with Ricardo pistons, accurately balanced flywheels, all reciprocating parts lightened, nickel steel con-rods machined all over, and close ratio three speed gearbox. Martinsyde was experimenting with new designs, including valve gear controlled by leaf springs, when its Woking factory was destroyed by a fire in 1922, forcing the company into liquidation after producing over 2,000 motorcycles. Martinsyde's motorcycle manufacturing rights were purchased by Bat Motor Manufacturing Co. Ltd, which produced a number of twin-cylinder motorcycles in 1924 and 1925 before ending production.

11 May 1922, Motor Cycle magazine features new Martinsyde Quick Six

== Martinsyde aircraft ==
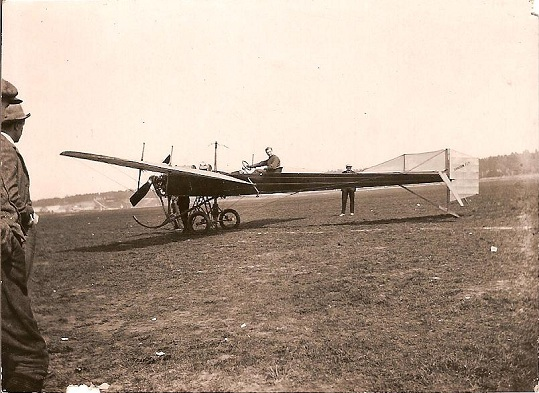
Martin-Handasyde No.4B Dragonfly, 1911 at Brooklands

Martinsyde-designed aircraft included:

- Martin-Handasyde No.3 – sports aircraft, 1910
- Martinsyde S.1 – single-seat scout, 1914
- G100 and G102 "Elephant" – scout aircraft 1915 onwards, 171
- Martinsyde RG
- Martinsyde F.1
- Martinsyde F.2
- Martinsyde F.3 – private venture design with the Rolls-Royce Falcon engine, only a few produced due to lack of available engines
- Martinsyde F.4 Buzzard – fighter, the F.3 with a Hispano-Suiza engine
- Martinsyde Semiquaver – racing aircraft

A number of surplus Buzzard airframe were later built up with a new engine, the radial Armstrong Siddeley Jaguar, by the Aircraft Disposal Company (ADC) and sold as the "Martinsyde ADC.1" in 1924. A development of the F.4 was also made by the ADC: two "ADC Nimbus" were produced as prototypes. The company also manufactured the BE.2c and S.E.5a aircraft under sub-contract.
