= Sunbeam Afridi =

1910s British piston aircraft engine

Afridi
- Type: V12 water-cooled, piston engine
- National origin: Britain
- Manufacturer: Sunbeam
- Designer: Louis Coatalen
- First run: 1916
- Number built: July 1916 to June 1917

The Sunbeam Afridi was an aero-engine produced by Sunbeam during the First World War.

== Design and development ==
Conceived to replace the Crusader/Zulu on the production lines, Louis Coatalen designed a companion engine for the V12 Cossack, giving it the name Afridi. The Afridi was a much smaller engine than the Cossack and also spawned a whole family of derivative engines.

The major attributes of the Afridi were a bore of 92 mm (3.62 in) and stroke of 135 mm (5.31 in) displacing 11.476 L (700.3 cu in) for a power output of 200 hp (149 kW)at 2,000rpm. The twin overhead camshafts were driven by gears, directly operating two inlet and two exhaust valves per cylinder. Two Claudel-Hobson carburettors on the outsides of the blocks fed mixture to the cylinders, where it was ignited by the dual ignition system energised by four 6-cyl magnetos.

Three hundred Afridis were ordered, of which 299 were delivered and 100 converted to Sunbeam Maoris. Service use was mainly in Curtiss R.2 tractor biplanes and various Short seaplanes.

== Maori ==
A direct development of the Afridi, the Sunbeam Maori was far more successful. In similar fashion to Coatalen′s development of Sunbeam's side-valve engines he increased the bore to 100 mm (3.94 in) retaining the stroke of 135 mm (5.31 in), displacing 12.27 L (748.8 cu in) for a power output of 260 hp (194 kW) at 2,000rpm driving a geared propeller.

Production of the Maori began in April 1917, including 100 Afridis which were converted to Maoris on the production line as the Maori Mk.I, with new-build Maoris designated as Maori Mk.II. Converted Afridis, (Maori Mk.I), were rated at 250 hp (186 kW) at 2,000rpm, whilst new-build Maori Mk.IIs were rated at 260 hp (194 kW) at 2,000rpm.

Maoris found favour with Short and Fairey seaplanes as well as Handley Page O/400 bombers, with development continuing to give the Maori Mk.III and Maori Mk.IV. The Maori Mk.III introduced cylinder banks with exhaust ports on the outside rather than the inside of the Vee and the carburettors on the inside. The Mk.III was rated at 275 hp (205 kW).

The final Maori version was designed specifically for use in airships as the Maori Mk.IV, with controls mounted directly on the rear of the engine, flywheel, enlarged cooling system and water-cooled exhaust pipes. Fitted to R33 and R34, five Maori Mk.IVs were fitted to each airship in gondolas, allowing the engines to be tended by on-board mechanics.

== Manitou ==
The Sunbeam Manitou was a further development of the V12 Maori Mk.III; work on it began by Louis Coatalen in 1917, using aluminium alloy rather than cast iron blocks, cast in blocks of three cylinders, a typical Sunbeam feature. Bore was increased to 110 mm (4.33 in), but stroke remained at 135 mm (5.31 in). The cylinder bank were at a 60° vee, with twin overhead camshafts on each bank operating four valves per cylinder. Two Claudel-Hobson carburettors and two BTH magnetos delivered mixture to the cylinders and ignited it. Fitted with a reduction gear for aircraft the engine developed 300 hp (224 kW) at 2,000rpm., later increased to 325 hp (242 kW). Unsuccessful as an aero-engine, it is best known for having powered the Sunbeam 350HP racing car.

Despite large orders for 840 Manitous, only 13 were built before production stopped. Those that were built found favour as motor-boat power-plants and only one flew trials in a Short 184 seaplane. Four were fitted to the 'Maple Leaf V' and a specially built Manitou was fitted to the 350hp Sunbeam racing car.

=== 350hp Sunbeam ===
The Manitou was noteworthy for being fitted to the 350hp Sunbeam racing car in 1920, which was later bought by Malcolm Campbell to set land speed records and became one of Campbell's Blue Birds.

Coatalen redesigned the engine substantially for use in the 350 hp Sunbeam car. The twin-cam four-valve head was replaced by a single-cam three-valve head, possibly from the Arab, the increase in bore to 120 mm allowing space for three valves.

To ensure adequate bearing surface at the big ends Coatalen retained the articulated connecting rods, where one rod runs on the crankshaft journal, but the other acts indirectly, through a journal on the other rod. The difficulty is that this gives a slightly different piston stroke and journal rotation centres for each bank, which can lead to unbalance and possible vibration problems. Stroke was thus 135 mm on one bank and 142 mm on the other.

After initial use by Coatalen, the car was sold to Sir Malcolm Campbell for an attempt at the world land speed record.

== Tartar ==
The Sunbeam Tartar was an obscure experimental engine intended for use on airships. The V12 Tartar was of radically different construction in that individual cylinders formed each bank as opposed to groups of three in integral blocks. Built in prototype form only, the Tartar retained the 110 mm (4.33 in) bore, 135 mm (5.31 in) stroke, and dual ignition system of the Manitou; but introduced a single overhead camshaft operating the four valves in each cylinder via rockers. From its 15.4 L (939.8 cu in) displacement the Tartar developed 300 hp (224 kW) but failed to gain any orders; however it may have provided inspiration for the large Sunbeam Sikh airship engine which also had individual cylinders.

== Applications ==
- Data from:
- Armstrong-Whitworth FK.10 (Afridi)
- Avro 519 (Afridi)
- Avro 529 Silver King (Maori)
- Curtiss H.12 (Maori)
- Curtiss R.2 (Afridi)
- Fairey F.2a Patrol (Maori)
- Fairey F.22 Campania (Maori)
- Fairey III (Maori)
- Grahame-White E.IV Ganymede (Maori)
- Handley Page O/100 (Maori)
- Handley Page O/400 (Maori)
- HM Airship R.33 (Maori)
- HM Airship R.34 (Maori)
- Parnall Zeppelin-Strafer (Maori)
- Royal Aircraft Factory CE.1 (Maori)
- Royal Aircraft Factory RE.9 (Maori)
- Short Improved Navyplane (Afridi)
- Short N.2A Scout (Afridi)
- Short N.2B (Maori)
- Short Type 184 (Maori) (Manitou)
- Vickers FB.27 Vimy (Maori)
- Wight Tractor seaplane (Maori)

== Specifications (Maori II) ==
Data from Sunbeam Aero-Engines

=== General characteristics ===
- Type: V12 Water-cooled 60 degree piston engine
- Bore: 100 mm (3.94 in)
- Stroke: 135 mm (5.31 in)
- Displacement: 12.27 L (748.8 cu in)
- Length: 1,612.9 mm (63.50 in)
- Width: 850.9 mm (33.50 in)
- Height: 873.76 mm (34.40 in)
- Dry weight: 490 kg (1,080.27 lb)
- Designer: Louis Coatalen

=== Components ===
- Valvetrain: Twin overhead camshafts, four valves per cylinder
- Fuel system: Gravity feed to four Claudel Hobson CZS 38 mm (1.50 in) carburettors
- Fuel type: Gasoline
- Oil system: Dry sump pressure feed
- Cooling system: Water-cooled by radiator

=== Performance ===
- Power output: 260 hp (194 kW) at 2,000rpm
- Compression ratio: 5.3:1

== See also ==
Comparable engines

- Rolls-Royce Falcon

Related lists

- List of aircraft engines
