= Parnall Perch =

Perch

General information
- Type: Trainer aircraft
- National origin: United Kingdom
- Manufacturer: George Parnall and Company
- Designer: Harold Bolas
- Number built: 1

History
- First flight: 10 December 1926

The Parnall Perch was a single-engined, side-by-side-seat aircraft designed in the UK to meet an Air Ministry specification for a general-purpose trainer. Only one Perch was constructed, and no contract was ever awarded with this specification.

== Design and development ==
The Parnall Perch was Parnall's response to Air Ministry specification 5/24, which called for a two-seat naval training aircraft capable of land, deck or water-based operation. It was to provide RAF advanced training, Fleet Air Arm deck landing practice and seaplane conversion experience. Many manufacturers tendered and out of these three gained orders for prototypes: Vickers, with their Vendace I, Blackburn with the Sprat and Parnall. All three aircraft were named after fish, as the Air Ministry required for Naval aircraft at the time. All used the Rolls-Royce Falcon engine, but Parnall alone decided to design a side-by-side seat aircraft, with its ease of communication between instructor and pupil.

The Perch had a wooden structure covered with fabric. It had wings of equal span and constant chord with no sweep but some stagger. Horn balanced ailerons were fitted to both upper and lower wings. The Perch was a two bay biplane, though the inner interplane struts were close to the fuselage. Just inboard of these struts and on each side, pairs of bracing struts linked the two forward wing spars via a connection to the fuselage centre line, with a similar connection between the rear spars.

From the wings rearwards, the fuselage was flat sided, but the top was built up, with the pilots sitting with their eyes near upper wing level, where there was a cut-out in the trailing edge. Forwards the upper fuselage fell away, blending into a metal engine cowling which continued to decrease in depth. This gave the pilots an excellent view over the nose, as required particularly for deck landings. The engine was a 270 hp (200 kW) V-12 Rolls-Royce Falcon III, a water-cooled unit that ran upright so that the propeller shaft was at the bottom of the fuselage, helping the forward view. Long exhaust pipes ran on either side, back beyond the trailing edge. For at least part of its life, the Perch had a large radiator between the undercarriage legs. At the rear, the fin and horn balanced rudder together were almost circular. The rudder extended to the keel, operating between the split, balanced elevators. The tailplane, to which these were hinged, was mounted on the top of the fuselage. There was a tall, V-shaped tailskid mounted just ahead of the fin leading edge.

The Perch had a two-wheel, solid-axle undercarriage, mounted on oleo legs joined to the fuselage close to the leading edge of the wing and the engine bulkhead. It was braced by rearward struts. The same legs and struts were used when wheels were replaced by floats, though they were augmented with a pair of struts about two-thirds the way along the float, steeply angled back to the lower fuselage. The floats had a step close to their tip; there was no water-rudder.

The Perch made its first flight from Parnall's base at Yate on 10 December 1926. The pilot was Frank Courtney, who had become their test pilot in 1925. After test flying from Yate, the Perch went to the A&AAE at RAF Martlesham Heath on 5 April 1927, its designer Harold Bolas travelling as a passenger. After contractor's trials there, it went on later that month to the MAEE at Felixstowe for sea trials. At the end of the trials, the Vendace I was judged best to have met the specifications, but none of the competitors received a contract to build more.

== Specifications ==
Data from Wixey 1990, p. 137

General characteristics

- Crew: 2
- Length: 29 ft 6 in (8.99 m)
- Wingspan: 40 ft 0 in (12.19 m)
- Height: 13 ft (4.0 m)
- Empty weight: 2,800 lb (1,270 kg)
- Gross weight: 4,500 lb (2,041 kg)
- Powerplant: 1 × Rolls-Royce Falcon III V-12 water-cooled, 270 hp (200 kW)

Performance

- Maximum speed: 115 mph (185 km/h, 100 kn)
- Cruise speed: 98 mph (158 km/h, 85 kn)
- Range: 500 mi (800 km, 430 nmi)
- Service ceiling: 12,000 ft (3,700 m)
- Time to altitude: 11 min to 5,000 ft (1,525 m)

== Cited sources ==
- Andrews, C. F.; Morgan, E. B. (1988). Vickers Aircraft since 1908 (2nd ed.). London: Putnam. ISBN 0-85177-815-1.
- Jackson, A. J. (1968). Blackburn Aircraft since 1909. London: Putnam Publishing. ISBN 0-370-00053-6.
- Wixey, Kenneth (1990). Parnall Aircraft since 1914. Annopolis: Naval Institute Press. ISBN 1-55750-930-1.
