= Bristol Tourer =

Tourer
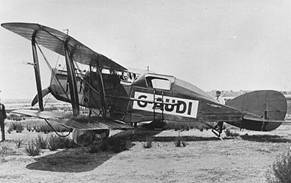
- A Bristol Tourer operated by Western Australian Airways

General information
- Type: Civil utility aircraft
- Manufacturer: Bristol

History
- First flight: January 1919

The Bristol Tourer was a British civil utility biplane produced in the years following the First World War, using as much as possible from the design of the Bristol Fighter aircraft. Bristol Tourers were delivered with a variety of engines, subject to availability and customer desires; these included the Rolls-Royce Falcon, Siddeley Puma, Hispano-Suiza 8, and Wolseley Viper. Many Tourers were fitted with a canopy to cover the one or two passenger seats in the rear cockpit, giving the type its original name of Coupé. The pilot's cockpit, however, remained open.

Bristol Tourers operated by Western Australian Airways made the first scheduled airline services in Australia, commencing on 4 December 1921 between Perth and Geraldton.

== Variants ==
Type 27
First Tourers for the British Controller of Civil Aviation, fitted with Rolls-Royce Falcon engines and dual controls (3 built)
Type 28
Similar to Type 27 with canopy for rear seat
Type 29
Siddeley Puma-engined version for Bristol as company transport (2 built)
Type 45 "Scandinavian Tourer"
Similar to Type 29 with ski undercarriage.
Type 47
Three-seat version with open rear cockpit.
Type 48
Similar to Type 47 but built as floatplane.
Type 81 "Puma Trainer"
Similar to Type 29 modified as trainer (1 converted, 4 newly built)
Type 81A
Similar to Type 81 with revised undercarriage and empennage for Greek military (6 built)
Type 86 "Greek Tourer"
Similar to original Bristol Fighter and able to be armed for Greek Air Force (6 built)
Type 86A
Three-seat version of Type 86.
Type 88 "Bulgarian Tourer"
Powered by Wolseley Viper for Bulgarian Post Office, two aircraft were delivered in April 1924.
Type 88A "Improved Bulgarian Tourer"
With various modifications, three aircraft delivered in 1926.

== Operators ==
Australia

- Western Australian Airways

Bulgaria

- Bulgarian Air Force
- Bulgarian Post Office

Chile

- Chilean Air Force

Greece

- Greek Air Force

== Specifications (Type 28) ==
General characteristics

- Crew: One pilot
- Capacity: 1 passenger
- Length: 26 ft 1 in (7.95 m)
- Wingspan: 39 ft 5 in (12.01 m)
- Height: 10 ft 1 in (3.07 m)
- Wing area: 407 sq ft (37.8 m^{2})
- Empty weight: 1,900 lb (850 kg)
- Gross weight: 3,000 lb (1,400 kg)
- Powerplant: 1 × Siddeley Puma , 240 hp (179 kW)

Performance

- Maximum speed: 120 mph (193 km/h, 100 kn)
- Range: 400 mi (644 km, 350 nmi)
- Service ceiling: 20,000 ft (6,095 m)
