= Fairey N.9 =

1917 British floatplane

N.9
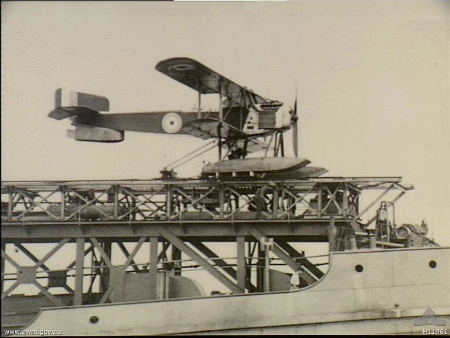
- N.9 during the catapult trials

General information
- Type: Shipboard floatplane
- National origin: United Kingdom
- Manufacturer: Fairey Aviation Company
- Status: Prototype
- Number built: 1

History
- First flight: 5 July 1917

The Fairey N.9 (also known as the F.127) was a British experimental floatplane of the First World War; only one was built. It carried out the first shipborne catapult launches from Royal Navy ships, and was later sold to Norway.

== Development and design ==
In 1917 Fairey Aviation produced two separate designs to meet Admiralty Specification N.2(a) for a two-seat carrier-based seaplane for the Royal Naval Air Service, one powered by a Rolls-Royce Falcon engine, and a larger aircraft powered by a more powerful Sunbeam Maori. The smaller aircraft, usually known by its serial number N.9, but also by its constructor's number F.127, flew first on 5 July 1917, with the larger aircraft (serial number N.10), the prototype Fairey III, flying in September.

N.9 was a compact biplane with single-bay wings of unequal span that folded back for shipboard stowage. It was fitted with trailing edge flaps on both the upper and lower wings. Power was from a 200 hp (149 kW) Rolls-Royce Falcon engine with radiators on each side of the engine.

Its performance was below the requirements of the specification, and no production followed.

== Operational history ==
Although not chosen for production, N.9 was chosen for trials of catapult launching. After strengthening, it was sent to the Port Victoria Marine Experimental Aircraft Depot for tests with the catapult trials ship, HMS Slinger in June 1918, carrying out the first catapult launches of a seaplane from a Royal Navy ship.

N.9 was bought back from the Royal Navy and fitted with a Maori engine and equal span wings. It was sold to the Royal Norwegian Navy in May 1920, then sold for civil use in 1927, and wrecked in a crash on 12 June 1928.

== Specifications ==
Data from Fairey Aircraft since 1915

General characteristics

- Crew: 2
- Length: 35 ft 6 in (10.82 m)
- Wingspan: 50 ft 0 in (15.24 m)
- Height: 13 ft 0 in (3.96 m)
- Wing area: 456 sq ft (42.4 m^{2})
- Empty weight: 2,699 lb (1,224 kg)
- Gross weight: 3,812 lb (1,729 kg)
- Powerplant: 1 × Rolls-Royce Falcon I water-cooled V12 engine, 200 hp (150 kW)

Performance

- Maximum speed: 90 mph (140 km/h, 78 kn) at sea level
- Endurance: 5 1/4 hr
- Service ceiling: 8,600 ft (2,600 m)
- Time to altitude:
  - 4 min 10 s to 2,000 ft (610 m)
  - 38 min to 10,000 ft (3,000 m)

Armament

- Guns: 1× .303 in Lewis gun on Scarff ring in rear cockpit.
- Bombs: Provision for two 112 lb (51 kg) bombs

== See also ==
Related development

- Fairey III
