= Winton Aerodrome (closed 1935) =

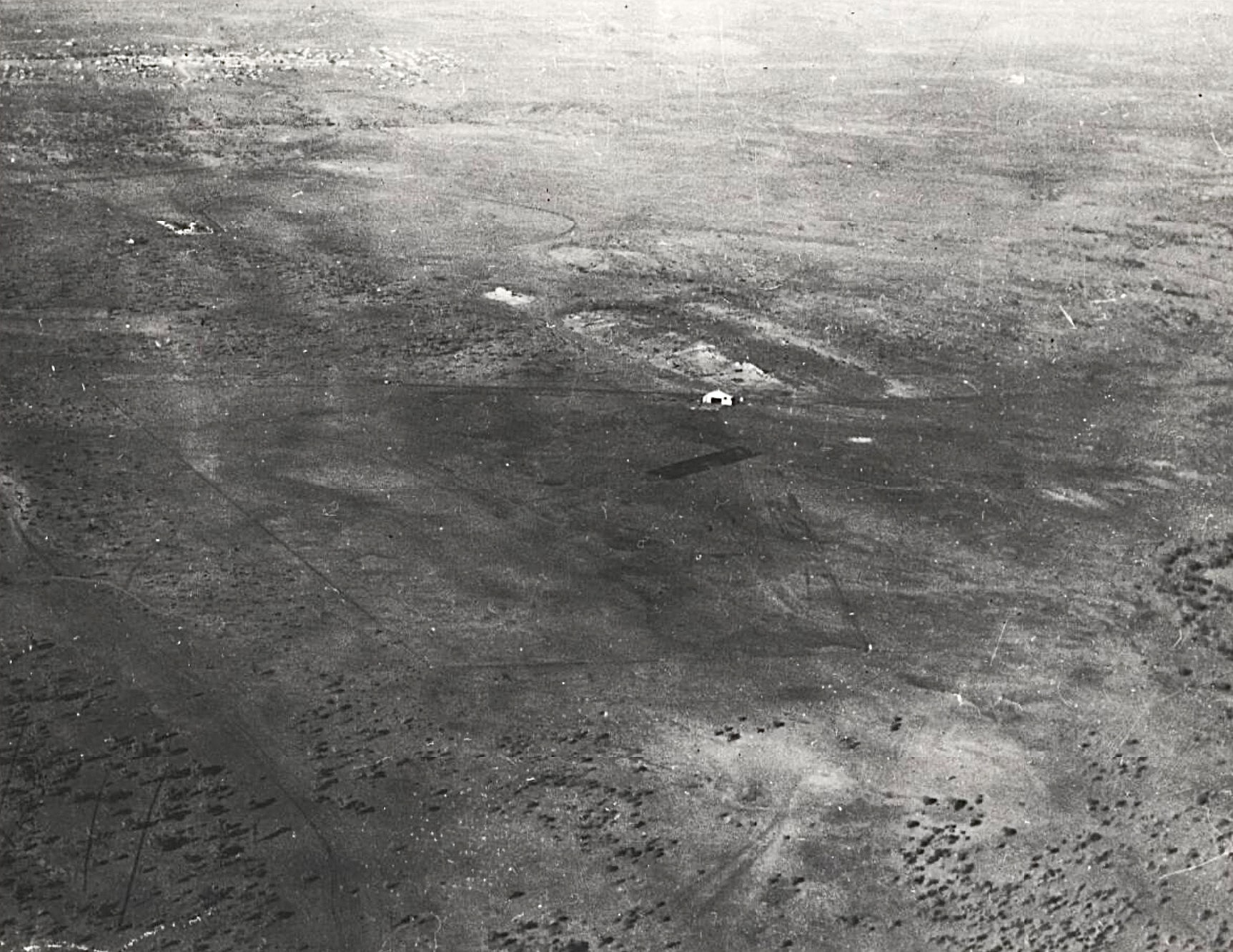
- Aerial view of Winton Aerodrome in 1926.
- IATA: none; ICAO: none

Summary
- Opened: 1921
- Closed: 1935
- Coordinates: 22°21′38.69″S 143°03′20.86″E

Map
- Location in Queensland

Winton Aerodrome was an early airfield located north of Winton, Queensland in Australia. It was the birthplace of Australian flag carrier Qantas, and saw frequent visits by renowned aviators and Australian politicians. It was replaced by the new and larger Winton Aerodrome in 1935, when the council sought a permit for flights involving larger aircraft.

== History ==
On 16 November 1920, the Queensland and Northern Territory Aerial Services (Qantas) Ltd. was established at Winton by Paul McGinness and Hudson Fysh, which was later shortened and became Qantas. In February 1921, Qantas opened a commercial service between Winton and Longreach operated by an Avro 504 and Avro 547, one of which piloted by Hudson Fysh. On 13 April 1921, 50 acres of the Police Reserve was set aside for the development of an aerodrome, with $100 allocated by the council for improvements. It was located north of Winton, east of the Meatworks and the Hughenden Road. The grading and leveling of the landing ground took place throughout September 1922, preparing it for all-weather operations. Qantas would also fly a mail service two times a week from the aerodrome.

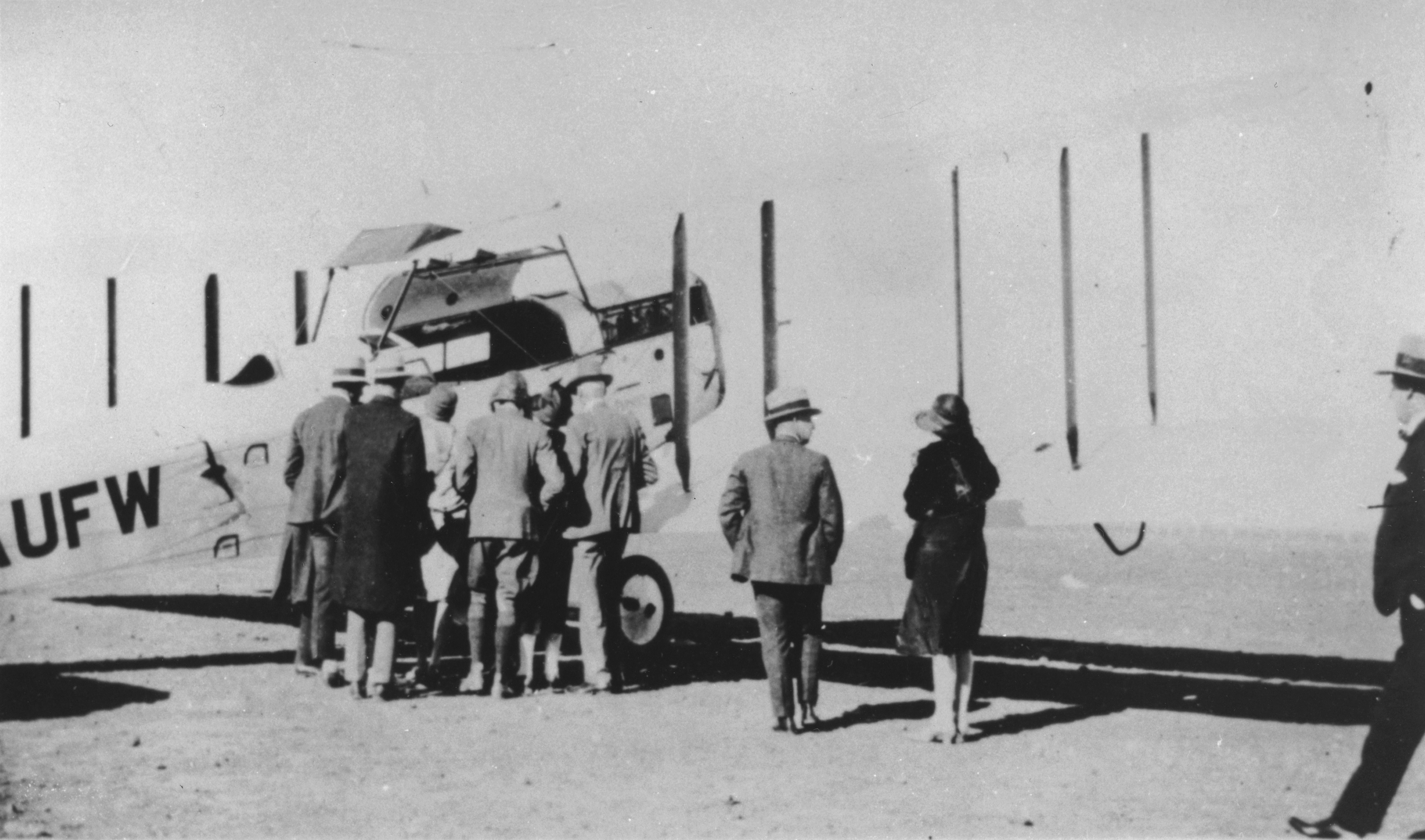
Prime Minister Stanley Melbourne Bruce visiting Winton, 31 October 1924.

Following the upgrade, Qantas began a Charleville-Longreach-Winton-Cloncurry air mail service on 5 October 1922. For this service, an aerodrome was completed at Charleville a month prior. Following an accident involving a lorry driver, Dr. Frederick Archibald Hope Michod made a record 55 minute flight on an Airco DH.4 for Winton Aerodrome. The flight covered 110 air miles, and the doctor performed an operation once arriving at Winton. On 31 October 1924, Prime Minister Stanley Bruce and Ethel Bruce arrived at Winton Aerodrome by a de Havilland DH.50. Two more aircraft followed, carrying Dr F. A. Hope Michod and Colonel Sir Donald Charles Cameron. The event marked the first time an Australian PM would travel by aircraft for election campaigning. Electric lighting was installed at the aerodrome in September 1928, enabling flights to take place after daylight.

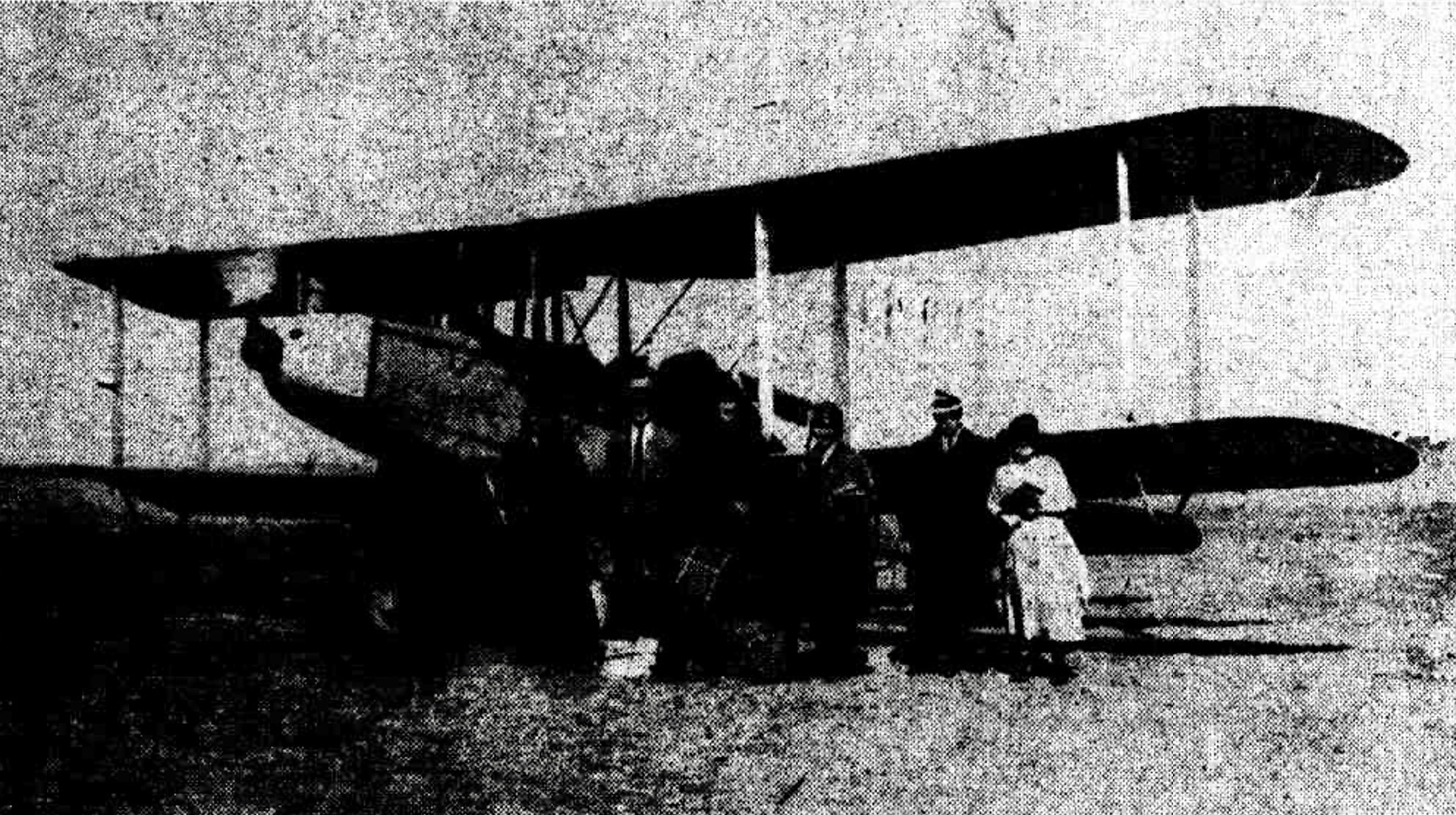
A newly acquired Qantas D.H.50 at Winton Aerodrome with the pilot, three passengers and their luggage, and two agency staff from Winton.

In June 1930, the council attempted to acquire a permit for larger aircraft to operate out of Winton Aerodrome. However, the Civil Aviation Board (CAB) drew attention to the fact that the landing ground was too small, suggesting that it be expanded by acquiring a portion of Government land. Renowned Australian aviator Charles Kingsford Smith flew over the aerodrome on 21 October 1930. A day later, long-distance pioneer F. R. Matthews flew from England and landed at Winton, en route to Sydney. He piloted a de Havilland DH.80A Puss Moth, aiming to break the solo light-plane speed record to Australia. The party was escorted to the nearby North Gregory Hotel for breakfast, and they left for Longreach shortly thereafter. Taking the CAB's recommendation into account, Winton Aerodrome's landing ground was extended in January 1932, superintended by Aerodrome inspector Mr. H. Williams. On 30 March 1932, German aviator Elly Beinhorn landed at Winton Aerodrome from Cloncurry. Her aircraft was accompanied by one from Qantas and another from Golden Shell. From this point, Shell Oil Company would make regular flights from Winton Aerodrome carrying a company inspector for depots in the Northern Territories. In September 1932, the Commonwealth allocated £750 to improvements of the aerodrome, including filling wash-outs from heavy rain and improving surface.

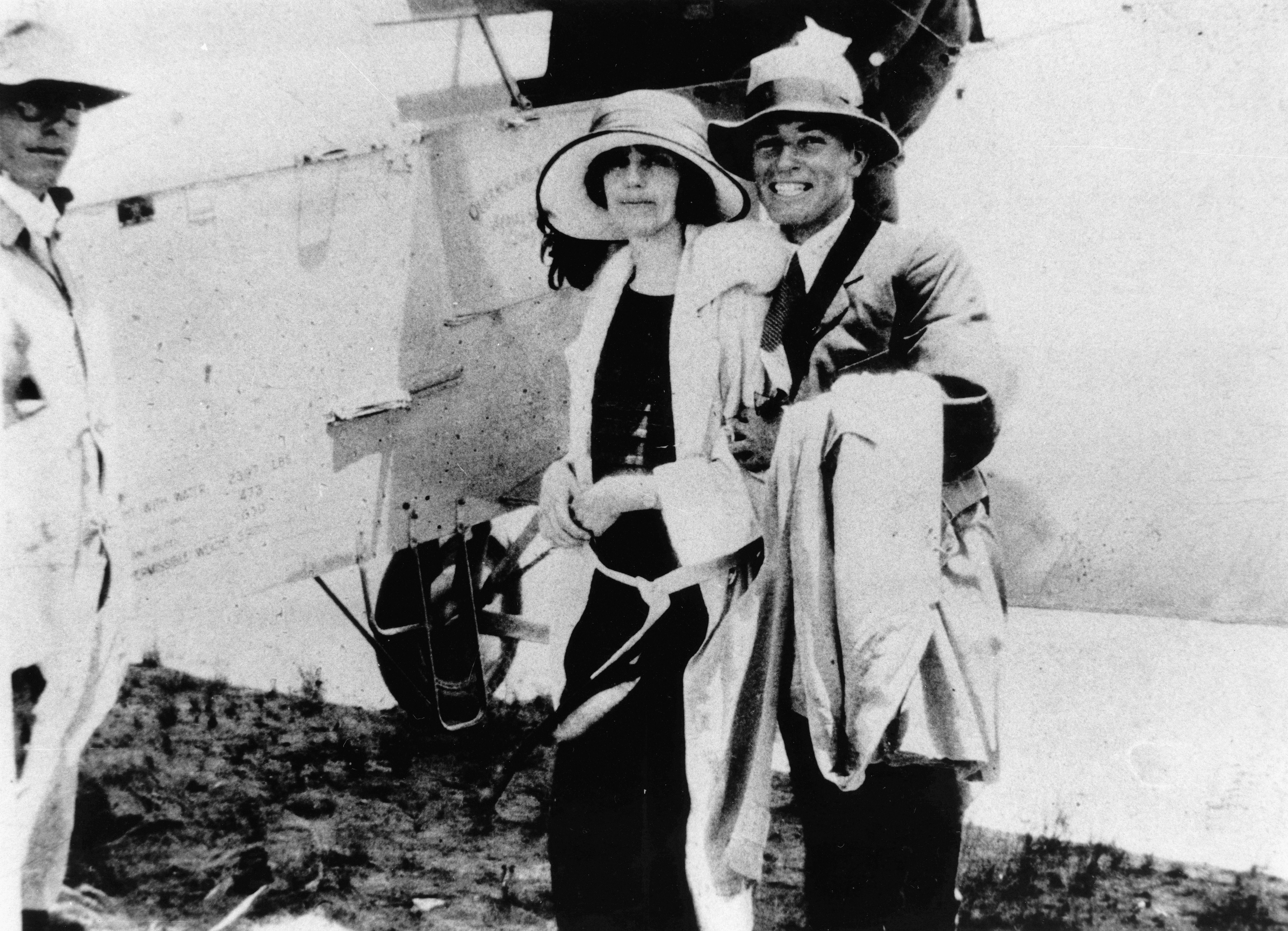
Honeymooners boarding a De Havilland DH.50 plane at Winton, 1920 - 1930.

=== Closure ===
Following an inspection by Hudson Fysh who determined that the aerodrome was unfit for larger aircraft, the council began plans for a new one in July 1934. Construction of the new Winton Aerodrome began in February 1935.

== Airlines and destinations ==
Airlines	Destinations
Qantas	Longreach, Cloncurry
