= Royal Aircraft Factory C.E.1 =

C.E.1

General information
- Type: Patrol flying boat
- National origin: United Kingdom
- Manufacturer: Royal Aircraft Factory
- Designer: William Farren
- Status: Prototype
- Number built: 2

History
- First flight: 17 January 1918

The Royal Aircraft Factory C.E.1 (Coastal Experimental 1) was a prototype British flying boat of the First World War. It was a single-engined pusher configuration biplane intended to carry out coastal patrols to protect shipping against German U-boats, but only two were built, the only flying boats to be designed and built by the Royal Aircraft Factory.

== Design and development ==
In February 1917, Germany restarted unrestricted submarine warfare against Britain, France and their allies, resulting in heavy losses to unescorted merchant shipping. There was a shortage of maritime patrol aircraft as the large Felixstowe F.2 flying boats had not yet entered large scale service, and the Royal Aircraft Factory, despite the fact that most of its aircraft were intended for land service with the Royal Flying Corps, decided to design and build a coastal patrol flying boat, the C.E.1 (Coastal Experimental 1) to help combat the U-boat menace.

Work started on the C.E.1, designed by William Farren, in July 1917, with two prototypes being built. It was a single-engined pusher, of similar layout to the pre-war Sopwith Bat Boat, but considerably larger, with a wooden hull featuring a single step, and the tail surfaces carried on tailbooms above and behind the hull. The aircraft's two-bay biplane wings folded rearwards for storage. The crew of two sat in tandem open cockpits, with a planned armament of up to three Lewis guns on pillar mountings, while bombs could be carried below the lower wings.

The first prototype, powered by a 230 hp (172 kW) RAF 3 V12 engine driving a four-bladed propeller was completed at Farnborough late in 1917, being sent to Hamble near Southampton for final assembly and initial flight testing on 25 December. The C.E.1 made its maiden flight, piloted by its designer, on 17 January 1918. After modifications to its controls it was sent to the Port Victoria Marine Experimental Aircraft Depot on the Isle of Grain for service trials in April, being quickly followed by the second prototype, which was powered by a 260 hp (190 kW) Sunbeam Maori engine. Trials showed that the C.E.1 was inferior to the larger and more powerful twin-engine Felixstowe flying boats, and no production followed, the two prototypes being used for hydrodynamic experiments to validate test data obtained from model tests in a test tank at the National Physical Laboratory.

== Specifications (Second prototype - Maori engine) ==
Data from The Royal Aircraft Factory

General characteristics

- Crew: 2
- Length: 36 ft 3 in (11.05 m)
- Wingspan: 46 ft 0 in (14.02 m)
- Height: 13 ft 4 in (4.06 m)
- Wing area: 609 sq ft (56.6 m^{2})
- Empty weight: 3,342 lb (1,516 kg)
- Gross weight: 5,000 lb (2,268 kg)
- Powerplant: 1 × Sunbeam Maori water-cooled V12 engine, 260 hp (190 kW)

Performance

- Maximum speed: 92 mph (148 km/h, 80 kn) at sea level
- Endurance: 3 hrs 45 min
- Service ceiling: 7,500 ft (2,300 m)

Armament

- Guns: 3× mountings for machine guns
- Bombs: racks for bombs under inner wings

== See also ==
Aircraft of comparable role, configuration, and era

- AD Flying Boat
- Sopwith Bat Boat
