= Airdisco Phi-Phi =

Phi-Phi

General information
- Type: Single seat glider
- National origin: United Kingdom
- Manufacturer: The Aircraft Disposal Co. Ltd.
- Number built: 1

History
- First flight: 1922

The Airdisco Phi-Phi was a single seat monoplane glider, designed specifically for the first British gliding competition held at Itford Hill in 1922, an endurance event. It recorded one competitive flight but crashed on a second attempt.

== Design ==
In August 1922 the Daily Mail newspaper offered a £1,000 prize for the longest duration flight by an unpowered, heavier than air aircraft. The competition was to be organized by the Royal Aero Club, who chose the site (Itford Hill, on the Sussex South Downs near Lewes) and the date (16–21 October). This gave competitors six weeks to design, build and transport their entries. 13 arrived in time and one of these was the Airdisco Phi-Phi, competition number 27.

The Phi-Phi was an all wood parasol monoplane. Its wing section was thick enough to allow for semi-cantilever construction, supported centrally by two pairs of cabane struts and two steeply rising lift struts from the lower fuselage longerons, though there were a pair of drag wires from nose to wing tip. The wing plan was unusual compared with the straight edges of most of its competitors, with a gently curving leading edge, elliptical tips and straight trailing edge. It had the highest aspect ratio (13.6) of all the Itford gliders. The tip-mounted ailerons were horn balanced, again unusual.

The Phi-Phi had a rectangular cross-section fuselage, with sides that curved in at the nose and, more gently, towards the tail. In plan the sides were straight edged, forming an elongated rhomb. A low aspect ratio, rectangular, all-moving tailplane was hinged on the extreme rear fuselage. The fin and rudder formed a tilted, cropped parallelogram with a hinge line above that of the elevator. The cockpit was immediately under the leading edge, well behind the nose. Originally the Phi-Phi had a pair of small main wheels rigidly attached to the lower fuselage directly below the cockpit and aided by a sprung, articulated tailskid. The wheels were replaced at Itford by a pair of skids and then by skids with small wheels attached to them.

== Operational history ==
The Phi-Phi, flown by Rex Stocken, did not fly until Friday 20 October, the penultimate day of the competition. After a few brief trials and some adjustment to the undercarriage, Stocken made a competition flight that lasted 3 min 18 s. Observers noted that whilst the Phi-Phi lifted off easily enough, like other British gliders present it lacked the rudder authority to hold it into the wind. The following afternoon Stocken attempted another flight but crashed. At the end of the competition he was awarded the Col. Bristow Cup.

== Specifications ==
Data from British Gliders and Sailplanes

General characteristics

- Crew: 1
- Length: 21 ft 3 in (6.48 m)
- Wingspan: 45 ft 0 in (13.72 m)
- Wing area: 150.0 sq ft (13.94 m^{2})
- Aspect ratio: 13.5
- Airfoil: Airdisco
