= De Havilland DH.37 =

DH.37
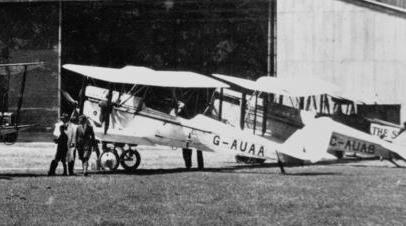

General information
- Type: Private biplane
- Manufacturer: De Havilland
- Number built: 2

History
- First flight: June 1922

The de Havilland DH.37 was a British three-seat sporting biplane of the 1920s designed and built by de Havilland for aviator Alan Samuel Butler.

== Operational history ==
The first example was named Sylvia for the sister of Alan Samuel Butler. It flew extensively for five years before being converted to a single-seater and having its engine upgraded to a 300 hp (220 kW) A.D.C. Nimbus. It crashed in June 1927.

The second aircraft was sold to Australia, and was flown by the Controller of Civil Aviation. Sold to the Guinea Gold Company in New Guinea, it was the first aircraft flown in that country. After a forced landing at Wau aerodrome in December 1937 it was put out of commission.

== Specifications (DH.37) ==
Data from De Havilland Aircraft since 1909

General characteristics

- Crew: One
- Capacity: Two passengers
- Length: 28 ft 0 in (8.53 m)
- Wingspan: 37 ft 0 in (11.28 m)
- Wing area: 398 sq ft (37.0 m^{2})
- Empty weight: 2,118 lb (961 kg)
- Gross weight: 3,318 lb (1,505 kg)
- Powerplant: 1 × Rolls-Royce Falcon III water-cooled V12 engine, 275 hp (205 kW)
- Propellers: 4-bladed wood fixed pitch propeller

Performance

- Maximum speed: 122 mph (196 km/h, 106 kn)
- Service ceiling: 21,000 ft (6,400 m)
- Rate of climb: 1,000 ft/min (5.1 m/s)

== See also ==
- 1922 in aviation
