= Vickers Vendace =

1920s British trainer aircraft

Vendace
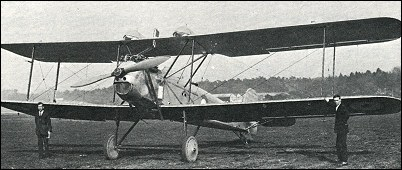

General information
- Type: Trainer
- Manufacturer: Vickers
- Primary user: Bolivia
- Number built: 5

History
- Introduction date: 1928
- First flight: 1926
- Retired: 1933

The Vickers Vendace was a 1920s British trainer aircraft. It was originally designed as a floatplane trainer for the Royal Air Force.

== Background ==
In October 1924, the British Air Ministry issued Specification 5A/24 for a floatplane trainer. To meet this requirement, Vickers designed a two-seat biplane, the Vickers Type 120 Vendace I. In August 1925, the Air Ministry placed an order for a single prototype, in addition to competing aircraft from Parnall and Blackburn, (the Parnall Perch and Blackburn Sprat).

== Design and development ==
The Vendace I was a two-bay biplane with folding wooden wings and a steel tube fuselage, powered by a Rolls-Royce Falcon engine. Its undercarriage could be changed from floats to wheels in ten minutes, while its fuel supply was held in two streamlined tanks above the upper wing.

The first Vendace first flew at Brooklands by March 1926, and then underwent successful trials as a landplane, including operation from the aircraft carrier HMS Furious. In 1927, these were followed by testing in seaplane configuration at the Marine Aircraft Experimental Establishment, Felixstowe. The trials were successful, with the Vendace being selected to meet the RAF's needs. The requirement was soon cancelled as a cost saving measure, although the RAF did retain the aircraft for experimental purposes.

Vickers built a second aircraft, the Type 157 Vendace II, as a private venture, with an ADC Nimbus (an inline six-cylinder engine derived from the Siddeley Puma) that replaced the Falcon of the Vendace I. It first flew in November 1927, and was sold to the Aircraft Operating Company for survey operations in South America.

Development continued with the Type 155 Vendace III powered by a 300 hp (220 kW) Hispano-Suiza 8F, and three were sold to Bolivia for use as trainers, at a cost of £ 9,997 for the three aircraft.

== Operational history ==
In July 1929, the three Bolivian Vendaces entered service with the Escuela Militar de Aviación. While the Vendaces maintained good performance at the high altitude of Bolivia's training airfield at La Paz, they experienced engine problems, blamed on dusty conditions in the Bolivian summer, resulting in the aircraft being grounded several times while waiting for spare parts for the engines to be delivered from France. Two Vendaces were listed as still being in service in 1933, with one being used as a communications aircraft during the Chaco War before being destroyed by Bolivian forces during a retreat in December 1933.

== Variants ==
Type 120 Vendace I
Prototype convertible landplane/seaplane for RAF, powered by 275 hp (205 kW) Rolls-Royce Falcon III engine. One (serial number N208) built.
Type 157 Vendace II
Private venture aircraft powered by 300 hp (220 kW) ADC Nimbus engine. One (registered G-EBPX) built, converted for airborne survey purposes.
Type 155 Vendace III
Trainer for Bolivia, powered by 300 hp (220 kW) Hispano-Suiza 8F engine. Three built.

== Operators ==
Bolivia

- Bolivian Air Force

United Kingdom

- Aircraft Operating Company
- Royal Air Force

== Specifications (Vendace III) ==
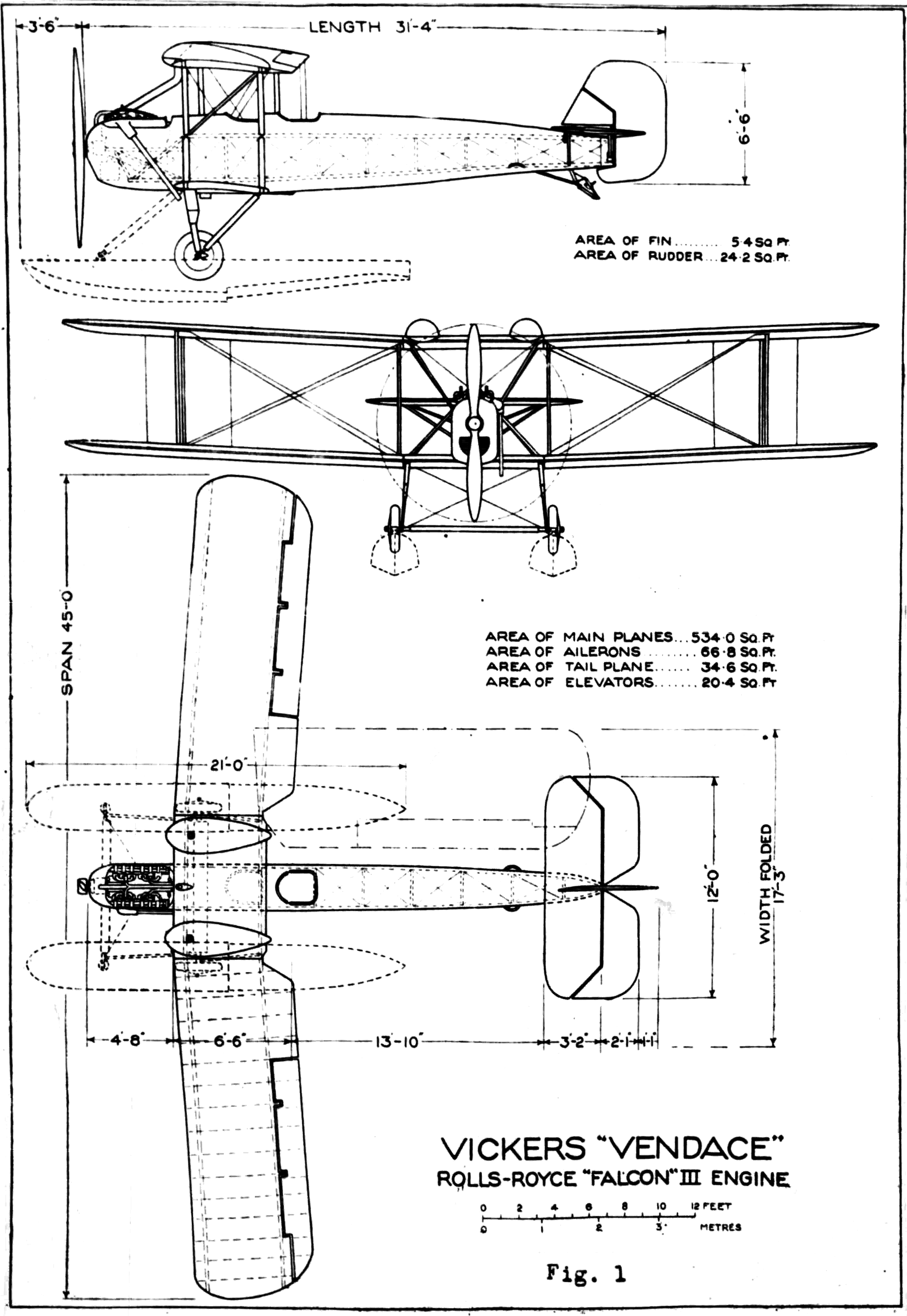
Vickers Vendace I

Data from Vickers Aircraft since 1908

General characteristics

- Crew: 2
- Length: 33 ft 3 in (10.13 m)
- Wingspan: 44 ft 7 in (13.59 m)
- Height: 12 ft 9 in (3.89 m)
- Wing area: 533 sq ft (49.5 m^{2})
- Empty weight: 2,604 lb (1,181 kg)
- Gross weight: 3,207 lb (1,455 kg)
- Powerplant: 1 × Hispano-Suiza 8F V-8 water-cooled piston engine, 300 hp (220 kW)
- Propellers: 2-bladed fixed-pitch propeller

Performance

- Maximum speed: 119 mph (192 km/h, 103 kn) at 19,000 ft (5,791 m)
- Service ceiling: 25,800 ft (7,900 m)
- Rate of climb: 720 ft/min (3.7 m/s)
- Wing loading: 6.02 lb/sq ft (29.4 kg/m^{2})
- Power/mass: 0.094 hp/lb (0.155 kW/kg)

== See also ==
Related lists

- List of aircraft of the Royal Air Force
