= ADC Nimbus =

1920s British piston aircraft engine

Nimbus
- Type: Liquid-cooled inline piston engine
- National origin: United Kingdom
- Manufacturer: Aircraft Disposal Company
- First run: 1926
- Major applications: Airco DH.9; Vickers Vendace
- Developed from: Siddeley Puma

The ADC Nimbus was a British inline aero engine that first ran in 1926. The Nimbus was developed from the Siddeley Puma aero engine by Frank Halford of the Aircraft Disposal Company, the goal was to develop the Puma to produce its intended power output which Halford eventually achieved. The Nimbus was further developed into an air-cooled version known as the ADC Airsix which did not enter production and was not flown.

== Applications ==
- Airco DH.9
- de Havilland DH.37
- de Havilland DH.50
- Nimbus Martinsyde
- Vickers Vendace

== Specifications (Nimbus) ==
Data from Lumsden

=== General characteristics ===
- Type: Six-cylinder, inline, liquid-cooled, upright piston engine
- Bore: 6.0 in (152 mm)
- Stroke: 7.5 in (190 mm)
- Displacement: 1,150.3 cu in (18.85 L)
- Length: 70 in (1,778 mm)
- Width: 17.5 in (444 mm)
- Height: 44 in (1,118 mm)
- Dry weight: 670 lb (304 kg)
- Designer: Frank Halford

=== Components ===
- Valvetrain: 1 inlet and 2 exhaust valve per cylinder
- Fuel system: Carburettor
- Fuel type: 74 octane
- Cooling system: Air-cooled
- Reduction gear: Direct drive, right hand tractor

=== Performance ===
- Power output: 305 hp (227 kW) at 1,450 rpm (takeoff power)
- Specific power: 0.26 hp/cu in (12 kW/L)
- Compression ratio: 5.4:1
- Power-to-weight ratio: 0.46 hp/lb (0.9 kW/kg)

== See also ==
Related development

- Siddeley Puma

Comparable engines

- Benz Bz.III
- Mercedes D.IVa

Related lists

- List of aircraft engines
