= Martinsyde F.1 =

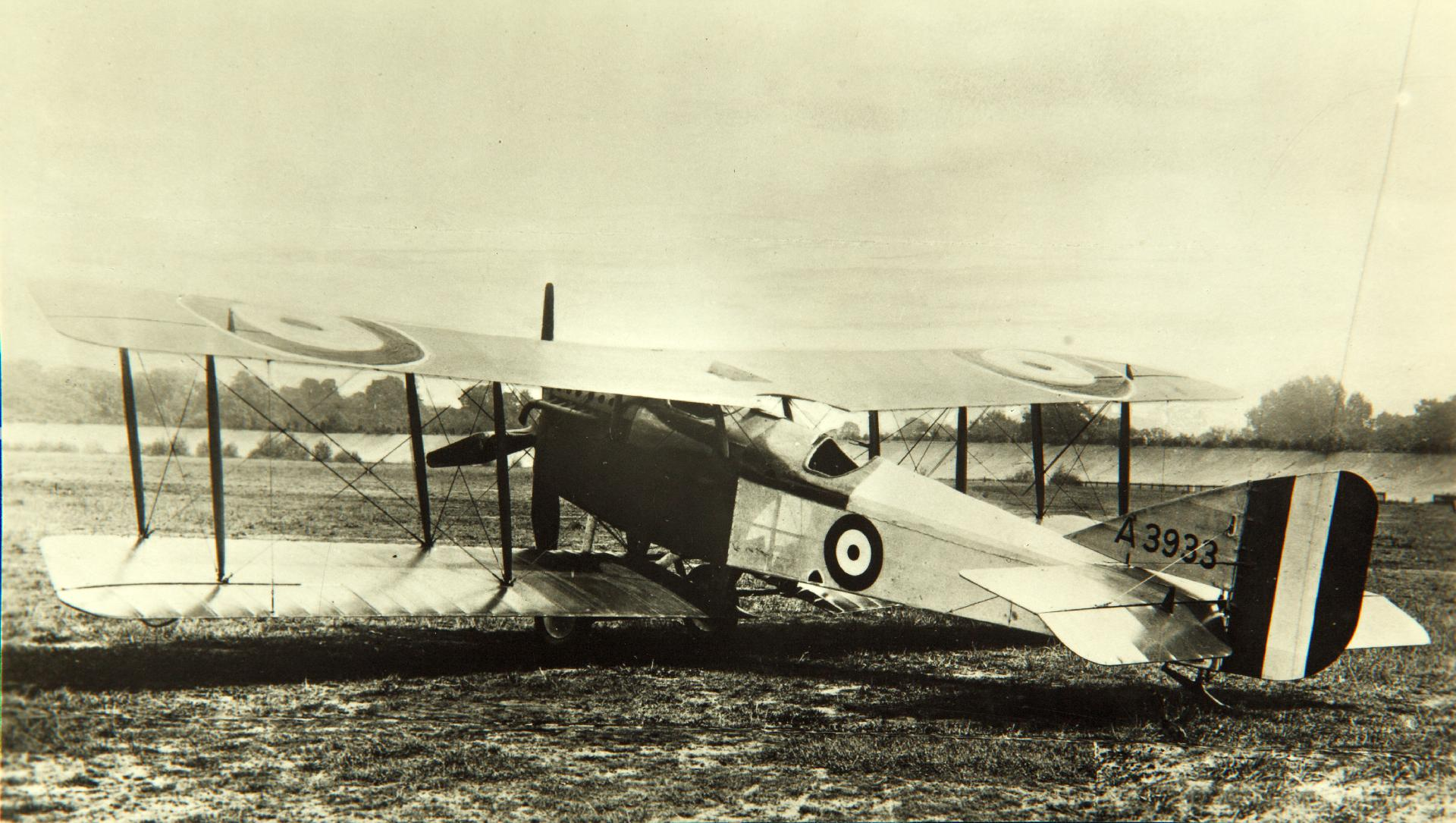

General information
- Type: Biplane fighter aircraft
- National origin: United Kingdom
- Manufacturer: Martinsyde
- Primary user: Royal Flying Corps
- Number built: 2

History
- First flight: 1917

The Martinsyde F.1 was a British two-seat biplane fighter designed and built by Martinsyde Limited, only two prototypes were built.

== Design and development ==
The F.1 was designed as a fighter for the Royal Flying Corps and it was a large tractor biplane powered by a 250 hp (186 kW) Rolls-Royce Mk III piston engine. It had two tandem open cockpits with unusually the observer forward and the pilot behind. A rectangular aperture was cut-out of the upper wing above the observer's cockpit which would allow the observer to use a gun. It was tested at Martlesham Heath in July 1917, where it demonstrated good handling but was criticised for the awkward crew arrangement. It was not ordered into production and only one prototype (of two ordered) was built. It continued in use at Farnborough until after the end of the war.

== Specifications ==
Data from War Planes of the First World War: Volume 1 Fighters

General characteristics

- Crew: 2
- Length: 29 ft 1 in (8.86 m)
- Upper wingspan: 44 ft 6 in (13.56 m)
- Lower wingspan: 44 ft 2 in (13.46 m)
- Height: 8 ft 6 in (2.59 m)
- Wing area: 467 sq ft (43.4 m^{2})
- Empty weight: 2,198 lb (997 kg)
- Gross weight: 3,260 lb (1,479 kg)
- Powerplant: 1 × Rolls-Royce Mk III water-cooled V-12 engine, 250 hp (190 kW)

Performance

- Maximum speed: 109.5 mph (176.2 km/h, 95.2 kn) at 6,500 ft (1,980 m)
- Endurance: 3 hr 45 min
- Service ceiling: 16,500 ft (5,000 m)
- Time to altitude: 13 min 40 s to 10,000 ft (3,050 m)

Armament

- Guns: Possibly 1× Lewis gun operated by observer
