= Martinsyde Buzzard =

1918 British biplane fighter aircraft

F.4 Buzzard
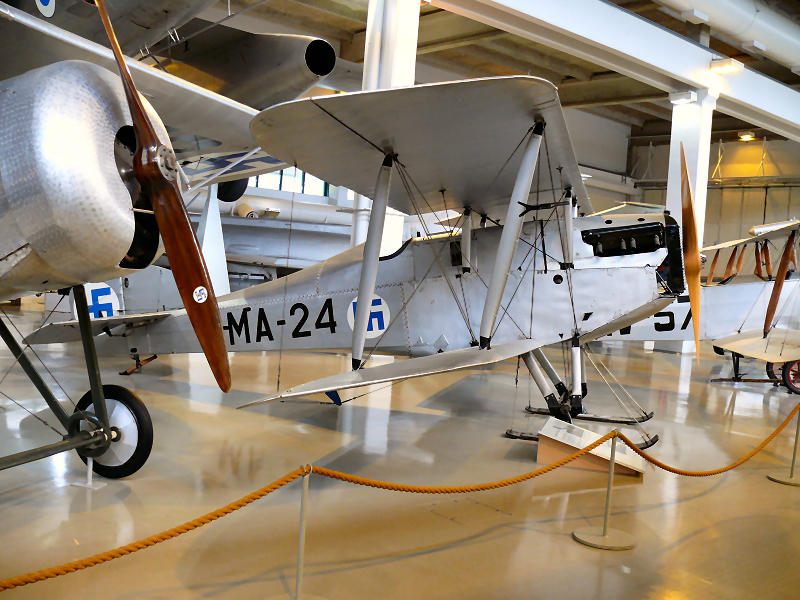
- Martinsyde Buzzard in the Aviation Museum of Finland, 2007

General information
- Type: Biplane fighter
- Manufacturer: Martinsyde
- Designer: George Handasyde
- Primary users: Royal Air Force Soviet Air Force
- Number built: ~370

History
- First flight: June 1918
- Retired: 1940, by Finland

The Martinsyde F.4 Buzzard was developed as a powerful and fast biplane fighter for the Royal Air Force (RAF), but the end of the First World War led to the abandonment of large-scale production. Fewer than 400 were eventually produced, with many exported. Of particular note was the Buzzard's high speed, being one of the fastest aircraft developed during World War I.

== Design and development ==
In 1917, George Handasyde of Martinsyde designed a single-seat biplane fighter powered by a Rolls-Royce Falcon V-12 engine, the Martinsyde F.3, with a single prototype being built as a private venture without an official order, and had flown at Brooklands aerodrome by October 1917. six being ordered in 1917, with the first flying in November that year. Its performance during testing was impressive, demonstrating a maximum speed of 142 mph (229 km/h), and was described in an official report as "a great advance on all existing fighting scouts", resulting in an order for six pre-production aircraft and 150 production fighters being placed late in 1917. It soon became clear, however, that all Falcon production was required to power Bristol F.2 Fighters, so an alternative to the Falcon would be needed.

Martinsyde designed a new fighter based on the F.3, but powered by a 300 hp (220 kW) Hispano-Suiza 8 engine, the F.4 Buzzard. The Buzzard, like the F.3, was a single-bay tractor biplane powered by a water-cooled engine. It had new lower wings compared with the F.3, and the pilot's cockpit was positioned further aft, but otherwise the two aircraft were similar. The prototype F.4 was tested in June 1918, and again demonstrated excellent performance, being easy to fly and maneuverable as well as very fast for the time. Large orders followed, with 1,450 ordered from Martinsyde, Boulton & Paul Ltd, Hooper & Co and the Standard Motor Company. It was planned to supply the French Aéronautique Militaire as well as the British Royal Air Force, and production of a further 1,500 aircraft was planned in the United States of America.

Deliveries to the RAF had just started when the Armistice between the Allies and Germany was signed. Martinsyde was instructed to only complete those aircraft which were part built, while all other orders were cancelled. The Buzzard was not adopted as a fighter by the post war RAF, the cheaper Sopwith Snipe being preferred despite its lower performance.

Martinsyde continued development of the Buzzard, buying back many of the surplus aircraft from the RAF, and producing two-seat tourers and floatplanes. After the bankruptcy of Martinsyde in 1922, these aircraft were obtained by the Aircraft Disposal Company which continued to develop and sell F.4 variants for several years.

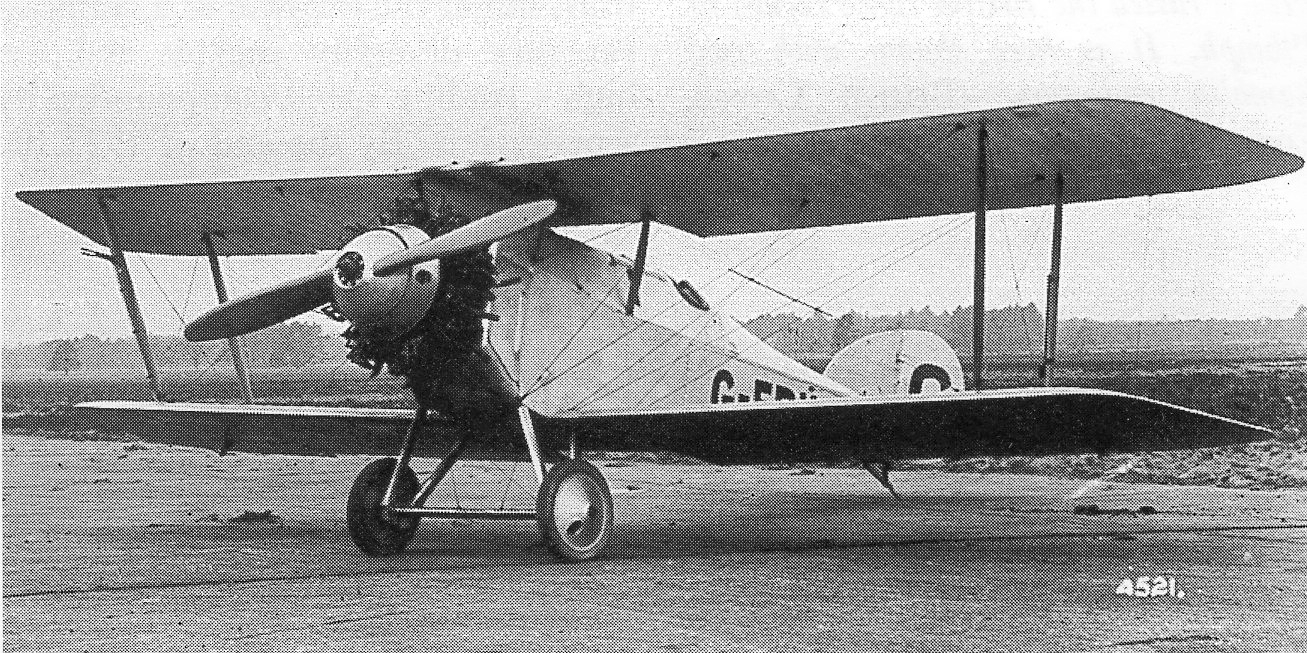
Martinsyde ADC.1 G-EBKL, used for racing from November 1924 until January 1930

== Operational history ==
Despite the limited production, four of the six Martinsyde F.3s ordered were issued to Home Defence squadrons of the RAF in 1918, with two being operated by No. 39 Squadron RAF on 8 July 1918 and one used by 141 Squadron. The RAF received 310 F.4 Buzzards before the end of the First World War, but only 57 would be used. In the immediate post war period, two Buzzards were used as high speed communications aircraft in support of the British delegation at the Paris Peace Conference in 1919, while a few other Buzzards were used at the Central Flying School.

While the postwar RAF was not buying Buzzards, Martinsyde had some success selling them overseas, with both single and two-seat versions being sold to a number of air forces, including those of Spain (20 aircraft), Finland (15 aircraft) and the Soviet Union (41 aircraft). Some of these aircraft had long careers, with six of the Spanish Buzzards remaining in service at the start of the Spanish Civil War. Following the bankruptcy of Martinsyde, the Aircraft Disposal Company sold eight Jaguar engined versions, the ADC.1 to Latvia, one of these remaining in service until 1938.

Other Martinsydes were sold to civil owners for use as tourers, racing aircraft, and in Newfoundland, for survey flights and seal spotting.

== Variants ==
F.3
Single-seat fighter biplane. Powered by Rolls-Royce Falcon. Seven built.
F.4 Buzzard
Single-seat fighter biplane. Powered by 300 hp (220 kW) Hispano-Suiza 8 engine. Main production type.
F.4 Buzzard 1a
Long range escort fighter for Independent Air Force; three built.
F.4A
Surplus F.4 Buzzards converted into two-seat aircraft for touring and military use.
F.6
Surplus F.4 Buzzards converted into two-seat aircraft; revised wing and landing gear.
F.16
Soviet two-seater derived from F.4, 20 built.

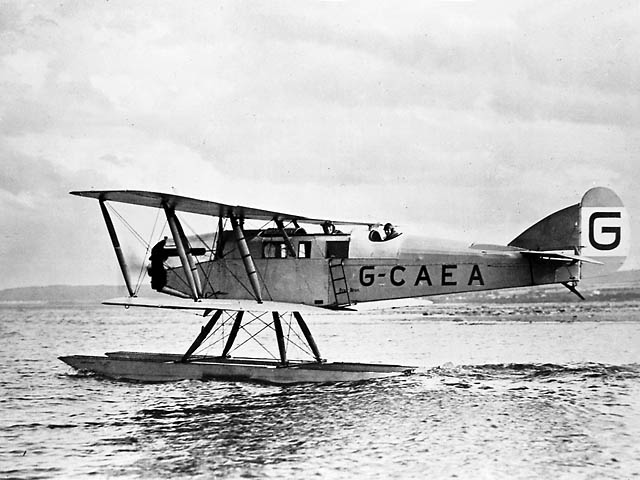
Martinsyde Type A Mk. II

Type A.Mk I
Surplus F.4 Buzzards converted into two-seat long-range aircraft. Larger two-bay wings, powered by Rolls-Royce Falcon engines.
Type AS.Mk I
This version of the Type A.Mk I was fitted with float landing gear.
Type A.Mk II
Four-passenger cabin version of A Mk.I. Powered by Hispano-Suiza or Falcon engine.
A.D.C. 1
Single-seat fighter version, powered by a 395 hp (295 kW) Armstrong Siddeley Jaguar radial piston engine. The aircraft was developed by the Aircraft Disposal Company. One prototype. Eight production aircraft were exported to Latvia.
Nimbus Martinsyde
One aircraft was converted by A.D.C. with a 300 hp (220 kW) ADC Nimbus engine.
A.V. 1
One aircraft built for the engine designer Amherst Villiers, painted two-tone blue and white, and nicknamed the Blueprint.
Raymor
a single A.Mk 1 modified for a transatlantic flight attempt, powered by a 285 hp (213 kW) Rolls-Royce Falcon III.

== Operators ==
Canada

- Royal Canadian Air Force – One F.6 was in service with the RCAF in 1922.

Finland

- Finnish Air Force – received one F.4 in 1923 and 14 in 1927, all ex-RAF machines, and operated them until 1940. The sole surviving example is preserved at the Aviation Museum of Central Finland.

France

- Aeronautique Militaire – One F.4 for evaluation.

Ireland

- Irish Air Service – Operated one A Mk.II (purchased in November 1921 so Michael Collins could escape to Ireland if Anglo-Irish Treaty negotiations broke down), and four ex-RAF F.4 fighters.

Japan

- Imperial Japanese Army Air Service – one F.4 was demonstrated to the Japanese.

Latvia

- Latvian Air Force – operated one F.4 and nine A.D.C.1s.

Lithuania

- Lithuanian Air Force – money raised in the US by Lithuanian emigrants purchased two Buzzards in 1922, named Amerikietis (American man) and Amerikiete (American woman).

Poland

- Polish Air Force – one F.4 used 1923–1926 as personal machine of Air Force Commander Włodzimierz Zagórski, in red and white stripes.

Portugal

- Portuguese Air Force – one F.4 being used for a sales tour was purchased and donated by British expatriates in Portugal, and three additional ex-RAF surplus F.4s were purchased by the Portuguese government.

Spain

- Spanish Republican Air Force – operated a mix of 20 F.3s, F.4s and F.6s.
- Spanish Republican Navy operated 13 aircraft including many transferred from the Air Force.

Soviet Union

- Soviet Air Force – received 41 ex-RAF F.4s from the UK, and produced an additional 60 or so F.4s in Russia, plus 20 two-seat F.16s.

United Kingdom

- Royal Air Force

Uruguay

- Military School of Aeronautics – operated a single F.4.

== Specifications ==
Data from War Planes of the First World War: Volume One Fighters.

General characteristics

- Crew: One
- Length: 25 ft 5.6 in (7.762 m)
- Wingspan: 32 ft 9.4 in (9.992 m)
- Height: 8 ft 10 in (2.69 m)
- Wing area: 320 sq ft (30 m^{2})
- Empty weight: 1,811 lb (821 kg)
- Gross weight: 2,398 lb (1,088 kg)
- Powerplant: 1 × Hispano-Suiza 8Fb inline engine, 300 hp (220 kW)

Performance

- Maximum speed: 146 mph (235 km/h, 127 kn) at sea level 132.5 mph (213.2 km/h) at 15,000 ft (4,600 m)
- Endurance: 2.5 hours
- Service ceiling: 24,000 ft (7,300 m)
- Climb to 10,000 ft (3,000 m): 7 min 55 sec

Armament

- Guns: 2 x 0.303 in (7.7 mm) Vickers machine guns

== See also ==
Aircraft of comparable role, configuration, and era

- Nieuport-Delage NiD 29
- Sopwith Dolphin

Related lists

- List of aircraft of the Spanish Republican Air Force
- List of interwar military aircraft
