= Winton Aerodrome =

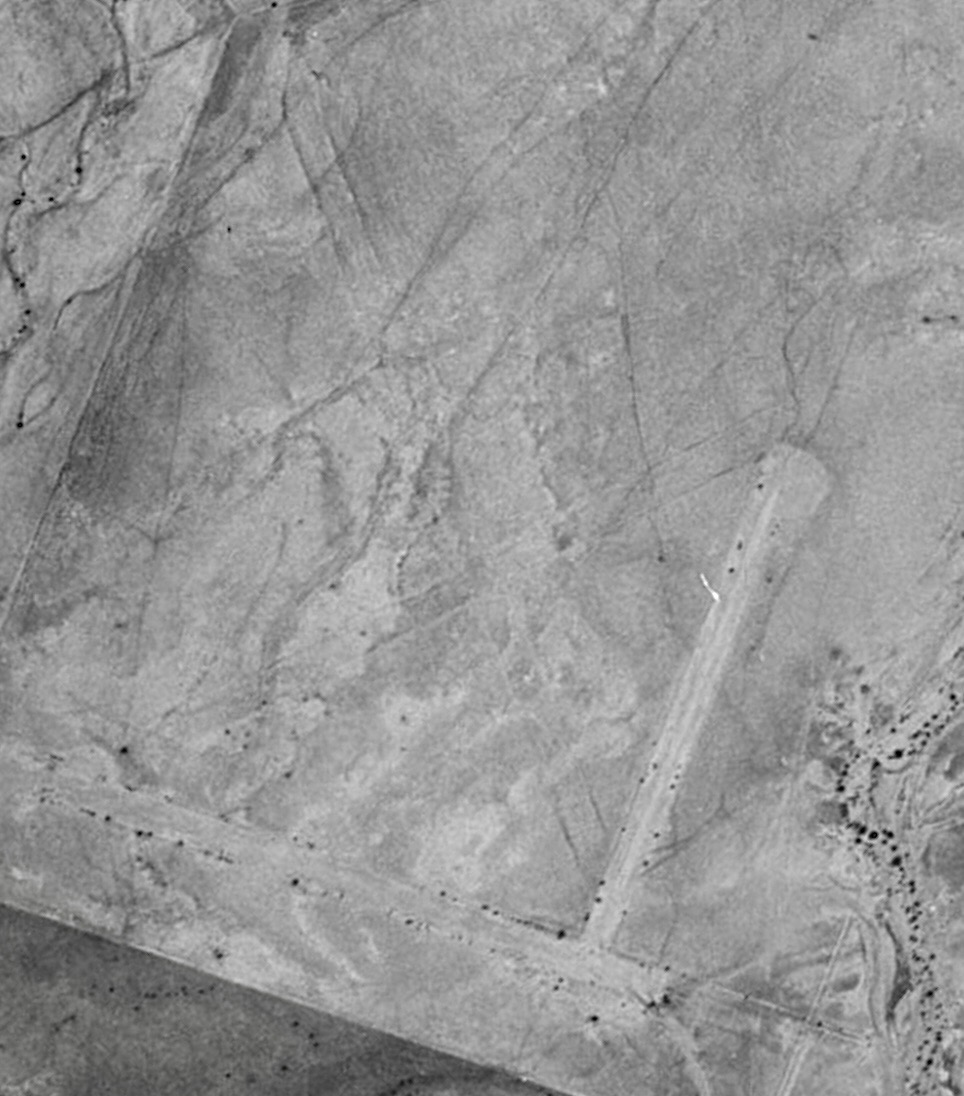
- Aerial photograph of Winton Aerodrome in November 1963.
- IATA: none; ICAO: none

Summary
- Owner: Australian Government
- Operator: Department of Civil Aviation
- Opened: 1935
- Closed: 1942
- Coordinates: 22°22′03.91″S 143°01′37.13″E

Map
- Location in Queensland

Winton Aerodrome was an airfield located 2 kilometres (1.2 mi) northwest of Winton, Queensland in Australia. Established in 1935, the aerodrome had a troubled history of heavy rain, funding, and the presence of a nearby hill that led to its closure in 1942.

== History ==
Winton was primarily served by the earlier Winton Aerodrome, which was deemed too small to cater larger planes offered by Qantas. In December 1934, the Winton Shire Council and Citizen's Committee failed to secure Federal and State funding for construction works of a new aerodrome at Winton. Although, members of the committee approached the Civil Aviation Board (CAB) to reimburse the council for the costs of the installation of a perimeter fence and rolling the landing ground area. The Federal Government was initially under the impression that ownership of the existing aerodrome belonged to the council, thus they could not support their application for funding. However, it was later made clear that the land was held by the DCA.

In September 1935, a proper aerodrome access road began construction, for which an additional sum of £50 was provided. A tractor grader was used to grade a track wherein gravel would be laid on the road. Following the completion of the road in February 1936, costs expended to £463 from the initial £300 state loan and £200 subsidy, as it was built to Main Roads specifications. The CAB would also send a complaint to the council that the new aerodrome was hard to visually locate by pilots. Subsequently, improvised navigation aids were implemented involving painting the fence posts, kerosene tins, and roof shed white.

Throughout August 1936, three to six inches of heavy rain at Winton led to minor flooding of the area and disruptions in service. By then, the landing ground of the aerodrome had been roughened from constant wet weather. Complying with a request made by the CAB, two broad tracks were rolled in the aerodrome during September 1936. As the council was unable to secure funds for a permanent runway, ownership of Winton Aerodrome was transferred to the Federal Government in October 1936. On 16 December 1936, the Winton Shire Council received an approval of the construction of a gravel runway at Winton Aerodrome, and that the work will be facilitated by the Commonwealth Works Department. The construction of two gravel runways with concrete turntables commenced on 19 April 1937, costing £3000. A labour force of 20 men were employed, using a small tractor and a council-owned light grader. On 22 April 1937, the Western Picnic Races was held, hoping to revive the sport of bike riding in Winton. The event would include a bike race from the town to the aerodrome and back, and nomination money was divided between placed riders. By May 1937, the construction of two gravel runways was nearing completion. An additional two future runways was also considered once the runways were opened. The laying of a third runway began in June 1937. Mr. Vines, an inspector of the aerodrome, recommended that proper drainage was included in improvement works on 21 May 1938. As a result, 2 feet deep trenches were dug for the laying of 850 feet of 9-inch drainage pipes.

== Operations ==
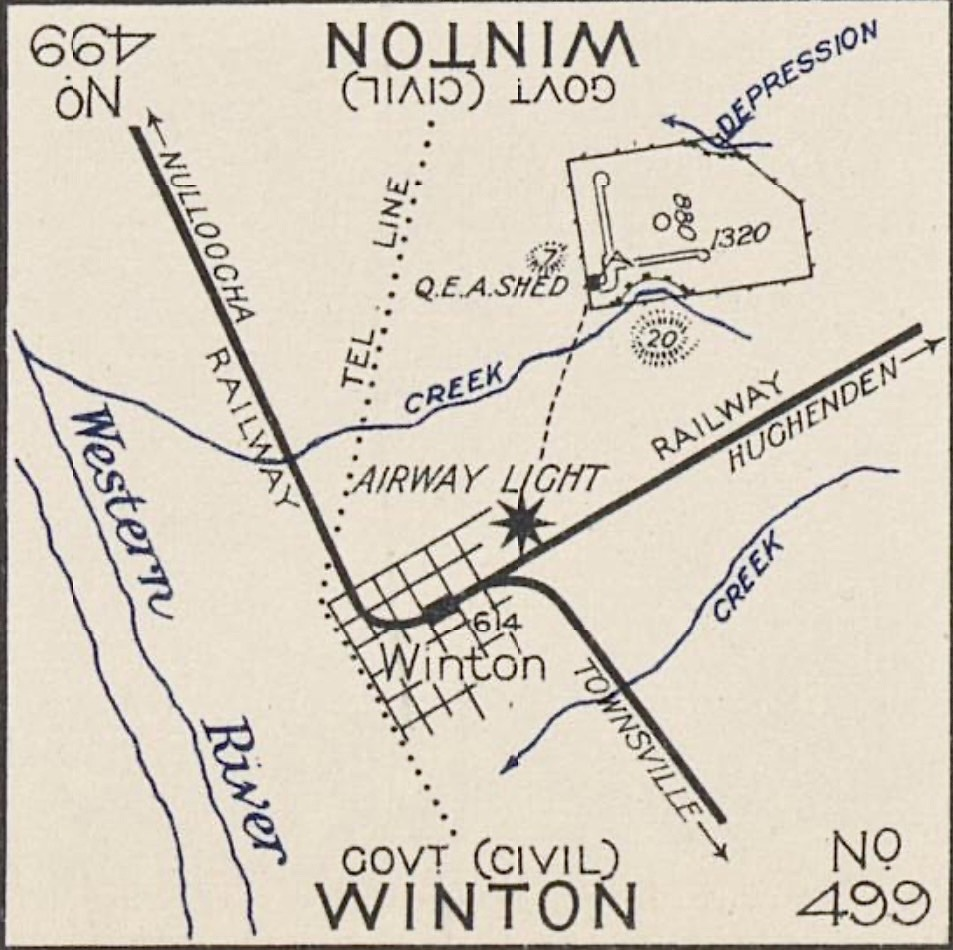
Map of Winton from May 1939 showing the aerodrome and the airway beacon.

By 1939, Winton Aerodrome featured two operational gravel runways, oriented north-south and east-west. It measured 1,400 yards long and 880 yards wide, yielding a total area of 240 acres. There were no obstructions in the 1.2 km of all directions. The aerodrome only featured a small equipment shed owned by Qantas Empire Airways Ltd. Included in a Qantas overseas mail route, a de Havilland DH.86 stopped at Winton Aerodrome four times a week. Night landings could take place as aircraft were guided by flares and an on-site beacon light. However, all mail services exclusively took place during daylight by March 1939, making the provision of night facilities unimportant. Two additional runways were planned, running northwest-southeast and northeast-southwest to enable full all-weather operations.

In March 1940, the Winton Shire Council proposed to the Royal Australian Air Force that Winton Aerodrome be used for the training of cadets.

=== Closure ===
In 1942, the Royal Australian Air Force found that the aerodrome was too small for use by its larger aircraft. Subsequently, it was replaced by the newer, Winton Airport presently located northeast of the town along Longreach Road. After the new airport opened, Winton Aerodrome functioned as a C class, emergency landing ground. In July 1942, the perimeter fencing was removed and its barbed wire was used for fencing at the local rubbish dump. On 28 February 1947, the Department of Civil Aviation announced their abandonment of the old aerodrome during a council meeting. Afterwards, the council purchased any remaining fencing and the land was reverted to the common. On 17 July 1947, the recently formed Mildura and District Motorcycle Club held its first competition at the old Aerodrome.

== Accidents & incidents ==
- On 3 October 1934, a Qantas de Havilland DH.50 registered as VH-UHE was destroyed in a fatal crash while inbound for Winton Aerodrome. The aircraft, named Atalanta, was flying at low altitude in poor weather conditions until it went out of control and crashed. All three occupants were killed.
- On 1 January 1938, a severe dust storm accompanied by powerful gales tore a Qantas de Havilland DH.83 Fox Moth registered as VH-USL from its moorings, which arrived earlier that day for the hospital races. It then rolled and broke apart in the wind. The wreckage was later stored in the town, waiting for instructions from the Qantas head office.
