= Fairey F.2 =

British fighter prototype in the late 1910s

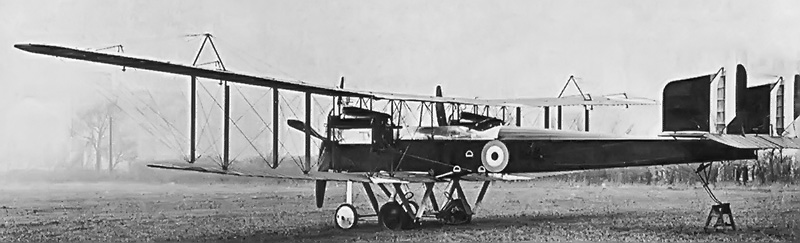

General information
- Type: Fighter
- National origin: United Kingdom
- Manufacturer: Fairey Aviation Company
- Number built: 1

History
- First flight: 17 May 1917

The Fairey F.2 was a British fighter prototype in the late 1910s. It was the first aircraft designed entirely by the Fairey Aviation Company.

== Development ==
The F.2 was ordered by the Admiralty in 1916 as a massive, three-seat long-range fighter. Powered by two Rolls-Royce Falcon engines, it was a three-bay biplane with a four-wheel "bedstead" main undercarriage, the wings folding aft from a point outboard of the engines. Armament consisted of a .303 in (7.7 mm) Lewis Gun on a Scarff ring on the extreme nose and a similar installation immediately aft of the wings.

== Operational history ==
Built at Harlington the F.2 was transported by road to Northolt Aerodrome where it first flew on 17 May 1917; however, by then Admiralty interest in the project had waned. The fighter was found to be hard to handle and slow, and therefore no further production was continued.

== Operators ==
United Kingdom

- Royal Naval Air Service

== Specifications ==
General characteristics

- Crew: three
- Length: 40 ft 6 in (12.34 m)
- Wingspan: 77 ft 0 in (23.47 m)
- Height: 13 ft 6 in (4.11 m)
- Wing area: 814.00 sq ft (75.36 m^{2})
- Gross weight: 4,880 lb (2,213 kg)
- Powerplant: 2 × Rolls-Royce Falcon 12-cylinder water-cooled engines , 190 hp (142 kW) each

Performance

- Maximum speed: 93 mph (150 km/h, 81 kn)
- Endurance: 3 hours 30 minutes

Armament

- 2 × .303 in (7.7 mm) Lewis Guns
