= Sunbeam Sikh =

1920s British piston aircraft engine

Sikh
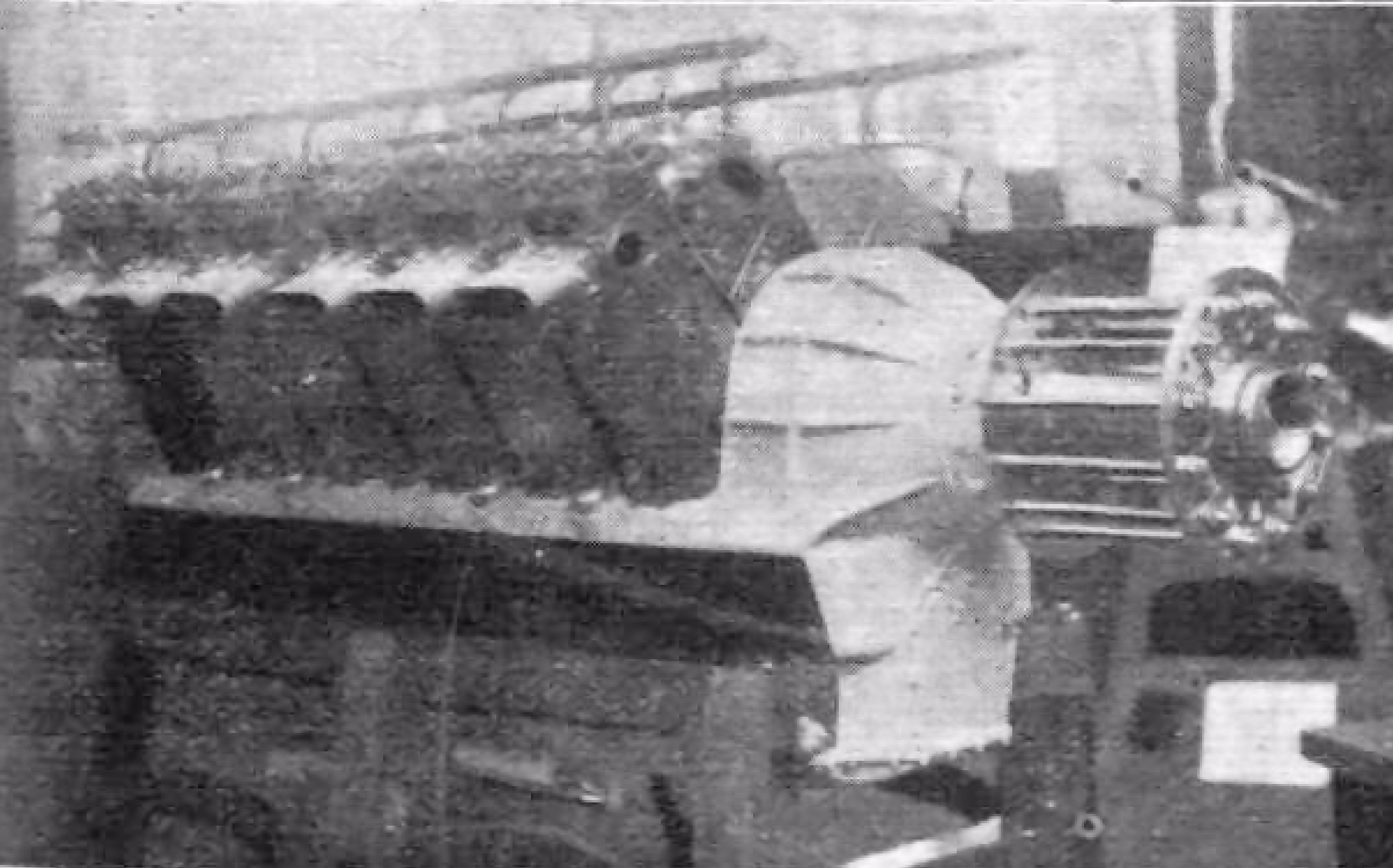
- A Sunbeam Sikh at the 1919 Paris Aero Salon
- Type: V12 water-cooled piston engine
- National origin: Britain
- Manufacturer: Sunbeam
- Designer: Louis Coatalen
- First run: 11 May 1919
- Major applications: Intended for airships
- Number built: Prototypes only

The Sunbeam Sikh was a large slow running V12 piston engine, intended to power airships, under development at the time of the Armistice.

== Design and development ==
At the end of the First World War there was an expectation that Britain would continue the development of airships to provide air travel throughout the British Empire. To power the expected airships Louis Coatalen designed the large Sikh V12 engine delivering 800 hp (600 kW) at only 1,400 rpm, from 64.13 litre (3,913 in^{3}) displacement in a 60-degree V12 configuration, with six valves per cylinder operated by rockers actuated by overhead camshafts.

Bench testing of this impressive engine began in 1919, passing Air Ministry acceptance tests in time for one to be displayed at the 1919 Paris Aero Salon and the 1920 Olympia Aero Show where it generated much interest, due to its size, but no production orders. Competition to power what little airship production there was came from the Rolls-Royce Condor and the Napier Cub. Development work continued till the engine produced 1,000 hp (750 kW) by 1923.

To power smaller airships or Blimps, Coatalen used one cylinder bank to create the Sikh II aka Semi-Sikh, a straight six-cylinder developing 400 to 425 hp (298 to 317 kW) @ 1,400 rpm. As with the Sikh, the market for airship engines dried up after the war, so no production Sikh II engines were built.

In the late 1920s large airships were in favour again, so Coatalen revised the Sikh and developed the Sunbeam Sikh III for the R100 and R101 airship families. Retaining the bore, stroke and displacement of the earlier engine, detail refinements included five valves per cylinder and enclosed valve-gear. The Sikh III was displayed at the 1929 Olympia Aero Show, generating interest due to its large size, weight and power. After the R101 disaster the large Empire airships were abandoned, and the airship market for Sunbeam engines disappeared for a second time, leaving the Sikh III with no orders.

No Sikh engines of any version were sold.

== Variants ==
Sikh
The original 800 hp airship engine intended for use by airships to be developed after the war, which were cancelled.
Sikh II
Following his previous practise Coatalen developed a straight six version of the Sikh, using a single bank of cylinders. Also intended for airships to be developed after the war, the Sikh II was cancelled when the airships did not materialise.(32.1L / 1,957 in^{3})
Semi-Sikh
Alternative name for the Sikh II.
Sikh III
In the late 1920s, renewed interest in airships, which spawned the Empire Airship programme, also encouraged development of engines to power the airships with. The Sikh III was one of these; closely following the Sikh in construction, major differences included two inlet valves instead of three and enclosed valve-gear.

== Specification (Sikh III) ==
Data from Sunbeam Aero-Engines

=== General characteristics ===
- Type: V12 60-degree water-cooled piston engine
- Bore: 180 mm (7.1 in)
- Stroke: 210 mm (8.3 in)
- Displacement: 64.13 L (3,913 cu in)
- Length: 2,185 mm (7 ft 2.0 in)
- Width: 1,018 mm (3 ft 4.1 in)
- Height: 1,652 mm (5 ft 5.0 in)
- Dry weight: 1,252 kg (2,760 lb)

=== Components ===
- Valvetrain: overhead valve two inlet and three exhaust valves per cylinder
- Fuel system: 2x six-cylinder carburettors
- Oil system: Dry sump, pressure feed
- Cooling system: Water-cooling through radiators
- Reduction gear: Spur gear 38:67
- 2x magneto

=== Performance ===
- Power output: 746 kW (1,000 hp) @ 1,650 rpm
- Compression ratio: 5:1

== Bibliography ==
- Brew, Alec. Sunbeam Aero-Engines. Airlife Publishing. Shrewsbury. ISBN 1-84037-023-8
