= Blackburn Sprat =

Sprat
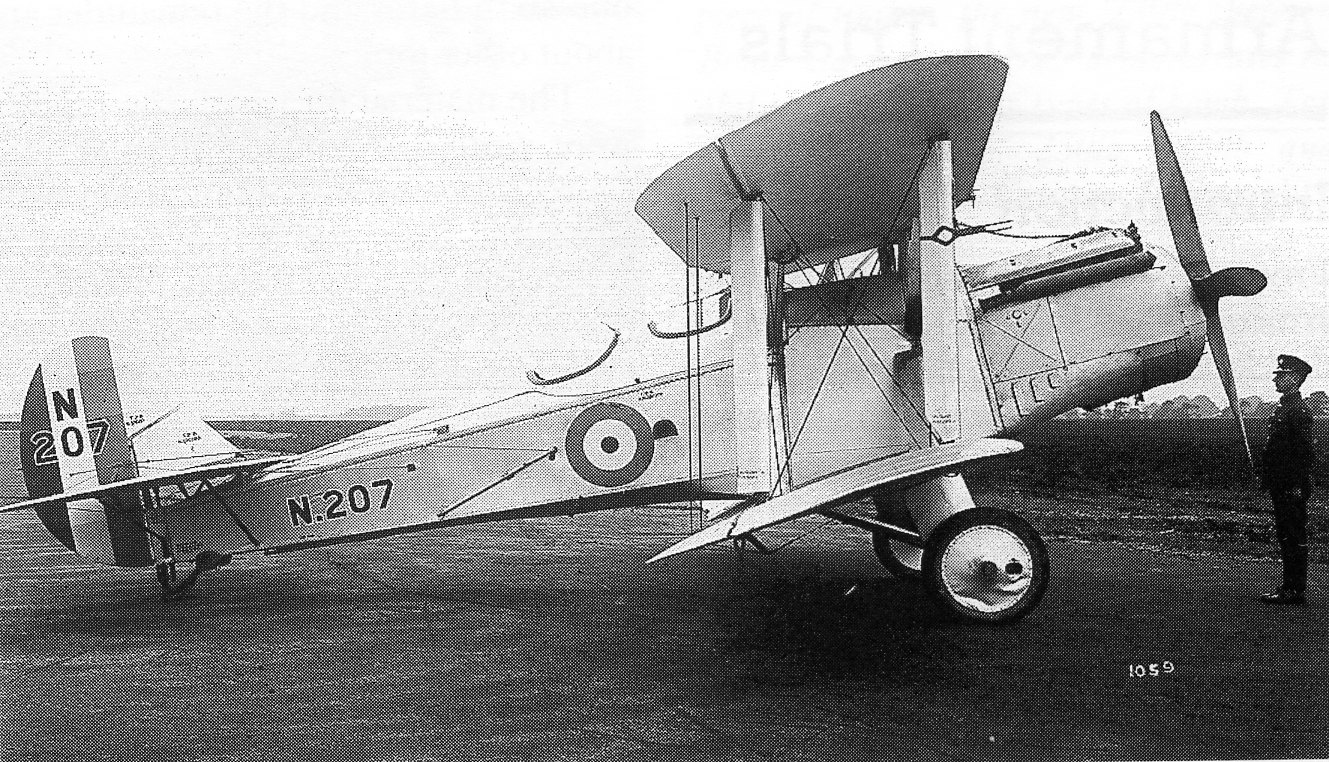

General information
- Type: advanced trainer
- National origin: United Kingdom
- Manufacturer: Blackburn Aeroplane and Motor Co. Ltd
- Designer: F.A Bumpas
- Number built: 1

History
- First flight: 24 April 1926

The Blackburn T.R.1 Sprat was a British single-engine two-seat biplane trainer, built in 1926 for advanced training, deck-landing and seaplane experience. Just one was built.

== Development ==
The Sprat was designed to Air Ministry Specification 5/24 as an RAF advanced trainer and Fleet Air Arm deck-landing trainer. It was specified that the aircraft should be readily convertible to a seaplane, again to be used as a trainer. The specification produced contracts for three machines, the Vickers Vendace, the Parnall Perch and the Sprat.

The Sprat, though a smaller aircraft, had strong family resemblances to the earlier Velos torpedo bomber. The Sprat was a staggered, single-bay biplane with equal-span wings that could be folded for carrier stowage. The fuselage centre section was built around a tubular-steel structure which linked the engine mounting and the wooded-framed rear fuselage. The two dual-control open cockpits were both behind the trailing edge of the wing for optimum visibility. Unusually, the instruments were placed on the rear spar of the upper wing centre section, where they could be read from both cockpits. The rudder area was large compared to that of the fin, and a braced tailplane was placed on top of the rear fuselage.

The main undercarriage was a robust split-axle construction, with the legs joining the wings at the bottom of the X-form centre-section struts. Braced stub axles carried the arrester claws required by the longitudinal arrester wires of Royal Navy aircraft carriers up to 1926. The undercarriage assembly was designed so that it could be easily removed with the aircraft on trestles, and replaced with a pair of aluminium single-step, V-bottomed round-topped floats. These carried water rudders for manoeuvring afloat.

The Sprat was powered by a water-cooled 275 hp (210 kW) Rolls-Royce Falcon III engine with a nose radiator, driving a four-bladed wooden propeller. As on the Velos, the upper engine cowling dropped smoothly away from the upper wing leading edge.

== Operational history ==
The Sprat first flew at Blackburn's works at Brough Aerodrome, then went to Martlesham Heath for comparative trials with the other two contenders. In the end, though the Vendace was selected as the best aircraft for the specification, no orders were placed with any manufacturer because of economy cuts. The Sprat last appeared in public at the Hendon RAF display in July 1926.

== Specifications (landplane) ==
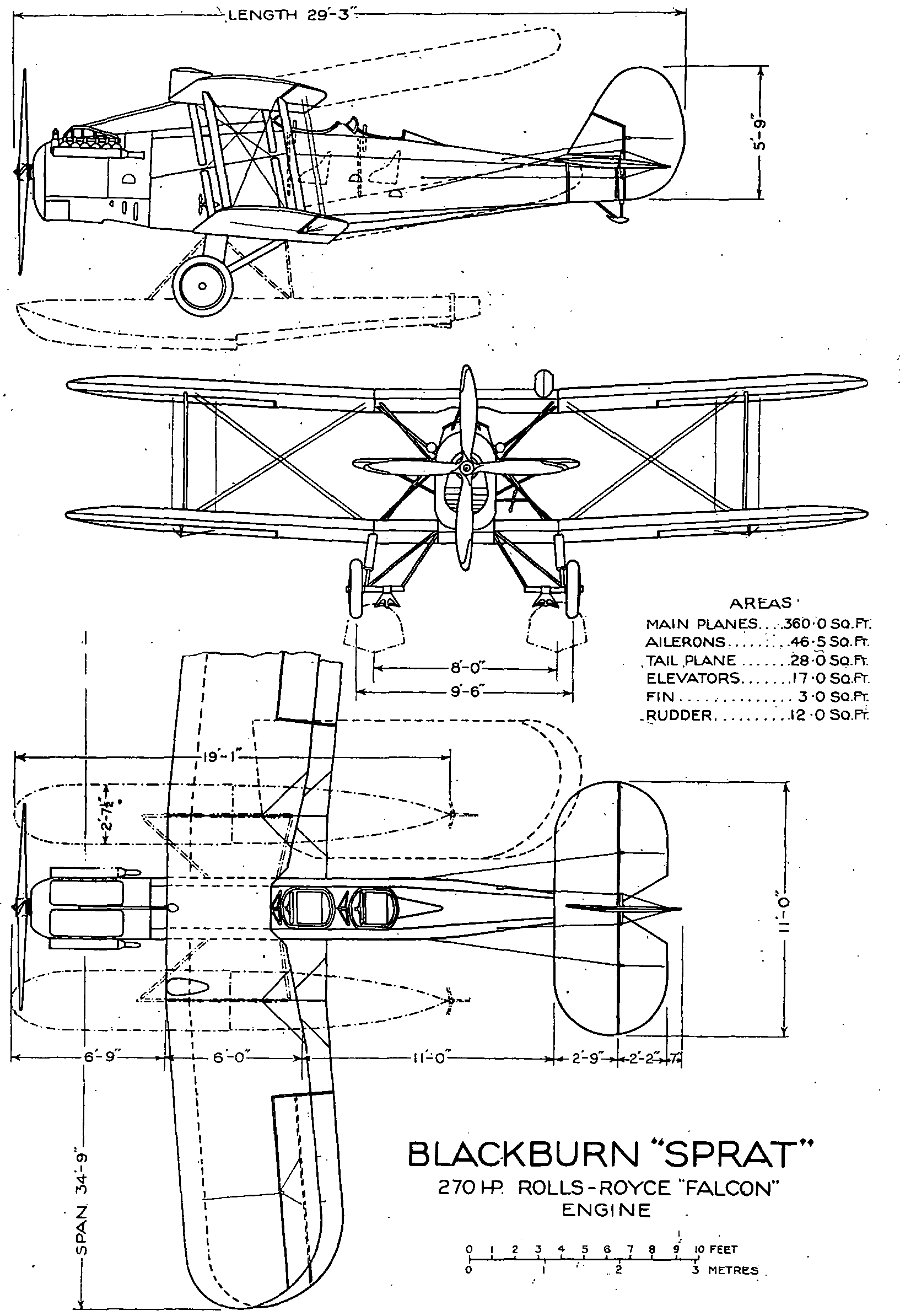
Blackburn Sprat 3 view drawing from NACA Aircraft Circular No.11

Data from Jackson 1968, p. 236

General characteristics

- Crew: two
- Length: 29 ft 3 in (8.92 m)
- Wingspan: 34 ft 9 in (10.59 m)
- Height: 11 ft 0 in (3.35 m)
- Wing area: 406.5 sq ft (37.77 m^{2})
- Empty weight: 2,318 lb (1,051 kg)
- Gross weight: 3,220 lb (1,461 kg)
- Powerplant: 1 × water-cooled V-12 Rolls-Royce Falcon III , 275 hp (210 kW)

Performance

- Maximum speed: 115 mph (185 km/h, 100 kn) at sea level
- Service ceiling: 17,500 ft (5,335 m)
- Rate of climb: 1,100 ft/min (5.60 m/s) (initial)
