= ADC Aircraft =

British firm that sold surplus aircraft after World War I

Aircraft Disposal Company (Airdisco) ADC Aircraft
- Industry: Aviation
- Founded: 1920
- Defunct: 1930
- Fate: Wound up
- Key people: Frederick Handley Page, Frank Halford

The Aircraft Disposal Company (ADC), or Airdisco, was a British firm established in March 1920 to take advantage of the large number of World War I-surplus military aircraft on the market. The company changed name in 1925 to ADC Aircraft Limited.

== History ==
In 1920 the British government, through the Disposal and Liquidation Commission of the Ministry of Munitions, sold the entire stock of surplus aircraft, aero-engines and related equipment held in the United Kingdom to the Imperial and Foreign Corporation Limited. The sale included more than 10,000 aircraft and 35,000 aero-engines, for the sum of £1,000,000 plus a 50% share of any profits. The Imperial and Foreign Corporation formed the Aircraft Disposal Company to sell the equipment and to take over the management of the storage organisation and the large aircraft depots throughout the country. The Handley Page Company were appointed sole managing and selling agents for ADC although problems with the financial arrangement soon put Handley Page at risk and the agreement was made in March 1921 between Handley Page Limited, Frederick Handley Page and ADC to stop ADC liquidating the Handley Page Company.

The former military aircraft were converted to various civil roles before being sold on while others were sold to military buyers. By 1925, it had sold 2,000 airframes and 3,000 engines, generating profits of over £2,500,000, of which half was returned to the British Treasury.

The company had several sites across Britain including 11 acres (45,000 m^{2}) of Regent's Park in London known as Marylebone Green. Three of the National Aircraft Factories became part of the Aircraft Disposal Company including Aintree in Liverpool, Waddon in Croydon, and at Stockport near Manchester.

The company became known as "Airdisco" from its telegraphic address, "Airdisco, London".

In 1926 eight A.D.C.1 fighters (developed from the Martinsyde Buzzard) were delivered to Latvia.

The company had offices at Regent House, 89 Kingsway London WC2.

The company name was changed to ADC Aircraft Limited in 1925 and was finally wound up in 1930.

== Aircraft ==
- Airdisco Phi-Phi
- A.D.C.1 (Martinsyde Buzzard)

== Aircraft engines ==
The company produced a small range of aircraft engines under the direction of Frank Halford, the 'Cirrus' line continued to be manufactured by Cirrus Aero Engines Ltd and their successors.

- ADC Airdisco
- ADC Cirrus
- ADC Nimbus
- ADC Airsix

== See also ==
Related lists

- List of aircraft engine manufacturers
