= Siddeley Puma =

WW1 era inline-6 aircraft engine

Puma
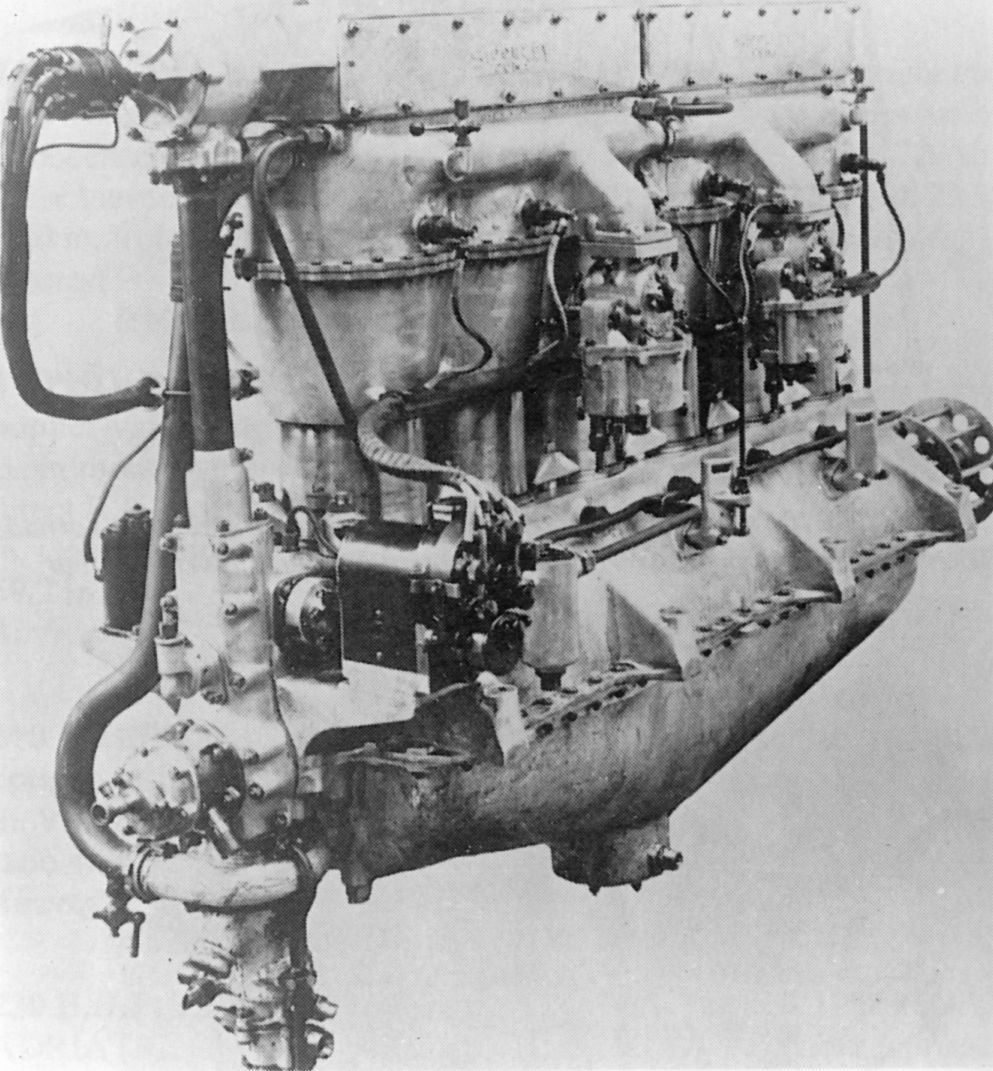
- Siddeley Puma
- Type: Inline engine
- National origin: United Kingdom
- Manufacturer: Siddeley-Deasy
- First run: 1917
- Major applications: Airco D.H.9
- Number built: 4,288
- Developed into: ADC Nimbus; Siddeley Pacific; Siddeley Tiger

The Siddeley Puma is a British aero engine developed towards the end of World War I and produced by Siddeley-Deasy. The first Puma engines left the production lines of Siddeley-Deasy in Coventry in August 1917, production continued until December 1918. In operational service, the engine was unreliable and failed to deliver its rated power. At least 4,288 of the 11,500 ordered engines were delivered, orders were cancelled following the Armistice. Production was continued under the name Armstrong Siddeley Puma when the manufacturer was bought by Armstrong Whitworth and became Armstrong Siddeley.

== Background ==
The Puma was based on an engine designed by Beardmore Halford Pullinger (BHP) which was selected for production on the recommendation of the Internal Combustion Engine Sub-Committee of the Advisory Committee for Aeronautics in March 1917, despite the engine being still under test. Although BHP's design was projected to produce 300 hp (224 kW) the engine's output came in below expectations. The original name given to the engine was the 200 hp BHP. The engine's name was later changed to the 230 hp BHP to better reflect its actual output. BHP formed Galloway Engineering to produce the engine which, when produced by Galloway, became known as the Galloway Adriatic.

The 230 hp BHP engine was also licensed to Siddeley-Deasy, to be built at their Parkside works. In addition to building the Adriatic engines, Galloway also supplied components to Siddeley-Deasy. John Siddeley himself worked on the engine and, after making many changes, the various iterations of the engine built by Siddeley-Deasy all became known as the Siddeley Puma. The Puma was later developed into the ADC Nimbus.

In wartime British military service, versions of the engine built by Siddeley-Deasy and Galloway were both known as the 230 hp BHP although they had different dimensions and few interchangeable parts. The Siddeley-Deasy version of the engine was by far the more numerous of the two designs and the only one in service in continental Europe at the end of WW1.

== Design and development ==
The BHP engine was one of a number of engines with cast aluminium engine blocks that William Weir, 1st Viscount Weir, newly appointed as Controller of Aeronautical Supplies and a member of the Air Board, hoped would be easier to mass produce than the Rolls-Royce Eagle and Falcon, engines that only highly skilled workers could build.

Cylinders are constructed in blocks of three. Steel sleeves, open at both ends, are screwed into an aluminium casting which forms the heads for three cylinders and the inlet manifold. A separate aluminium water jacket surrounds the cylinder barrels and is bolted to the head casting and made tight at the bottom by annular nuts screwed against rubber glands. The bronze valve seats were expanded into place.

Each cylinder contains one large inlet valve and two smaller exhaust valves. This unusual three valve per cylinder design was common to both the Adriatic and Puma engines.

The crankshaft is carried in seven plain bearings. Pistons are made from aluminium and fitted with four rings, the lower top ring and the one below the wrist pin being used as oil scrapers. Dual ignition is supplied by two magnetos mounted crosswise and driven from the camshaft.

The connecting rods have "H" sections and four-bolt caps. Rods were stamped with part numbers and inspection marks that created weak points leading to crack propagation which likely contributed to the type's poor service reliability.

The Puma engine was primarily used in the British World War I bomber aircraft, the Airco D.H.9. In use it proved to be highly troublesome, making the aircraft significantly inferior to the type it replaced. The engine was also installed untidily, with the cylinder heads protruding. The D.H.9, as a type, was improved by replacing the Puma engine with the Liberty 12 to make the D.H.9A. The unit was also used in the prototypes of the Airco DH.10 Amiens in a twin-engined pusher configuration but as performance was unsatisfactory, alternative engines were used in a subsequent prototype of the type and production models.

== Applications ==
- Airco DH.4
- Airco DH.9
- Airco DH.10 Amiens
- Avro 539
- Avro 547
- Bristol Badger
- Bristol F.2 Fighter
- Bristol Seely
- De Havilland DH.50
- Fokker F.II
- Fokker F.III
- Handley Page Type W
- Henderson H.S.F.1
- Lasco Lascoter
- Royal Aircraft Factory F.E.2
- Short Sporting Type
- Short Silver Streak
- Supermarine Channel
- Supermarine Sea King

== Surviving engines ==
A Siddeley build 200 hp BHP engine has been restored to airworthy condition by Retrotec, an aircraft restoration company based in Sussex, United Kingdom. The engine was supplied by the Canada Aviation and Space Museum. After a complete overhaul, and some safety related modifications, the engine was used to power the company's restored Airco DH.9.

== Engines on display ==
Preserved examples of the Siddeley Puma are on display at the following museums:

- National Military Museum, Romania
- Science Museum, London

== Specifications (Puma) ==
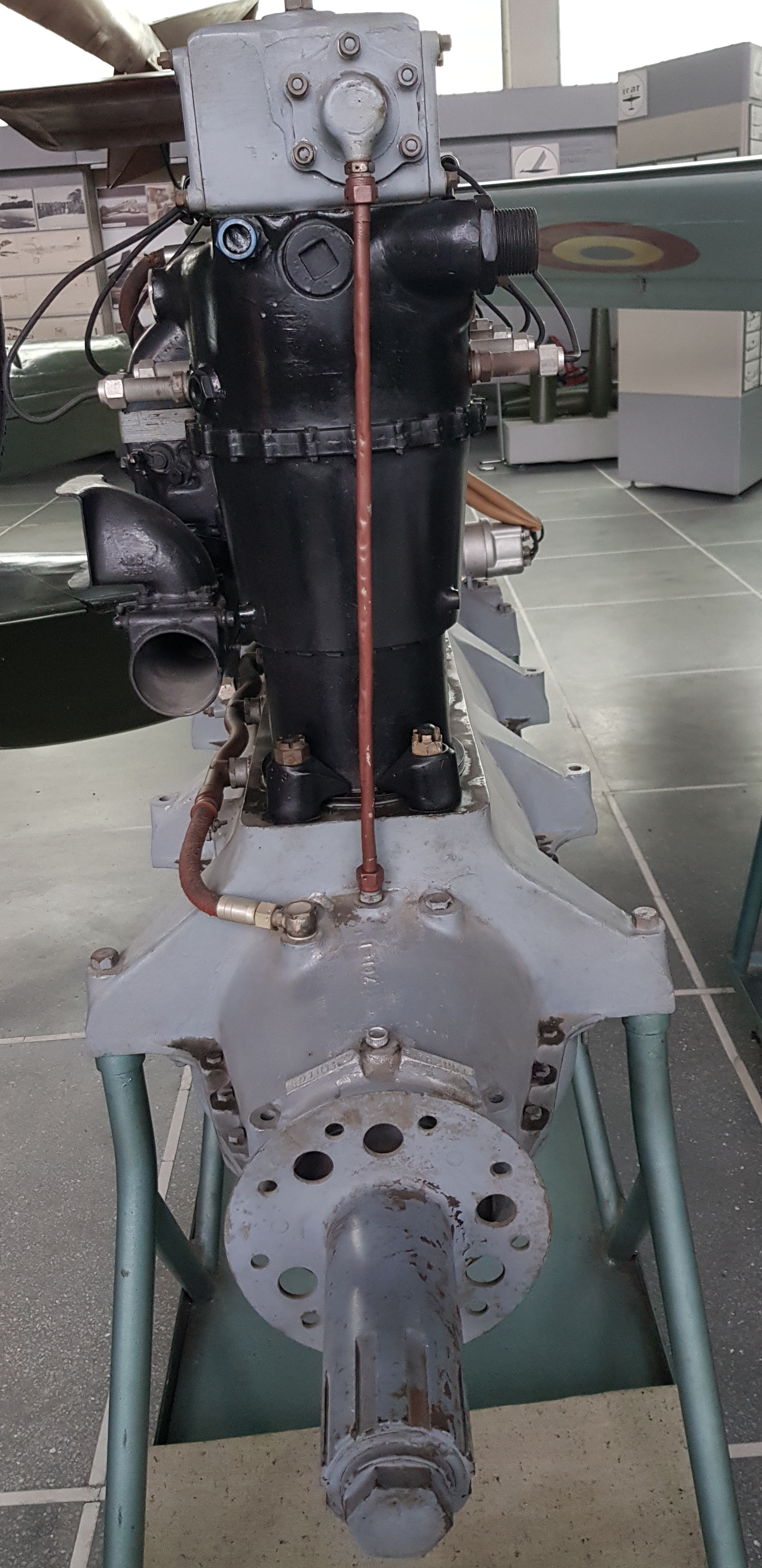
Siddley Puma in National Military Museum, Romania.

Data from Lumsden

=== General characteristics ===
- Type: 6-cylinder water-cooled inline aircraft piston engine
- Bore: 5.71 in (145 mm)
- Stroke: 7.48 in (190 mm)
- Displacement: 1,149 in³ (18.832 L)
- Length: 69.9 in (1,175 mm)
- Width: 24 in (610 mm)
- Height: 43.6 in (1,107 mm)
- Dry weight: 645 lb (293 kg)

=== Components ===
- Valvetrain: One intake + two exhaust valves per cylinder
- Fuel system: Carburettor
- Cooling system: Water-cooled

=== Performance ===
- Power output: *250 hp (186 kW) at 1,400 rpm for takeoff
- 265 hp (198 kW) at 1,500 rpm for short-term maximum power
- Specific power: 0.23 hp/in³ (10.5 kW/L)
- Fuel consumption: * 14 US gal/h (54 L/h) at cruise
- 67 US gal/h (258 L/h) at short-term maximum power
- Power-to-weight ratio: 0.41 hp/lb (0.67 kW/kg)

== See also ==
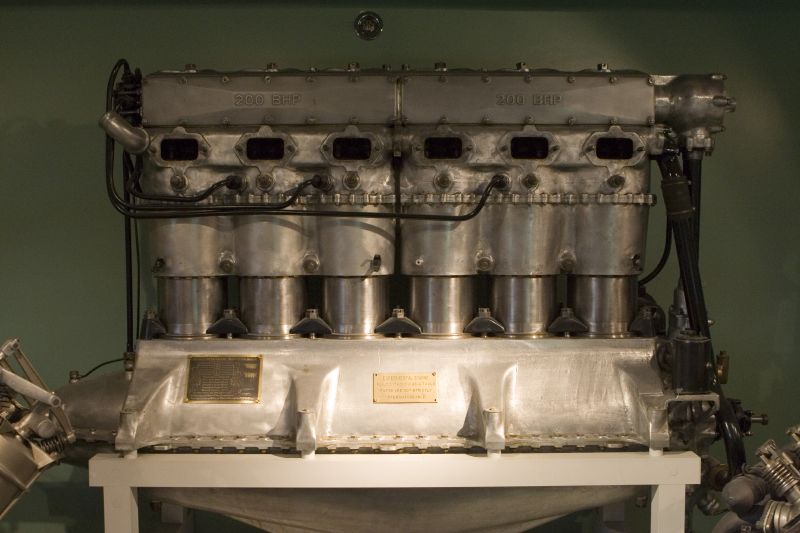
Siddeley-Deasy Puma at the Canada Aviation Museum

Related development

- ADC Nimbus
- Galloway Adriatic

Comparable engines

- Austro-Daimler 6
- Benz Bz.III
- Hiero 6
- Mercedes D.IVa

Related lists

- List of aircraft engines
