= Avro 547 =

547
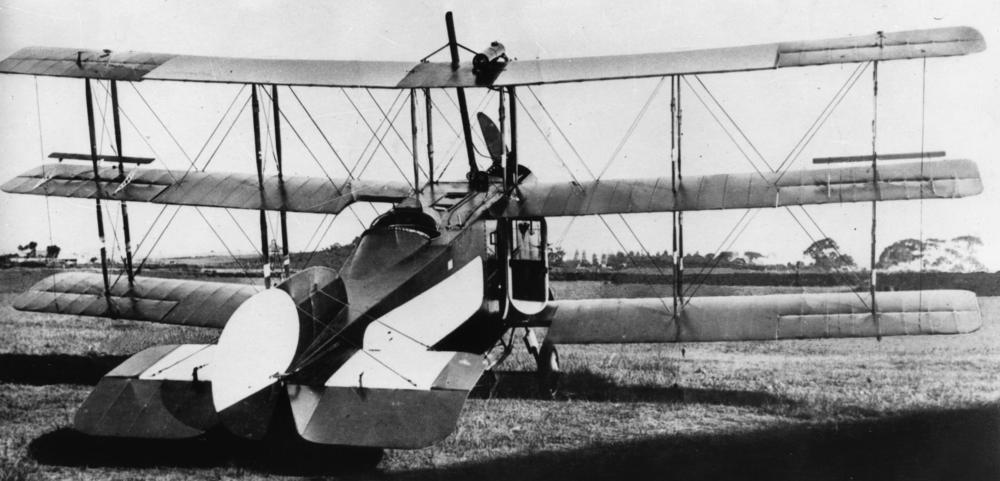

General information
- Type: Airliner
- Manufacturer: Avro
- Primary user: QANTAS
- Number built: 2

History
- First flight: February 1920

The Avro 547 was a prototype triplane airliner developed in Britain after the First World War. It utilised components from the highly successful 504 but added an extra set of wings and a new deep fuselage housing a fully enclosed cabin to seat four passengers. The aircraft was powered by a 160 hp (120 kW) Beardmore engine. The pilot sat in an open cockpit offset to port. The prototype flew well, having similar characteristics to a 504, the second example built was substantially modified, in order to compete in a British Air Ministry competition for a commercial aircraft, being fitted with a 240 hp (180 kW) Siddeley Puma engine. Designated 547A, this version turned out to be slow and unstable in the air and failed to win an award in the competition in August 1920. Damaged in a forced landing at the competition, the second prototype was scrapped in 1922.

Despite this, Queensland and Northern Territory Aerial Services (QANTAS) bought the first prototype in November 1920 for GBP 2,798 with the intention of using it on a route between Charleville and Katherine. It first flew after re-assembly in Australia on 2 March 1921, being damaged on landing and not being repaired for over a year. The 547 proved utterly unsuited to outback conditions and was quickly decommissioned, its fuselage ending its days as a chicken coop in Sydney.

== Operators ==
Australia

- Qantas

== Specifications (547) ==
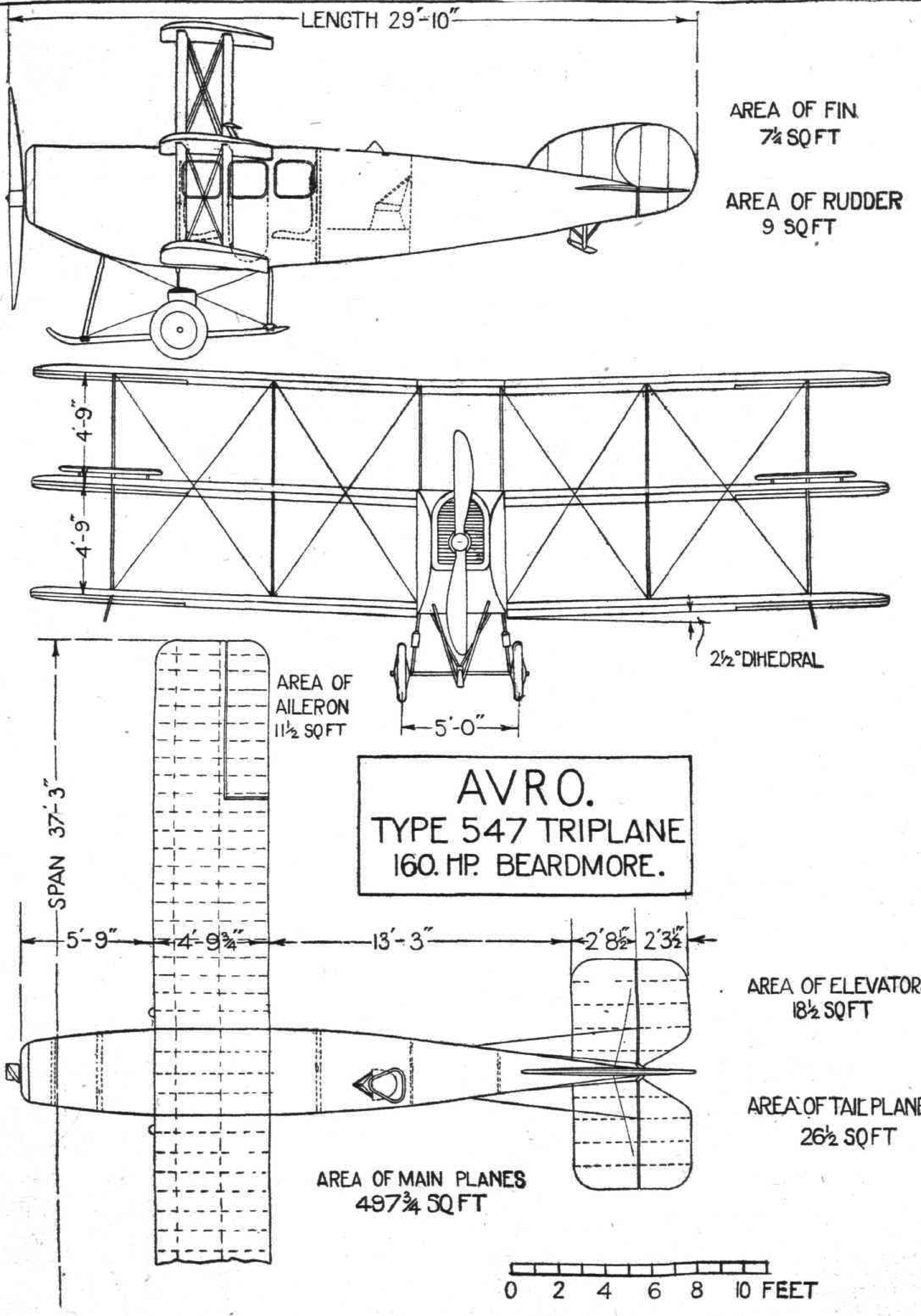
Avro 547

Data from Avro Aircraft since 1908

General characteristics

- Crew: one pilot
- Capacity: 4 passengers
- Length: 29 ft 10 in (9.10 m)
- Wingspan: 37 ft 3 in (11.36 m)
- Height: 14 ft 5 in (4.40 m)
- Wing area: 498 sq ft (46.3 m^{2})
- Empty weight: 2,077 lb (942 kg)
- Gross weight: 3,000 lb (1,360 kg)
- Powerplant: 1 × Beardmore , 160 hp (120 kW)

Performance

- Maximum speed: 96 mph (154 km/h, 83 kn)
- Cruise speed: 83 mph (134 km/h, 72 kn)
- Range: 230 mi (370 km, 200 nmi)
- Rate of climb: 333 ft/min (1.7 m/s)
