= Rolls-Royce Falcon =

Falcon
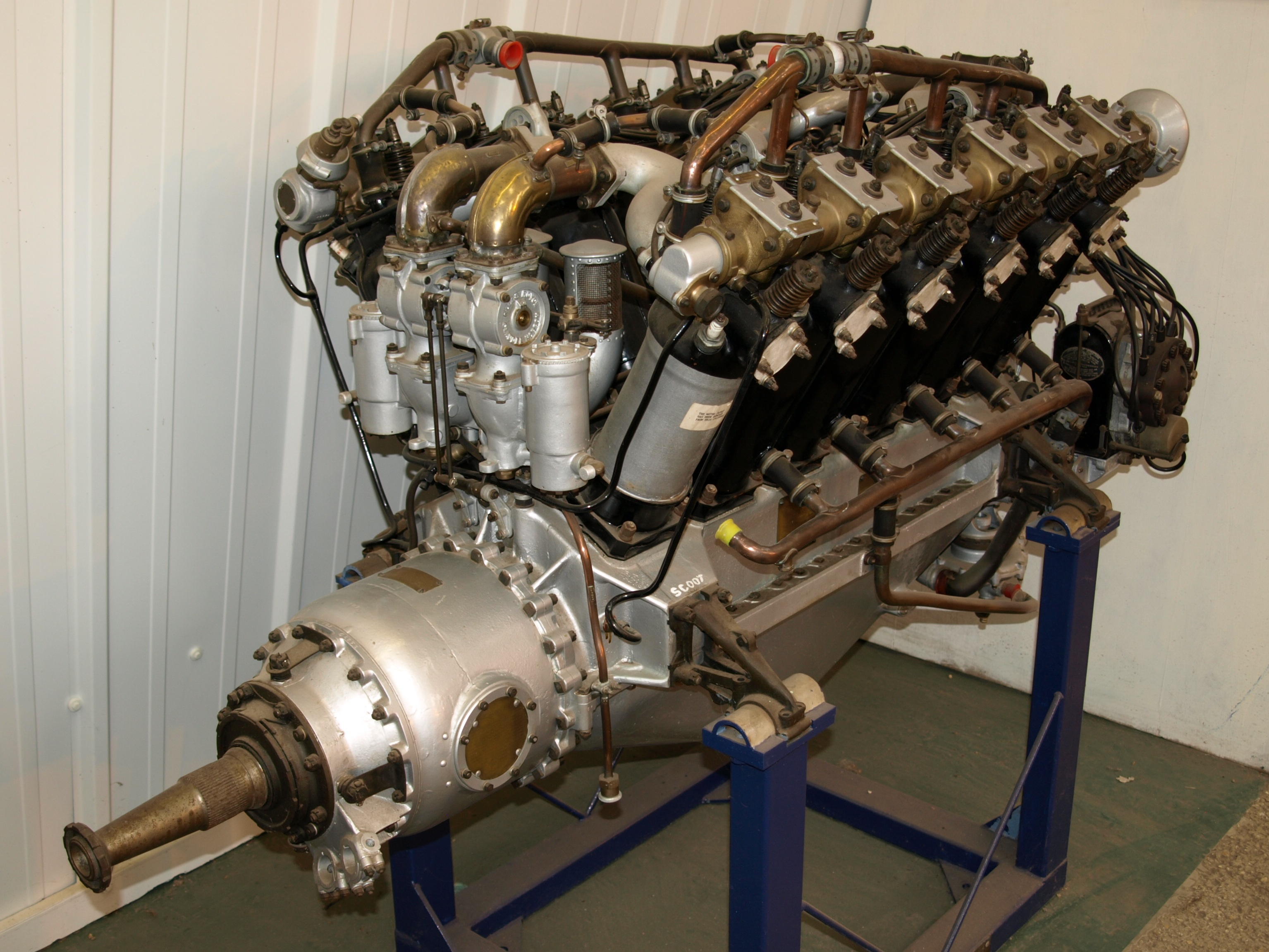
- Preserved Rolls-Royce Falcon III at the Shuttleworth Collection
- Type: V12 aero engine
- Manufacturer: Rolls-Royce Limited
- First run: 1915
- Major applications: Bristol F.2 Fighter; Blackburn Kangaroo
- Number built: 2,185
- Developed from: Rolls-Royce Eagle

The Rolls-Royce Falcon is an aero engine developed in 1915. It was a smaller version of the Rolls-Royce Eagle, a liquid-cooled V12 of 867 cu in (14.2 L) capacity. Fitted to many British World War I-era aircraft, production ceased in 1927. The Falcon was designed by R.W. Harvey-Bailey.

An airworthy Falcon survives today and powers a Bristol F.2 Fighter during summer displays.

== Design and development ==
Production of the Falcon began in September 1916 and was so successful that it was also manufactured under licence by Brazil Straker in Bristol. Production continued until 1927, by which time 2,185 had been built.

An unusual feature of this engine was the epicyclic propeller reduction gear which contained a clutch designed to limit the maximum torque, thus protecting the reduction gears.

The Falcon was notably used in the Bristol F.2 Fighter and Blackburn Kangaroo bomber.

== Variants ==
Note:

Falcon I (Rolls-Royce 190 hp Mk I)
(1916-17), 230 hp, 250 engines produced in both left- and right-hand tractor versions.
Falcon II (Rolls-Royce 190 hp Mk II)
(1917), 253 hp, carburettor size increased. 250 built at Derby.
Falcon III (Rolls-Royce 190 hp Mk III)
(1917-1927), 285 hp, increased compression ratio (5.3:1), twin carburettors replaced with four Rolls-Royce/Claudel-Hobson units. 1,685 built at Derby.

== Applications ==
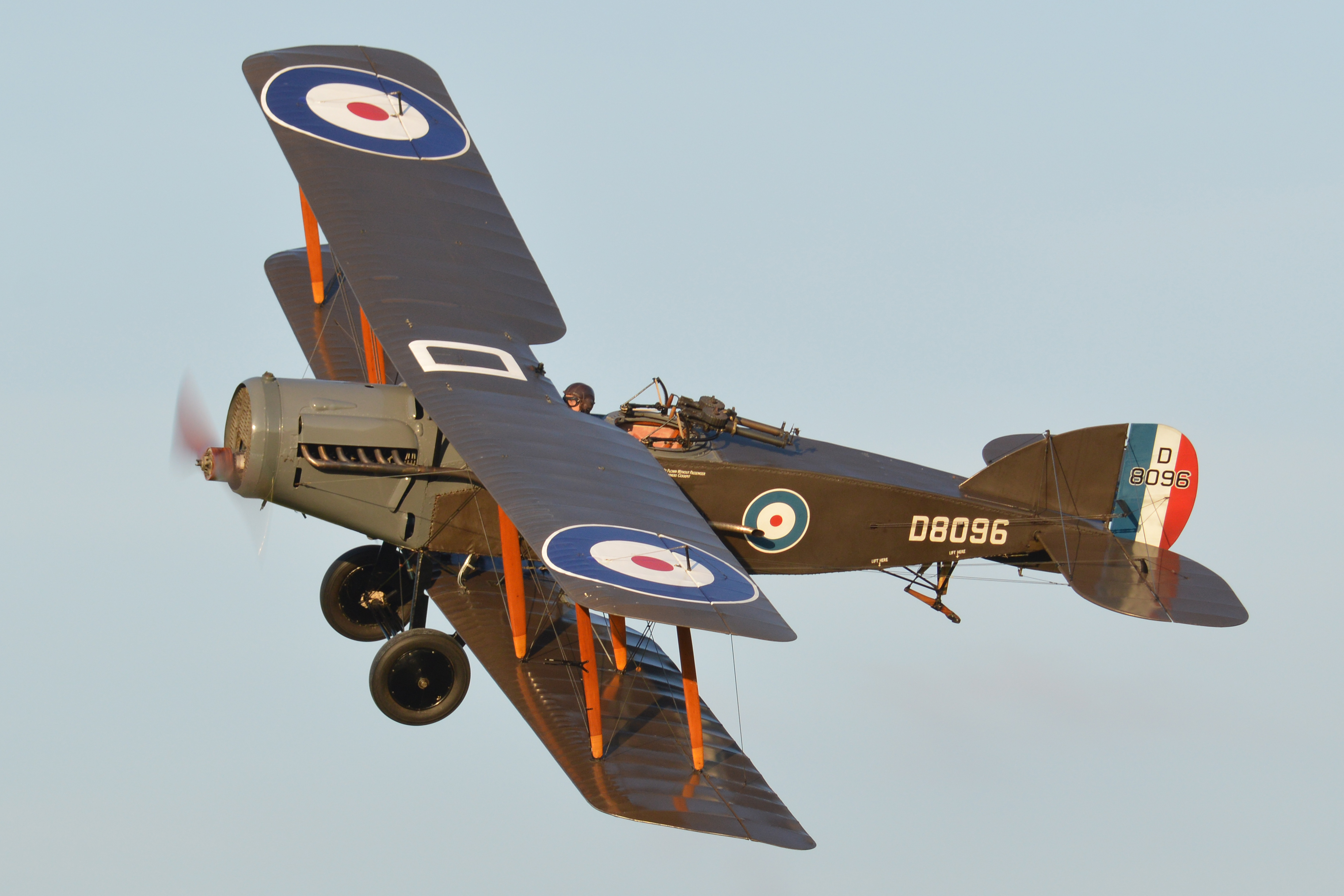
Rolls-Royce Falcon-powered Bristol F.2 Fighter

List from Guttery and Lumsden:

- Armstrong Whitworth F.K.12
- Avro 523C Pike
- Avro 529
- Blackburn G.P. Seaplane
- Blackburn Kangaroo
- Blackburn Sprat
- Bristol Type 12 F.2A
- Bristol Type 27 F.2B Coupe
- Bristol F.2 Fighter
- Bristol Type 86 Greek Tourer
- Bristol Type 96
- Curtiss H-12
- de Havilland DH.37
- Fairey F.2
- Fairey N.9
- Martinsyde F.3
- Martinsyde R.G
- Martinsyde Buzzard
- Parnall Perch
- Royal Aircraft Factory F.E.2
- Royal Aircraft Factory R.E.7
- Vickers F.B.14
- Vickers Viking Mk.I (prototype only)
- Vickers Vendace
- Vickers Vedette
- Westland Limousine
- Westland Wizard

== Surviving engines ==
Bristol F.2B Fighter, D-8096, is based at the Shuttleworth Collection and is powered by a Falcon III, this aircraft flies regularly in summer.

== Engines on display ==
- A Rolls-Royce Falcon is on public display at the Shuttleworth Collection, Bedfordshire.
- A Rolls-Royce Falcon is displayed at the Rolls-Royce Heritage Trust Collection (Derby).
- A Rolls-Royce Falcon is displayed at the South African Air Force Museum, Port Elizabeth

== Specifications (Falcon III) ==
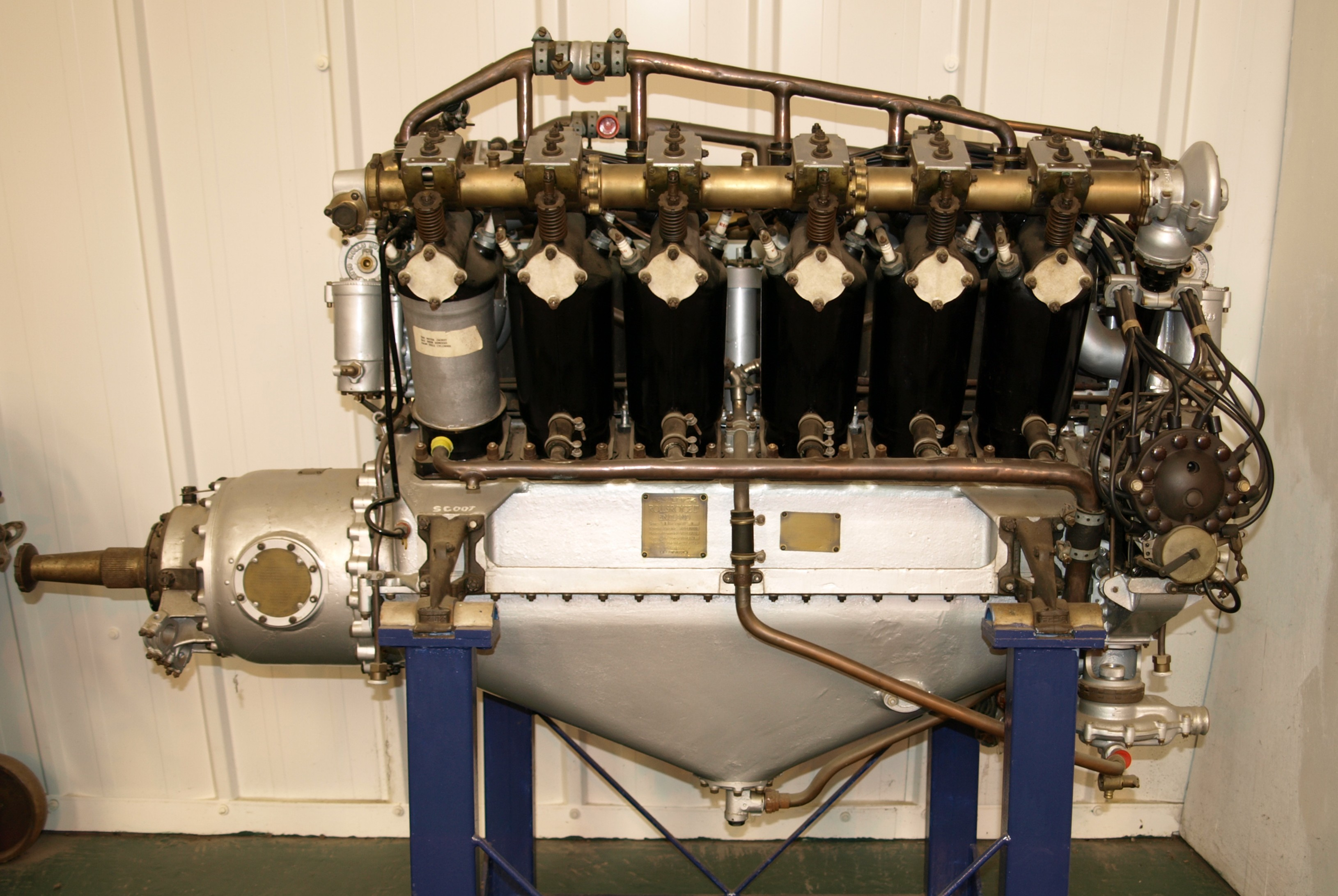

Data from Jane's and Lumsden.

=== General characteristics ===
- Type: 12-cylinder liquid-cooled 60 deg. Vee aircraft piston engine
- Bore: 4 in (101.6 mm)
- Stroke: 5.75 in (146 mm)
- Displacement: 866.5 in³ (14.2 L)
- Length: 68 in (1,727 mm)
- Width: 40.3 in (1,024 mm)
- Height: 37.2 in (945 mm)
- Dry weight: 715 lb (324 kg)

=== Components ===
- Valvetrain: Overhead camshaft, two valves per cylinder
- Fuel system: Four Rolls-Royce/Claudel-Hobson carburettors
- Fuel type: 40-50 octane petrol (pre-1923)
- Cooling system: Liquid-cooled

=== Performance ===
- Power output: 288 hp (215 kW) at 2,300 rpm at sea level
- Compression ratio: 5.3:1
- Fuel consumption: 18.5 Imp gal/hr (84 L/hr)
- Oil consumption: 0.75 Imp gal/hr (3.4 L/hr)
- Power-to-weight ratio: 0.4 hp/lb (0.66 kW/kg)

== See also ==
- Rolls-Royce aircraft piston engines

Related development

- Rolls-Royce Eagle

Related lists

- List of aircraft engines
