= Beardmore Halford Pullinger =

Beardmore-Halford-Pullinger (BHP) were a series of aircraft engines produced in the United Kingdom between 1916 and 1920. The acronym BHP comes from the surnames of the three key individuals involved in the development and manufacturing of the engines; William Beardmore, Frank Halford and Thomas Pullinger.

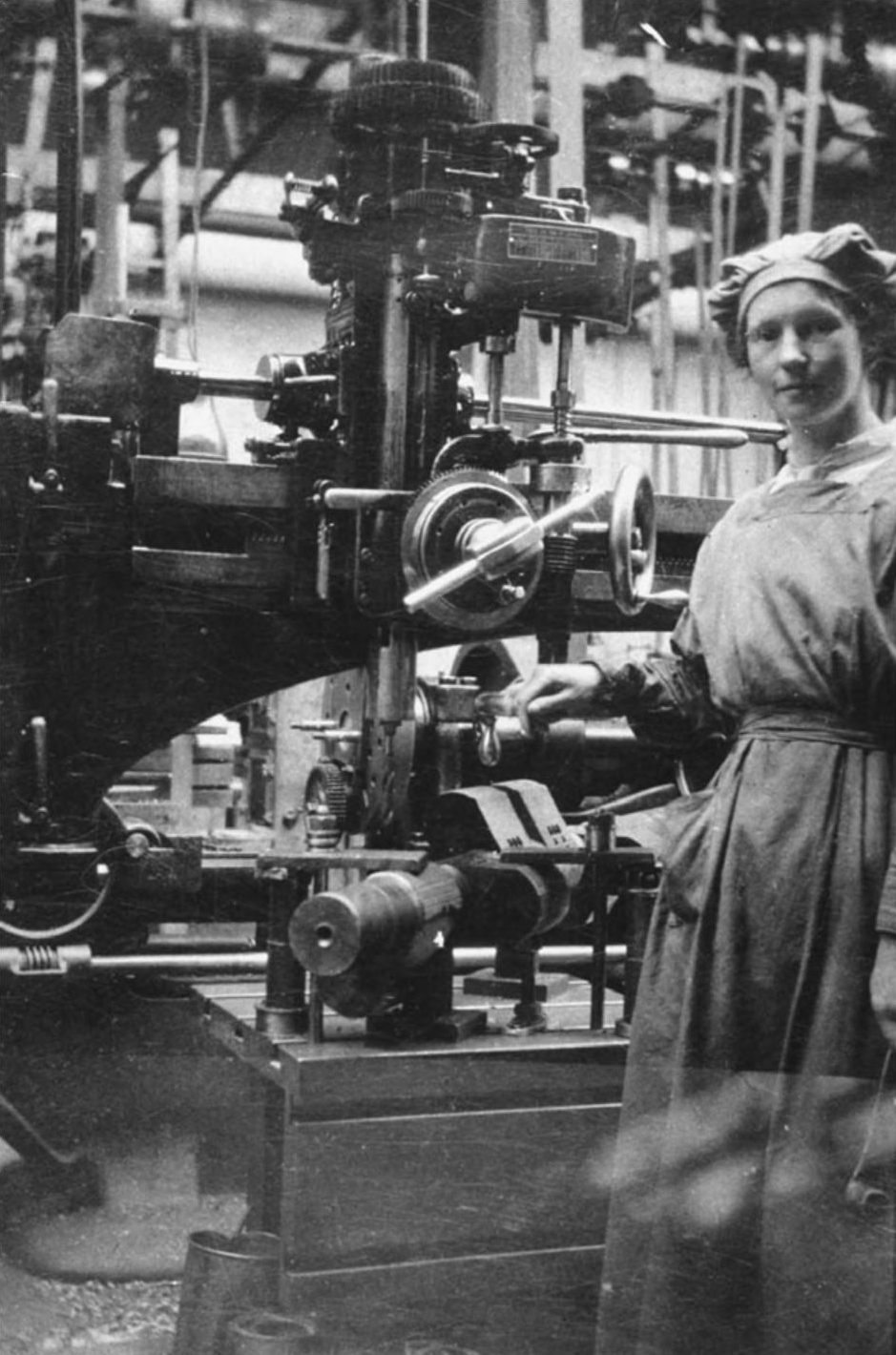
Technician boring out forged conrods for a 230 hp (170 kW) BHP aircraft engine at Galloway Engineering's works in Kirkcudbright, Scotland

Galloway Engineering, a subsidiary of William Beardmore and Company, was formed during 1916 in the Scottish town of Kirkcudbright to produce the BHP engines. BHP's designs were also licensed to Siddeley-Deasy in Coventry who ended up producing the vast majority of the BHP engines. BHP engines were used on many First World War aircraft, including the Airco DH.4 and DH.9.

== Formation ==
The name BHP is derived from surnames of three people:

- Sir William Beardmore of William Beardmore and Company: Responsible for funding and providing original engines from his production company, which manufactured aero engines used in many aircraft prior to 1916 such as the Beardmore 120 hp and 160 hp.
- Frank Halford: Responsible for proposing modifications to the engines originally taken from Beardmore designs. Brevet captain Halford worked for the Air Inspection Directorate (AID) at Farnborough. He later designed the first turbocharged racing car engine, the Halford Special, all the engines made by de Havilland including jets and rockets, and several engines for D. Napier & Son, including the Sabre.
- Thomas Pullinger: Halford's proposals were made a working proposition by engineer and managing director of the Arrol-Johnston car factory T C Pullinger.

The initials BHP also conveniently corresponded to the abbreviation for brake horsepower.

== 230 BHP engine ==
Beardmore started building aero-engines in 1913 when the group acquired the rights for licensed production of the Austro-Daimler 6. Arrol-Johnston (a Beardmore subsidiary involved in automobile production) produced the Austro-Daimler 90 hp (67 kW) and 120 hp (89 kW) engines at their facility in Dumfries, Scotland. The 120 hp (89 kW) engine was further developed at the Arrol-Johnson works with inputs from Frank Halford who was assigned as a liaison officer. Changes included the introduction of twin carburetors and dual ignition. The resulting engine was sold as the Beardmore 160 hp.

Halford and Pullinger then designed a completely new engine to compete with the latest German inline six-cylinder models. A new company, Galloway Engineering Co. Ltd. was set up in Kirkcudbright, near Dumfries, to continue development and production. Galloway Engineering employed a predominantly female workforce. After World War I, the factory switched to automobile production producing a line of Galloway branded cars which were marketed under the slogan “a car made by ladies for others of their sex".

Although BHP's design was projected to produce 300 hp (224 kW) the engine's output came in below expectations. The original name given to the engine was the 200 BHP. The engine's name was later changed to the 230 BHP to better reflect its actual output. Finally, the engine's name was changed to the Galloway Adriatic.

The 230 BHP engine was also licensed to Siddeley-Deasy, to be assembled at their Parkside works. In addition to building the Adriatic engines, Galloway also supplied components to Siddeley-Deasy. John Siddeley himself worked on the engine and, after making many changes, released the engine as the Siddeley Puma. The Puma was later developed into the ADC Nimbus.

In British military service both Siddeley and Galloway built engines were known as the 230 BHP although they had different dimensions and few interchangeable parts.

Relatively few Galloway Adriatic engines were built. At the end of WW1, the RAF had 89 Galloway built engines in service versus 3,255 engines assembled by Siddeley-Deasy. All of the Galloway built engines were fitted to aircraft based in the United Kingdom.

== V12 derivatives ==
- Galloway Atlantic. Two cylinder banks from the Galloway Adriatic combined on a single crank shaft to create the V12 configuration Atlantic, rated at 500 hp (370 kW).
- Siddeley Pacific. Two cylinder banks from the Siddeley Puma combined on a single crank shaft to create the V12 configuration Pacific, rated at 500 hp (370 kW).
- Siddeley Tiger. Same configuration as the Siddeley Pacific but with bored-out cylinders allowing the engine's rating to be increased to 600 hp (450 kW).

== See also ==
Related lists

- List of aircraft engine manufacturers
