= Galloway Adriatic =

WW1 era inline-6 aircraft engine

Adriatic
- Galloway Adriatic
- Type: Water-cooled, inline-six aero engine
- National origin: United Kingdom
- Manufacturer: William Beardmore and Company
- First run: 1916
- Major applications: Airco DH.4; Airco DH.9
- Number built: 94
- Developed from: Beardmore 160 hp
- Developed into: Galloway Atlantic

The Galloway Adriatic was a WW1-era inline-six aircraft engine. The engine was developed by the Beardmore Halford Pullinger (BHP) design group and manufactured by Galloway Engineering, a subsidiary of William Beardmore and Company based in Kirkcudbright, Scotland.

In British military service the engine was known as the 230 BHP, a designation it shared with a version of the same engine built by Siddeley-Deasy, which later became known as the Siddeley Puma. Although the Galloway and Siddeley-Deasy versions followed a similar design, they had different dimensions and few interchangeable parts.

Difficulties related to the casting of the complex aluminium cylinder blocks delayed deliveries of the engine and only 94 Galloway Adriatic engines were completed. Galloway also built parts for Siddeley-Deasy whose version of the engine had a much larger production run with 4,228 units built.

Galloway Engineering later developed the V12 Galloway Atlantic aero engine by combining two banks of cylinders from the Galloway Adriatic onto a single crankshaft. Some Adriatic engines were also fitted with experimental superchargers designed by Harry Ricardo.

== Design and development ==
The Adriatic was one of a series of upright, water-cooled inline aircraft engines produced by Beardmore (the ‘B’ in the B.H.P. acronym) and its subsidiary companies. Production began in 1913, when Beardmore acquired the rights for licensed manufacturing of the Austro-Daimler 6, designed by Ferdinand Porsche. These engines were produced at the Beardmore-owned Arrol-Johnston factories in Coatbridge and Dumfries. Arrol-Johnston’s chief engineer, Thomas Pullinger (the ‘P’ in B.H.P.), led improvements to the original design, resulting in the Beardmore 160 hp.

Frank Halford (the ‘H’ in B.H.P.) joined Beardmore in 1916 as a liaison officer from the Aeronautical Inspection Department (AID). At the time of his arrival, a prototype of a new 230 hp (170 kW) engine was under development, but was underperforming, unreliable and lacking power. The prototype followed the general principles of Porsche’s original design, with individually forged steel cylinders. (Note: The team of engineers sent from Vienna to Scotland to set up Beardmore’s aircraft engine production lines are thought to have been responsible for the initial design of what later became the Galloway Adriatic. As citizens of the Austro-Hungarian Empire, they were interned at the start of World War I.) Before joining Beardmore, Halford had served in France, where he studied French aero engine developments. He was known to admire the Hispano-Suiza 8, which featured a monobloc cylinder head casting for each bank of four cylinders.

Galloway Adriatic's three-cylinder block assembly. Head is cast in one piece and is shown with two of the three-cylinder barrels screwed in. Single steel water jacket in front.

The Adriatic's cylinders were constructed in groups of three. The head of each block was made from a single aluminium casting incorporating the three combustion chambers, valve seats, and a water jacket. The relatively large and intricate aluminum casting was challenging to produce which led to significant production delays. Due to the difficulties of casting aluminum, some Adriatic engines were built using easier to produce, cast iron cylinder head blocks. Three threaded steel cylinder barrels where screwed into each cylinder head. A single steel stamping formed the cooling water jacket for groups of three cylinder barrels.

View of the head casting showing one large intake valve seat for each cylinder with two smaller positions for the exhaust valves.

Each cylinder contained one large inlet valve and two smaller exhaust valves. This unusual three valve per cylinder design was common to both the Adriatic and Puma engines.

Pistons were made of cast aluminum alloy and were fitted with three cast-iron piston rings.

The crankshaft was a hollow forging made of chrome-nickel steel supported by eight bearings. Seven were plain bearings made of babbitt alloy encased in steel shells. The other bearing was a double thrust rolling-element bearing which took all the axial load from the propeller. The camshaft was fitted in an aluminum housing running the entire length of the engine.

The engine's ignition system had 100% redundancy with two spark plugs per cylinder and two magnetos.

The prototype BHP engine was completed and test-run in June 1916. This engine powered the prototype Airco DH.4 on its first flight in August 1916.

Although the BHP's design was initially projected to produce 300 hp (224 kW), the engine's output came in below expectations. Originally named the 200 BHP, the engine was later redesignated the 230 BHP to better reflect its actual output, with the BHP designation carrying a double meaning, representing both Beardmore, Halford and Pullinger and brake horsepower. Finally, the engine was renamed the Galloway Adriatic.

In April 1917, a Galloway Adriatic powered the prototype Airco DH.9 (A7559) on its maiden flight. Although the aircraft performed well it was tested without its intended 460 lb (209 kg) bomb load.

In British military service the engine was known as the 230 BHP, a designation it shared with a version of the same engine built by Siddeley-Deasy. Although the Galloway and Siddeley-Deasy versions followed a similar design, they had different dimensions and few interchangeable parts. Siddeley-Deasy developed their version of the 230 BHP as the Siddeley Puma.

In 1918, Galloway developed the V12 Atlantic, a twelve-cylinder configuration of the Adriatic engine, created by mounting two Adriatic cylinder banks on a single crankcase. The Atlantic's cylinder heads were made of cast iron.

== Production ==
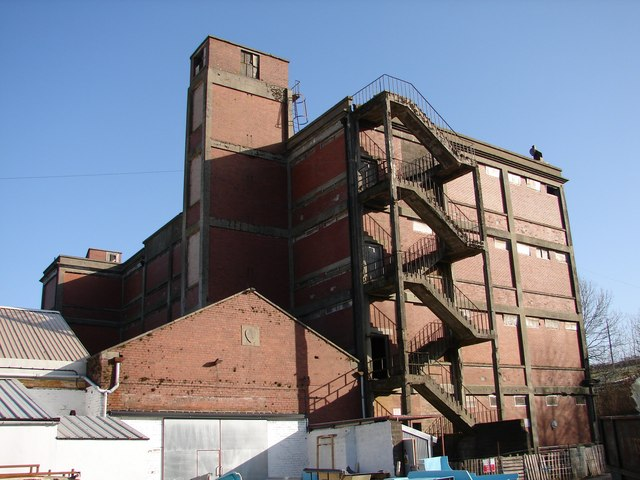
The former Galloway Engineering works in Kirkcudbright, Scotland

The Adriatic was produced at Galloway Engineering’s Kirkcudbright facility. Galloway Engineering, a subsidiary of William Beardmore and Company, was specifically established to manufacture Beardmore Halford Pullinger (B.H.P.) engines. Some engine components were produced by Arrol-Johnston, another Beardmore subsidiary located in the nearby town of Dumfries. While the Adriatic was in production, Arrol-Johnston continued manufacturing the Beardmore 160 hp engine.

Setting up the new Kirkcudbright facility delayed the production of the new engine, as the factory was not fully operational before the end of World War I. Casting of the aluminum cylinders blocks proved to be difficult with an 80% rejection rate due to porosity. The casting issues were not fully resolved until the spring of 1918.

Ultimately Galloway Engineering only managed to produce 94 out of an order for 560 engines. Due to delays in delivery, Crossley Motors and Siddeley-Deasy were awarded contracts by the War Office to produce additional BHP engines. Crossley Motors failed to build any of the 500 engines awarded to them. Siddeley-Deasy received an order for 11,500 engines of which 4,228 were completed. Siddeley-Deasy made numerous designs changes to their version of the 230 BHP. The resulting engine was not interchangeable with the Galloway Adriatic and was later marketed as the Siddeley Puma.

In addition to the 94 Adriatic engines produced by Galloway, the firm also supplied components to Siddeley Deasy. At the end of World War I, the Royal Air Force held 89 Adriatic engines in its inventory, either fitted to aircraft or held as spare units, compared with 3,255 Puma engines built by Siddeley-Deasy. All Adriatic engines held by the Royal Air Force were assigned to units based in the United Kingdom. All outstanding orders for Puma and Adriatic engines were cancelled at the end of World War I.

Galloway Engineering employed a predominantly female workforce. After the war the factory switched to automobile production producing a line of Galloway branded cars which were marketed under the slogan “a car made by ladies for others of their sex".

== Ricardo superchargers ==
Harry Ricardo began experimenting with superchargers in 1913 and completed his first test engine in 1915, but was unable to interest either the War Office or the Royal Naval Air Service in pursuing further development of the concept. In 1916, Ricardo began working with Beardmore, Halford, and Pullinger on the development of a supercharged version of the 230 BHP aircraft engine. Owing to delays in the engine's development, Frank Halford enlisted the assistance of the Armstrong Whitworth company to support the project.

Ricardo’s supercharger did not use a separate blower; instead, the underside of the engine’s pistons functioned as air pumps. As the piston rose on the exhaust stroke, fresh air was drawn through self-closing reed valves into a chamber. On the induction stroke, the descending piston compressed this air and forced it through cooling passages to a ring of ports in the cylinder wall just above the piston at bottom dead centre. In addition to increasing the mass of air in the cylinder, Ricardo's design created a stratified fuel-air mixture, with a rich mixture around the spark plug to promote rapid ignition and a lean mixture throughout the remainder of the cylinder to improve fuel economy. The disadvantage of this design was that some mixing of exhaust gasses and inlet air occurred on the engine's power stroke.

During the design process, it was found that the addition of a new compression chamber further increased the height of the already tall BHP engine, further obstructing of the pilot's forward view. The solution was found by redesigning the engine as an inverted inline six-cylinder, with the cylinder heads positioned at the bottom.

By the end of the First World War, two engines had been completed, and bench testing demonstrated a small increase in output to 260 hp (194 kW). One of the supercharged engines was installed in an Airco DH.4 bomber and underwent flight testing.

== Applications ==
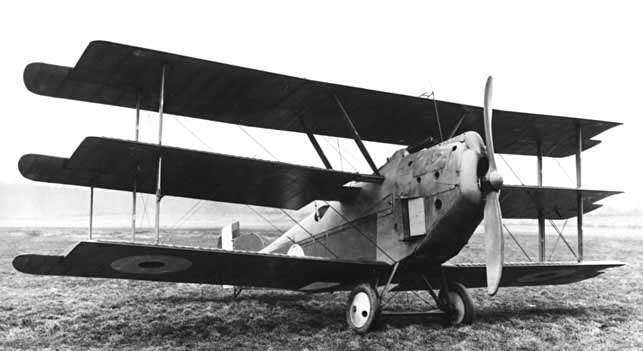
Sopwith Rhino triplane powered by a single Galloway Adriatic engine

- Airco DH.4
- Airco DH.9
- Avro 529
- Beardmore W.B.1
- Bristol F.2 Fighter
- Airco DH.10
- Sopwith Rhino

== Specifications (with aluminium cylinder heads) ==
Data from Engineering and Lumsden

=== General characteristics ===
- Type: Water–cooled, upright, inline-6 piston engine
- Bore: 5.71 in (145 mm)
- Stroke: 7.48 in (190 mm)
- Displacement: 1,149.24 cu in (18.83 L)
- Length: 67.2 in (1,707 mm)
- Width: 18.7 in (475 mm)
- Height: 43.7 in (1,110 mm)
- Dry weight: Engine Only: 605 lb (274 kg). With radiator and cooling piping: 767 lb (348 kg)

=== Components ===
- Valvetrain: One intake + two exhaust valves per cylinder
- Fuel system: Two Zenith carburettors mounted on the right side of the crankcase
- Fuel type: Gasoline
- Oil system: Dry sump. Vacuum distilled mineral oil.
- Cooling system: Water-cooled. One centrifugal pump.
- Reduction gear: None. Direct drive.
- Rotation: Counterclockwise when looking end on at the propeller hub

=== Performance ===
- Power output: 240 hp (179 kW) @ 1400 rpm
- Compression ratio: 4.96:1
- Fuel consumption: 17.5 imp gal/h (80 L/h)
- Oil consumption: 7 imp pt/h (4 L/h)

== See also ==
Comparable engines

- Austro-Daimler 6
- Benz Bz.IV
- Hiero 6
- Mercedes D.IVa

Related lists

- List of aircraft engines
