= Airco DH.4 =

British bomber used during the First World War

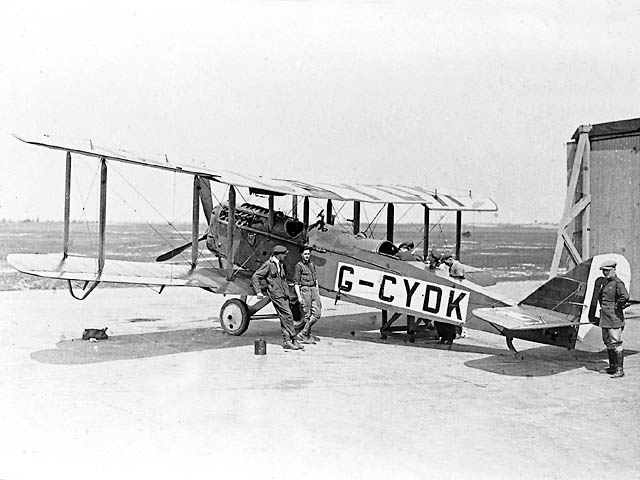
- A Canadian DH.4 registered G-CYDK parked.

General information
- Type: Light bomber / General purpose
- Manufacturer: Airco
- Built by: Boeing Airplane Corporation; Dayton-Wright Company; Fisher Body; Standard Aircraft Corporation
- Status: Retired
- Primary users: Royal Flying Corps Royal Air Force; Royal Naval Air Service; United States Army Air Service
- Number built: 6,295, of which 4,846 were built in the United States.

History
- Introduction date: March 1917
- First flight: August 1916
- Retired: 1932 (United States Army Air Service)
- Developed into: Airco DH.9; Airco DH.9A; Dayton-Wright Cabin Cruiser

The Airco DH.4 is a British two-seat biplane day bomber of the First World War. It was designed by Geoffrey de Havilland (hence "DH") for Airco, and was the first British two-seat light day-bomber capable of defending itself.

It was designed and developed specifically as a bomber, as well as aerial reconnaissance missions. The DH.4 was to have been powered by the new 160 hp (119 kW) Beardmore Halford Pullinger (BHP) engine, but problems with that resulted in numerous other engines being used, perhaps the best of which was the 375 hp (280 kW) Rolls-Royce Eagle engine. The DH.4 first flew in August 1916 and it entered operational service in France on 6 March 1917 less than a year later. The majority were manufactured as general purpose two-seaters in the United States for the American expeditionary forces in France, becoming the only American made plane to see combat in World War I.

Following the Armistice of 11 November 1918, many DH.4s were sold to civil operators where it was found to be particularly useful as a mailplane. Early commercial passenger airplane service in Europe was initiated with modified variants of the DH-4. War-surplus DH-4s became key aircraft in newly emerging air forces throughout the world. The U.S. Army later had several companies re-manufacture its remaining DH.4s to DH.4B standard and they operated the type into the early 1930s.

== Development ==
=== Origins ===
The DH.4 was designed by Geoffrey de Havilland as a light two-seat combat aircraft, and was intended to perform both day bomber and aerial reconnaissance missions. The intention was for it to be powered by the newly developed 160 hp (120 kW) Beardmore Halford Pullinger (BHP) engine. The DH.4 was developed in parallel to the rival Bristol Fighter. During August 1916, the prototype DH.4 made its first flight, powered by a prototype 230 hp (172 kW) BHP engine.

Initial flight tests revealed it to have favourable handling and performance. The Central Flying School (CFS) conducted early evaluation flights using the prototype, leading to it producing a favourable report on the aircraft, observing good stability in flight, light flying controls and its relatively comfortable crew positions. During its flights with the CFS, it was able to attain previously unheard-of time-to-altitude figures which were unmatched by any of its predecessors. While flying trials with the prototype had been producing promising results, it soon became clear that the BHP engine would require a major redesign prior to entering production.

Even by the time of flying trials with the first prototype, there had been no finalised plans for quantity production of the BHP engine. Coincidentally, another suitable and promising aeroengine, the water-cooled Rolls-Royce Eagle in-line engine, was approaching the end of its development process. According to Bruce, the Eagle shared the same basic configuration as the BHP engine, which greatly aided in its adoption by de Havilland, as did the engine's endorsement by William Beardmore. During the summer of 1916, a second prototype, equipped with the Rolls-Royce engine, conducted its first flight.

In response to its favourable performance, the Royal Flying Corps (RFC) decided to place an initial order for the type during late 1916. Separately to the RFC's interactions with the DH.4, it had received substantial interest from the Royal Navy as well. The Admiralty decided to order a further pair of prototypes, configured to suit the service's own requirements, for evaluation purposes; however, according to Bruce, it is unlikely that the second of these was ever constructed. Following trials with the first of these prototypes, orders were placed for the production of DH.4s to equip the Royal Naval Air Service.

=== Production ===
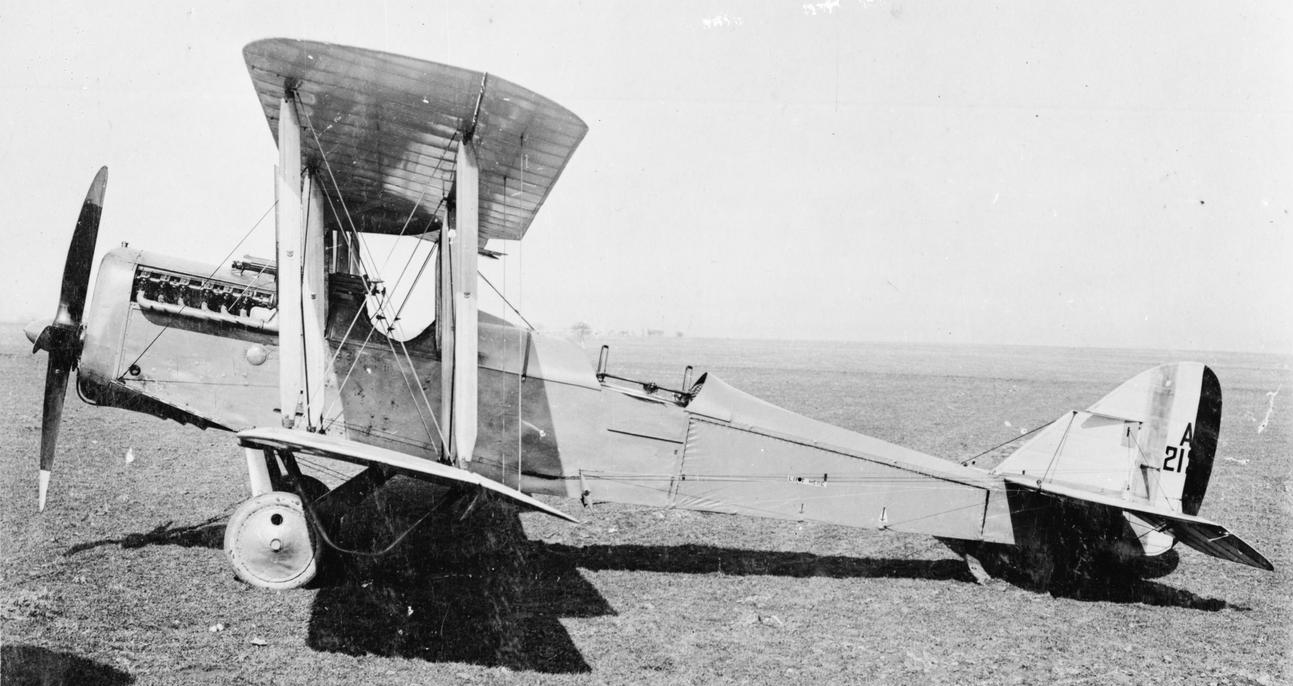
An early production DH.4

During late 1916, the first order for 50 DH.4s, powered by 250 hp (190 kW) Eagle III engines, was received from the RFC. According to Bruce, it was not a surprise to most observers that the Eagle had been selected to power the first batch of production DH.4s. The initial production aircraft were largely identical to the second prototype, the main difference being the adoption of armament, which included a single synchronised 0.303 in (7.7 mm) Vickers machine gun for the pilot, while the observer was provided with a 0.303 in (7.7 mm) Lewis gun mounted on a Scarff ring.

Production of the DH.4 was performed by a variety of companies beyond Airco themselves; these included F.W. Berwick and Co, Glendower Aircraft Company, Palladium Autocars, Vulcan Motor and Engineering, and the Westland Aircraft Works. By the end of production, a total of 1,449 aircraft (from orders for 1,700 aircraft) were constructed in Britain for the Royal Flying Corps (RFC) and the Royal Naval Air Service (RNAS). Overseas, SABCA of Belgium produced a further 15 DH.4s during 1926.

As production progressed, various changes and improvements to the design were introduced upon the DH.4. As time went on, production DH.4s were fitted with Eagle engines of increasing power, ending with the 375 hp (280 kW) Eagle VIII, which powered the majority of frontline DH.4s by the end of 1917. However, this transition was greatly hindered as by January 1917, it had become clear that there was a chronic shortage of Rolls-Royce aero engines, and of the Eagle in particular; it has been claimed by Bruce that this shortfall was partially the result of protracted decision-making on the part of the Air Board.

In response to the limited availability of the Eagle, extensive investigations into the use of alternative engines for the DH.4 were conducted. This resulted in aircraft being outfitted with a diverse range of engines; these included the BHP (230 hp (170 kW), the Royal Aircraft Factory RAF3A (200 hp (150 kW)), the Siddeley Puma (230 hp (170 kW)) and the 260 hp (190 kW) Fiat, all of which were used to power production aircraft, with varying degrees of success. None of these engines proved to be capable of matching the performance of the Eagle engine, which remained the preferred options despite the persistent supply constraints.

=== American versions ===
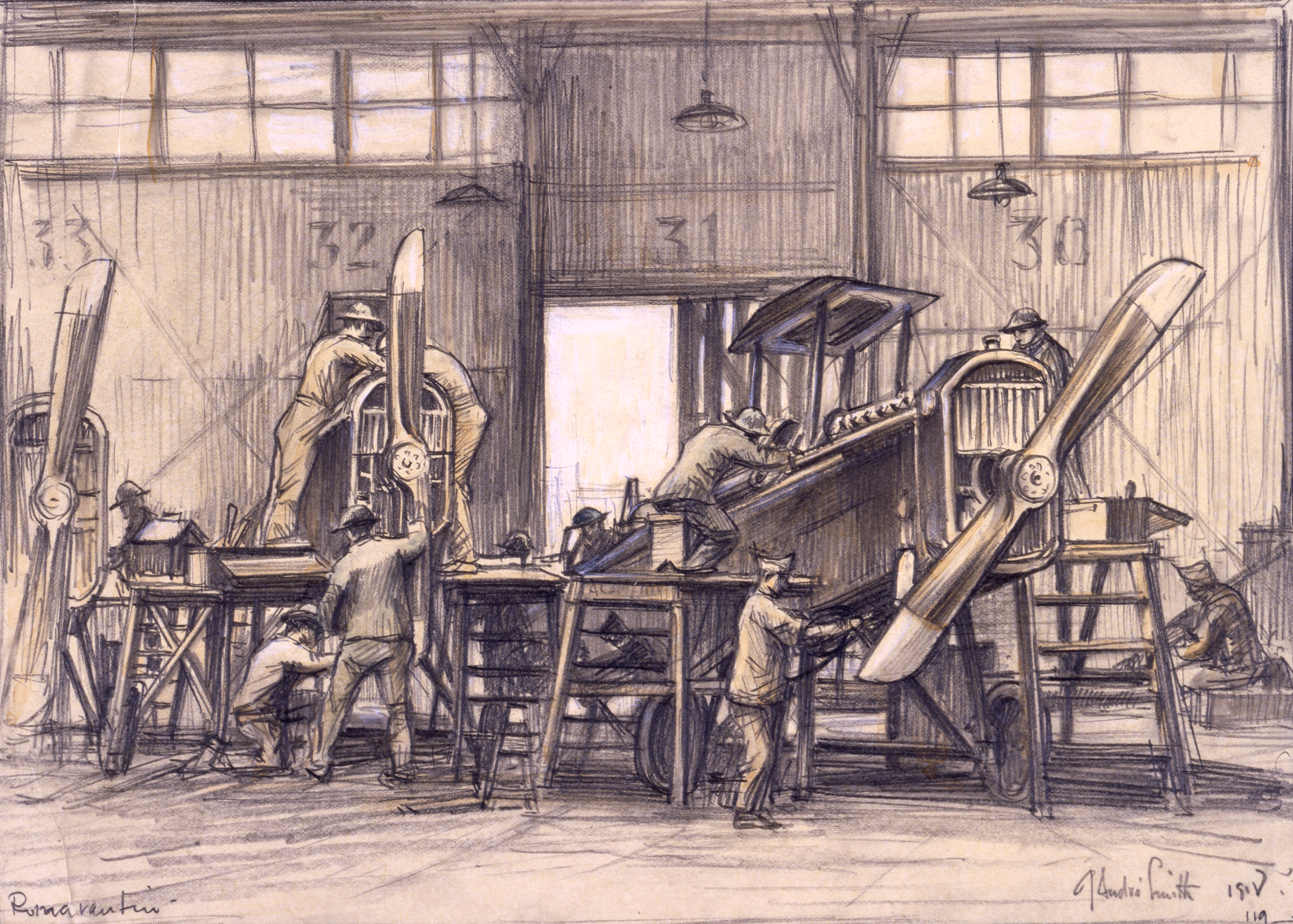
American DH.4 planes being assembled in France during World War One

At the time of entry of the United States into the First World War on 6 April 1917, the aviation section of the U.S. Signal Corps was unprepared, not being equipped with any aircraft suitable for combat. However, considerable optimism and energy was put into addressing this identified need, leading to the mobilization of American industry to set about the production of contemporary combat aircraft. As there were no suitable aircraft domestically, a technical commission, known as the Bolling Commission, was dispatched to Europe to seek out the best available combat aircraft and to make arrangements to enable their production to be established in the United States. As a result of the efforts of the Bolling Commission, the DH.4, along with the Bristol F.2 Fighter, the Royal Aircraft Factory S.E.5, and French SPAD S.XIII were selected. On 27 July 1917, a single DH.4 was sent to the United States as a pattern aircraft. It was not until 1918 that the first American-built DH.4s came off the production line. Several different manufacturers, including the Boeing Airplane Corporation, Dayton-Wright Company, the Fisher Body Corporation, and the Standard Aircraft Corporation produced this Americanized variant of the DH.4, featuring over 1,000 modifications from the original British design, to equip the American air services. A total of 9,500 DH.4s were ordered from American manufacturers, of which 1,885 actually reached France during the war. In American production, the new Liberty engine, which had proved suitable as a DH.4 power plant, was adopted. The Liberty was also eventually adopted by the British to power the DH.9A variant of the type.

After the war, a number of firms, most significant of these being Boeing, were contracted by the U.S. Army to remanufacture surplus DH.4s to the improved DH.4B standard. Internally referred to by Boeing as the Model 16, deliveries of 111 aircraft from this manufacturer took place between March and July 1920; reportedly, roughly 50 of these were returned for further refurbishments three years later.

During 1923, the Army placed an order for a new DH.4 variant from Boeing, distinguished by a fuselage of fabric-covered steel tube in place of the original plywood structure. These three prototypes were designated DH.4M-1 (M for modernized) and were ordered into production alongside the generally similar DH.4M-2 developed by Atlantic Aircraft. A total of 22 of the 163 DH.4M-1s were converted by the Army into dual-control trainers (DH.4M-1T) and a few more into target tugs (DH.4M-1K). Thirty of the aircraft ordered by the Army were diverted to the Navy for Marine Corps use, these designated O2B-1 for the base model, and O2B-2 for aircraft equipped for night and cross-country flying.

== Design ==
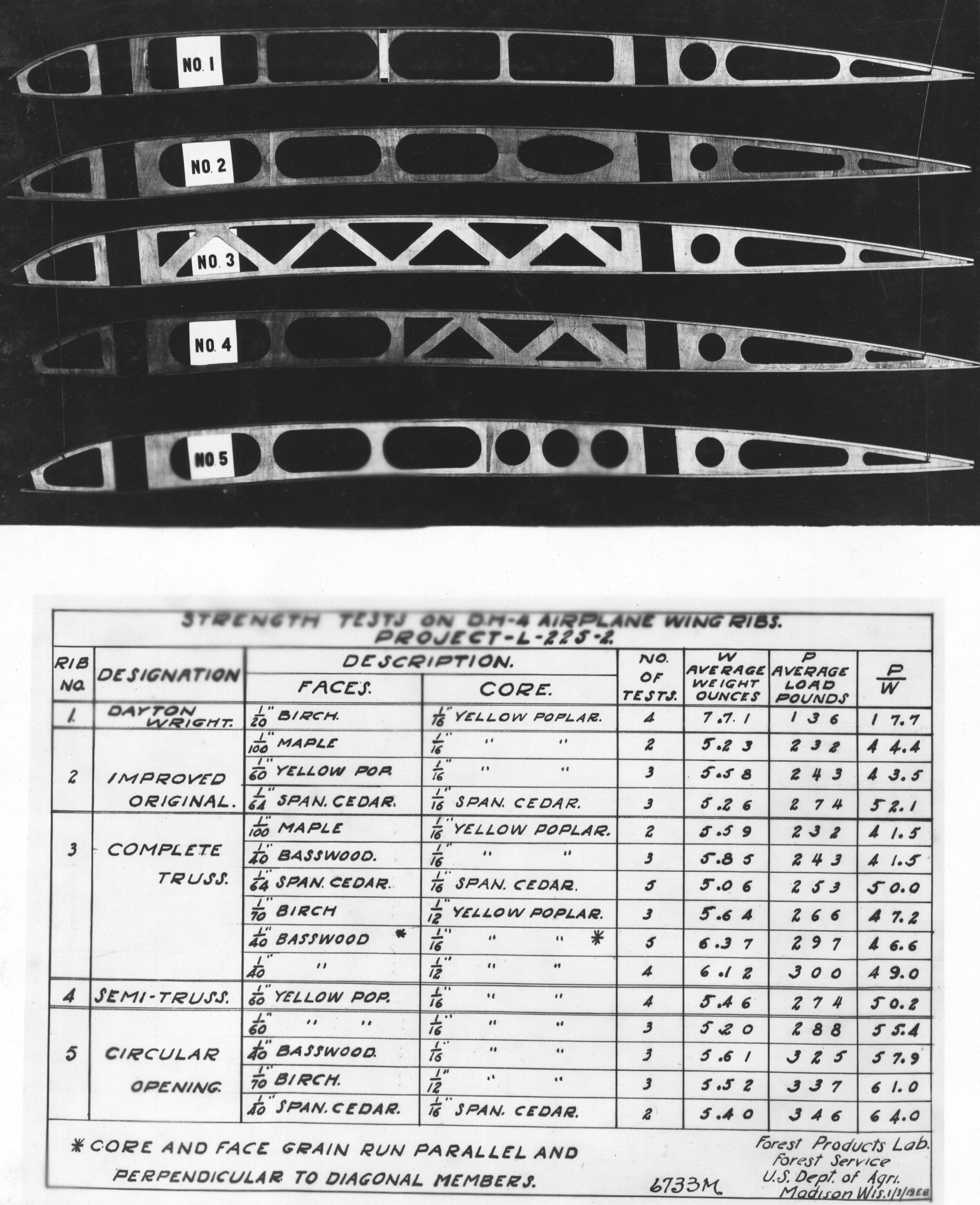
Strength tests on various DH-4 wing ribs during World War I

The Airco DH.4 was a conventional tractor two bay biplane of all-wooden construction. It was entirely built of traditional materials. The forward fuselage section and the underside of the tail area was covered by a 3mm plywood skin; this construction led to the fuselage being both strong and lightweight, heavily contributing to cross-bracing only being used for the four bays directly behind the rear cockpit. The nose of the aircraft was considerably longer than necessary, the cowling having been originally designed to accommodate the Beardmore Halford Pullinger (BHP) engine, rather than the Rolls-Royce Eagle that was adopted for production instead.

The DH.4 was powered by a variety of engines, including the Eagle, the BHP, the American Liberty, Royal Aircraft Factory RAF3A, the Siddeley Puma and the Fiat. Regardless of the engine used, it drove a four-bladed propeller mounted upon the nose. Cooling for the engine was provided via an oval-shaped radiator, while a port-mounted exhaust manifold discarded waste emissions above the upper wing. An unusual modification featuring on a small proportion of production DH.4s was the inversion of the engine, a design change that had been implemented in order to better accommodate the relatively-tall Ricardo-Halford-Armstrong (RHA) supercharged engine, which would otherwise unduly obstruct the pilot's forward field of view.

The DH.4 was operated by a crew of two, who were accommodated in widely spaced cockpits, between which the fuel tank was positioned. While the crew arrangement provided good fields of view for both the pilot and observer; however, it had the noticeable downside of causing communication problems between the two crew members, particularly during combat situations, where the speaking tube that linked the two cockpits was of only limited use. On the majority of American-built aircraft, the pilot's seating and fuel tank arrangement were switched around; aviation author Peter M Bowers credits this change with improving the pilot's safety in the event of a crash, as well as allowing for better communication with the observer.

The DH.4 was armed with a single forward-firing synchronised Vickers machine gun along with either one or two .303 in (7.7 mm) Lewis guns fitted on a Scarff ring fired by the observer. It could carry 460 lb (210 kg) of bombs, which could be mounted upon external racks. There were several alterations to the aircraft's armament throughout its production life, such as improvement in the ergonomics of the observer's Lewis gun and the installation of an additional Vickers gun. A pair of DH.4s were outfitted with COW 37 mm guns for experimental purposes, but the war came to a close prior to firing trials being conducted. All armaments would typically be removed from those DH.4s that were used by civil operators, including ex-military aircraft that were sold on in great numbers following the end of the Great War.

One of the more elaborate modifications of the DH.4 was the adaptation of the type as a seaplane. It was furnished with large floats, which were allegedly based upon the design of those used upon the German Hansa-Brandenburg W.29 seaplane. According to Bruce, while no such aircraft entered into operational service as a result of competition from other aircraft to perform the role, a number of DH.4 seaplanes were produced for trial purposes at Felixstowe and were successfully flown.

== Operational history ==
=== British military service ===
The DH.4 entered service with the RFC in January 1917, first being used by No. 55 Squadron. More squadrons were equipped with the type to increase the bombing capacity of the RFC, with two squadrons re-equipping in May, and a total of six squadrons by the end of the year. During late 1917, the uptake of the type by the RFC was accelerated due to a desire to launch retaliatory bombing raids upon Germany following such attacks having been conducted against the British mainland. While Russia had been an early customer for the DH.4, having ordered 50 of the type in September 1917, the Russian and British governments subsequently agreed to delay the former's deliveries, instead diverting those aircraft to RFC squadrons in France.

As well as the RFC, the RNAS also used the DH.4. During the spring of 1917, No. 2 Squadron became the first unit of the service to receive examples of the type. The RNAS flew their DH.4s over both France and over Italy, specifically the Aegean front in the latter case. The DH.4 was typically used to conduct coastal patrols by the RNAS. One such flight, crewed by the pilot Major Egbert Cadbury and Captain Robert Leckie (later Air Vice-Marshal) as gunner, shot down Zeppelin L70 on 5 August 1918. In another incident, a group of four RNAS DH.4s were jointly credited with the sinking of the German U-boat UB 12 on 19 August 1918.

The DH.4 proved a huge success and was often considered the best single-engined bomber of World War I. (Note: Quote: "Certainly the DH.4 was without peer among the day-bombing aeroplanes used by the aerial forces of any of the combatant nations.") Even when fully loaded with bombs, with its reliability and impressive performance, the type proved highly popular with its crews. The Airco DH.4 was easy to fly, and especially when fitted with the Rolls-Royce Eagle engine, its speed and altitude performance gave it a good deal of invulnerability to German fighter interception, so that the DH.4 often did not require a fighter escort on missions, a concept furthered by de Havilland in the later Mosquito of the Second World War.

A drawback of the design was the distance between pilot and observer, as they were separated by the large main fuel tank. This made communication between the crew members difficult, especially in combat with enemy fighters. There was also some controversy (especially in American service) that this placement of the fuel tank was inherently unsafe. In fact, most contemporary aircraft were prone to catching fire in the air. (Note: Sometimes derided as the "Flaming Coffin," Gorrell's History of the Air Service of the AEF refuted the misconception. Quote: "Of 33 DH-4s lost to enemy action by the US Air Service, eight fell in flames- no worse than the average at the time.") The fire hazard was reduced, however, when the pressurised fuel system was replaced by one using wind-driven fuel pumps late in 1917, although this was not initially adopted by American-built aircraft. The otherwise inferior DH.9 brought the pilot and observer closer together by placing the fuel tank in the usual place, between the pilot and the engine.

Despite its success, numbers in service with the RFC actually started to decline from spring 1918, mainly due to a shortage of engines, and production switched to the DH.9, which turned out to be disappointing, being inferior to the DH.4 in most respects. It was left to the further developed DH.9A, with the American Liberty engine, to satisfactorily replace the DH.4.

When the Independent Air Force was set up in June 1918 to carry out strategic bombing of targets in Germany, the DH.4s of 55 Squadron formed part of it, being used for daylight attacks. 55 Squadron developed tactics of flying in wedge formations, bombing on the leader's command and with the massed defensive fire of the formation deterring attacks by enemy fighters. Despite heavy losses, 55 Squadron continued in operation, the only one of the day bombing squadrons in the Independent Force which did not have to temporarily stand down owing to aircrew losses.

After the Armistice, the RAF formed No. 2 Communication Squadron, equipped with DH.4s to carry important passengers to and from the Paris Peace Conference. Several of the DH.4s used for this purpose were modified with an enclosed cabin for two passengers at the request of Bonar Law. One of these planes was extensively used by Prime Minister David Lloyd George and was sometimes called Lloyd George's airplane - probably the first aeroplane widely used by a political leader. Modified aircraft were designated DH.4A, with at least seven being converted for the RAF, and a further nine for civil use.

=== United States military service ===
At the time of its entry into the war, the United States Army Air Service lacked any aircraft suitable for front line combat. It therefore procured various aircraft from the British and French, one being the DH.4. As the DH-4, it was manufactured mostly by Dayton-Wright and Fisher Body for service with the United States from 1918, the first American built DH-4 being delivered to France in May 1918, with combat operations commencing in August 1918. The powerplant was a 400 hp (300 kW) Liberty L-12 and it was fitted with two forward-firing .30 in (7.62 mm) synchronized Marlin-Rockwell M1917 (a development of the Colt-Browning) machine guns in the nose and two .30 in (7.62 mm) Lewis guns in the rear and could carry 322 lb (146 kg) of bombs. it could also be equipped with various radios like the SCR-68 for artillery spotting missions. The heavier engine reduced performance compared with the Rolls-Royce powered version, but as the "Liberty Plane" it became the US Army Air Service standard general purpose two-seater, and on the whole was fairly popular with its crews.

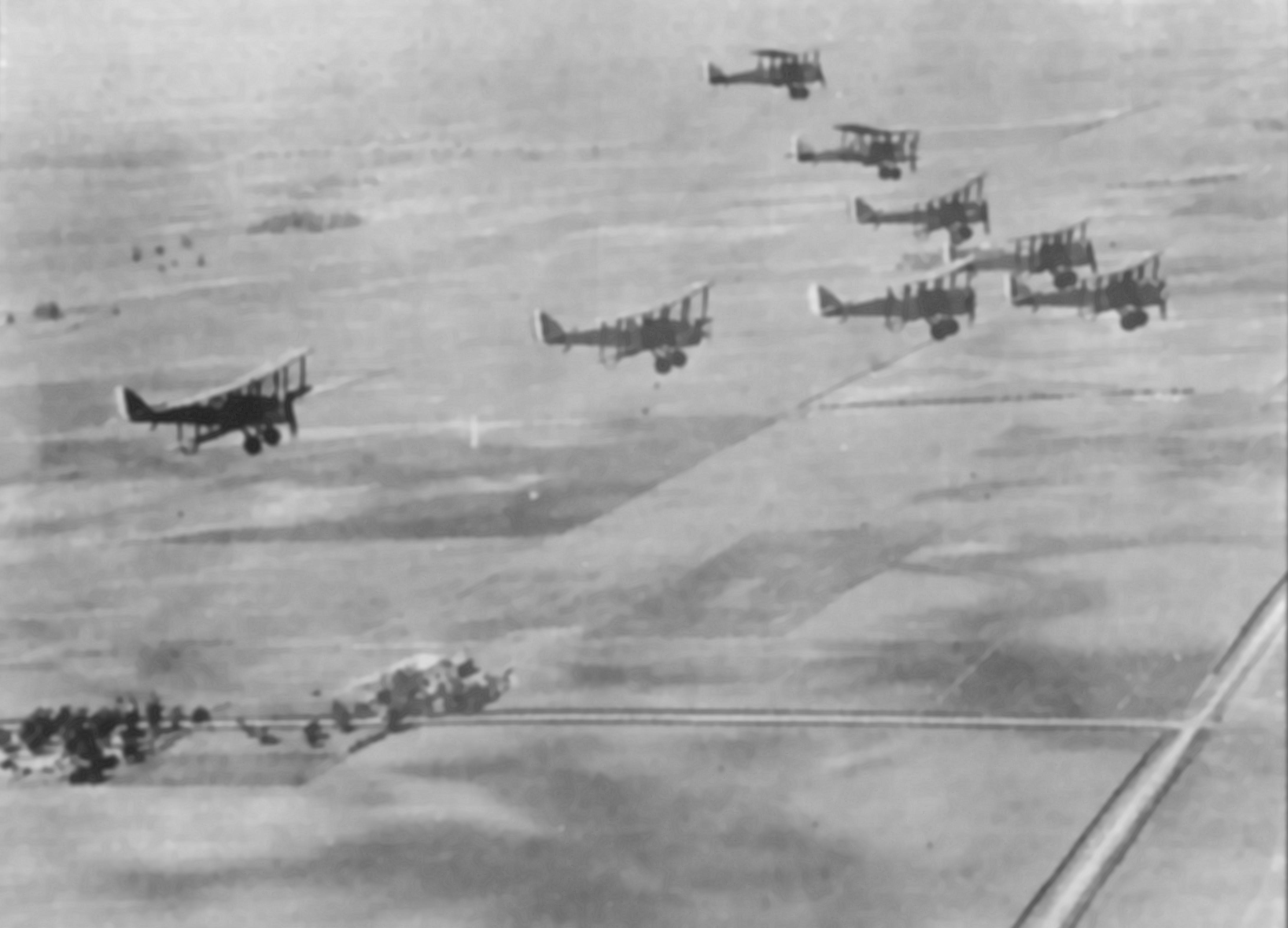
A formation of DH-4s in flight

Aircrew operating the DH-4 were awarded four of the six Medals of Honor awarded to American aviators. First Lieutenant Harold Ernest Goettler and Second Lieutenant Erwin R. Bleckley received posthumous awards after being killed on 12 October 1918 attempting to drop supplies to the Lost Battalion of the 77th Division, cut off by German troops during the Meuse-Argonne Offensive; while Second Lieutenant Ralph Talbot and Gunnery Sergeant Robert G. Robinson of the United States Marine Corps (USMC) were awarded the Medal of Honor for beating off attacks from 12 German fighters during a bombing raid over Belgium on 8 October 1918. The type flew with 13 U.S. squadrons by the end of 1918.

Following the end of the First World War, America had a large surplus of DH-4s, with the improved DH-4B becoming available, although none had been shipped to France. It was therefore decided that there was no point in returning aircraft across the Atlantic, so those remaining in France, together with other obsolete observation and trainer aircraft, were burned in what became known as the "Billion Dollar Bonfire". With limited funds available to develop and purchase replacements, the remaining DH-4s formed a major part of American air strength for several years, used for many roles, with as many as 60 variants produced. DH-4s were also widely used for experimental flying, being used as engine testbeds and fitted with new wings. They were used for the first trials of air-to-air refueling on 27 June 1923, and one carried out an endurance flight of 37 hours, 15 minutes on 27–28 August, being refueled 16 times and setting 16 new world records for distance, speed and duration. The DH-4 remained in service with the United States Army Air Corps, successor to the United States Army Air Service, until 1932.

A large number of DH-4s were also used by the United States Navy and United States Marine Corps, both during the First World War and postwar. The Navy and Marine Corps received a total of 51 DH-4s during wartime, followed by 172 DH-4B and DH-4B-1 aircraft postwar and 30 DH-4M-1s with welded steel-tube fuselages (redesignated O2B) in 1925. They remained in service with the Marine Corps until 1929, being used against rebel factions in Nicaragua in 1927, carrying out the first dive-bombing attacks made by U.S. military forces. The U.S. Navy converted some DH-4M-1s into primitive air ambulances that could carry one stretcher casualty in an enclosed area behind the pilot.

=== Civil use ===
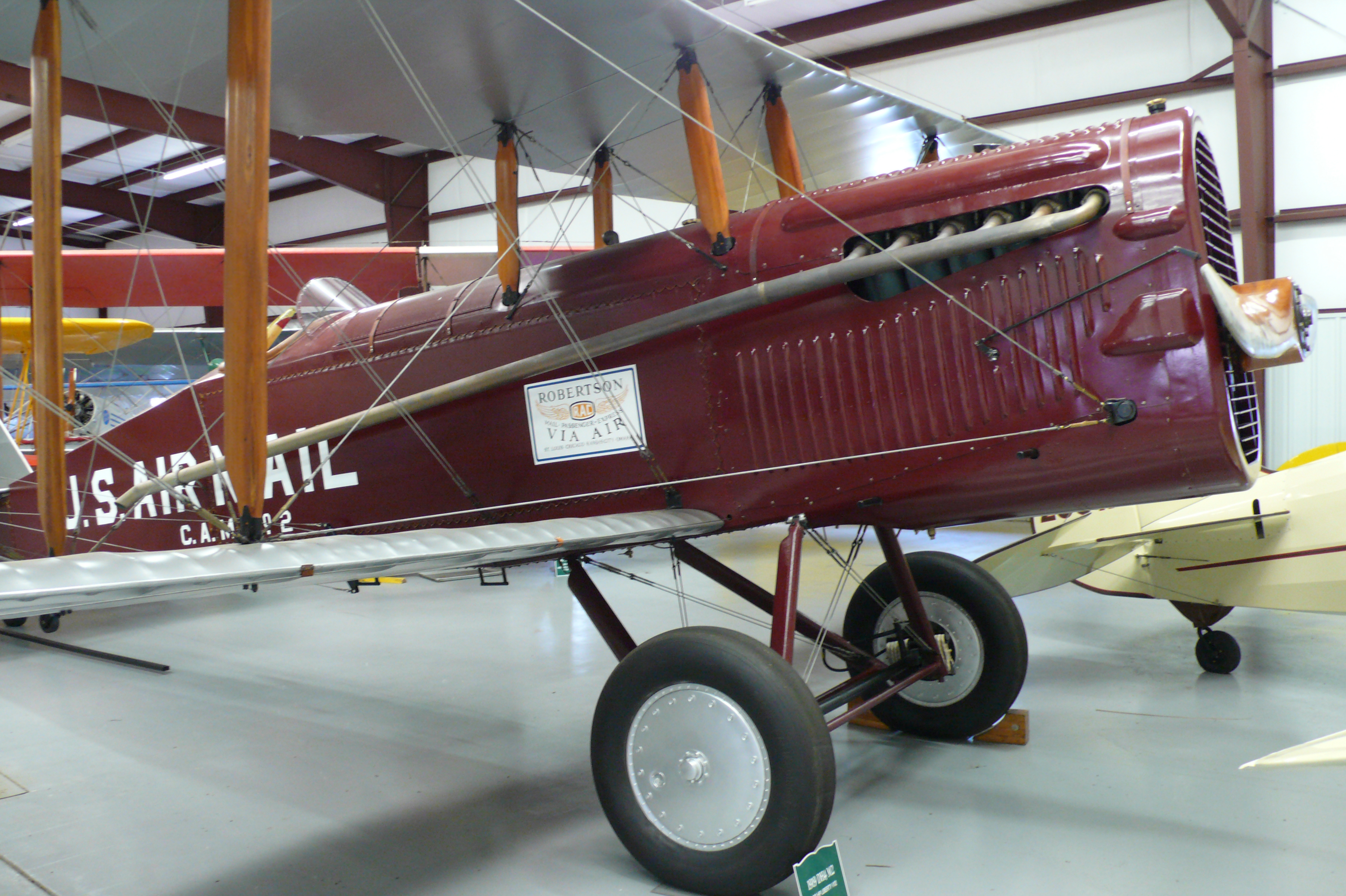
Robertson Aircraft Corp. operated DH-4 mailplane (CAM 2) 1926 at the Historic Aircraft Restoration Museum

Following the end of the First World War, large numbers of DH.4s and DH.4As were used to operate scheduled passenger services in Europe by such airlines as Aircraft Transport and Travel, Handley Page Transport and the Belgium airline SNETA. G-EAJC of Aircraft Transport and Travel flew the first British commercial passenger service from Hounslow Heath Aerodrome to Paris Le Bourget on 25 August 1919, carrying a reporter from the Evening Standard newspaper and a load of newspapers and other freight. They were used by Aircraft Transport and Travel until it shut down in 1920, while Handley Page Transport and SNETA continued operating the DH.4 until 1921. One aircraft was used by Instone Air Lines until its merger into Imperial Airways in 1924.

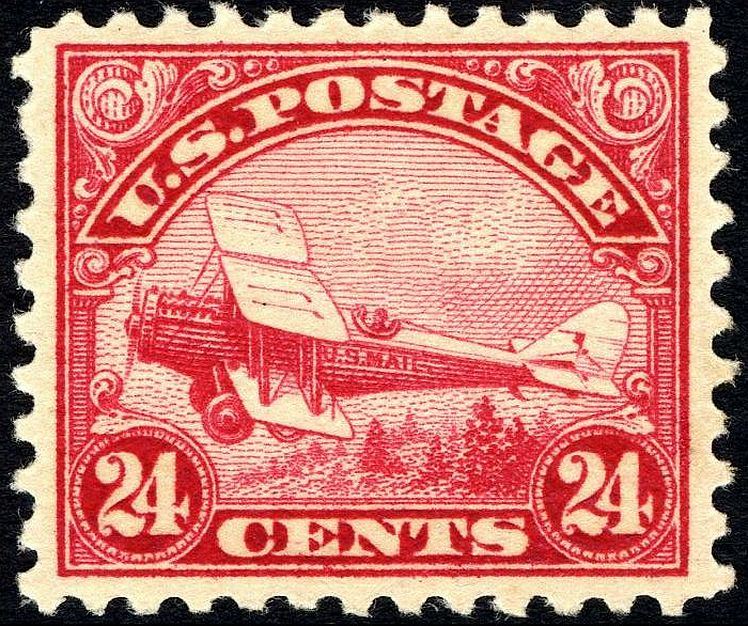
In 1923 the U.S. Post Office released a stamp featuring the DeHavilland Biplane being used for airmail service

On September 4, 1922, Jimmy Doolittle made the first cross-country flight, flying a de Havilland DH-4 – which was equipped with early navigational instruments – from Pablo Beach (now Jacksonville Beach), Florida, to Rockwell Field, San Diego, California, in 21 hours and 19 minutes, making only one refueling stop at Kelly Field.

The DH.4 were also used by the Australian airline QANTAS, flying its first airmail service in 1922. Twelve DH.4s forming part of the Imperial Gift to Canada were used for forestry patrol and survey work, spotting hundreds of forest fires and helping to save millions of dollars' worth of timber, with the last example finally being withdrawn in 1927.

The U.S. Post Office also adopted the DH-4 to carry air mail. The Service acquired 100 of them from the army in 1918, and retrofitted them to make them safer, denominating them as the DH.4B. In 1919, the DH-4B was standardised by the US Post Office, being modified to be flown from the rear cockpit with a 400 lb (180 kg) watertight mail compartment replacing the forward cockpit. The airmail DH-4B were later modified with revised landing gear and an enlarged rudder. DH-4s were used to establish a coast-to-coast, transcontinental airmail service, between San Francisco and New York, a distance of 2,680 mi (4,310 km), involving night flight, the first services starting on 21 August 1924. The DH-4 continued in Post Office service until 1927, when the last airmail routes were passed to private contractors.

War-surplus DH-4s were available cheaply in sufficient quantities to stimulate the development of "utility aviation": surveying, commercial photography, law enforcement, agricultural applications and other practical applications.

== Variants ==
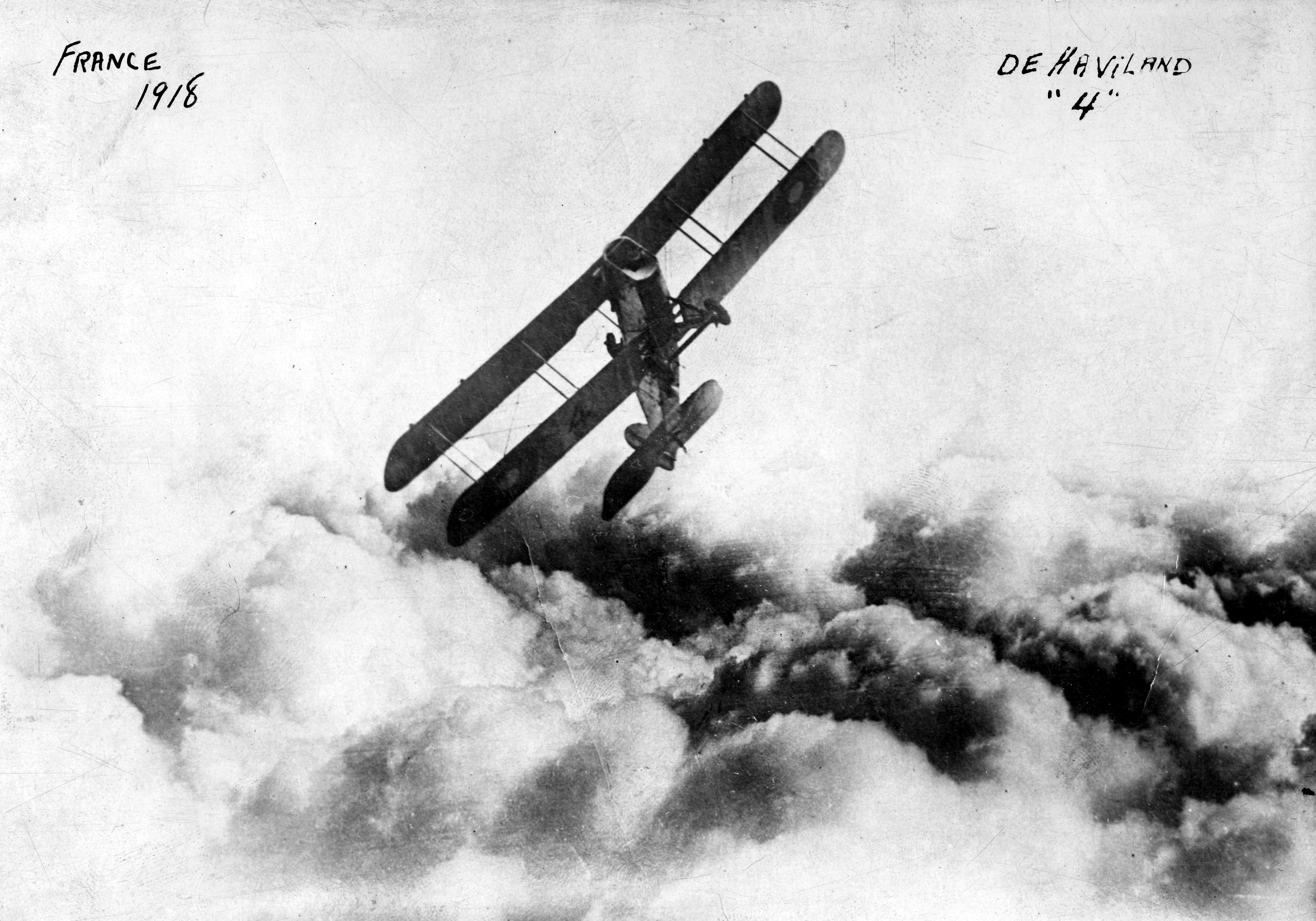
DH-4 soaring above the clouds in France

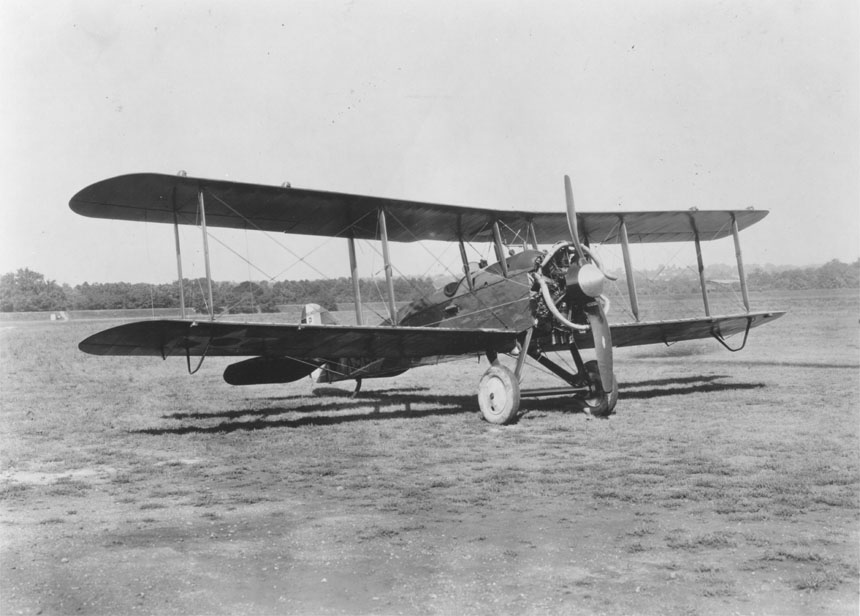
Wright Radial Engine (R-1) fitted to a De Havilland DH-4B airframe

=== UK variants ===
- DH.4 : Two-seat day bomber biplane.
- DH.4A : Transport version. Built in the United Kingdom. Two passengers in glazed cabin behind pilot.
- DH.4R : Single seat racer – 450 hp (340 kW) Napier Lion engine.

=== Soviet variants ===
- copy of DH.4 manufactured by Polikarpov in the former Dux Factory in the 1920s

=== United States variants ===
- DH-4 : Two-seat day bomber biplane, built in the United States.
- DH-4A : Civil version, built in the United States.
- DH-4B : Rebuilt version of Liberty powered DH-4 for U.S. Air Service. Pilot's cockpit relocated to behind fuel tank, adjacent to observer's cockpit.
    - DH-4B-1 : Increased fuel capacity (110 US gal (420 L; 92 imp gal)).
    - DH-4B-2 : Trainer version.
    - DH-4B-3 : Fitted with 135 US gal (510 L; 112 imp gal) fuel tank
    - DH-4B-4 : Civil version
    - DH-4B-5 : Experimental civil conversion with enclosed cabin.
  - DH-4BD :Cropdusting version of DH-4B
  - DH-4BG : Fitted with smokescreen generators
  - DH-4BK : Night flying version
  - DH-4BM: Single seat version for communications
    - DH-4BM-1 : Dual control version of BM
    - DH-4BM-2 : Dual control version of BM
  - DH-4-BP : Experimental photo reconnaissance version
    - DH-4-BP-1 : BP converted for survey work
  - DH-4BS : Testbed for supercharged Liberty
  - DH-4BT : Dual control trainer
  - DH-4BW : Testbed for Wright H engine
- DH-4C : 300 hp (220 kW) Packard engine
- DH-4L : Civil version
- DH-4M : Rebuilt version of DH-4 with steel tube fuselage.
- DH-4Amb : Ambulance.
- DH-4M-1 – postwar version by Boeing (Model 16) with new fuselage, designated O2B-1 by Navy
  - DH-4M-1T – Dual control trainer conversion of DH-4M
  - DH-4M-1K – target tug conversion
  - O2B-2 – cross-country and night flying conversion for Navy
- DH-4M-2 – postwar version by Atlantic
- L.W.F. J-2 – Twin-engine long range development of DH-4 (also known as Twin DH), powered by two 200 hp (150 kW) Hall-Scott-Liberty L-6 engines and with wingspan of 52 ft 6 in (16.00 m); 20 built for U.S. Post Office, 10 for U.S. Army.

XCO-7
(Boeing Model 42) Two-seat observation version with Boeing designed wings, enlarged tailplane and divided landing gear.

XCO-8
Was a designation of one Atlantic DH.4M-2 fitted with Loening COA-1 wings and powered by a Liberty 12A engine.

== Operators ==
=== Civil operators ===
Argentina

- The River Plate Aviation Co. Ltd.

Australia

- QANTAS

Belgium

- SNETA

United Kingdom

- Aircraft Transport and Travel Limited
- Handley Page Transport
- Imperial Airways
- Instone Air Line

United States

- U.S. Post Office

=== Military operators ===
Belgium

- Aviation Militaire Belge

Canada

- Canadian Air Force (1918–1920)
- Royal Canadian Air Force

Chile

- Chilean Air Force

Cuba

- Cuban Air Force – American built DH-4s

Greece

- Hellenic Air Force
- Hellenic Navy

Iran

- Imperial Iranian Air Force

Mexico

- Fuerza Aérea Mexicana

Nicaragua

- Nicaraguan Air Force – The Nicaragua Air Force received seven DH-4Bs.

New Zealand

- The New Zealand Permanent Air Force operated two aircraft from 1919 to 1929. It was used by the NZPAF as an advanced training aircraft. The DH.4 has the distinction of being the first aircraft to fly over Mount Cook on 8 September 1920. It also set a New Zealand altitude record of 21,000 ft (6,400 m) on 27 November 1919.

South Africa

- South African Air Force

Soviet Union

- Soviet Air Force

Kingdom of Spain

- Spanish Air Force

Turkey

- Turkish Air Force

United Kingdom

- Royal Flying Corps
- Royal Air Force
- Royal Naval Air Service

United States

- United States Army Air Service
  - 8th Aero Squadron
  - 11th Aero Squadron
  - 20th Aero Squadron
  - 50th Aero Squadron
  - 85th Aero Squadron
  - 91st Aero Squadron
  - 104th Aero Squadron
  - 135th Aero Squadron
  - 163rd Aero Squadron
  - 166th Aero Squadron
  - 168th Aero Squadron
  - 278th Aero Squadron
  - 354th Aero Squadron
- United States Navy
- United States Marine Corps

== Surviving aircraft ==
DH-4:

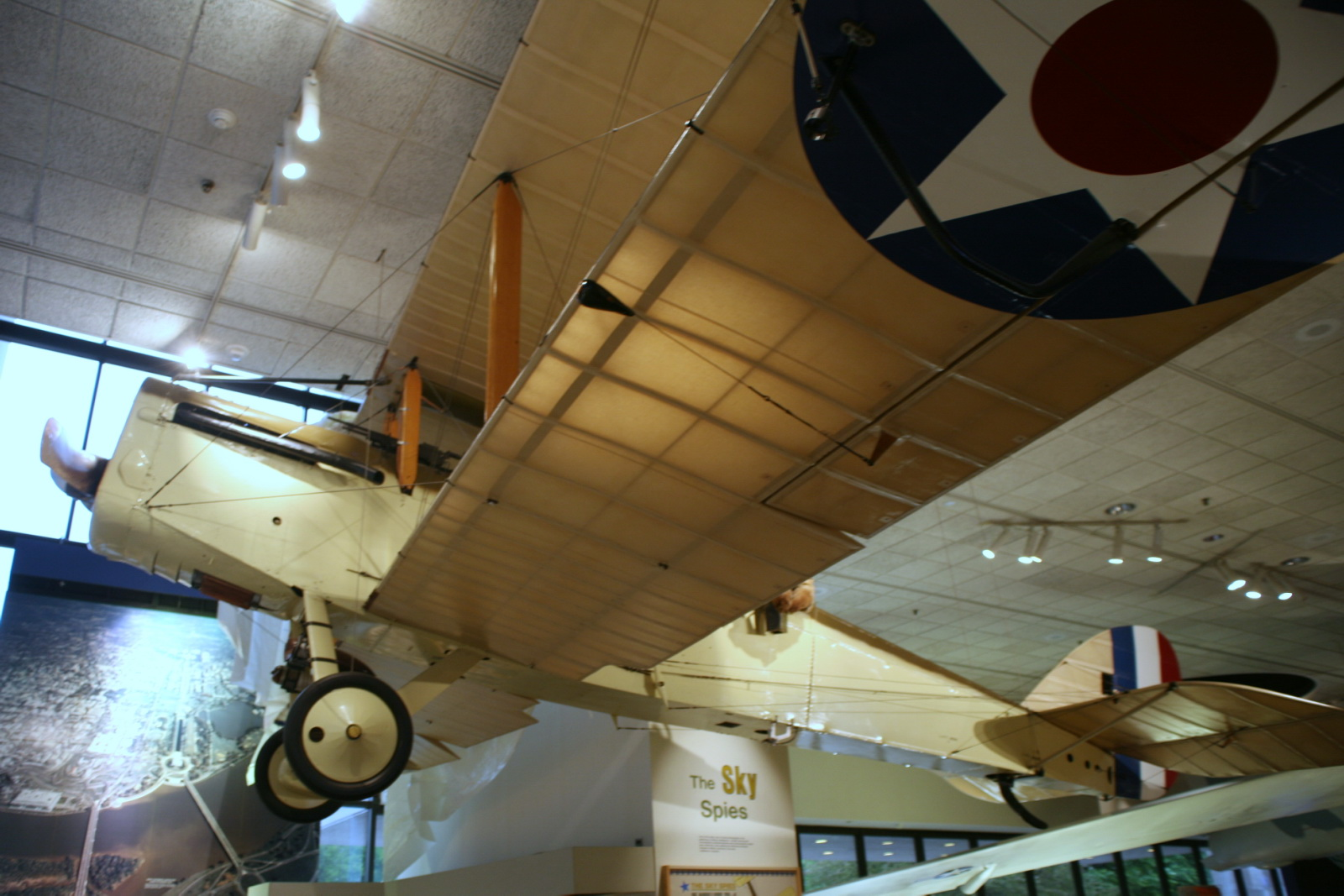
The DH-4B on display at the National Museum of the United States Air Force

- 21959 – The prototype American-built DH-4 is on display at the National Air and Space Museum in Washington D.C.
- Unknown ID – A DH-4 is on display at the National Museum of the Marine Corps in Triangle, Virginia. It was restored by Century Aviation.
- 32517 - A DH-4 is currently being reconstructed so it can be permanently displayed at a public venue in Wichita, Kansas. It will commemorate United States Army aviator Erwin R. Bleckley, who was killed in action during World War I while flying a DH-4 near the "lost battalion" in France.
- Unknown ID – A DH-4 is on display at the Omaka Aviation Heritage Centre in Blenheim, New Zealand. This aircraft was previously on display at the Crawford Auto-Aviation Museum in Cleveland, Ohio and was at one point loaned to the United States Air Force Museum.
- Replica – A DH.4 is airworthy with The Vintage Aviator Limited in Masterton, New Zealand. It was built by Century Aviation and is powered by a rebuilt Liberty V-12.
- Replica – A DH-4 is on display at the Museo del Aire in Madrid, Spain.

DH-4B:

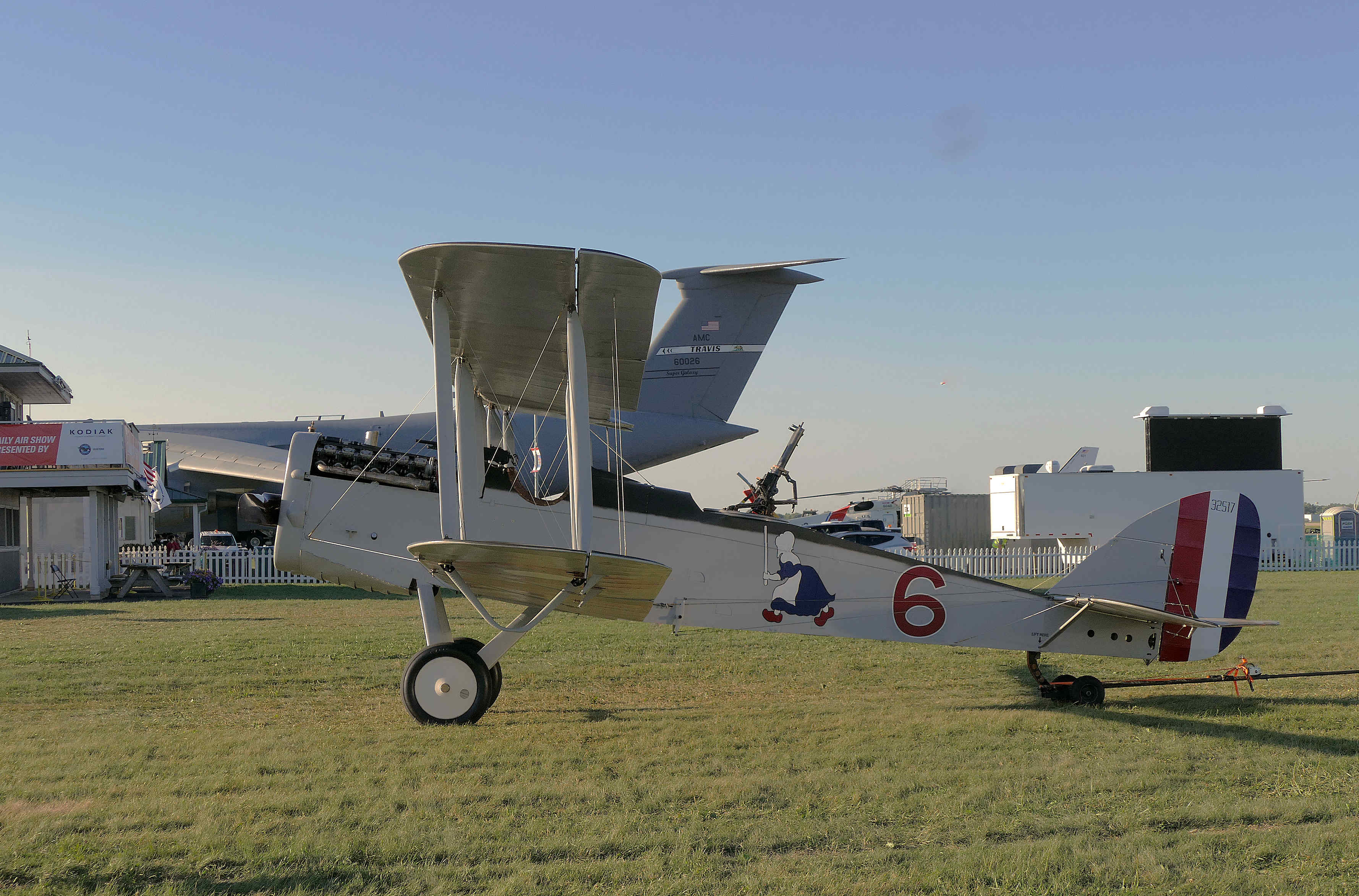
Friends of Jenny DH.4, 2018

- Unknown ID – A DH-4B is on display in the main atrium of the National Postal Museum in Washington, D.C.
- Unknown ID – A DH-4B at the Pearson Air Museum in Vancouver, Washington. It was restored by Century Aviation.
- Unknown ID – A DH-4B is on display at the National Museum of the United States Air Force in Dayton, Ohio. It was restored by Century Aviation.
- Unknown ID – A DH-4B is on display at Fantasy of Flight in Polk City, Florida. It was restored by Century Aviation.
- Unknown ID – A DH-4B is under restoration by Century Aviation for Fantasy of Flight in Polk City, Florida. It will be powered by a rebuilt Liberty V-12.

DH-4M-1

- Unknown ID – A DH-4M-1 is on display at the Evergreen Aviation and Space Museum in McMinnville, Oregon. This aircraft was previously owned by Paul Mantz.

DH-4M-2A

- Unknown ID – A DH-4M-2A is airworthy at the Historic Aircraft Restoration Museum in Maryland Heights, Missouri.

== Specifications (DH.4 – Eagle VIII engine) ==
Data from The British Bomber since 1914, The de Havilland DH.4

General characteristics

- Crew: 2
- Length: 30 ft 8 in (9.35 m)
- Wingspan: 43 ft 4 in (13.21 m)
- Height: 11 ft 0 in (3.35 m)
- Wing area: 434 sq ft (40.3 m^{2})
- Empty weight: 2,387 lb (1,083 kg)
- Gross weight: 3,472 lb (1,575 kg)
- Powerplant: 1 × Rolls-Royce Eagle VIII water-cooled V12 engine, 375 hp (280 kW) (Note: 230 hp (170 kW) for BHP Puma)

Performance

- Maximum speed: 143 mph (230 km/h, 124 kn) at sea level (Note: 106 mph (171 km/h) for Puma engine variants)
- Endurance: 3 hr 45 min
- Service ceiling: 22,000 ft (6,700 m)
- Time to altitude: 9 min to 10,000 ft (3,000 m)

Armament

- Guns: One fixed forward-firing .303 in (7.7 mm) Vickers machine gun, 1 or 2 .303 in (7.7 mm) Lewis guns on a Scarff ring
- Bombs: 460 lb (210 kg) of bombs

== See also ==
- 1916 in aviation

Related development

- Airco DH.9
- Airco DH.9A

Related lists

- List of bomber aircraft
