= Dorothée Pullinger =

British pioneering automobile engineer and businesswoman

Dorothée Aurélie Marianne Pullinger
- Born: 13 January 1894; Saint-Aubin-sur-Scie, Seine Inférieure, France
- Died: 28 January 1986 (aged 92); St Peter Port, Guernsey, Channel Islands
- Awards: MBE
- Scientific career
- Fields: Automobile engineer and businesswoman
- Institutions: Arrol-Johnston; Vickers; White Service Laundries Ltd; Normandy Laundries

Dorothée Aurélie Marianne Pullinger, MBE (13 January 1894 – 28 January 1986) was a pioneering automobile engineer and businesswoman.

== Early life ==
Born in Saint-Aubin-sur-Scie, Seine Inférieure, France, she was the eldest of the 11 children of engineer Thomas Charles Pullinger (1867–1945) and Aurélie Bérénice, née Sittwel (1871–1956). She was educated at Loughborough High School after the family moved to the UK when she was eight. The family settled in Swinlees farm, just outside Dalry, Ayrshire, where she created a sketchbook of drawings and simple paintings of the area. In 1910, she began work as a draftsperson at the Paisley works of Arrol-Johnston, the oldest and largest Scottish car manufacturer at that time. Her father, a well-known car designer, was managing director of the firm.

== World War I and munitions manufacturing ==
Pullinger remained at Arrol-Johnston until the start of World War I when the firm changed from producing cars to aeroplanes. She was appointed female supervisor of the large munitions facility operated by Vickers in Barrow-in-Furness, where women were employed in the manufacture of high explosive shells. Her fluency in both English and French enabled her to manage the workforce of around 7,000, some of whom were Belgian and French refugees. In 1916, her father created a new munitions facility at Arrol-Johnston near Kirkcudbright which included an engineering college for women and an apprenticeship program.

== Galloway Motors and automobile manufacturing ==
After the war, she returned to Scotland where the munitions facility was converted back to the manufacture of automobiles. It was renamed Galloway Motors Ltd and Pullinger was its director and manager. The company produced a car, the Galloway, for Arrol-Johnston that was designed for women. The company employed a largely female work force under Pullinger's direction and produced automobiles until 1923 when production was transferred to Arrol-Johnston's Heathhall works.

In January 1921 Pullinger was elected as the first female Member of the Institution of Automobile Engineers. She had initially rejected the Institution's offer of Associate Membership. She was an enthusiastic race car driver and won the cup in the Scottish Six Day Car Trials in 1924. She acted as a sales representative for Arrol-Johnston from 1925–6.

== Marriage and later life ==
In 1924, Pullinger married Edward Marshall Martin (1895–1951), a ship's purser on the P&O passenger liner SS Naldera. They married in the Dumfries Catholic Apostolic church, to which the family belonged. They had two children, Yvette (b.1926) and Lewis (1931–2021). In the late 1920s, Pullinger and her husband established White Service Steam Laundry Ltd in Croydon which expanded to 17 shops where American steam laundry equipment was installed. They sold the company in 1946.

During World War II, she was the only woman appointed to the Industrial Panel of the Ministry of Production. As a member of the Conservative and Unionist Party, she served on a panel to address post-war problems, contributing to the 1944 report Looking Ahead: Work and the Future of British Industry.

In 1947, she moved to Guernsey where she established Normandy Laundries in 1950. The laundry company is still in existence.

Later in life she continued drive one of her Galloway cars around Guernsey, with apparent reckless disregard for the Highway Code, as related by a Guernsey writer George Torode, who knew her.

She died in Guernsey on 28 January 1986.

In 2012 she was inducted into the Scottish Engineering Hall of Fame.

== Significant achievements ==
- One of the founding members of the Women's Engineering Society in 1919, a life-long member and active in the Society's Council.
- MBE awarded in 1920 for her work as a manager during World War I at Vickers munitions production, overseeing 7000 women munitions workers.

== Commemoration ==
An exhibition about Dorothée Pullinger, including a Galloway coupe car dating from 1924, opened at the Riverside Museum in Glasgow in June 2019, as part of the Centenary celebrations for the Women's Engineering Society. The opening was attended by her daughter Yvette Le Couvey.

An exhibition about Pullinger and her life was held at the Devil's Porridge Museum in Eastriggs, Dumfries and Galloway in 2021.

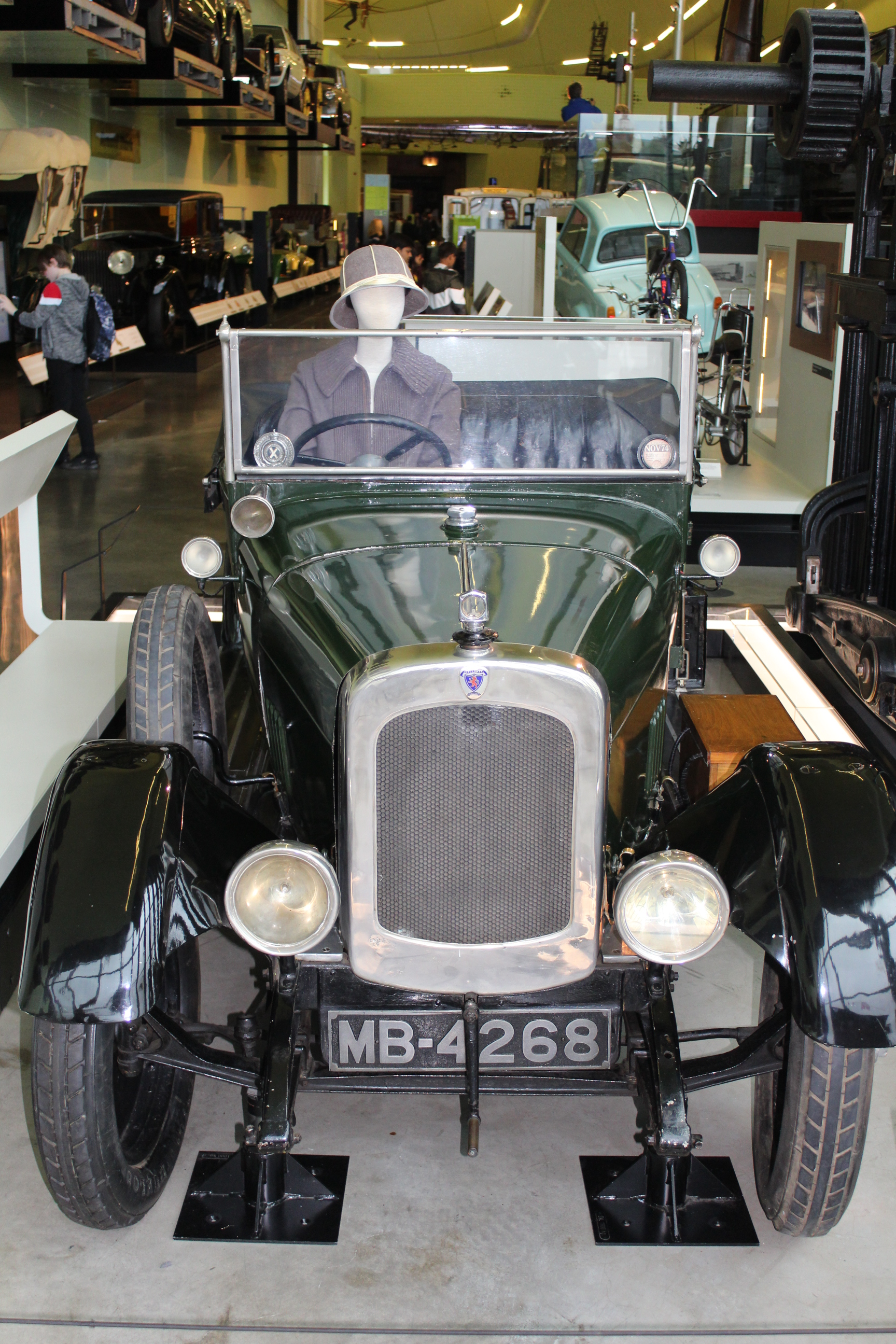
Driving Force- Dorothee Pullinger and the Galloway Car display at Riverside Museum
