= Torode (surname) =

Torode is a surname occurring in the English-speaking world. Notable people with the surname include:

- George Torode (1946–2010), Guernsey author, comedian and radio host
- John Torode (born 1965), Australian-British celebrity chef and TV presenter
- Mike Torode (1940 or 1941–2024), Guernsey politician
