= George Johnston (engineer) =

Scottish engineer

- Born: 1855; West Linton, Peeblesshire, Scotland
- Died: 1945 (aged 89–90)
- Citizenship: United Kingdom
- Parent: Reverend James Johnston
- Engineering career
- Institutions: Royal Philosophical Society of Glasgow

George Johnston (1855–1945) was a Scottish engineer. He was the son of the Reverend James Johnston, of Springburn's United Presbyterian Church. George spent the early part of his career in locomotive engineering before designing and constructing Scotland's first automobile, the Mo-Car, which led to the formation of the Arrol-Johnston Car Company Ltd.

== Career ==
=== Locomotives and trams ===
George Johnston worked as a locomotive engineer for Neilson, Reid and Company's Hyde Park Works of Springburn, Glasgow. In 1894 Johnston was commissioned by Glasgow Corporation to build an experimental steam tram-car to replace the horse trams. When it was having a final test before a Corporation committee it took fire and it was abandoned.

=== Motor cars ===
Johnston's attention was then turned to a detailed examination of continental makes of motor car. He came to the conclusion that he could design and make a better vehicle than any of them and in particular a better engine. The first British-built motor car was thus conceived and by the end of 1895 was ready for financial backing.

=== Mo-Car Syndicate ===
In the autumn of 1895 Johnston was joined by his cousin Norman Osborne Fulton and T. Blackwood Murray, former Works Manager with Mavor and Coulson, makers of mining machinery in Bridgeton. and Johnston formed a joint venture with Sir William Arrol, an engineer of the Forth Bridge to form the Mo-Car Syndicate Limited, which was to produce his car. Sir William was Chairman and Johnston was Managing Director, and the Syndicate included a Mr. Archibald Coats, and a Mr. Millar of Paisley, while his cousin Norman Fulton was Works Manager. Sir William's main interest in the business was as the financial backer. Fulton and Murray later parted company with Johnston in 1899 to set up Albion Motors.

=== All British Car Company ===
Johnston departed the Arrol-Johnston company in 1903 after it had been restructured financially, as a result of a disagreement, to join the All British Car Company.
