= All-British Car Company =

The All-British Car Company was a Scottish automobile manufacturer based at Bridgeton, Glasgow, from 1906 to 1908. The company was founded by George Johnston, formerly of Arrol-Johnston, primarily for the manufacture of a 54 horsepower eight-cylinder car with its cylinders arranged as two parallel fours. The pistons were actuated by two rocking beams which were driven by connecting rods from a normal four-throw crankshaft - a variation on the U engine. The unit was more complex than was necessary, and only a dozen All-British cars were ever completed.

== See also ==
- Arrol-Johnston
