= Thomas Pullinger =

Automobile engineer (1867 – 1945)

Thomas Charles Willis Pullinger CBE OBE OBK JP (1867 – July 1945) was a British automobile engineer. He began his career working with bicycles before the first cars were built. After working for Sunbeam and Humber, he helped expand the Scottish works of Arrol-Johnston, where he developed structured apprenticeship programmes and an engineering college for women.

== Early career ==
Eldest son of Fleet Paymaster Thomas Penford Pullinger, RN and his wife born Marianne Willis, he was born in Dartford, Kent, and while living in Bexley attended Dartford Grammar School, and was then apprenticed to long-established Dartford engineers, J & E Hall. On one side of his family he had Jersey French ancestry.

Following a stretch as a draughtsman at Woolwich Arsenal, he repaired then manufactured, most likely by assembling bought-in components, bicycles at New Cross and then in 1891 (while living in Bolt Street, Deptford) was sent by Humber to France for Humber's joint venture with the Gladiator Cycle Company. But Humber encountered difficulties and Pullinger stayed in France with Alexandre Darracq as Darracq's designer and personal assistant. He moved on as works manager to other French firms designing for Duncan and Superbie near Paris at Croissy perhaps the first small car. A 2-seater, it had a 2-cylinder horizontal engine, 2-speeds with friction clutches and a tubular frame. Duncan and Superbie built motorcycles under licence from Hildebrand & Wolfmüller. At Teste & Moret of Lyon in 1896 he used a 2¼ horsepower de Dion engine to build a car he named La Mouche or The Fly. To solve the cooling problems of high-speed air-cooled engines he designed the first water-cooled cylinder head and many were bought by de Dion Bouton. Pullinger was particularly interested in the kind of cars built on the opposite side of Lyon by a Marius Berliet at Audibert & Lavirotte

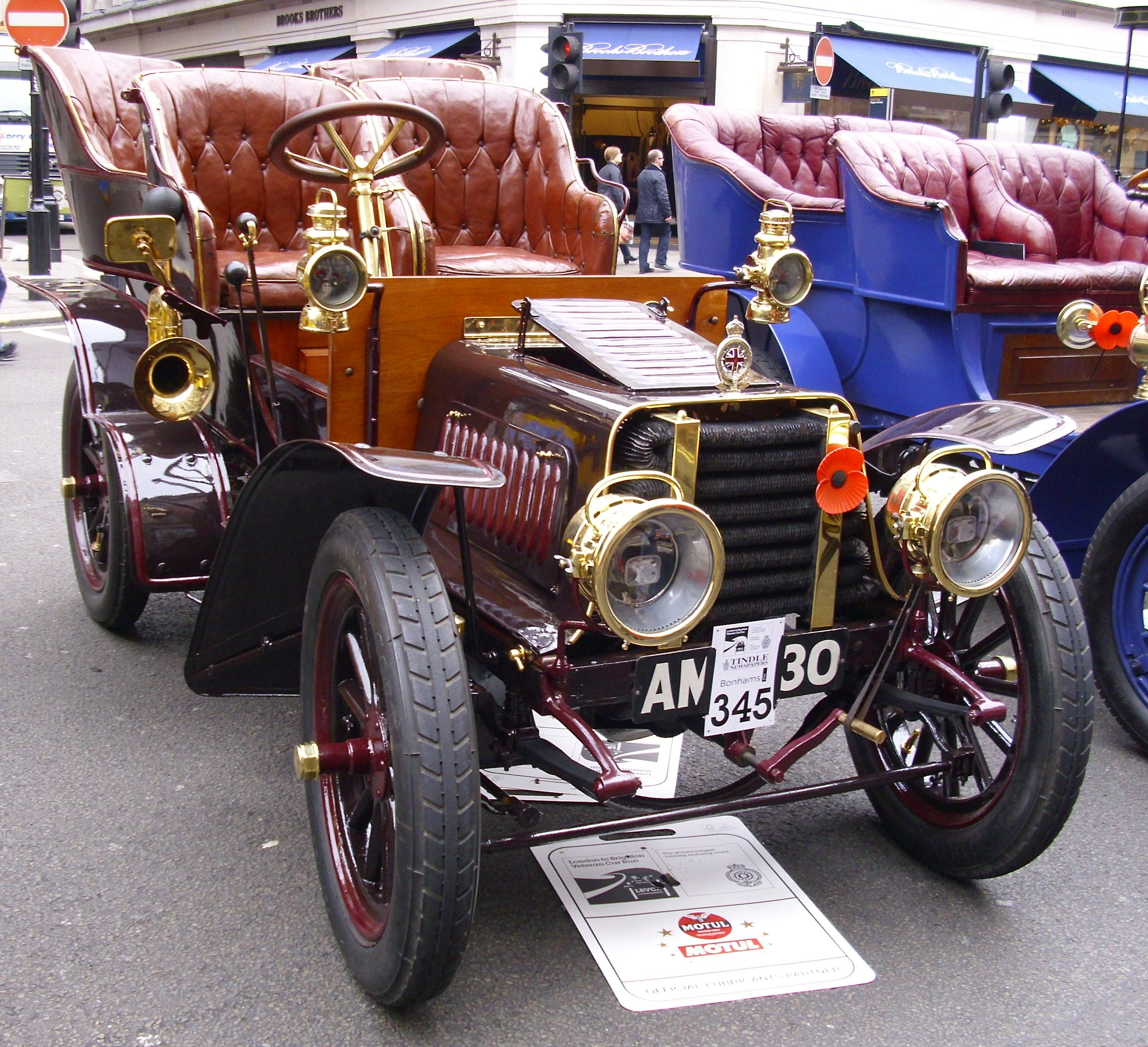
1903 Sunbeam 12 (Berliet)

Keen to design and build his own car, he moved back to England seeing more opportunity there than in France, and arrived at the Sunbeam Motor Car Company in Wolverhampton, Staffordshire on a motor-quadricycle he had built himself. He prepared a report for the Sunbeam directors and delivered it on 11 November 1902. He recommended that Sunbeam should buy in a car from an established firm then, as sales built up, buying them without certain components which would instead be made by Sunbeam until all that was bought in would be an engine. At the close of his report he recommended the cars be bought from Berliet in Lyon.

He left Sunbeam before the formation of the separate car company in 1904, taking up an appointment of general manager at Humber's Beeston, Nottinghamshire works. Humber's Beeston Works closed and operations transferred to their more modern Coventry factory.

== Arrol-Johnston ==
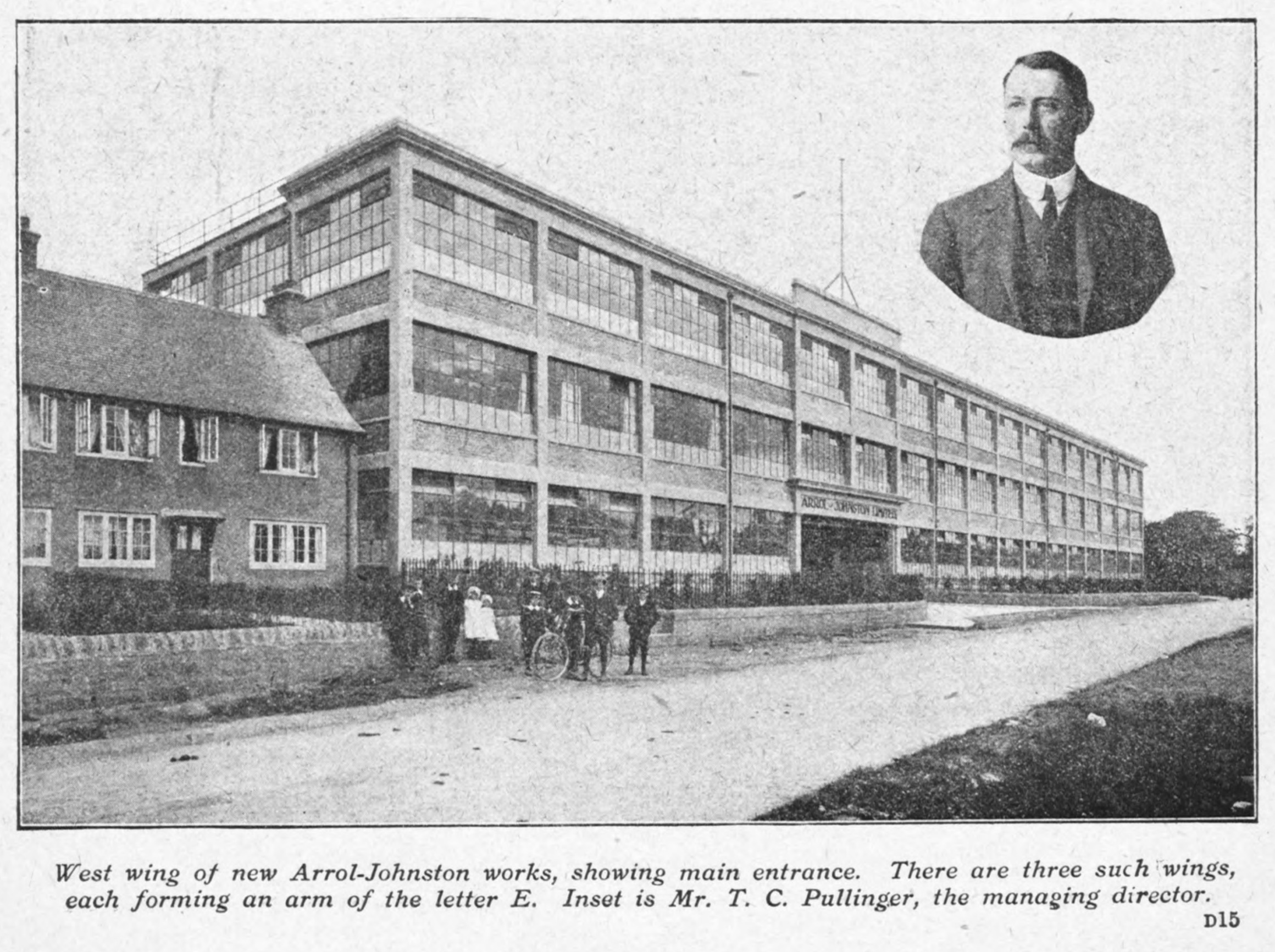
Part of the new works at Heathhall, Dumfries, 1913 and a portrait of Thomas Pullinger

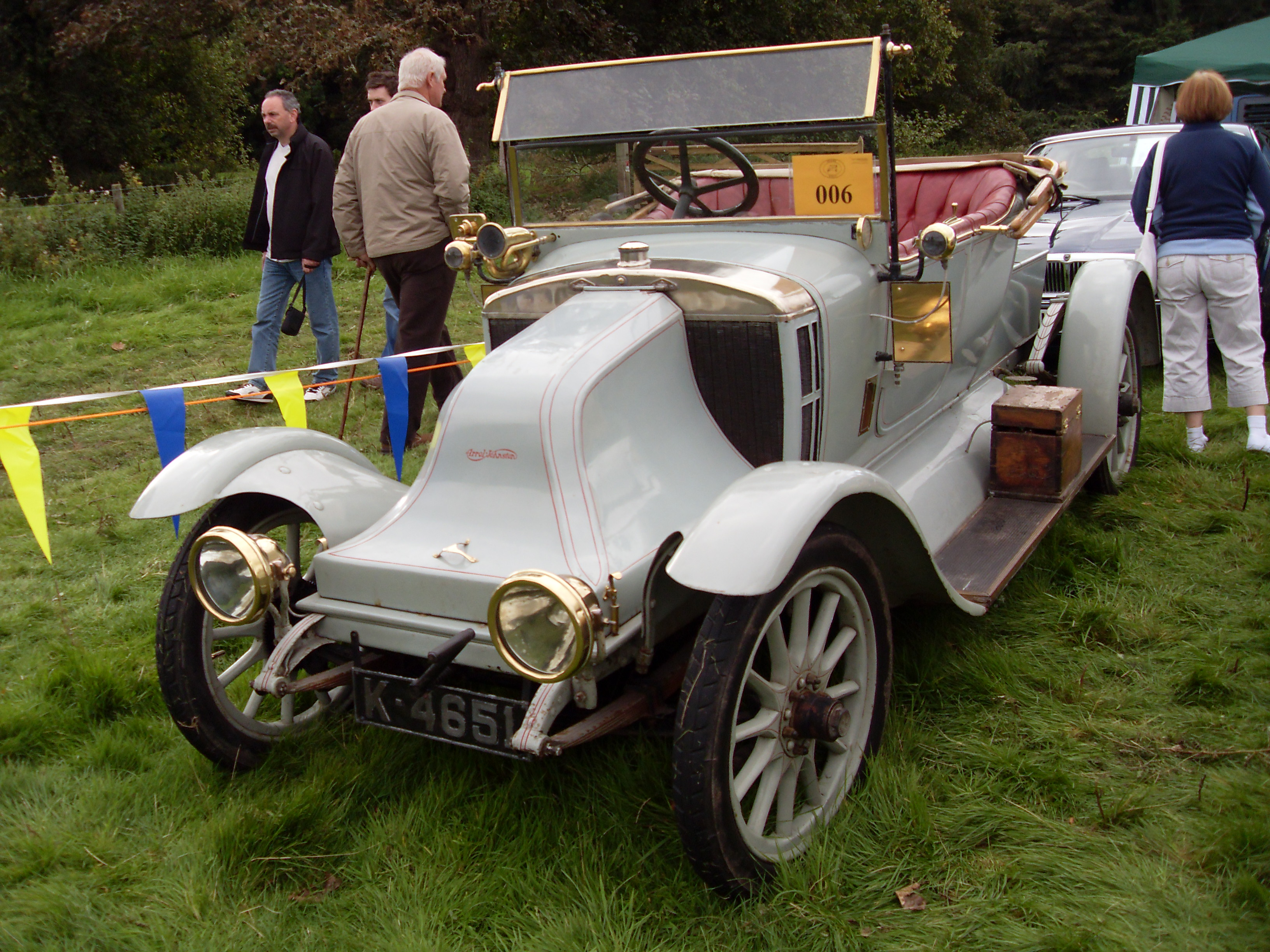
1914 Arrol-Johnston 11.9

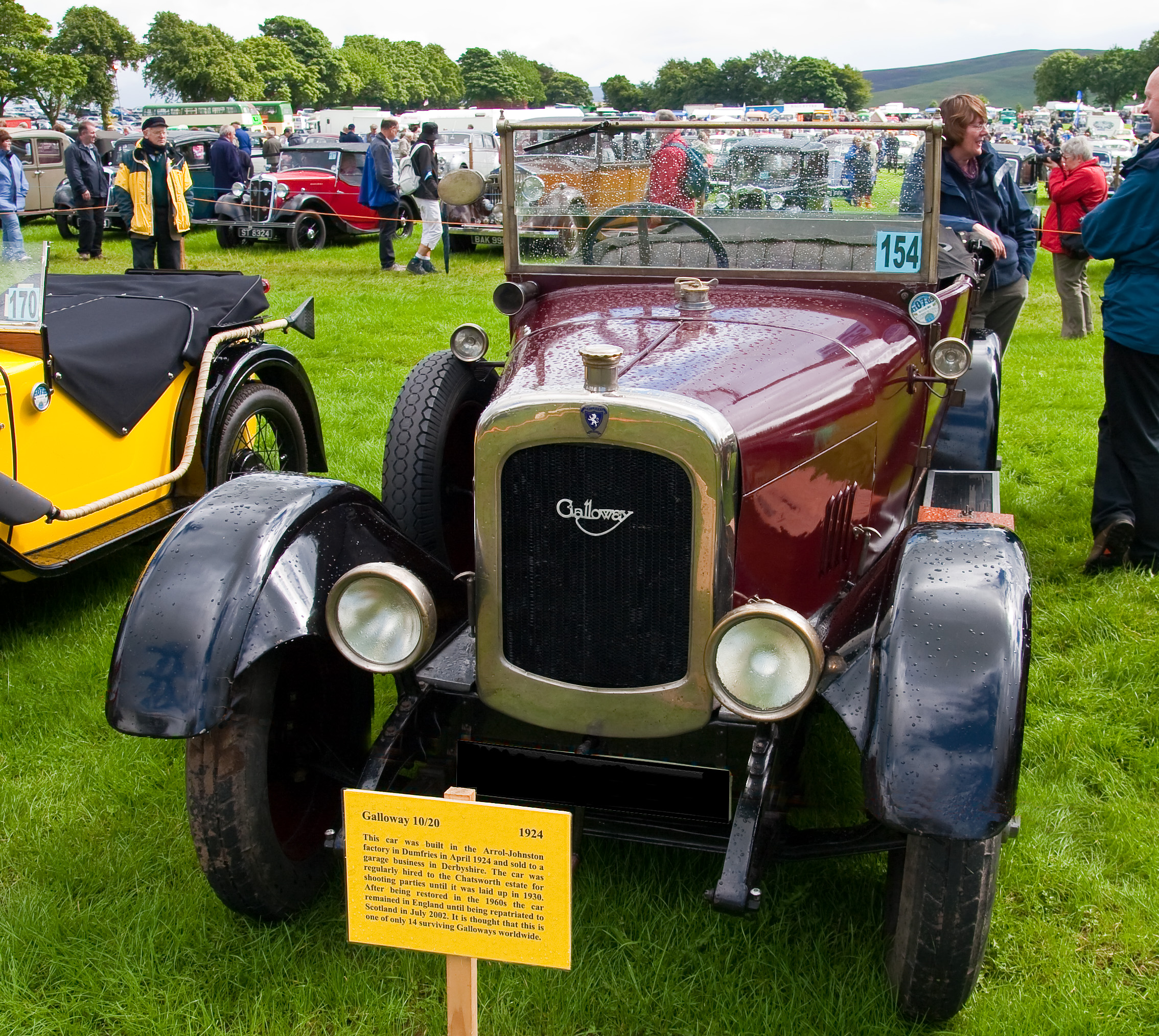
1924 Galloway 10–20 designed by Pullinger

In 1910 he was taken on by William Beardmore, 1st Baron Invernairn, businessman and shipbuilder, as manager of the Paisley works of his Arrol-Johnston Car Company Limited. Pullinger and his large family settled in Swinlees farm, just outside Dalry, Ayrshire, where their eldest child Dorothée created a sketchbook of drawings and simple paintings of the area.

He travelled to the USA to research mass production methods and car factory design, resulting in the erection of a new steel reinforced concrete and glass factory for Arrol-Johnston at Heathhall, Dumfries. This is believed to be the first building of its kind in Britain. It was designed by Albert Kahn, architect of the Ford factory at Highland Park, Michigan.

He oversaw a second new factory at Kirkcudbright in 1916 which was conceived as an engineering college for young ladies (see Dorothée Pullinger) with a structured apprenticeship system building aero engine components for the Heathhall Dumfries Works. Following the end of the war the factory switched to the manufacture of Galloway cars, Arrol-Johnston cars but in a medium price range.

During the First World War Thomas Pullinger carried out design proposals made by Frank Halford to create the Beardmore Halford Pullinger aero engine used in many wartime aircraft and later developed into the Siddeley Puma.

He seems to have remained with Beardmore's businesses until his retirement. Beardmore died in 1937.

== Personal life ==
On retirement he lived at The Brae, La Route des Genets, in the parish of St Brelade, Jersey and described his recreations as farming and yachting. He died in July 1945 at a hospital in London's Kensington while still reported to be living in the island of Jersey. The family were Catholic Apostolics and are buried in St Brelade's Church cemetery, Jersey.

In 1893 Pullinger married Aurélie Bérénice Sittwel (1871–1956) and they had four sons and six daughters, the eldest being Dorothée Pullinger, a pioneering automobile engineer and businesswoman.

Pullinger and Sittwel are the great-great grandparents of HM Solicitor General of Jersey Victoria Bell KC.
