= Galloway (car) =

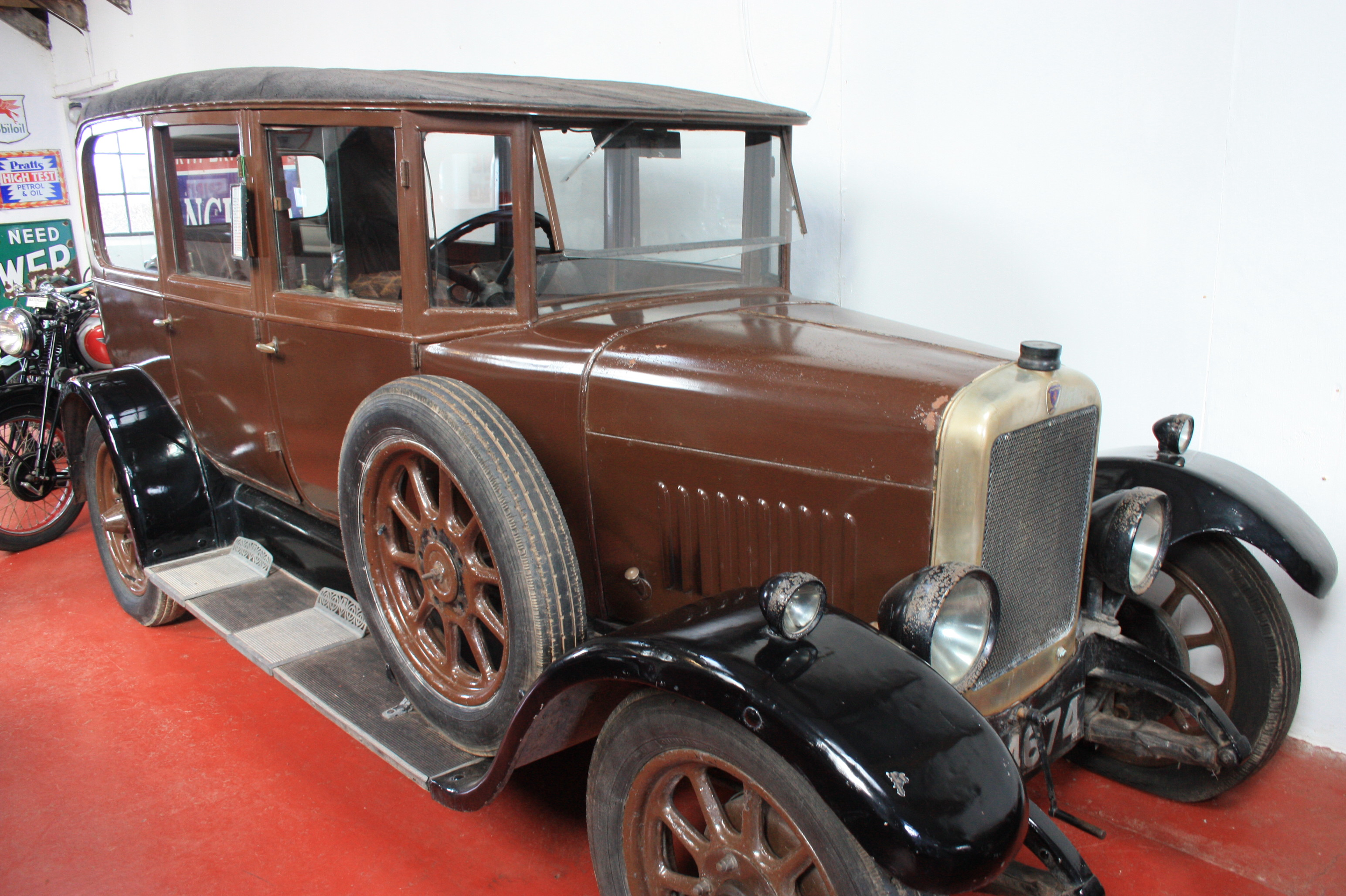
Dr Snoddie's 1927 1.5 litre Galloway from Dr. Finlay's Casebook, now at Myreton Motor Museum

Galloway was a Scottish car maker founded in 1920 as a subsidiary company to Arrol-Johnston. It was based at first at Tongland, Kirkcudbrightshire, and from 1923 at Heathall, Dumfries. It closed in 1928.

== History ==
The company was very unusual in the world of car making in that it was largely run and staffed by women. For a while the cars were advertised as "a car made by ladies for others of their sex". The factory had originally been built as a wartime aero engine plant and Thomas Pullinger, the manager of Arrol-Johnston, was persuaded by his daughter Dorothée Pullinger to keep the factory open to provide local employment. She was made a director of the new enterprise and set up training courses and apprenticeships specifically for local women. The apprenticeships were to last for three rather than the usual five years as the girls were thought to be better at attending and quicker learners than boys.

The factory was near the River Dee and a dam fitted with water turbines was built to provide power, supplemented by a steam engine. It also had two tennis courts on the roof.

The cars were sturdy and straightforward, and a one-model policy was pursued with, at first, the 10/20, which was heavily influenced by the Fiat 501.

It was not, however, a good time to launch a new car, and only a few hundred were made before the Tongland factory was forced to close in 1923 and production moved to the parent works at Heathall, which had plenty of spare capacity. The Tongland factory was later used to make silk.

A second, larger, Galloway model, the 12, essentially an Arrol-Johnston, replaced the 10/20 in 1925 and remained in production until Arrol-Johnston itself closed in 1928 and Galloway Motors was formally wound up. In all a total of around 4,000 Galloway cars were produced. Dorothée and her husband went on to set up, using new American machinery, White Services Laundries Limited in Croydon, which soon had 17 shops.

== Model range ==
- 1920-1925 Galloway 10/20 1,460 cc (89 cu in) straight-4 side valve
- 1925-1929 Galloway 12 1,669 cc (102 cu in) Straight-4 side valve

=== Galloway 10/20 ===
Galloway 10/20
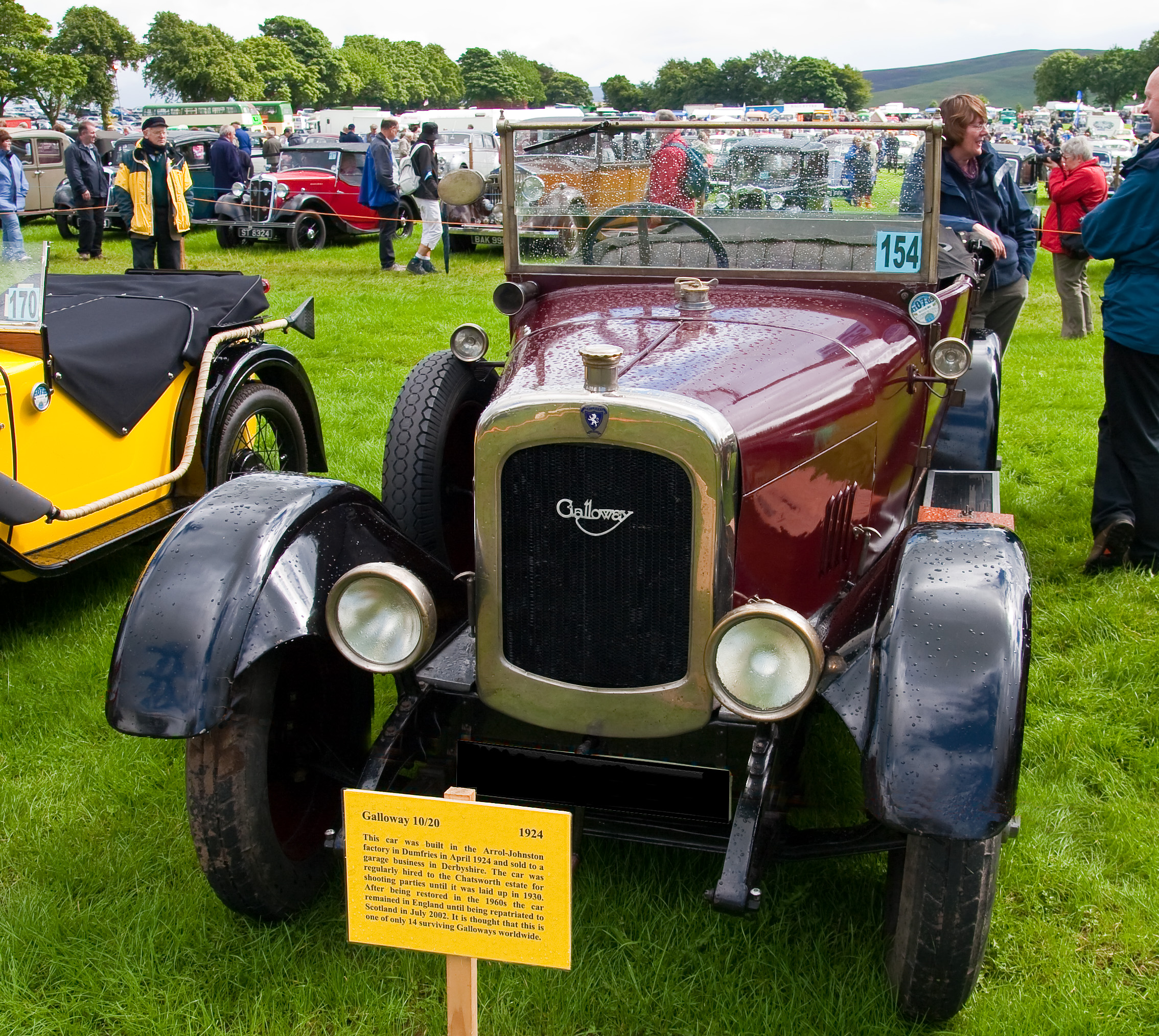
- 1924 Galloway 10/20 at the annual Biggar Vintage Rally, August 2008

Overview
- Production: 1920–1925; 1800 approx produced

Powertrain
- Engine: 1,460 cc (89 cu in) Straight-4 Side valve
- Transmission: 3 speed, later 4 speed manual

Dimensions
- Wheelbase: 102 or 112 in (2,591 or 2,845 mm)
- Length: 156 in (3,962 mm)
- Width: 68 in (1,727 mm)

Designed by T. C. Pullinger from Darracq, Sunbeam and Humber with Fred Neale from Hillman, and heavily influenced by the Fiat 501, the 10/20 used a straight four, side valve engine of 1460 cc driving the rear wheels through either a three or four speed gearbox in unit with the engine. Suspension was by semi elliptic leaf springs at the front and quarter elliptic springs at the rear.

However, the Galloway car had several adaptations to appeal to women drivers. Some, like the introduction of a rear-view mirror and more reliable engine, would be appreciated by all drivers. It was smaller and lighter with more storage space, and the raised seat gave the driver better sight-lines. The hand-brake was situated more conveniently near the driver's seat rather than under the dashboard.

=== Galloway 12, 12/30 and 12/50 ===
Galloway 12

Overview
- Production: 1925–1929 (production numbers not known)

Powertrain
- Engine: 1,669 cc (102 cu in) Straight-4 overhead valve
- Transmission: 4 speed manual

Dimensions
- Wheelbase: 114 in (2,896 mm)
- Length: 156 in (3,962 mm)
- Width: 68 in (1,727 mm)

The engine for the 12 (later called the 12/30 and 12/50) was an Arrol-Johnston unit shared with that make's 12 hp model. On test by The Motor magazine a top speed of 51 mph was achieved. Four-wheel brakes were fitted from 1926, and the name was changed from 12 to 12/30. The car was offered for between £325 and £360 depending on body, which was expensive when compared with cars such as Morris and Austin.

== See also ==
- List of car manufacturers of the United Kingdom
