= George Torode =

Guernsey writer and radio host (1946–2010)

George Torode (30 September 1946 – 20 April 2010) was a Guernsey author, comedian and radio host. He was best known for his series of writings called the Donkey books, which collect stories by and about Guernsey people (the nickname for Guernsey people is Les ânes – "Donkeys")

- Donkey's Ears Ago - 1996 - ISBN 978-0952950103
- Donkey's Ears Apart - 1997 - ISBN 978-0952950110
- Donkey's serenade - 1998 - ISBN 9780952950127
- Donkey's Tails - 1999 - ISBN 978-0952950134
- Donkey's Hind Leg - 2000 - ISBN 9780952950141
- The Donkey's Back - 2004 - ISBN 978-0952950158.
- The Donkey Rides Out - 2005 - ISBN 9780952950165 This volume includes a lengthy section (pp. 123–167) about the pioneering motor engineer and entrepreneur, Dorothee Pullinger. It is almost unique in the materials published about her, in that Torode actually knew her and the materials he uses are largely based on his own recollections of interviews some 20+ years previously.
- Donkey's at Work - 2009 - ISBN 9780952950172

== Radio ==
Torode also co-hosted a radio programme with Fred Hewlett on BBC Guernsey.

== Death ==
Torode died on 20 April 2010, at the age of 63.
