= Arrol-Johnston =

Early automobile manufacturer

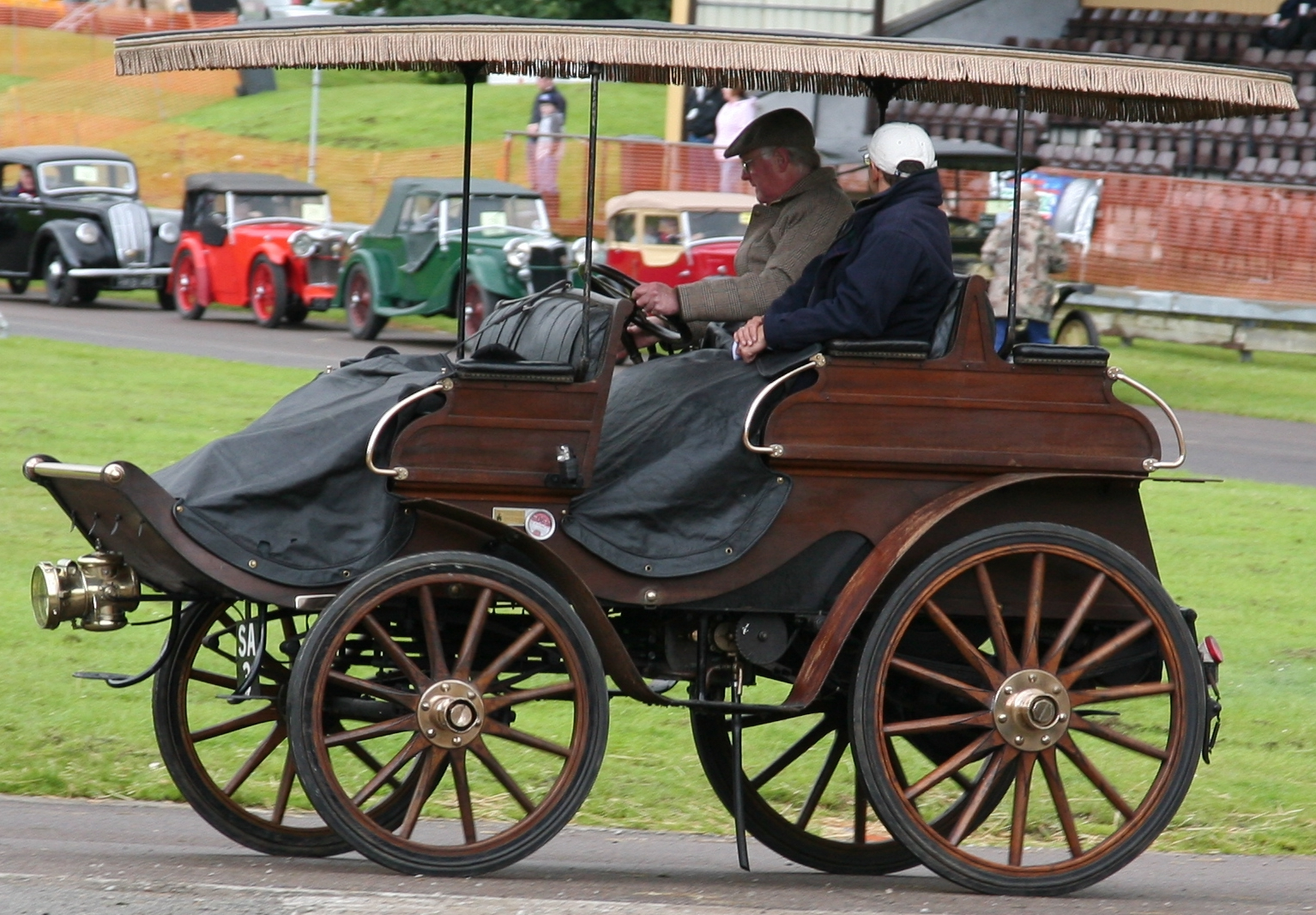
1902 dog cart which remains in the ownership of the family of the original purchaser

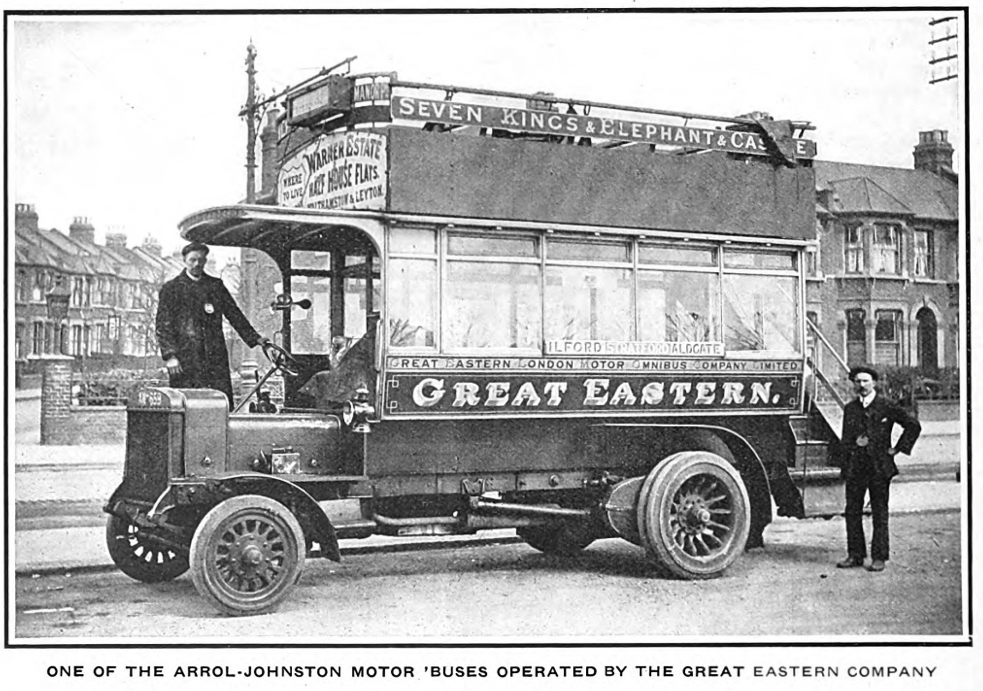
Arrol-Johnston Bus (1909)

Arrol-Johnston (later known as Arrol-Aster) was an early Scottish manufacturer of automobiles, which operated from 1895 to 1931 and produced the first automobile manufactured in Britain. The company also developed the world's first "off-road" vehicle for the Egyptian government, and another designed to travel on ice and snow for Ernest Shackleton's Nimrod Expedition to the South Pole.

== History ==
George Johnston was by training a locomotive engineer from Neilson, Reid and Company Limited of Springburn, Glasgow. Johnston was commissioned by Glasgow Corporation Tramways in 1894 to build an experimental steam-powered tramcar to replace their fleet of horse-drawn trams.

During a final test before a Corporation committee, it caught fire and work was abandoned. Johnston's attention was then turned to a detailed examination of continental makes of motor cars and he came to the conclusion that he could design and make a better vehicle than any of them and, in particular, a better engine. The first British-built motor car was thus conceived and by the end of 1895 was ready for financial backing. In the autumn of that year Johnston was joined by Norman Osborne Fulton and T. Blackwood Murray. Fulton was Johnston's cousin and was made responsible for manufacture and assembly, while Murray had electrical engineering experience, having been Works Manager with Mavor and Coulson, makers of mining machinery in Bridgeton. His first task was the development of electrical ignition in place of the incandescent platinum tubes of the Daimler engine.

George Johnston had an experimental vehicle on the roads in November 1895, and there was an account in the Scotsman of a 3 hour journey in it, reputed to be the first Auto-Car to be seen in Scotland. The driving of a horseless carriage in Glasgow resulted in a prosecution under the Highways and Locomotives (Amendment) Act 1878, where George Johnston conducted his own defence arguing that the vehicle was registered as a carriage and did not fit the definition of locomotive in the act. While he lost his case and was given a nominal fine, there was growing pressure to amend the so called 'red flag acts' that were holding back British motor vehicle development, and later that year the passing of the Locomotives on Highways Act 1896 allowed motor vehicles to travel at as much as 12 mph.

=== Mo-Car Syndicate ===
In 1895 Johnston formed a joint venture with Sir William Arrol MP, an engineer of the Forth Bridge to form the Mo-Car Syndicate Limited, which was to produce his car. Sir William was Chairman and Johnston was Managing Director, and the Syndicate included a Mr. Archibald Coats with a Mr P M Coats of Paisley, and a Mr. John Millar also of Paisley, while Norman Fulton was Works Manager. Sir William's main interest in the business was as the financial backer.

The first Arrol-Johnston car was a six-seater "Dogcart" (a vehicle with two transverse seats placed back to back), which went into production at a factory at Camlachie, in the East End of Glasgow.

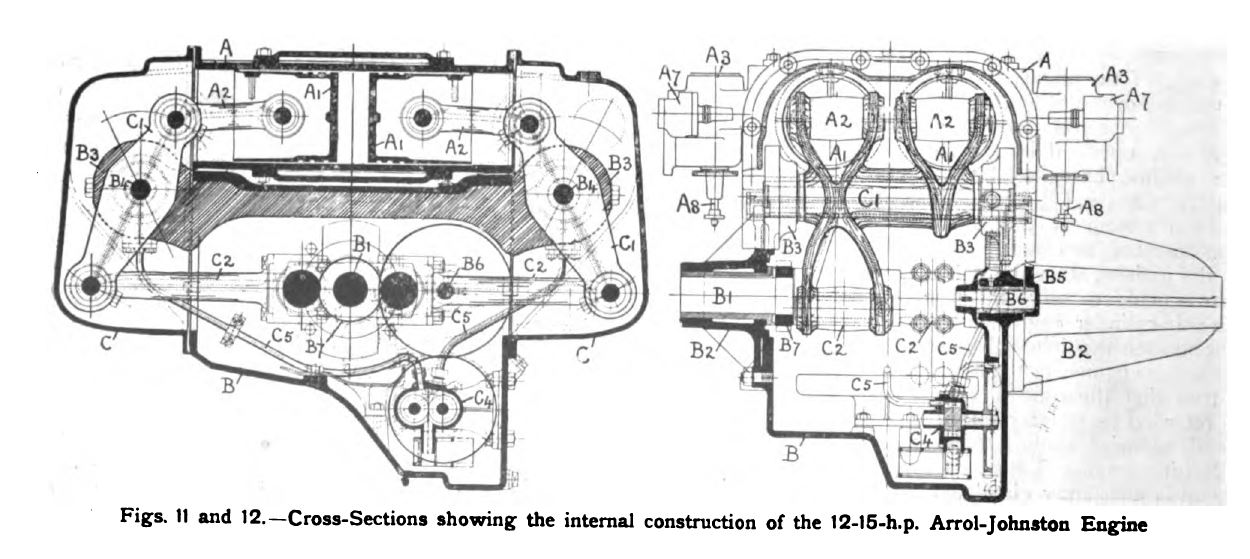
The 1905 Arrol-Johnston opposed-piston twin cylinder engine

The Dogcart was a wood-bodied vehicle powered by a 10 hp 2 cylinder opposed piston engine mounted beneath the floor, which was started by pulling on a rope. The vehicle boasted chain final drive and its high-wheeled, solid-tyred, horse-carriage type of body was retained well into the 1900s. The brakes were arranged in the form of shoes which could be pressed on the back of the solid rear tyres, and the suspension comprised full elliptic leaf springs at the front, and half-elliptics at the rear. Transmission and brake control levers were mounted close to the driver's right hand.

The company's Camlachie premises were destroyed by fire in 1901, and production was moved to Paisley.

In 1902 William Beardmore took the largest single shareholding in the company, creating a captive customer for his iron and steel components. He later became Chairman when A-J (as it was widely known) became a public company.

A-J was restructured financially in 1903. New finance, mainly from Beardmore, became available, Beardmore wishing to help the firm stave off bankruptcy, and there were important changes in staff, including the arrival of J.S. Napier (John Stewart Napier) as Chief Engineer. George Johnston left as a result of a disagreement and founded the All British Car Company, a venture that was to be short-lived. A-J became effectively a wholly owned subsidiary of William Beardmore and Company

=== Arrol-Johnston Car Company Ltd. ===
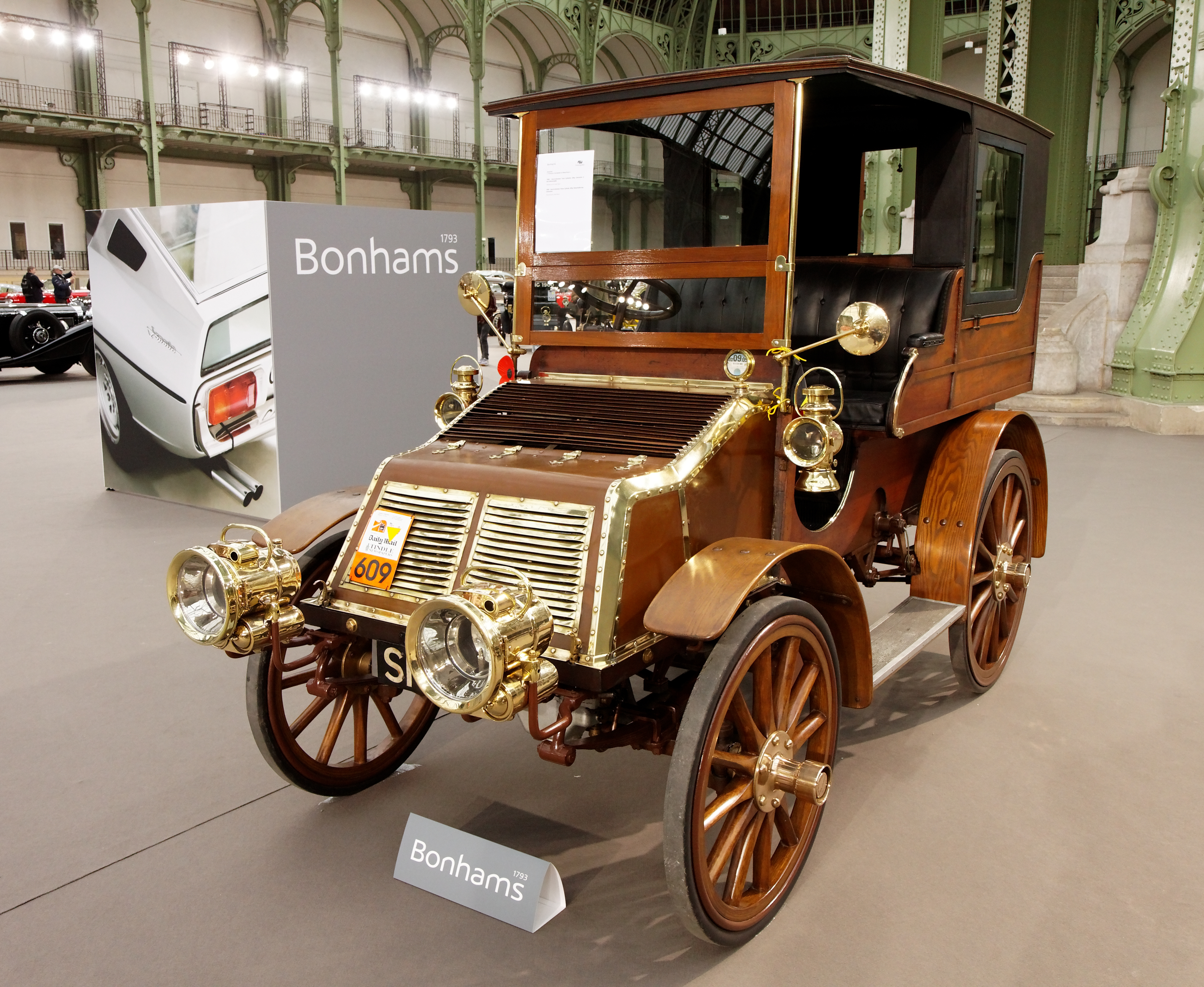
3-cylinder car from 1904, on display in Paris.

In 1905 the company's name was changed to the Arrol-Johnston Car Company Ltd. They had a 4.5-acre well-equipped factory in Paisley, and it was said they made everything there for their vehicles excepting a few specialised items such as springs, tyres and lamps - they even made their own magnetos. In the same year, the company introduced a 3023cc 12/15hp model of more modern appearance; this, however, still used an opposed-piston engine producing 12 bhp at 800rpm and 15 bhp at 1100rpm. There was also a three-cylinder version of the dogcart; this was an uncouth 16 hp with the centre cylinder being of greater bore than the outer two. A 1905 Dogcart with solid wooden disc wheels still survives in Khartoum, inside the Sudan national museum, where it was supplied as a searchlight tender for the Sirdar of Egypt.

Also announced at the 1905 Olympia show was the new 24/30 hp vertical four of 4654cc; followed in 1907 by the 38/45 hp of 8832 cc.

In 1907 Arrol-Johnston were engaged to produce a car for the British Antarctic Expedition, and it did make it to Antarctica, though it was of limited use except on hard ice, so it was restricted to the base camp areas. The car was an alcohol-fuelled air-cooled version of the 12-15 hp model.

The 12/15 hp twin survived in production until 1909. This was the year that T. C. Pullinger (formerly of Darracq, Sunbeam and Humber) joined Arrol-Johnston; he swept out the old range in favour of the new 15·9 hp of 2835cc. That model featured a dashboard radiator and four-wheel brakes (the latter were dropped in 1911). For 1912 a 1794 cc 11·9 hp, a 3640 cc 20·9 hp and a 3618 cc 23·8 hp were introduced.

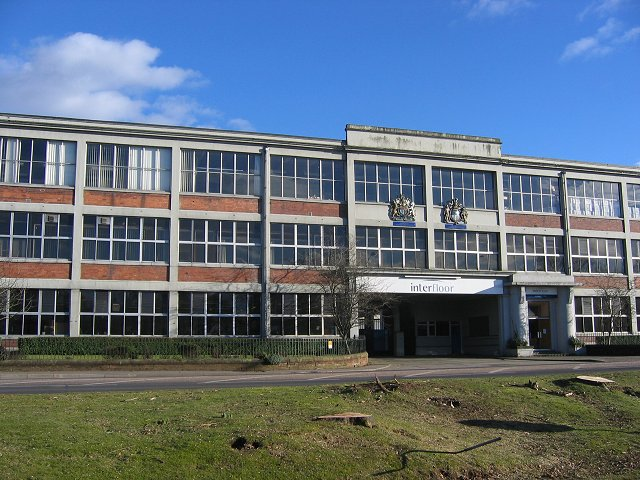
Former Arrol-Johnston factory, Heathhall

In 1913 Arrol Johnston bought land at Heathhall, just outside Dumfries, and commissioned an American firm to build a factory. This is said to be the first factory in Britain to use ferro-concrete (concrete reinforced with metal bars), and was designed by Albert Kahn, architect of the Ford factory at Highland Park, Michigan, where the Model T was produced. A-J contracted to build 50 electric cars for Anderson Electric, maker of the Detroit Electric, at the new plant but it is not certain how many were actually made. Several models of car including the six-cylinder 23/9 were built up to the outbreak of war.

The first post war Arrol-Johnston was the Victory model in 1919 designed by G. W. A. Brown which had an ohc 2651 cc 4-cylinder engine of 40 hp. They introduced the model to agents in March 1919 but the first production car was not delivered until August; it was sold to the Prince of Wales. The Victory sadly proved "unsellable and unreliable", and broke down while on a Royal tour of the West of England, so that the publicity attending its debut was not of the kind it needed. It was soon replaced by a modernized version of the prewar 15·9 hp; it was cheaper, but this was due to such cost-cutting measures as a black-painted radiator and fixed ignition. The 15·9 hp (Type F.K.) was revived as an urgent replacement for the Victory. A more modern version, the 20 hp Type E, was introduced alongside the 15.9 hp in 1922.

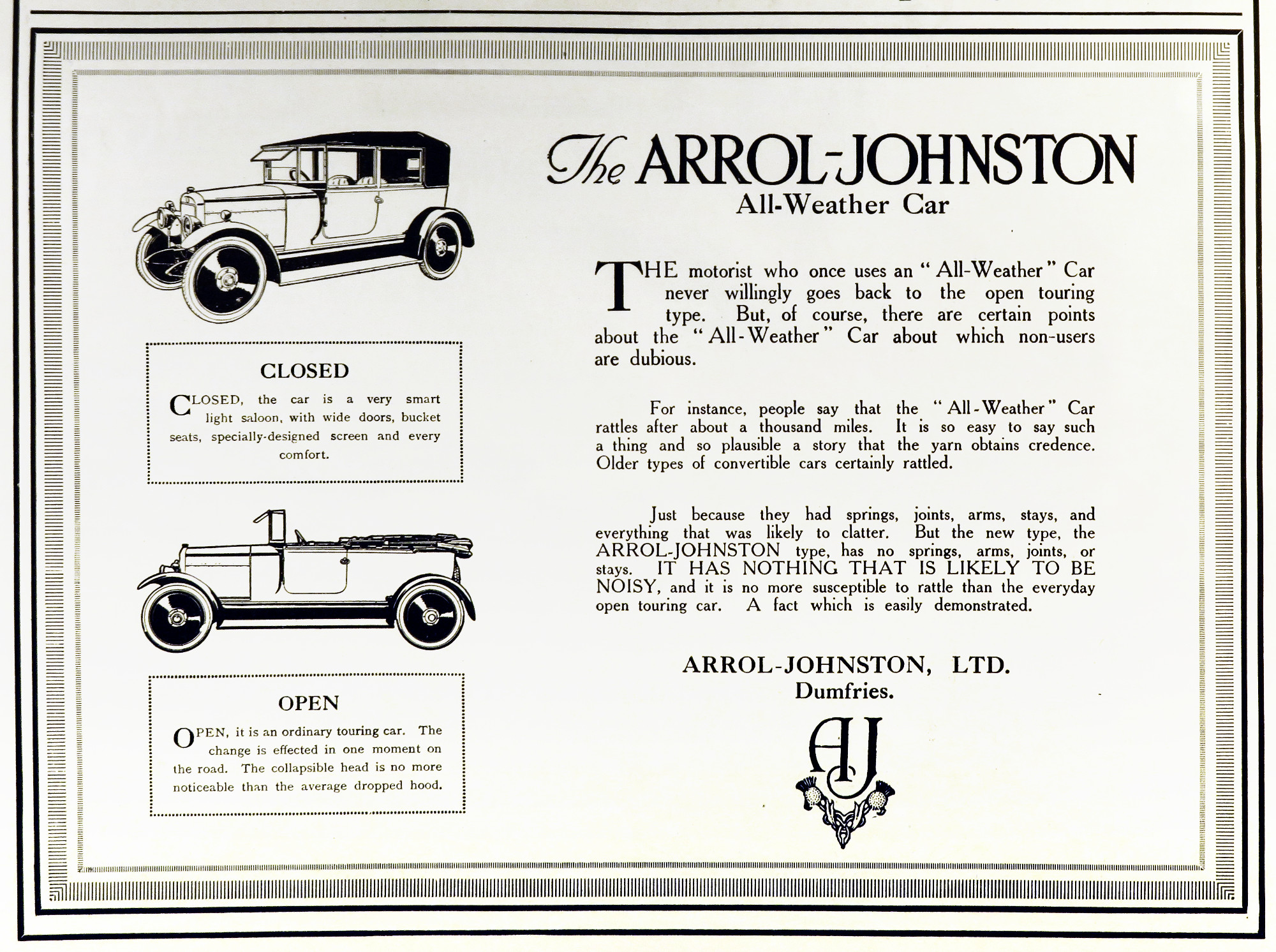
Advert from Pears' Annual Christmas 1921

In 1921 the cheaper Galloway was launched as, in theory, a separate make, from the Tongland works near Kirkcudbright. The car was based on the Fiat 501 and started with the 10/20 with a 1460 cc side-valve engine, in 1925 growing to the 1669 cc 12/20 and 12/30. Production moved to the main A-J factory in Heathhall in 1922. A short-lived 14 hp appeared in 1924, only to be replaced the following year by a 12·3 hp model. There also was a 4-cylinder 3290cc Empire model manufactured for the colonies.

=== Arrol-Aster ===
In 1927 Arrol-Johnston were merged with Aster of Wembley, London to form the combined marque of Arrol-Aster, with directors from both Arrol-Johnston and Aster. The 15.9 hp was retained as were the two current Asters. Both the latter were given Burt-McCollum single sleeve valve engines in the interests of silence, but the 21/60 hp Aster was also available in its original ohv form, renamed the Arrol-Aster. Another completely new Arrol-Aster was the 2.5-litre 6-cylinder 17/50 hp with sleeve valves. The 21/60 hp Arrol-Aster and the 15.9 hp Arrol-Johnston were dropped for 1929, and a straight-8 Arrol-Aster substituted. It had a 3.3-litre sleeve valve engine consisting of the 17/50 unit with two extra cylinders and was available in supercharged form. This was a fast car intended as a sports model, but unlike the French sleeve-valve designs it could not produce high outputs as revolutions were limited.

The company lasted for two years before the company went into receivership. Limited production and sales continued until 1931.

== Football ==
Arrol-Johnston ran a works football team. In 1919 the football club was one of three clubs in Dumfries that merged to form Queen of the South F.C. The most notable players at Arrol-Johnston were Dave Halliday and Ian Dickson. Both then played for Queen of the South before going on to top score for their respective clubs in the top division in England. Halliday in particular had a highly successful goal-scoring career. He then became a trophy-winning manager.

== See also ==
- All-British
- Aster
- Arrol-Aster
- Galloway (car)
- Ateliers de Construction Mecanique l'Aster
