= William Beardmore, 1st Baron Invernairn =

British industrialist

The Right Honourable The Lord Invernairn DL
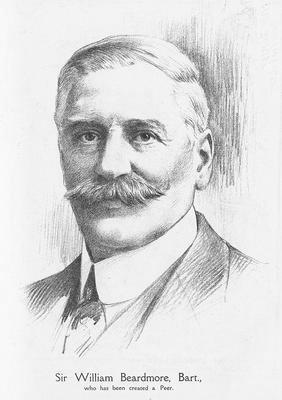
- Sketch of Sir William Beardmore, 1921

Chairman and Managing Director of William Beardmore & Company
- In office 1902 – 9 April 1936

Personal details
- Born: William Beardmore; 16 October 1856 Deptford, London, England
- Died: 9 April 1936 (aged 79) Strathnairn, Inverness-shire, Scotland
- Occupation: Shipbuilder

William Beardmore, 1st Baron Invernairn, DL (16 October 1856 – 9 April 1936), known as Sir William Beardmore, Bt, between 1914 and 1921, was a British industrialist, founding the eponymous William Beardmore and Company.

== Background and education ==
Beardmore was born in Greenwich, London, in the family home. His father, also William Beardmore, was a mechanical engineer, working for the General Steam Navigation Company in Deptford. In 1861 his family moved to Glasgow, where his father bought the Parkhead Forge, a steel mill and supplier to the thriving shipbuilding and railway industries on the Clyde in the east end of the city. He was educated at the High School of Glasgow and Ayr Academy. When he was fifteen, he began an apprenticeship at Parkhead, while taking night classes at Anderson's University. On completing his apprenticeship in 1877 he enrolled at the Royal School of Mines in South Kensington, London.

== Business career ==
Beardmore's father died shortly afterwards and the retirement of the third business partner saw William's uncle Isaac become sole proprietor. William became a junior partner in 1879 and on his uncle's retirement seven years later he became the sole proprietor of the business. He rapidly expanded the business and formed it into the limited company of William Beardmore & Company, of which he became chairman and managing director, in 1902. In 1899, he bought the world-famous yard of Robert Napier and Sons at Govan, on the Clyde. In 1900 he became chairman of J. I. Thornycroft & Co, the torpedo boat builders. In 1902 he also became a shareholder and director of the armaments firm Vickers and the motor manufacturers Arrol-Johnston.

Over the years he diversified his business to include the production of vehicles, armaments, including shells and tanks, aircraft, airships and motorcycles. The original forge business continued to produce a wide array of steel materials, including armour plate, castings, axles, railway equipment, boiler plate and wheels. In 1900, he purchased land on the north bank of the Clyde at Dalmuir, adjacent to the famous yard of John Brown & Company at Clydebank. This he developed into one of the largest and most modern shipyards in the world, but the post-war decline in shipbuilding saw this yard close in 1936.

Amongst ships built by Beardmore were the SS Warilda, later HMAT Warilda, for the Adelaide Steamship Company, the dreadnought HMS Conqueror, the battleship HMS Ramillies, and the first through-deck aircraft carrier HMS Argus. Beardmore sponsored Ernest Shackleton's 1907 Antarctic expedition, and it named the Beardmore Glacier after him.

He was a member of the Royal Institution of Naval Architects, the Institution of Mechanical Engineers, the Iron and Steel Institute, and the Institution of Shipbuilders and Engineers in Scotland. He was also chairman of the Industrial Welfare Society. In 1918 he was awarded the Bessemer Gold Medal of the Iron and Steel Institute for his services to the industry.

Beardmore was created a Baronet, of Flichity in the County of Inverness, in 1914 and raised to the peerage as Baron Invernairn, of Strathnairn in the County of Inverness, in the 1921 New Year Honours.

== Personal life ==
Lord Invernairn died at his home in Strathnairn, Inverness-shire of heart failure on 9 April 1936, aged 79. The baronetcy and barony died with him.

Peerage of the United Kingdom
New creation	Baron Invernairn; 1921–1936	Extinct
Baronetage of the United Kingdom
New creation	Baronet (of Flichity); 1914–1936	Extinct
