= Airco =

British aircraft manufacturer

The Aircraft Manufacturing Company Limited
- Industry: Aviation
- Founded: 1912
- Defunct: 1920
- Fate: Bankruptcy
- Successor: de Havilland
- Headquarters: The Hyde, Hendon, London, England
- Key people: Geoffrey de Havilland
- Products: Aircraft
- Parent: From February 1920, Birmingham Small Arms Company (BSA)
- Subsidiaries: Aircraft Transport and Travel

The Aircraft Manufacturing Company Limited (Airco) was an early British aircraft manufacturer. Established during 1912, it grew rapidly during the First World War, referring to itself as the largest aircraft company in the world by 1918.

Airco produced many thousands of aircraft for both the British and Allied military air wings throughout the war, including fighters, trainers and bombers. The majority of the company's aircraft were designed in-house by Airco's chief designer Geoffrey de Havilland.

Airco established the first airline in the United Kingdom, Aircraft Transport and Travel Limited, which operated as a subsidiary of Airco. On 25 August 1919, it commenced the world's first regular daily international service.

Following the end of the war, the company's fortunes rapidly turned sour. The interwar period was unfavourable for aircraft manufacturers largely due to a glut of surplus aircraft from the war, while a lack of interest in aviation on the part of the British government also hampered its prospects. Airco quickly became unprofitable; during 1920, the firm was sold to Birmingham Small Arms Company, after which its operations were liquidated later that same year. Numerous assets and personnel formerly belonging to the company were integrated into the newly established de Havilland Aircraft Company.

== Origins and de Havilland ==
During 1912, Airco was established by newspaper proprietor and industrialist George Holt Thomas. The firm was initially based at The Hyde in Hendon, north London, England. Starting in August 1914, the aviator William Taylor Birchenough worked as a test pilot for Airco. That same year, learning that Geoffrey de Havilland, who was then at the Royal Aircraft Factory in Farnborough, might be available, Holt Thomas invited him to join Airco as its chief designer. De Havilland's Airco designs would prove decisive to the company, which would eventually provide around 30 per cent of all trainers, fighters and bombers used by Britain and the United States during the First World War. De Havilland's designs for Airco were all marked with his initials "DH".

== Wartime production ==
Airco would design and produce numerous aircraft during the wartime years. Its DH.2, a pusher configuration fighter introduced during 1916, contributed to ending the "Fokker scourge" of 1915. While early air combat over the Western Front had indicated the need for a single-seat fighter with forward-firing armament, there was no dominant approach to applying armaments to fighters at the time. As no means of firing forward through the propeller of a tractor aeroplane was available to the British, Geoffrey de Havilland designed the DH.2 as a smaller, single-seat development of the earlier two-seat DH.1 pusher design. A total of 453 DH.2s were produced by Airco.

Another design produced by de Havilland was the DH.6, which was specifically designed as a military trainer; as this role was normally performed by obsolete service types at the time, it was an unconventional choice to develop a dedicated trainer. The DH.6 possessed relatively gentle flying characteristics, being described as being probably the most "forgiving" aircraft of its time, allowing itself to be flown "crab wise" in improperly banked turns and able to maintain sustained flight at speeds as low as 30 miles per hour (48 km/h). At least 2,282 DH.6s were built in the UK during wartime.

The DH.4 was a two-seat combat aircraft, intended to perform both aerial reconnaissance and day bomber missions. By the end of production, a total of 1,449 aircraft (from orders for 1,700 aircraft) were constructed in Britain for the Royal Flying Corps (RFC) and the Royal Naval Air Service (RNAS). Production of the DH.4 was performed by a variety of companies beyond Airco themselves; these included F.W. Berwick and Co, Glendower Aircraft Company, Palladium Autocars, Vulcan Motor and Engineering, and the Westland Aircraft Work. Overseas, SABCA of Belgium produced a further 15 DH.4s during 1926. In the United States, several different manufacturers, including the Boeing Airplane Corporation, Dayton-Wright Airplane Company, the Fisher Body Corporation, and the Standard Aircraft Corporation produced an Americanised variant of the DH.4, featuring over 1,000 modifications from the original British design, to equip the American air services.

During 1916, the DH.9 was designed as a successor to the DH.4, reusing both its wings and tail unit while adopting a modified fuselage that moved the pilot closer to the gunner/observer and away from the engine and fuel tank, which facilitated communication and was viewed as being a more optimal fighting configuration. However, While the DH.9 was deemed to be suitable for daytime bombing operations, it was found to be incapable of effective nighttime bombing due to the pilot's view being obstructed and visibility via the bombsight being unsuitable. The DH.9's performance in action over the Western Front was typically deemed to have been a disaster; heavy losses of the type were quickly incurred, attributed to both its poor performance and to engine failures, despite the prior derating of its engine to reduce the failure rate.

By December 1918, Holt Thomas claimed in an advertisement that Airco was the largest aircraft company in the world, being engaged in the construction of aeroplanes, engines and propellers in large numbers, as well as a number of airships and flying boats. The engines being built included licensed production of Gnome and Le Rhone rotary engines. The company's works at Hendon employed between 7,000 and 8,000 people and had the latest metal-working machinery, in addition to extensive testing equipment, including a materials testing laboratory and a wind tunnel. At one stage, Airco was reportedly completing one new aircraft every 45 minutes on average. During 1920, the aviation periodical Flight Magazine reported that, during the period from August 1914 to November 1918, the D.H. Airco aircraft manufactured in both Britain and the United States had comprised approximately 30 per cent of the total output of aeroplanes of these two allies.

Following the Armistice of 11 November 1918 and the end of the conflict, many of the wartime DH.4s and DH.9s, along with the improved DH.9A, served for many years with the newly created Royal Air Force. These aircraft also formed the basis of early de Havilland-designed airliners, including the company's DH.16 and DH.18 types which were operated by Aircraft Transport and Travel Limited, the first airline established in the United Kingdom, which was also owned by George Holt Thomas.

== Airline operations and the first daily international flights ==
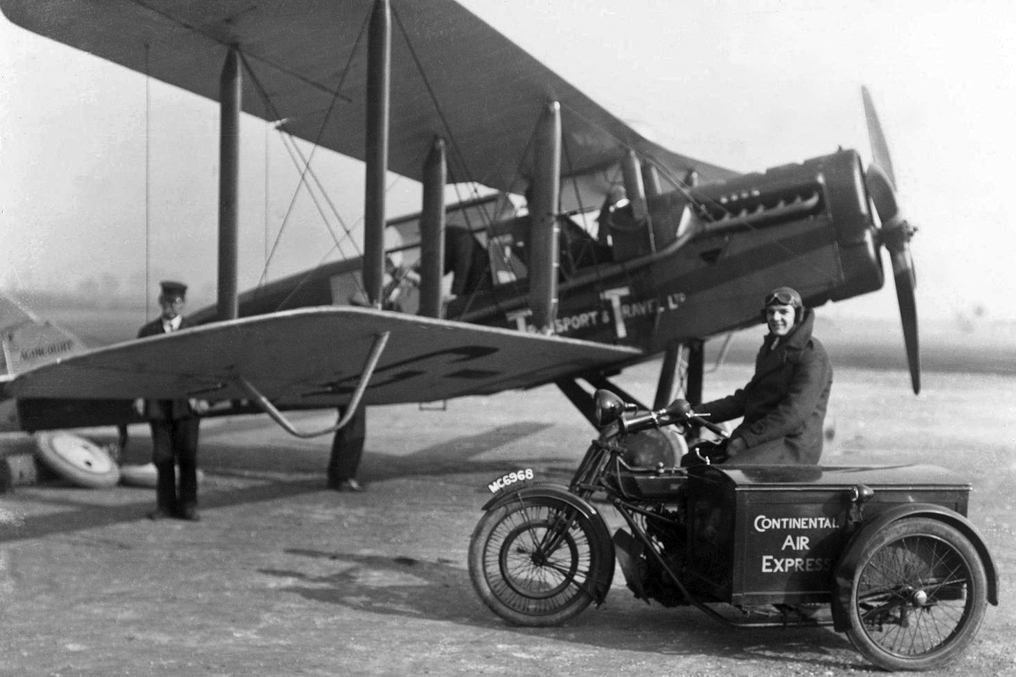
Airco DH.16 used by Aircraft Transport and Travel

Airco decided to enter into the early airline business, established a dedicated subsidiary, Aircraft Transport and Travel (AT&T), for this purpose. On 25 August 1919, the firm commenced the world's first regular daily international service, between Hounslow Heath Aerodrome and Le Bourget Aerodrome, France. A number of DH.16s were used for this service.

In addition to operating the London-to-Paris service, AT&T also launched other routes, including one between Croydon Airport and Amsterdam, on behalf of the Dutch airline KLM. On 17 May 1920, an AT&T DH.16 (G-EALU) performed the first KLM service between London and Amsterdam.

== Sale to BSA and liquidation ==
Following the cessation of hostilities, the large number of war-surplus machines, sharp fluctuations in business confidence, and the government's failure, unlike those of USA and France, to provide any form of support, Airco became unprofitable. Thomas endeavoured to sell Airco to a car manufacturer. Airco and BSA, parent company of Daimler, announced on 1 March 1920 that Airco had amalgamated with Birmingham Small Arms Company.

Within days BSA discovered Airco was in a far more serious financial state than Thomas had revealed. Thomas was immediately removed from his new seat on the BSA board and all BSA's new acquisitions were placed in liquidation. As a result of the financial situation that it inherited, BSA was unable to issue a dividend to shareholders for the following four years. With help from Thomas, de Havilland bought the group's assets he needed to form the de Havilland Aircraft Company during 1920.

Aircraft Transport and Travel had been allowed to continue to operate until December 1920. BSA then bought Aircraft Transport and Travel's aircraft from the liquidator and, in early 1921, combined it with Daimler Air Hire, which it had established in 1919, to form Daimler Airway under Daimler Hire's manager Frank Searle.

== List of Airco aircraft ==
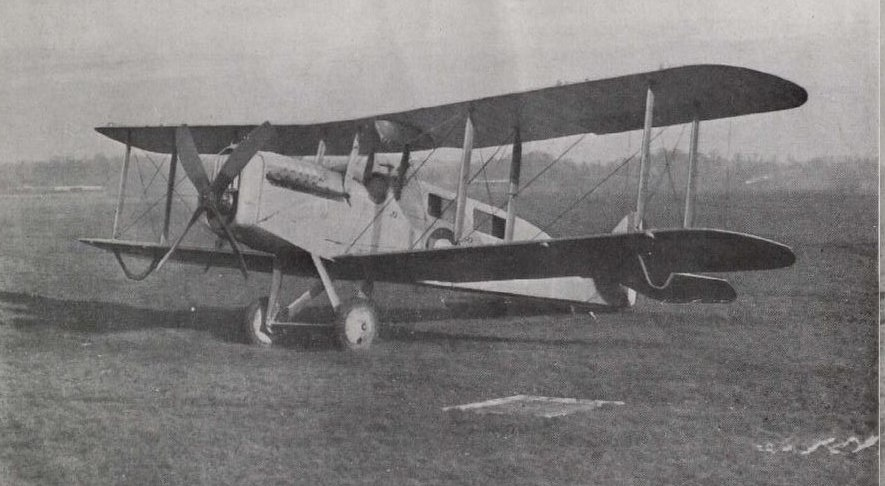
"The Aircraft Manufacturing Company's new high-speed Aeroplane for two passengers, fitted with a 360 h.p. Rolls-Royce engine. Speed 130 miles an hour." (1919)

- Airco DH.1:(1915) – Two-seat biplane fighter with single pusher propeller
  - Airco DH.1A - Around 70 built with Beardmore engines.
- Airco DH.2 (1915) – Single-seat biplane fighter with single pusher propeller
- Airco DH.3 (1916) – Twin-engine biplane bomber. Two prototypes only built; formed basis for later DH.10 design
  - Airco DH.3A - Second prototype with a Beardmore engine.
- Airco DH.4 (1916) – Two-seat biplane day bomber with single tractor propeller
  - Airco DH.4A Civil version. Built in the United Kingdom. Two passengers in glazed cabin behind pilot.
  - Airco DH.4R Single seat racer - 450 hp (3406 kW) Napier Lion engine.
- Airco DH.5 (1916) – Single-seat biplane fighter with single tractor propeller
- Airco DH.6 (1916) – Two-seat biplane training aircraft with single tractor propeller
- Airco DH.9 (1917) – Two-seat biplane day bomber with single tractor propeller.
  - Airco DH.9A (1918)- development of DH.9 with Liberty engine
  - Airco DH.9C (1921) - conversion of DH.9 as passenger aircraft
- Airco DH.10 Amiens (1918) – Twin-engine biplane bomber. First prototype used pusher propeller; second prototype and production aircraft used tractor propellers. Manufactured by Daimler.
  - DH.11 Oxford (1919) Variant of DH.10 with radial engines. One prototype built; not produced
- Airco DH.15 Gazelle (1919) - One DH.9A aircraft converted into an engine test-bed.
- Airco DH.16 (1919) - redesign of DH.9A with cabin for four passengers. Used as airliner
- Airco DH.18 (1920) – Single-engine biplane airliner. Cabin for eight passengers
