= Aircraft Transport and Travel =

British airline

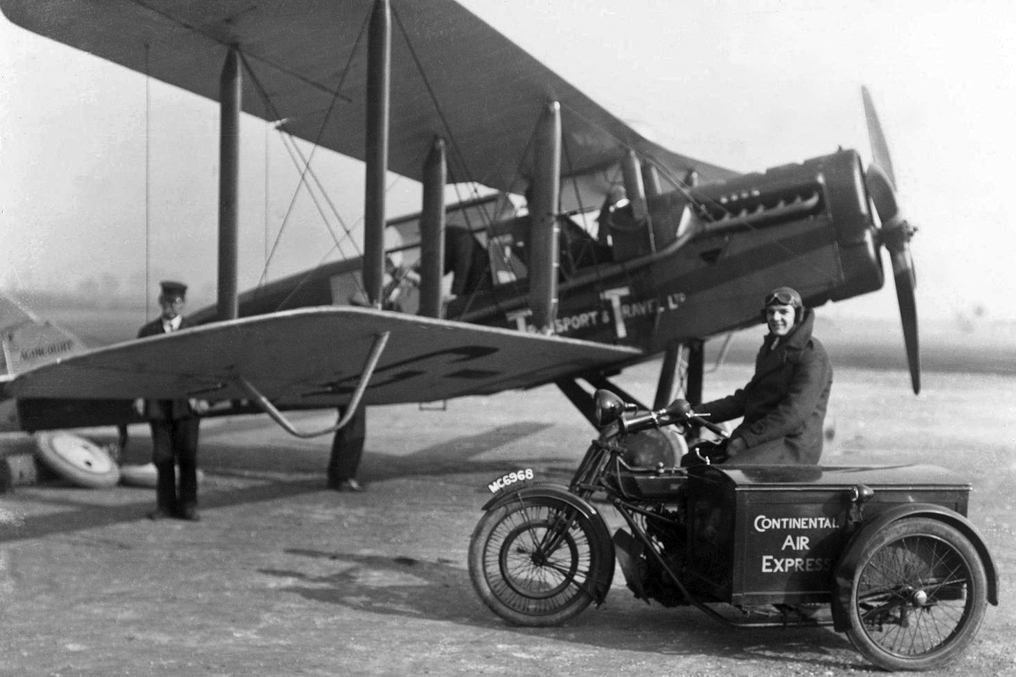
- De Havilland DH.16, Aircraft Transport and Travel, probably Croydon 1920
- Founded: 5 October 1916
- Ceased operations: 28 February 1921 (BSA continued its services through Daimler Airway)
- Hubs: Hounslow Heath Aerodrome; Croydon Airport
- Secondary hubs: Folkestone
- Destinations: Ghent; Paris–Le Bourget Airport
- Parent company: Airco (acquired by Birmingham Small Arms Company (BSA) in February 1920)

Aircraft Transport and Travel Limited (AT&T), also known as Air Express, was the first British airline. Formed during the First World War as a subsidiary of Airco, an aircraft manufacturer, it was the first airline in the world to operate a daily commercial aviation service, an international flight between London and Paris. It is the oldest predecessor of British Airways.

== Operations ==
On 5 October 1916, Aircraft Transport and Travel (AT&T) was formed by George Holt Thomas. Using a fleet of former military Airco DH.4A biplanes, it operated relief flights between Folkestone and Ghent. On 15 July 1919, the company flew a proving flight across the English Channel, despite a lack of support from the British government. Flown by Lt. H. Shaw in an Airco DH.9 between RAF Hendon and Paris–Le Bourget Airport, the flight took 2 hours and 30 minutes, and cost £21 per passenger.

On 25 August 1919, the company used DH.16s to start a daily service from Hounslow Heath Aerodrome to Le Bourget, the first regular (daily) international flight service in the world. The airline soon gained a reputation for reliability, despite problems with bad weather. In November 1919, it won the first British civil airmail contract. Six Royal Air Force Airco DH.9A aircraft, modified with Napier Lion engines were lent to the company from October 1919, to operate the airmail service between Hawkinge and Cologne, which Aircraft Transport and Travel took over from the RAF on 15 August 1919. In 1920, they were returned to the Royal Air Force.

In February 1920, with its parent Airco, AT&T, also known as Air Express, was acquired by part of the Birmingham Small Arms Company (BSA). It continued operations, under the control of Frank Searle of Daimler Hire.

As well as the London (Hounslow) to Paris service, AT&T also operated a Croydon Airport to Amsterdam service on behalf of KLM. On 17 May 1920, a DH.16 (G-EALU) of AT&T operated the first KLM service between London and Amsterdam.

AT&T continued to operate, but was overburdened with debt. In November 1920, BSA placed Airco in liquidation, and on 17 December 1920, AT&T ran its last service. Early in 1921, its assets were purchased by BSA subsidiary Daimler and rolled with Daimler Air Hire Limited into a new company called Daimler Airway Limited which continued the services.

By 1921, six companies operated a London to Paris service, three French and three British. The French airlines were receiving subsidies from the French government, and in protest the three British airlines stopped services on 28 February 1921.

=== Aircraft ===
- Airco DH.4
- Airco DH.4A
- Airco DH.6
- Airco DH.9
- Airco DH.9A
- Airco DH.9B
- de Havilland DH.16
- de Havilland DH.18

== Legacy ==
Through a series of takeovers and mergers, the modern-day British Airways traces part of its legacy back to Aircraft Transport and Travel, its earliest corporate ancestor. BA celebrated 1919 as the centenary of its operational passenger flights.

== See also ==
- Aviation in the United Kingdom
- History of British Airways
- List of airlines by foundation date
- List of defunct airlines of the United Kingdom
