= Airco DH.9C =

DH.9C
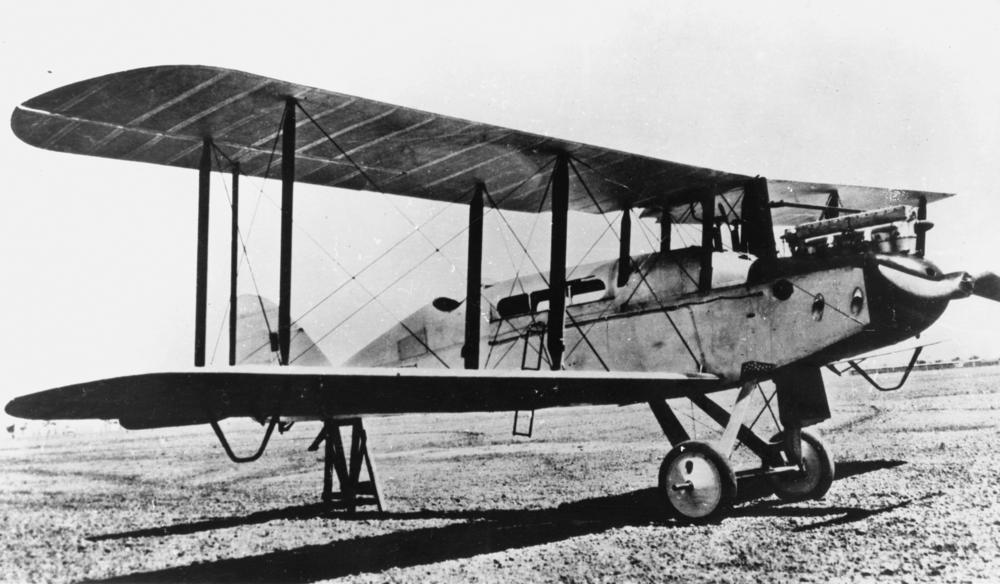
- Australian registered DH.9C G-AUED c.1923

General information
- Type: passenger
- National origin: United Kingdom
- Manufacturer: Airco
- Number built: 19

History
- First flight: late 1921
- Developed from: Airco DH.9

The Airco DH.9C was a British passenger aircraft.

== Development and design ==
After World War I there were many surplus Airco DH.9 light bombers, designed by Geoffrey de Havilland, available for the emerging air transport business. At first stripped DH.9s were used to carry one passenger behind the pilot in the gunner's position, but later versions, designated DH.9B, added a second passenger seat ahead of the pilot. A second seat behind the pilot was added by extending the rear cockpit in the early DH.9C. Later it had this rear position converted to hold two passengers face to face, protected by a faired dorsal canopy or cabin. Most of these later four-seat aircraft had slight sweepback to counter the rearward shift in the centre of gravity.

The DH.9, DH.9B, and DH.9C were dimensionally similar, with the same wingspan and height and only small variations in length depending on the powerplant. They were two-bay tractor biplanes, with fixed two-wheel main and tail-skid undercarriage. Their structures were of spruce and ash, wire-braced and fabric-covered.

The first four-seat, swept DH.9C, G-EAYT received its certificate of airworthiness on 13 January 1922.

== Operational history ==
Nineteen aircraft were produced for operators, 13 in the United Kingdom, three in Australia, and three in Spain. The last in service was operated by Northern Air Lines in Barton, Greater Manchester, until 1932.

== Operators ==
Information from

Australia

- Qantas (3 aircraft)
- Morlae Airways (1 aircraft)

Belgium

- Sneta (precursor to Sabena) (1 aircraft)

Kingdom of Hejaz

- Hejaz Air Force (2 aircraft)

Netherlands

- KLM (1 aircraft)

Spain

- Compañía Española de Tráfico Aéreo (CETA) (3 aircraft)

United Kingdom

- The de Havilland Aeroplane Hire Service (7 aircraft)
- Northern Air Lines (2 aircraft)

== Specifications ==
Data from

General characteristics

- Crew: 1
- Capacity: 4 (3 passengers)
- Length: 30 ft 6 in (9.30 m)
- Wingspan: 42 ft 4.63 in (12.92 m)
- Height: 11 ft 2 in (3.40 m)
- Wing area: 434 sq ft (40.3 m^{2})
- Empty weight: 2,600 lb (1,179 kg)
- Gross weight: 3,300 lb (1,497 kg)
- Powerplant: 1 × Siddeley Puma , 230 hp (172 kW)

Performance

- Maximum speed: 115 mph (185 km/h, 100 kn)
- Cruise speed: 95 mph (153 km/h, 83 kn)
- Range: 500 mi (805 km, 430 nmi)
- Service ceiling: 19,000 ft (5,790 m)
- Rate of climb: 660 ft/min (3.35 m/s)

== See also ==
Related development

- Airco DH.9
- Airco DH.9A
- Airco DH.9B

== Bibliography ==
- Jackson, A.J. De Havilland aircraft since 1909. London: Putnam Publishing Co. Ltd, 1978 ISBN 0-370-30022-X
- Prins, François (Spring 1994). "Pioneering Spirit: The QANTAS Story". Air Enthusiast. No. 53. pp. 24–32. ISSN 0143-5450.
