= International flight =

Commercial airplane flight between airports in separate countries

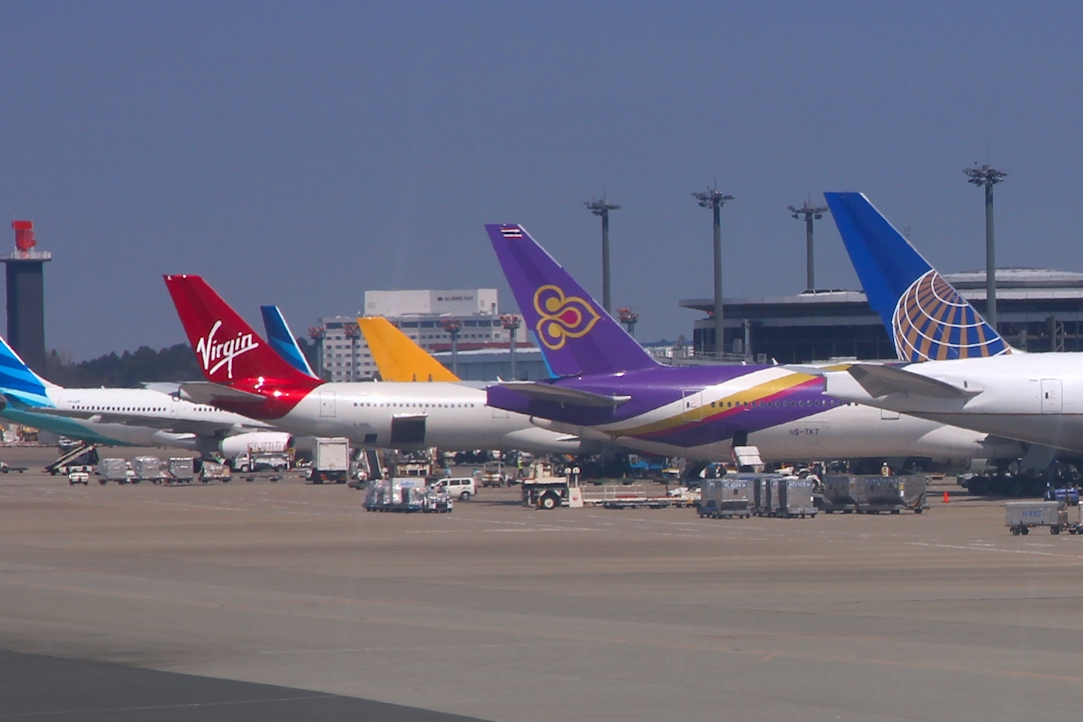
A variety of airliners have moved into place at Tokyo Narita Airport in April 2012, with all of the depicted aircraft arriving in Japan as a result of international flights.

An international flight is a form of commercial flight within civil aviation where the departure and the arrival take place in different countries.

Since its origins, international commercial flights have taken place with a variety of aircraft types including airplanes and airships. Modern international flight typically takes place on wide-body aircraft and involves immigration and customs formalities through international airports.

== History ==
One of the first flights between two countries was on January 7, 1785, when Jean-Pierre Blanchard and John Jeffries crossed the English Channel in a hot air balloon. It took more than a century for the first heavier-than-air object to repeat this process: Louis Blériot crossed the English Channel on July 25, 1909, winning a Daily Mail prize of £1,000.

The first airline to operate ad-hoc international flights was Chalk's Ocean Airways, established 1917, which operated scheduled seaplane services from Florida to the Bahamas. The company claimed to have begun a scheduled international service on this route in February 1919.

The British airship, HM Airship R34 was the first aircraft of any type to carry passengers across the Atlantic Ocean when on 2 July 1919 it left Scotland, travelled to New York and returned.

Lignes Aériennes Farman, which became part of Air France, began a weekly service between Paris and Brussels on March 22, 1919, the world's first international commercial aviation service.

A daily international service was established on August 25, 1919, with a flight going from Hounslow Heath Aerodrome in London, England to Le Bourget, near Paris, France. The journey was organized and operated by the firm Aircraft Transport and Travel (AT&T), a forerunner of British Airways (BA). Besides ferrying travelers, the flights, which occurred daily, also transported mail and parcels. The De Havilland DH4A aircraft were designed for combat during the First World War but saw extensive later use. Looking back, historical writer Paul Jarvis commented that during the "very early days it was very much just about persuading people to fly at all" given that "quite a lot of people" considered aviation as a whole to be "just a passing fad."

The post-war period brought about widespread cultural changes in multiple nations that resulted in international flights becoming embraced by large populations. After World War II, international commercial flights were regulated by the creation of the International Air Transport Association (IATA) and the International Civil Aviation Organization (ICAO). Both organizations continue into the 21st century.

== Immigration and customs formalities ==
An important difference between international and domestic flights is that, before boarding the aircraft, passengers must undergo migration formalities and, when arriving to the destination airport, they must undergo both immigration and customs formalities. Exceptions exist in situations such as when the departure and arrival countries are members of the same diplomatically organized free travel area, an example being the Schengen Area within Europe. Said group of traveling agreements resulted from the 1985 Schengen Agreement and the 1990 Schengen Convention, both matters of international law being signed in Luxembourg.

== International airports ==
Airports serving international flights are known as international airports. For example, King Fahd International Airport within the Dammam metropolis of Saudi Arabia has the largest landmass of any airport in the world, with the complex encompassing over three-hundred square miles of territory. By comparison, the Middle Eastern nation of Bahrain is actually smaller. These international facilities typically are of a far greater size than standard airports, usually including expanded amenities such as areas with bookshops, lounges, and restaurants. Experiences not normally associated with airports such as banks providing financial services may be offered to travelers in such complexes.

== Aircraft ==
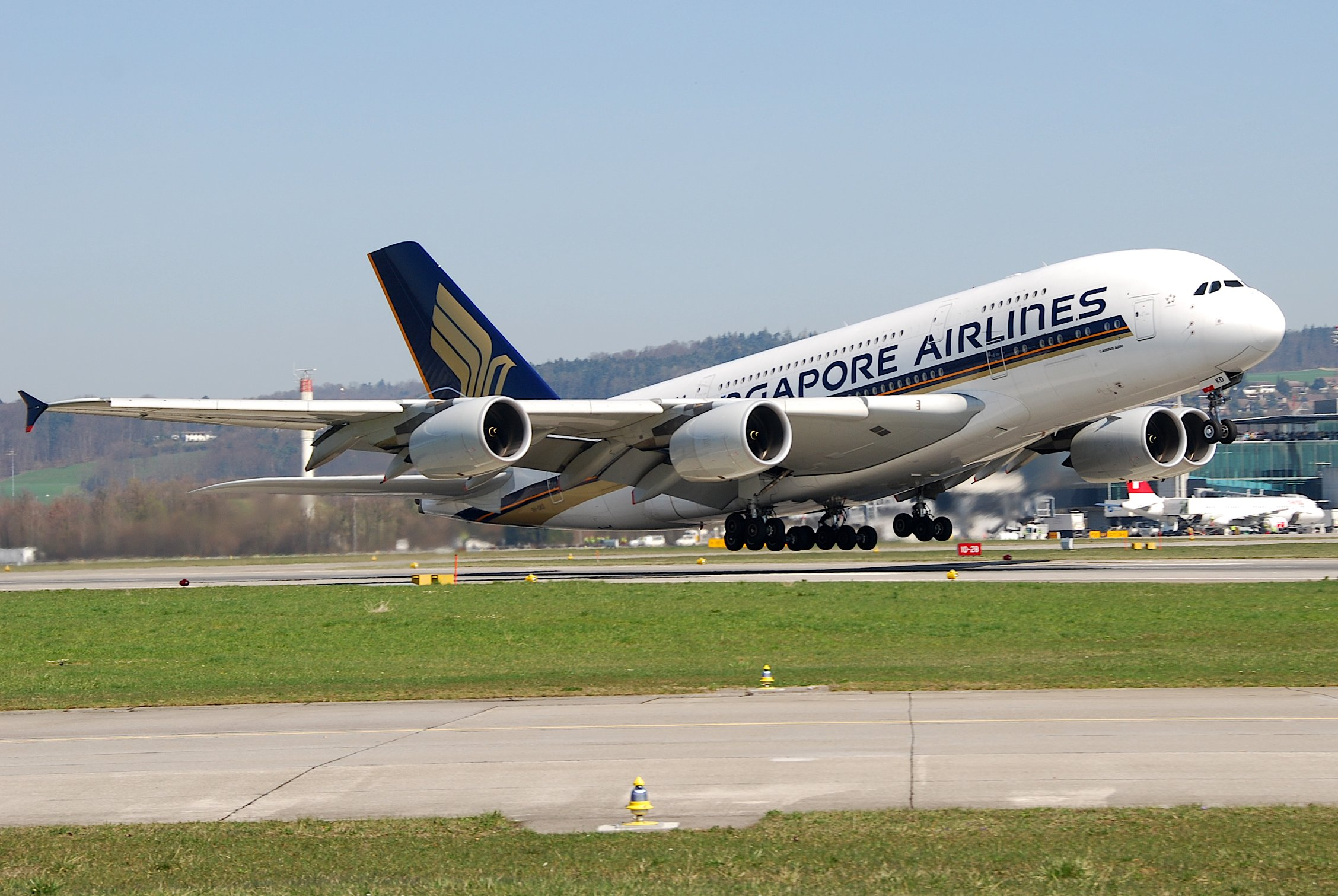
Larger aircraft such as the Airbus A380 are often used for international flights.

Most modern international passenger travel takes place using wide-body aircraft but all types of aircraft can be used, including private jets, helicopters and airships.

== See also ==
- Air transport agreement
- Airliner
- Convention on International Civil Aviation
- Domestic flight
- Non-stop flight
- International Air Transport Association
- International Civil Aviation Organization
