= Commercial aviation =

Transport system providing air transport for hire

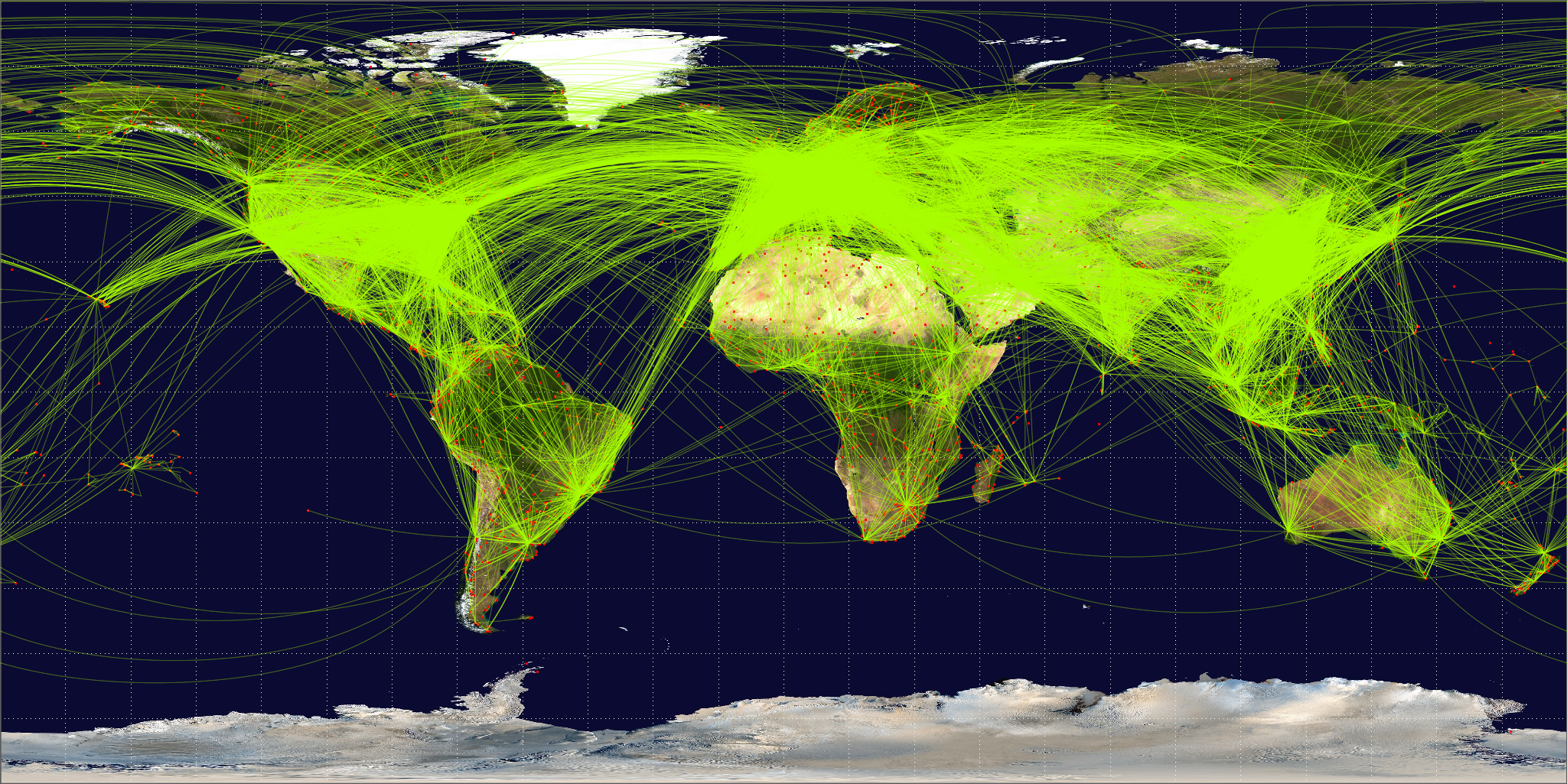
Route map of the world's scheduled commercial airline traffic, 2024

Commercial aviation is the part of civil aviation that involves operating aircraft for remuneration or hire, as opposed to private aviation.

== Definition ==
Commercial aviation is not a rigorously defined category. All commercial air transport and aerial work operations are regarded as commercial aviation, as well as some general aviation flights.

An aircraft operation involving the transportation of people, goods, or mail for payment or hiring is referred to as commercial air transport. Both scheduled and unscheduled air transport operations are included. An aircraft used for specialized services including agriculture, construction, photography, surveying, observation and patrol, search and rescue, advertising, etc. is referred to as aerial work.

General aviation includes commercial activities such as flight instruction, aerial work, and corporate and business aviation, as well as non-commercial activities such as recreational flying.

Most commercial aviation activities require at minimum a commercial pilot licence, and some require an airline transport pilot licence (ATPL). In the US, the pilot in command of a scheduled air carriers' aircraft must hold an ATPL. In the UK, pilots must hold an ATPL before they be pilot in command of an aircraft with 9 or more passenger seats.

Not all activities involving pilot remuneration require a commercial pilot licence. For example, in European Union Aviation Safety Agency states and the UK it is possible to become a paid flight instructor with only a private pilot licence. Nonetheless, in the UK, flight instruction is considered a commercial operation.

It is the purpose of the flight, not the aircraft or pilot, that determines whether the flight is commercial or private. For example, if a commercially licensed pilot flies a plane to visit a friend or attend a business meeting, this would be a private flight. Conversely, a private pilot could legally fly a multi-engine complex aircraft carrying passengers for non-commercial purposes (no compensation paid to the pilot, and a pro rata or larger portion of the aircraft operating expenses paid by the pilot).

== History ==
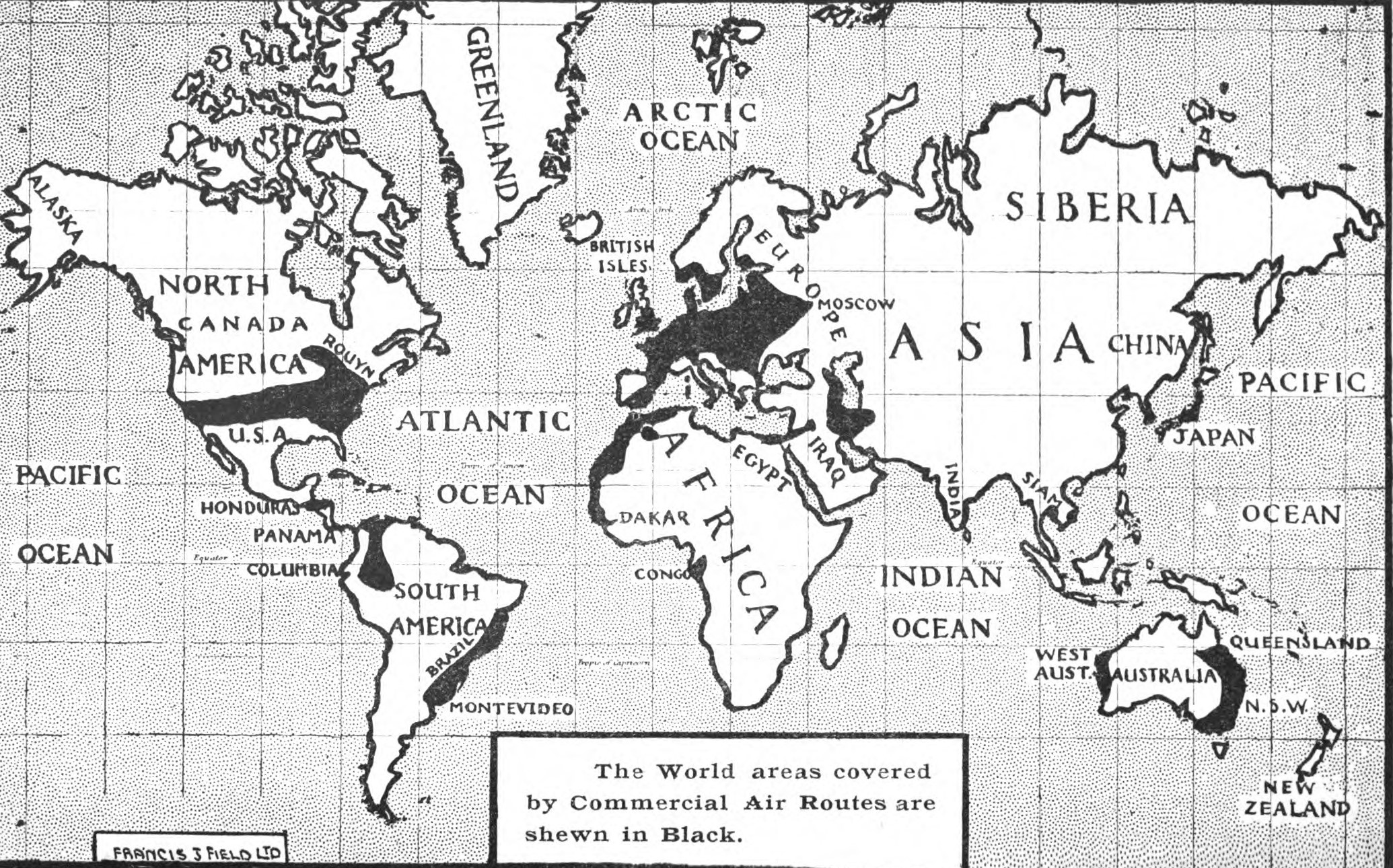
Areas covered by commercial air routes in 1925

Aviation technology emerged during World War I. Aviation between the World Wars saw the development of the first commercial flights. The major players in the early aviation industry were Britain, France, the United States, and the Soviet Union. Post-war aviation saw the rapid expansion of commercial operations around the world.

=== Europe ===
==== Britain ====
Five airlines were established in the United Kingdom between 1916 and 1922. The first of these was Aircraft Transport and Travel (AT&T), which operated the world's first regular scheduled international flight for passengers in 1919.

The first commercial jet airliner to fly was the British de Havilland DH.106 Comet. By 1952, the British state airline British Overseas Airways Corporation had introduced the Comet into scheduled service. While a technical achievement, the plane suffered a series of highly public failures, including the crashes of BOAC Flight 781 and South African Airways Flight 201. The Comet 4 was introduced in 1958. The first successful service, from October 1958, was London–New York City, which became the typical jet set route.

==== France ====
Société Générale des Transports Aériens (SGTA) was the first commercial airline company in France, founded as Lignes Aériennes Farman in 1919. Commercial aviation developed in the France in the 1920s, subsidised by the government.

=== North America ===
==== United States ====
Harry Bruno and Juan Trippe were early promoters of commercial aviation.

The Air Commerce Act of 1926 began to regularize commercial aviation by establishing standards, facilitation, and promotion. An Aeronautical Branch was established in the Department of Commerce with William P. MacCracken Jr. as director. To promote commercial aviation, he told town fathers that "Communities without airports would be communities without airmail."

Writing for Collier's in 1929, he noted "Commercial aviation is the first industry inspired by hero-worship and built upon heros". He cited the promotion in South America by Herbert Dargue in early 1927. After his 1927 trans-Atlantic flight, Charles Lindbergh made a tour of the contiguous United States, paid for by the Daniel Guggenheim Foundation for the Promotion of Aeronautics. From that point, commercial aviation took off:

Roads were choked on Sundays, for weeks afterward, by motorists trying to get to Lambert Field, Lindbergh's home port in Saint Louis, to buy their first air hop. Hundreds of thousands of you went aloft for the first time that summer.

The Aeronautical Branch was charged with issuing commercial pilot licenses, airworthiness certificates, and with investigating air accidents.

Many small regional airlines operated in the 1920s in the United States. Many of them merged or were acquired late in the decade by the first developing nationwide airlines, such as Eastern Airlines, Pan Am, American Airlines, and TWA.

After World War II, commercial aviation grew rapidly, using mostly ex-military aircraft to transport people and cargo. The experience used in designing heavy bombers such as the Boeing B-29 Superfortress and Avro Lancaster could be used for designing heavy commercial aircraft. The Douglas DC-3 also made for easier and longer commercial flights. With the Boeing 707, Pan Am made its first scheduled flight between New York City and Paris on 26 October 1958.

=== Latin America ===
In the 1910s, Brazil and Argentina were among the first Latin American countries to possess the instruments of aircraft that were not all locally made, yet the aircraft was locally congregated. At that time, many individuals were interested to be pilots in Latin American countries, yet there were not sufficient resources and funding to support and promote the best interests of the aviation industry. Amidst these obstacles, Argentina and the Dominican Republic made efforts in creating jet aviation rather than creating and using propeller planes. In 1944, the Chicago Convention on International Civil Aviation attended by all Latin American countries except Argentina drafted the clauses of aviation law. The introduction of the jet fighter F-80 by the US in 1945 pushed the Latin American countries even further away from development of aviation industry because it was simply expensive to recreate the sophisticated technology of F-80.

The Latin American Civil Aviation Commission (LACAC) was formed in December 1973 "intended to provide civil aviation authorities in the region with an adequate framework for cooperation and coordination of activities related to civil aviation". In 1976, about seven percent of the world logged in the Latin American and Caribbean region. This contributed to the increase of average annual rate of air traffic. Subsequently, higher passenger load factor decided the profitability of these airlines.

According to C. Bogolasky, airline pooling agreements between Latin American airlines contributed to better financial performance of the airlines. The economic problems related to the "airline capacity regulation, regulation of non-scheduled operations, tariff enforcement, high operating costs, passenger and cargo rates."

== Business aviation ==
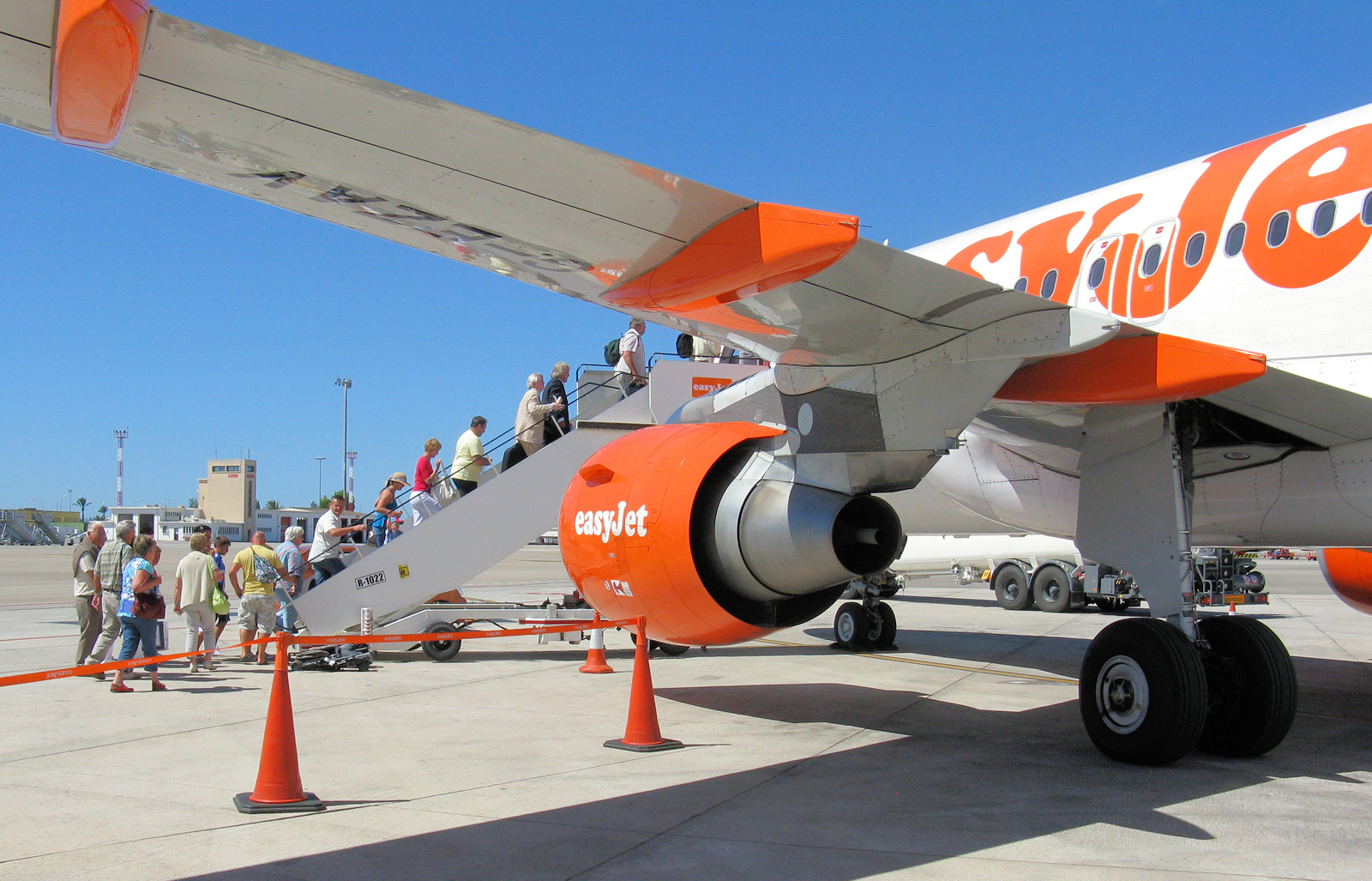
A commercial aviation scene at Palma de Mallorca, the airport of Mallorca, Spain. Passengers board an EasyJet Airbus A320 (2010)

=== Private jet ownership ===
Private jet ownership refers to individuals or corporations owning their own aircraft. Owners are responsible for the management and maintenance of their aircraft and often employ a dedicated crew. The aircraft may be operated for personal or business use.

=== Charter flights ===
Charter flights allow individuals or groups to rent an aircraft for a specific trip, without the need for long-term commitments. Charter flights provide flexibility and convenience, as travelers can choose their own schedules and destinations.

=== Fractional ownership ===
Fractional ownership is a model that allows individuals or corporations to purchase a share of an aircraft, granting them access to a fleet of aircraft managed by a provider. Fractional owners typically pay an initial acquisition cost, followed by monthly management fees and hourly flight rates.

=== Jet card programs ===
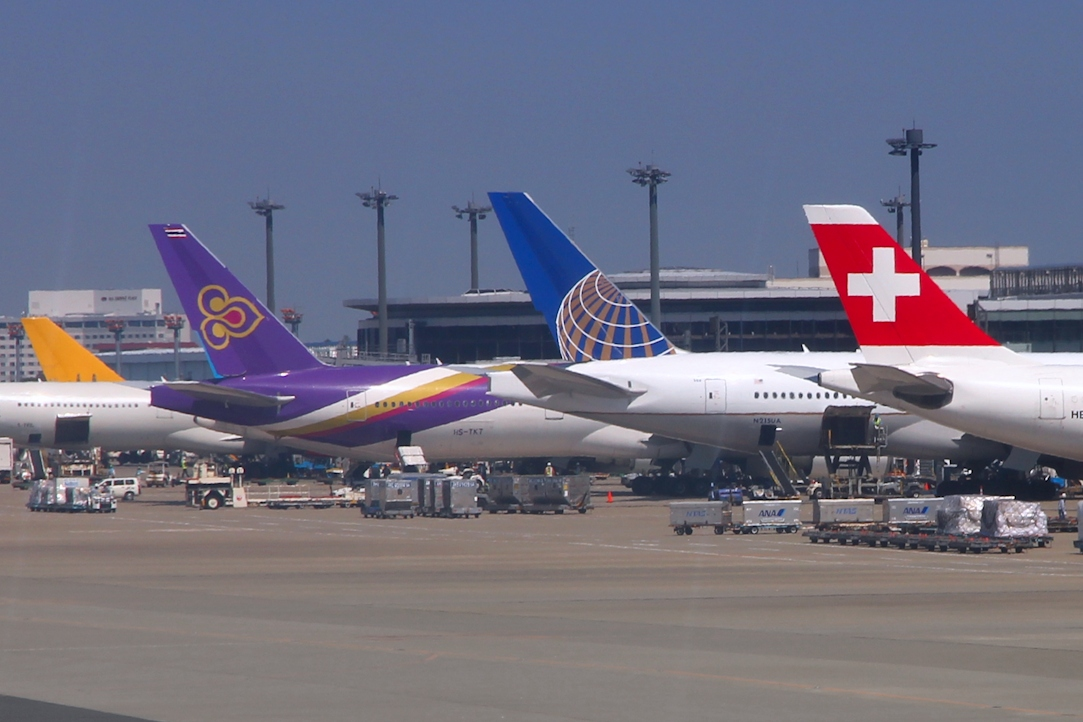
Variety of commercial airliners at Tokyo Narita Airport

Jet card programs are prepaid programs offered by private aviation companies, allowing customers to purchase a set number of flight hours on a specific aircraft or fleet. Jet card holders can use their hours to book flights, often with guaranteed availability and fixed hourly rates.

== Social and environmental impact ==
Air travel is a noted source of pollution, contributing about 2.4% of global CO_{2} emissions in 2018. Airline companies have become increasingly interested in corporate social responsibility (CSR) and environmental, social, and governance (ESG) issues.

While aviation is often taxed, most jurisdictions do not tax fuel for commercial aircraft.

In 2024, Air New Zealand, having previously set emissions reduction targets, cancelled these commitments.

== Radiation exposure ==
Exposure to ionizing radiation is higher in the upper atmosphere, and airline pilots are the fourth most exposed group of employees, with an average annual effective dose of 3 millisieverts (mSv). This is on top of the average effective dose of a typical person in the United States of 3.11 mSv from background sources, and well below the recommended limit of 20 mSv per year. Doses of less than 50 mSv over any time period are safe. (Note: See also Radiation hormesis.)

Radiation exposure is higher at higher altitudes, and higher in polar regions than in mid-latitude and equatorial regions.

== See also ==
- Airliner
- Flight level
- Direct flight
- Domestic flight
- International flight
- Mainline
- Non-stop flight
- Transport in the European Union
