= Airco DH.16 =

1919 biplane airliner by Airco

DH.16
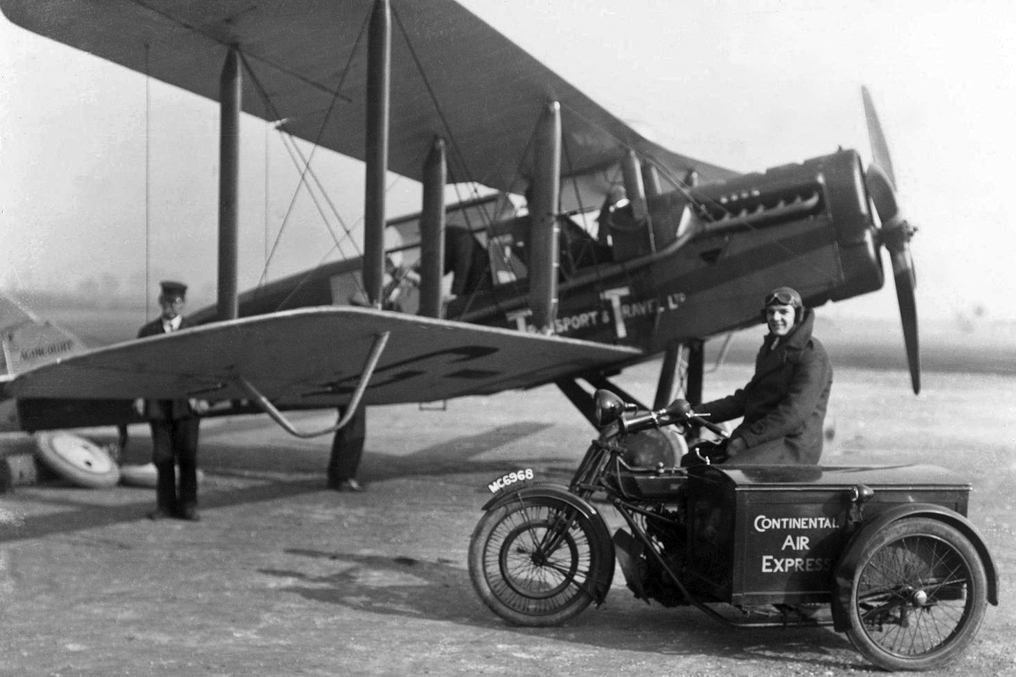
- DH.16 of Aircraft Transport & Travel

General information
- Type: commercial biplane
- Manufacturer: Airco
- Primary user: Aircraft Transport and Travel
- Number built: 9

History
- Introduction date: 1919
- First flight: 1919
- Retired: 1923

The Airco DH.16 was an early British airliner designed by Geoffrey de Havilland, the chief designer at Airco. It accommodated a pilot plus four passengers, and was operated from 1919 to 1923.

== Design and development ==
The DH.16 was a redesigned Airco DH.9A light bomber biplane with a wider fuselage, accommodating an enclosed cabin seating four passengers, plus the pilot in an open cockpit. In March 1919, the prototype first flew at Hendon Aerodrome. Nine aircraft were built, all but one being delivered to Airco's subsidiary Aircraft Transport & Travel Limited (AT&T).

== Operational history ==
AT&T used the first aircraft for pleasure flying, then on 25 August 1919 it was with this type of aircraft that AT&T operated the first regular (daily) international service in the world, from London-Hounslow Heath Aerodrome to Paris–Le Bourget Airport.

On 17 May 1920, an AT&T DH.16 (G-EALU) flew the first KLM service between Croydon Airport and Amsterdam Airport Schiphol.

In December 1920, AT&T closed down. One aircraft was sold to the River Plate Aviation Company in Argentina, to operate a cross-river service between Buenos Aires and Montevideo, and the other aircraft were stored. Two were later used for newspaper delivery flights, but on 10 January 1923 one of these suffered a fatal crash, and the remaining DH.16s were withdrawn and scrapped.

== Variants ==
The first six aircraft were powered by a 320 hp (239 kW) Rolls-Royce Eagle inline piston engine; the last three aircraft were fitted with the more powerful 450 hp (336 kW) Napier Lion engine.

== Operators ==
Argentina

- The River Plate Aviation Co. Ltd. – three aircraft c/n No 2, No 3 and P-4.

Netherlands

- KLM – services operated by Aircraft Transport and Travel aircraft.

United Kingdom

- Aircraft Transport and Travel Limited – all nine DH.16s operated from 1919 to 1922.
- De Havilland Aeroplane Hire Service – two former AT&T aircraft from 1922 to 1923.

== Specifications (DH.16 with Napier Lion engine) ==
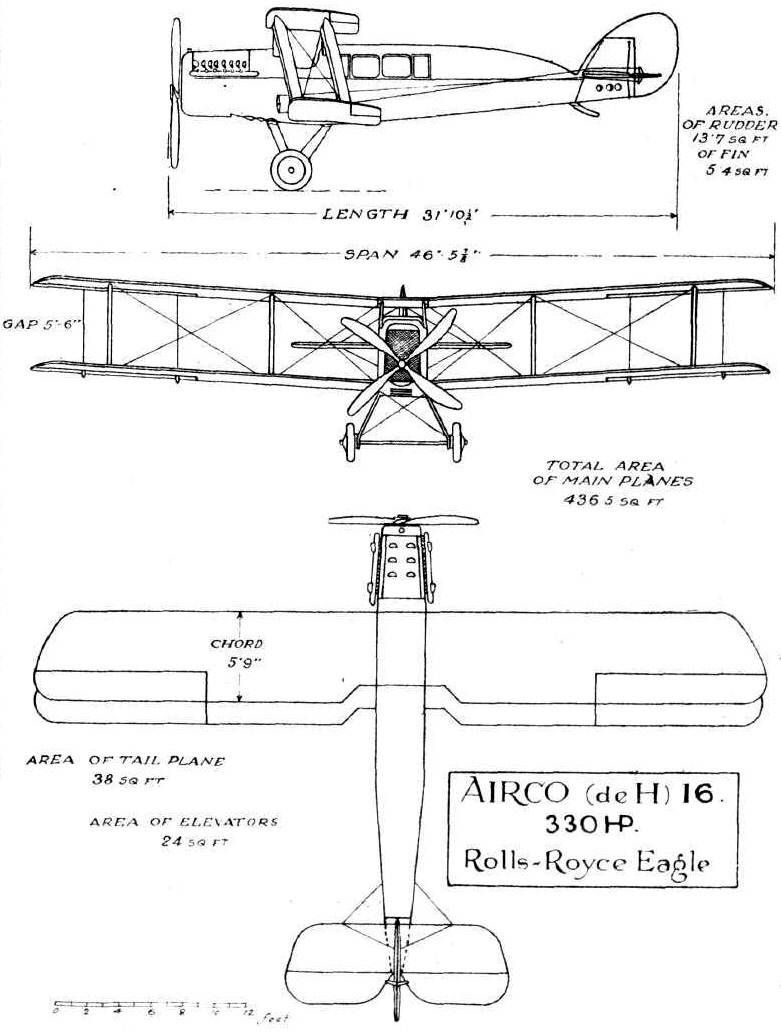
Three-view of Airco DH.16 with Rolls-Royce Eagle engine from Flight, 2 October 1919.

Data from De Havilland Aircraft since 1909

General characteristics

- Crew: One
- Capacity: Four passengers
- Length: 31 ft 9 in (9.68 m)
- Wingspan: 46 ft 5 7/8 in (14.170 m)
- Height: 11 ft 4 in (3.45 m)
- Wing area: 489 3/4 sq ft (45.50 m^{2})
- Empty weight: 3,155 lb (1,431 kg)
- Max takeoff weight: 4,750 lb (2,155 kg)
- Powerplant: 1 × Napier Lion 12-cylinder water-cooled W-block aircraft piston engine, 450 hp (340 kW)
- Propellers: 4-bladed wood fixed pitch propeller

Performance

- Maximum speed: 136 mph (219 km/h, 118 kn)
- Cruise speed: 100 mph (160 km/h, 87 kn)
- Range: 425 mi (684 km, 369 nmi)
- Service ceiling: 21,000 ft (6,400 m)
- Rate of climb: 1,000 ft/min (5.1 m/s)

== See also ==
- 1919 in aviation

Related development

- Airco DH.9A
- De Havilland DH.18

Aircraft of comparable role, configuration, and era

- BAT F.K.26
- Salmson 2 Limousine
- Vickers Vulcan
