= George Holt Thomas =

Aviation industry pioneer and newspaper proprietor (1869–1929)

- Born: 31 March 1869; Hampton House, Stockwell, London, England
- Died: 1 January 1929 (aged 59); Cimiez, near Nice, France
- Education: King's College School, London; The Queen's College, Oxford (left without earning degree)
- Occupations: newspaper publisher, aircraft manufacturer
- Years active: 1890–1920
- Organization(s): H.R. Baines and Co. Aircraft Manufacturing Company
- Board member of: Birmingham Small Arms Company (for a few days in March 1920)
- Spouse(s): Gertrude, née Oliver
- Parents: William Luson Thomas; Annie, née Carmichael
Old Bill
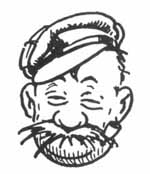
- Old Bill
- Author: Bruce Bairnsfather
- Launch date: 1914
- End date: 1915
- Publisher: Holt Thomas in The Bystander

George Holt Thomas (31 March 1869 – 1 January 1929) was an English aviation industry pioneer and newspaper proprietor. In 1911, Holt Thomas founded the business which became Aircraft Manufacturing Company Limited or Airco.

Son and grandson of successful artists, he initially followed his father into The Graphic and Daily Graphic newspaper business in 1890, later making his own name and fortune by founding The Bystander and Empire Illustrated magazines. He turned to aircraft in 1906.

== Background ==
George Holt Thomas was the seventh son of William Luson Thomas (1830–1890) and his wife Annie, daughter of John Wilson Carmichael. Born at Hampton House, Stockwell, south London, educated privately and at King's College School, London, he left Queen's College, Oxford, in 1890 after two years and without taking a degree. In 1894 he married Gertrude, daughter of architect Thomas Oliver of Newcastle upon Tyne; there were no children of the marriage.

== Newspapers ==
After Thomas left university in 1890 he joined his father's newspaper business as a director then became its general manager and later founded The Bystander with its comic strip character "Old Bill" and Empire Illustrated so making his own name and fortune.

== Aviation ==
During 1906 he turned his attention to aviation, recognising its extraordinary potential. He became associated with the Farman brothers Dick, Henri and Maurice Farman born in Paris of English parents involved with newspapers. Through the Farmans he engaged a French pilot, Louis Paulhan, to compete for the £10,000 prize Holt Thomas's friend Lord Northcliffe of the Daily Mail offered in 1906 for a successful flight from London to Manchester, a distance far greater than anyone had then flown. In April 1910 Paulhan won the prize.

=== Aircraft Manufacturing Company, Airco ===
In 1911, Holt Thomas formed Aircraft Manufacturing Company Limited to build French Farman aeroplanes and obtained licences to build French Gnome and Le Rhone engines. The Farman biplanes were used as trainers by the Royal Flying Corps. (Note: AIRCO Group included: The Gnome & Le Rhone Engine Co— Peter Hooker Limited, Integral Propeller Co. & May, Harden & May Ltd.)

=== De Havilland ===
Learning that Geoffrey de Havilland, then at the Royal Aircraft Factory in Farnborough, might be available, he invited de Havilland to join Airco as designer. His Airco designs, pre-fixed with his initials D.H., made up around 30% of all trainers, fighters and bombers used by Britain and the United States during the First World War.

== Civil aviation ==
By November 1918 and the armistice Holt Thomas was able to advertise that his was the largest aircraft company in the world. His companies built aeroplanes and their engines and propellers in large numbers and also airships and flying boats. He had the latest metal-working machinery, a laboratory for materials testing and a wind tunnel. Between 7,000 and 8,000 people were employed at Hendon. His companies turned out a new aircraft every 45 minutes. Hendon became a 'white elephant' which he endeavoured to sell to car manufacturers.

=== Aircraft Transport and Travel Limited ===
With an eye to the end of the war Holt Thomas formed Aircraft Transport & Travel Limited, sometimes erroneously called Aircraft Travel & Transport, which he registered on 5 October 1916. He was concerned that aviation had not been sufficiently seriously regarded before 1914 and the same should not be allowed to happen to civil aviation which would develop once peace was achieved. He painted word pictures of trunk routes through Britain and Ireland with links throughout Europe even to the United States and New Zealand through India and Australia.

When the armistice came Holt Thomas turned his considerable abilities to keeping his aviation business together and brought in Sefton Brancker, Francis Festing and Mervyn O'Gorman. Aircraft Transport & Travel began the world's first scheduled air service on 25 August 1919.

Holt Thomas's hopes for civil aviation were not at once realised. His Airco group of companies seemed near failure when he sold them into the BSA group's Daimler Hire Limited in February 1920. Finding the Airco group's financial circumstances much worse than they had understood BSA immediately placed most of Holt Thomas's business in the hands of a liquidator and BSA's holding company suffered very serious losses being obliged to pay no dividend for the four subsequent years. Holt Thomas was on the BSA board only a matter of days. Holt Thomas remained a tireless advocate of civil aviation.

Air Transport & Travel continued another eight months under the management of Frank Searle of Daimler Hire Limited within the BSA group. A T&T (Air Express) used the newest DH.18 eight-passenger aircraft introduced in April 1920 until November 1920 before it too was placed in liquidation.

Holt Thomas was able to assist Geoffrey de Havilland to purchase those assets he needed to form his own aircraft manufacturing business.

== Publications ==
Aerial Transport in 1920 and The Future of British Industry and Trade Unionism 1925 and many letters to the Editor of The Times.

== Retirement and death ==
The Royal Commission on Awards to Inventors whose inventions had been used during the war awarded him in 1925 a sum far more than any other industrialist received.

At his country home North Dean House, Hughenden, Buckinghamshire he took up the breeding of Friesian dairy cattle.

Holt Thomas died at Cimiez near Nice, France on 1 January 1929 in his 60th year following surgery in the hospital there.

"His kindness, charming and restrained manner, and quiet enthusiasm will always be remembered. No one who met him in those early days can visualize him as a business man but as an aviation enthusiast, keen on our progress from a national point of view... This pioneer was a great Englishman and his loss will be regretted by many."
Colonel G W Dawes, DSO, AFC The Times

== Legacy ==
He has been described as "an industrialist and visionary".
