= De Havilland DH.15 =

DH.15
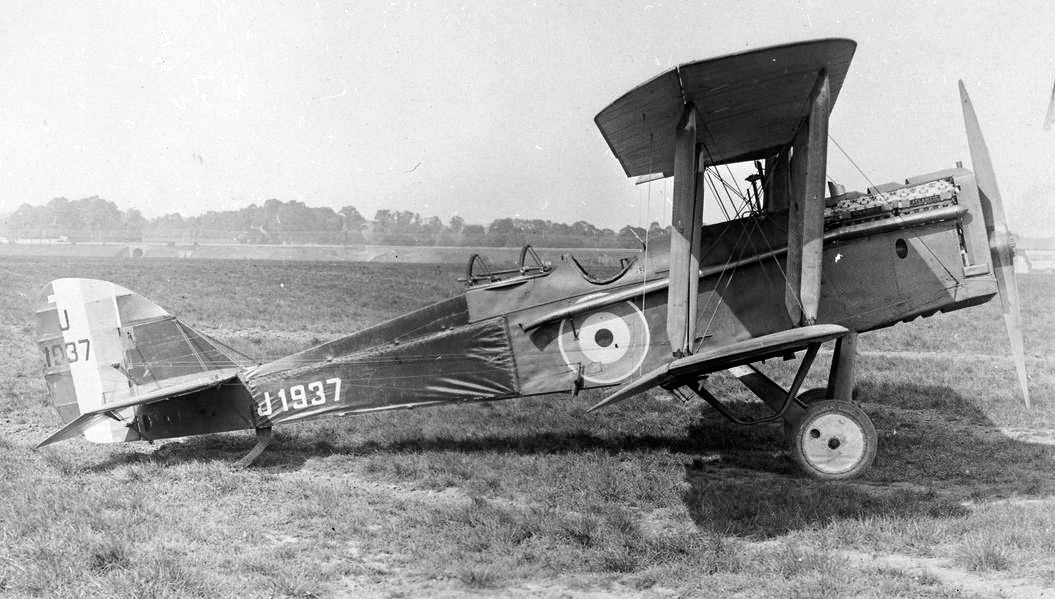

General information
- Type: Engine test bed
- National origin: United Kingdom
- Manufacturer: The Aircraft Manufacturing Co. Ltd.
- Status: abandoned
- Number built: 1

History
- Developed from: de Havilland DH.9A

The de Havilland DH.15 Gazelle was an engine testbed for the Galloway Atlantic engine, converted from a de Havilland DH.9A for flight trials in 1919–20. Only one was built.

== Development ==
The DH.15 Gazelle, more often known just as the DH.15, was a standard DH.9A, complete with original armament, converted for use as an engine testbed. The engine involved was the 500 hp (373 kW) Galloway Atlantic, a water-cooled V-12 unit produced by the Galloway Engineering Co., which merged two six-cylinder inline Galloway Adriatic engines onto a common crankcase. This replaced the DH.9A's standard 400 hp (300 kW) Liberty 12, although without a great change in appearance, as the Atlantic was mounted behind a similar large rectangular radiator. Both engines were upright V-12s, both with crankshafts near the base, and in each case, the propeller was mounted low on the nose. The exhaust pipes on the DH.15 were longer than the usual DH.9A set, running straight back from the upper sides of the engine, ending at the observer's cockpit.

Two DH.15s were ordered, but only one was built. It completed many flights with the Atlantic engine from 1919 to 1920.

== Specifications ==
Data from

General characteristics

- Crew: Two
- Length: 29 ft 11 in (9.12 m)
- Wingspan: 45 ft 11 3/8 in (14.005 m)
- Wing area: 486 3/4 sq ft (45.22 m^{2})
- Empty weight: 2,312 lb (1,049 kg)
- Gross weight: 4,773 lb (2,165 kg)
- Powerplant: 1 × Galloway Atlantic water-cooled V12 engine, 500 hp (370 kW)

Performance

- Maximum speed: 139 mph (224 km/h, 121 kn)
- Service ceiling: 20,000 ft (6,100 m)
- Rate of climb: 1,500 ft/min (7.6 m/s)

Armament

- Guns:
  - 1 × forward firing .303 in (7.7 mm) Vickers machine gun,
  - 1 × .303 in (7.7 mm) Lewis gun on Scarff ring
- Bombs: Up to 460 lb (210 kg) bombs
