= Airco DH.9 =

1917 bomber aircraft family by Airco

DH.9
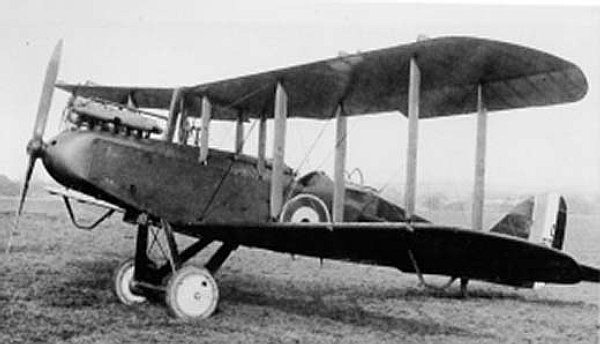
- Airco DH.9

General information
- Type: Bomber
- Manufacturer: Airco
- Designer: Geoffrey de Havilland
- Primary users: Royal Air Force Royal Flying Corps; Royal Naval Air Service; South African Air Force
- Number built: 4,091

History
- Introduction date: November 1917
- First flight: July 1917
- Retired: 1937
- Developed from: Airco DH.4
- Variants: Airco DH.9A; Airco DH.9C; Westland Walrus

The Airco DH.9 (from de Havilland 9) – also known after 1920 as the de Havilland DH.9 – is a British single-engined biplane bomber that was developed and deployed during the First World War.

The DH.9 was a development of Airco's earlier successful DH.4, with which it shared many components. These were mated to an all-new fuselage and used the Beardmore Halford Pullinger 230 hp (170 kW) engine, which promised increased performance. Anticipating its usefulness, the type was ordered in very large numbers for Britain's Royal Flying Corps (RFC).

Upon entering service, the DH.9's performance was found to be unsatisfactory. The BHP engine was unreliable and failed to provide the expected power, which gave the DH.9 less performance than the aircraft it had been meant to replace. The performance deficit was blamed for the heavy losses they suffered over the Western Front. The redesigned DH.9A was fitted with a more powerful and reliable American Liberty L-12 engine which rectified the shortcomings of the original DH.9 model.

== Development ==
=== Origins ===
During June 1917, partially as a result of attacks by German bombers on London, the War Office issued its recommendation to almost double the size of the Royal Flying Corps (RFC) to a total of 200 squadrons. In early July 1917, the British Cabinet accepted the recommendation, with the intention that the majority of the new squadrons were to be equipped with bombers. While an order for 700 DH.4s was placed on 28 June 1917, on 23 July 1917, the Air Board were presented with drawings for a modified DH.4 that delivered greater range under a new type number, DH.9.

The DH.9 was designed by de Havilland for the Aircraft Manufacturing Company in 1916 as a successor to the DH.4. It used the wings and tail unit of the DH.4 but featured a modified fuselage which moved the pilot closer to the gunner/observer and away from the engine and fuel tank, which facilitated communication and was a more optimal fighting configuration. The other major change from the DH.4 was the choice of the promising new B.H.P engine, which was predicted to produce 300 hp (220 kW) to provided performance matching enemy fighters.

Based on the performance estimates for the DH.9 (which were initially expected to surpass those of the DH.4), and the similarity to the DH.4, which meant that it would be easy to convert production over to the new aircraft, it was decided to place a massive number of orders (totalling 4,630 aircraft) for the type prior to the aircraft even flying for the first time. Existing contracts originally placed for the DH.4 were also converted to the DH.9. The Air Board had been specifically assured that there would be an initial production delay of no more than a month. According to aviation author J.M Bruce, the selection of the DH.9 "seems to have been taken in a spirit of optimism or blind faith, for its chosen engine was, in July 1917, experiencing serious manufacturing difficulties".

=== Into flight ===
In July 1917, the prototype (a converted DH.4) performed its maiden flight from Hendon Aerodrome, Colindale, London. Trials of the type were extensive, including a number of tests performed at RAF Martlesham Heath. Unfortunately, the BHP engine proved unable to reliably deliver its expected power; the engine having been de-rated to 230 hp (170 kW) in order to improve its reliability. This deficit had a drastic effect on the aircraft's performance, especially at high altitude, with it being inferior to that of the DH.4 it was supposed to replace.

The poor performance of the aircraft meant that the DH.9 would have to fight its way through enemy fighters, which could easily catch the DH.9 where the DH.4 could avoid many of these attacks. As early as November 1917, some officials, such as General Hugh Trenchard, raised repeated objections to the aircraft based upon its disappointing performance; however, in his response, President of the Air Council Sir William Weir started that "it was the choice of having the DH.9 with the B.H.P. engine, or of having nothing at all. Additionally, by this point, production of the DH.9 was already well underway.

BHP engines were produced by Siddeley-Deasy (developed as the Puma) and Galloway Engineering (developed as the Adriatic). In British military service both Siddeley and Galloway built engines were known as the 230 hp BHP although they had different dimensions and few interchangeable parts. The vast majority of BHP engines in service were built by Siddeley-Deasy.

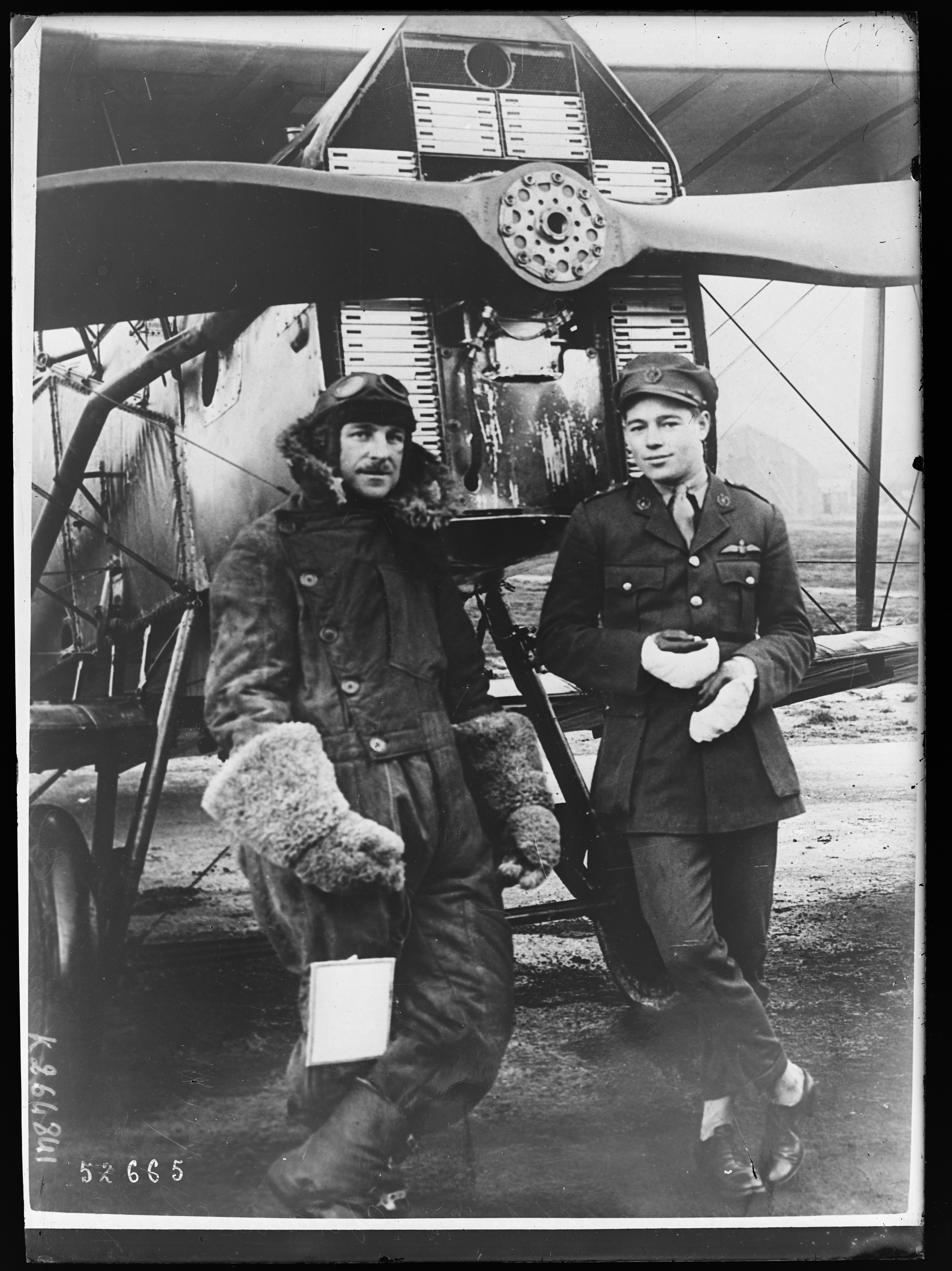
Captain Lang and Lieutenant Blowes in front of their World Altitude Record holding Napier Lion powered DH.9.

Multiple attempts were made to provide the DH.9 with a better engine. In August 1917, an order for 2,000 Fiat A.12 engines was placed, with delivery between January and June 1918 used on some production batches of the D.H9; however, deliveries of the Fiat engine were unsatisfactory.

An alternative powerplant was the 430 hp (320 kW) Napier Lion engine. A Napier Lion powered aircraft piloted by Captain Lang and his observer Lieutenant Blowes achieved a World Altitude Record of 30,500 ft (9,300 m) in 66 minutes on 2 January 1919. At 21,000 ft Lieutenant Blowes oxygen supply failed and he remained unconscious until the aircraft descended to 10,000 feet. Unaware of his observers plight Captain Lang was unable to exceed 30,500 feet because their oil heater failed and their fuel pumps cut out due to a lack of air pressure. Both men needed to be hospitalized after the attempt due to frostbite on their faces, hands, and feet.

However, none of these options were deemed to be entirely satisfactory, it required redesign into the DH.9A, for which an American V-12 Liberty engine was adopted. According to Bruce, aside from the engine issue: "Certainly, there was little wrong with the aircraft itself".

== Design ==
The Airco DH.9 was a single-engine British bomber aircraft, sharing a high level of similarities with the preceding DH.4. The standard flight surfaces were broadly the same, but adopted a highly redesigned fuselage configuration, including the repositioning of the pilot's cockpit to a more rearwards position. Structurally, the fuselage was similar to its predecessor; plywood cladding covered the forward fuselage, which had no internal bracing, while a conventional wire-braced box girder structure was used aft of the cockpits. Internal stowage for a pair of 230 lb (100 kg) or four 112 lb (51 kg) bombs was provided for, although little use of this capability was made operationally.

While the DH.9 was deemed to be suitable for daytime bombing operations, it was found to be incapable of effective nighttime bombing due to the pilot's view being obstructed and visibility via the bombsight being unsuitable. The revised cockpit positioning of the DH.9 from the DH.4 placed the pilot and the observer closer together, which was viewed by the RAF as being a considerable advantage in aerial combat; however, the pilot's visibility for ground reconnaissance was decreased as a result. Both radio sets and cameras could be installed. The fuel tanks were enclosed in doped fabric, intended to drain fuel away if the tanks were hit by enemy fire. According to the testing squadron, the DH.9 possessed a high level of manoeuvrability, was relatively easy to perform landings aside from a poor view during the approach.

Various improvements and supplementary equipment were trialled and occasionally adopted. Tests of various engines, radiators, silencers and parachutes were conducted to evaluate their performance, however, few of these improvements were ultimately adopted. During the war, numerous customisations and improvised improvements were made to the aircraft by the maintenance crews of individual squadrons, often for the purpose of addressing the type's engine performance issues. After the end of the war, many DH.9s, which had been originally delivered as bombers, were sold; these were often reconfigured to serve in different roles, including passenger and cargo transport, trainer aircraft, and as air ambulances.

== Operational history ==
=== First World War service ===
To boost the rate of production, quantity orders for the DH.9 were also placed with Alliance, G & J.Weir, Short Brothers, Vulcan, Waring & Gillow and National Aircraft Factories No. 1 and No. 2. The first deliveries of the type occurred during November 1917 to 108 Squadron RFC; by the end of 1917, a total of five DH.9s had been delivered and passed their final inspections. The first combat engagement of the type, performed over France, was performed in March 1918 by No. 6 Squadron RNAS. By July 1918, a total of nine operational squadrons deployed to the Western Front were using the type.

The DH.9's performance in action over the Western Front was typically deemed to have been a disaster; heavy losses of the type were quickly incurred, attributed to both its poor performance and to engine failures, despite the prior derating of its engine to reduce the failure rate. Between May and November 1918, a pair of squadrons stationed at the Western Front (Nos. 99 and 104) had 54 of its DH.9s shot down and another 94 aircraft written off due to accidents. On multiple occasions, less than half of a flight of bombers would reach their intended targets; according to Bruce, the successful missions performed by the DH.9 were frequently a product of "the courage and determination of the pilots and observers that flew them". Squadrons would often implement their own home-built enhancements to their aircraft, such as enlarged carburetor air intakes and modified fuel mixture controls.

Nevertheless, the type proved capable during some engagements; on 23 August 1918, a DH.9 flown by Lieutenant Arthur Rowe Spurling of 49 Squadron, with his observer, Sergeant Frank Bell, single-handedly attacked thirty Fokker D.VII fighters, downing five of them. On 9 August 1918, Lieutenant E.A. Simpson of 49 Squadron, while flying a bombing mission upon bridges at Falvy and Bethencourt, shot down four hostile fighters while defending against repeated attacks upon the formation. In another instance, Captain John Stevenson Stubbs achieved 11 aerial victories in a DH.9, including the highly unusual feat of balloon busting while flying the type.

Despite its general lack of performance, due to its large numbers, the DH.9 was introduced to nearly every theatre of the conflict prior to the signing of the Armistice of 11 November 1918, which ended the conflict. Reportedly, the DH.9 was also more successful in combat against the Turkish forces in the Middle East, where they faced less aerial opposition. Stationed at coastal aerodromes across the British mainland, the type was also used extensively to perform coastal patrol missions with the aim of deterring the operations of enemy U-boats.

=== Post war service ===
Following the end of the First World War, a number of DH.9s operated by 47 Squadron and 221 Squadron were sent to southern Russia in 1919 in support of the White Russian Army of General Denikin, participating in the Russian Civil War. In this theatre, the aircraft were often operating in challenging conditions.

The last combat use of the DH.9 by the RAF was in support of the final campaign against haroun members such as Ismail Mire, Muhammad Abdulla and Diiriye Guure in Waqooyi Bari during January–February 1920. Amongst the aircraft used in Somalia, one DH.9 was modified to function as an air ambulance, being able to load and transport a single stretcher, which was carried on the upper longerons directly to the rear of the pilot's cockpit. Further ambulance conversions were performed, including a number that were operated by the Royal Netherlands Air Force.

Production was allowed to continue after the end of the war into 1919. In 1920, the DH.9 was finally withdrawn from service by the RAF. In addition to British manufacturing, several other countries had commenced production of the type; perhaps the most significant of these was the Airco DH.9A, which was fitted with the American V-12 Liberty engine, produced in the thousands even though production was curtailed by the signing of the Armistice that had ended the First World War. Belgium and Spain also produced the type, the latter producing hundreds of the type equipped with a 300 hp (220 kW) Hispano-Suiza engine; some of these were still in service in 1940.

Following the end of the conflict, large numbers of surplus DH.9s became available at low prices and the type was widely exported. This included aircraft donated to the Dominions and India as part of the Imperial Gift programme. The South African Air Force (SAAF) received a total of 48 DH.9s, and used them extensively, including against the Rand Revolt in 1922. Several South African aircraft were later re-engined with Bristol Jupiter radial engines as the M′pala; such modified aircraft continued to serve until 1937.

Possibly the last battle use by any user was in late 1922, during the Turkish War of Independence. Greeks had deployed a number of them against the Kemalists who were fighting the British supported Greek Army invading the remaining chunk of the Ottoman Empire after the 1918 Armistice of Mudros followed by the Sevres Treaty which was rejected by the nationalists. One of Greek DH.9s had made a forced landing behind Turkish lines near Muğla during the Battle of Sakarya the previous year, sometime in July 1921. This machine was quickly repaired and was flown to Ankara in August 1921 by Vecihi Hürkuş. It was named "Ismet" and deployed, as the only Turkish airplane at the time, in the last phases of the Battle of Sakarya, making a total of 23 sorties, mostly by Vecihi. Same airplane continued to serve for the remaining of the War of Independence through 1922. There were three more Greek DH.9s found in excellent condition, with plenty of spare parts, near İzmir after the Greek army pulled out hurriedly, having been routed by Kemalists in August 1922. These four planes served the young Turkish Air Force until 1925.

The Irish Free State purchased surplus six DH.9s from the Aircraft Disposal Company, received in January–February 1923. They were used for reconnaissance, army support and protection of railways during the last few months of the Irish Civil War. The DH.9 remained in Irish service into the 1930s.

=== Civilian service ===
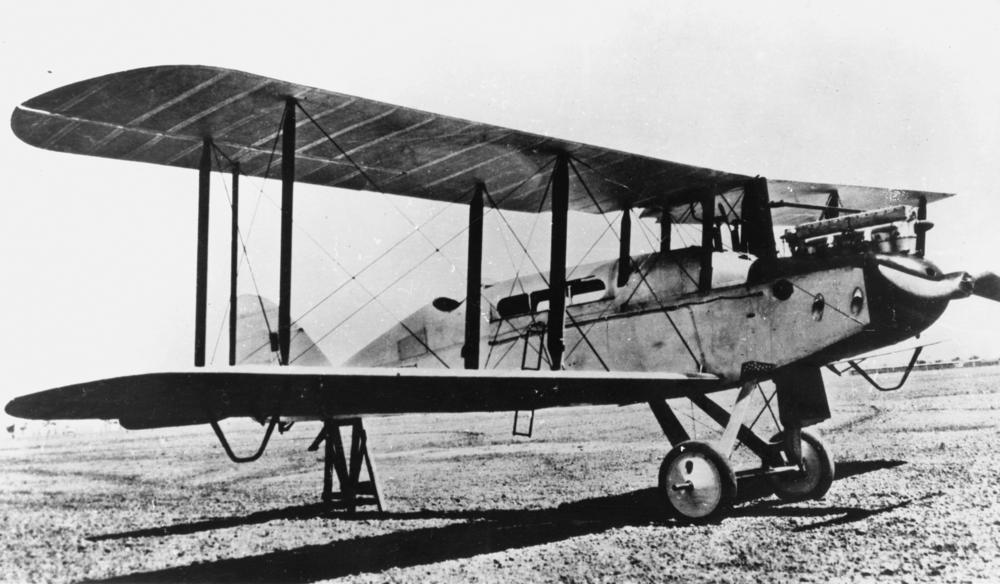
DH-9 G-AUED modified with a cabin for use as an airliner

After the end of the war, large numbers of surplus DH.9s became available, having been deemed to be surplus to requirements by their original military operators; accordingly, many were resold onto civil operators, such as by early aerial transport companies. Large numbers were modified to better perform as transport aircraft, such as the cabin being suitably adapted for the carriage of passengers. In this role, the DH.9 provided a useful load carrying capability and was relatively inexpensive to procure. Accordingly, in various configurations, the type saw prolific use by civil operators.

Early air services between London, Paris and Amsterdam were operated by a fleet of DH.9s owned by Aircraft Transport and Travel. A number of DH9s were converted into floatplanes and saw use in India, Bolivia and Rhodesia. Several aircraft were reconfigured to serve as trainer aircraft, being refitted with Armstrong Siddeley Jaguar engines and rubber undercarriages; designated as DH.9Js, the last of these were withdrawn and scrapped in 1936.

A number of different DH.9 conversion programmes for civil use were carried out, both by Airco and its successor, the de Havilland Aircraft Company, and by other third party companies, such as the Aircraft Disposal Company. Some radial powered DH.9Js continued in civil use until 1936. One DH.9 was transported to Japan during the Sempill Mission. A large number of DH.9s were also apparently exported to China according to the Aircraft Disposal Company.

== Variants ==
- DH.9 – Revised version of the DH.4 with the pilot and observer/gunner placed closer together (3,024 production aircraft built with others built in Belgium and Spain).
- DH.9A – (also referred to as the Nine-Ack) was designed for Airco by Westland Aircraft to take advantage of the 400 hp (300 kW) American Liberty L-12 engine. Apart from the new engine and slightly larger wings it was identical to the DH.9. Initially it was hoped to quickly replace the DH.9 with the new version, but the shortage of Liberty engines available to the RAF limited the new type's service in the First World War, and it is best known as a standard type in the postwar RAF, serving as a general purpose aircraft for several years. 2,300 DH.9As were built by ten different British companies.
- DH.9B – Conversions for civilian use as three-seaters (one pilot and two passengers)
- DH.9C – Conversions for civilian use as four-seaters (one pilot and three passengers)
- DH.9J – Modernised and re-engined conversions using the 385 hp (287 kW) Armstrong Siddeley Jaguar III radial engine. Used by the De Havilland School of Flying.

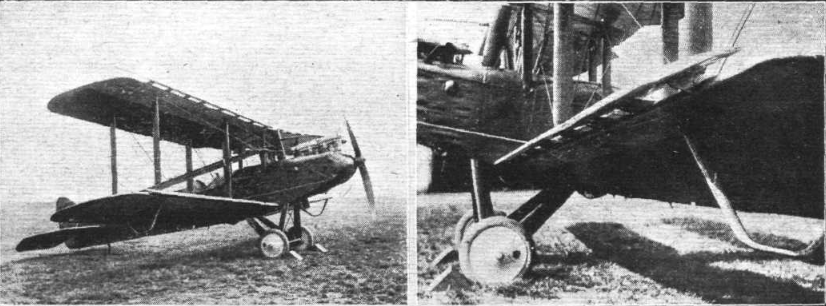
Handley Page H.P. 17 showing slots

- DH.9J M'pala I – Re-engined conversions carried out by the South African Air Force. Powered by a 450 hp (340 kW) Bristol Jupiter VI radial piston engine.
- M'pala II – Re-engined conversions carried out by the South African Air Force, powered by a 480 hp (360 kW) Bristol Jupiter VIII radial piston engine.
- Mantis – Re-engined conversions carried out by the South African Air Force, powered by a 200 hp (150 kW) Wolseley Viper piston engine.
- Handley Page HP.17 – A DH.9 experimentally fitted with slotted wings, tested 1920–1.
- USD-9/9A – DH.9s manufactured in the United States by the US Army's Engineering Division and Dayton-Wright. (1,415 ordered, only four built)

== Operators ==
=== Military operators ===
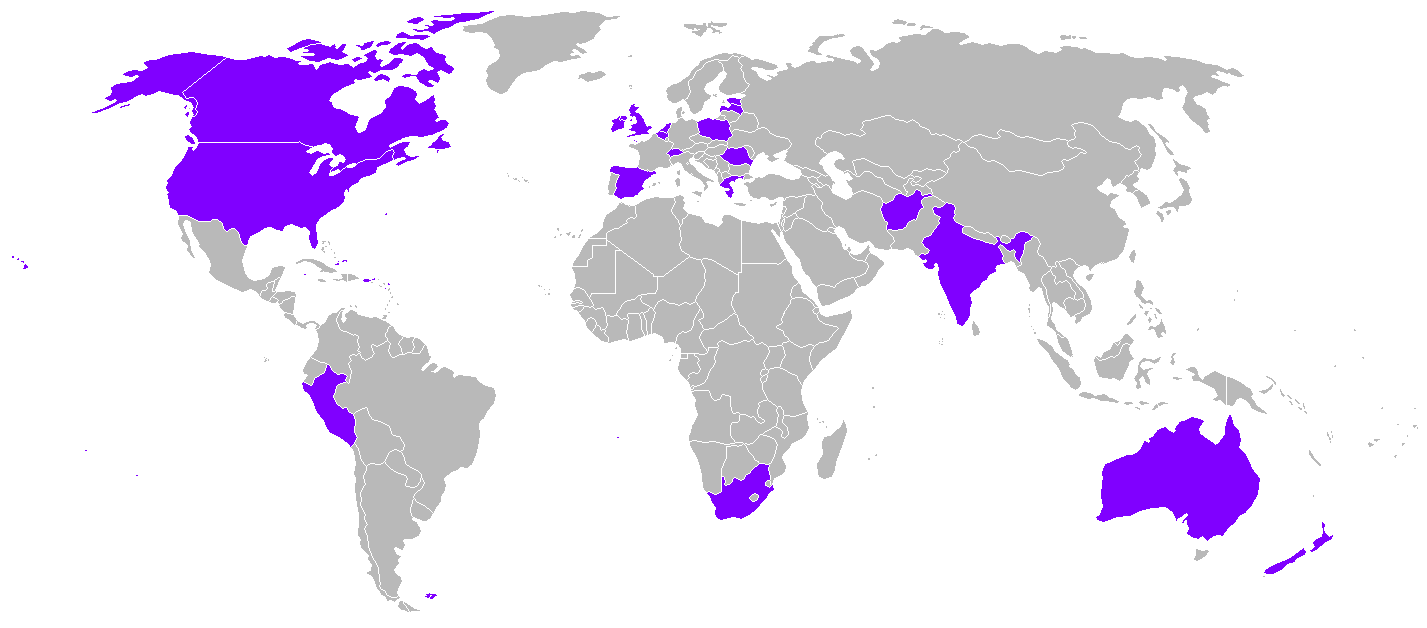
DH.9 operators

Afghanistan

- Afghan Air Force – 18 aircraft, including 16 built by Duks Aircraft Works, acquired from 1924.

Australia

- Royal Australian Air Force – One used by the RAAF from 1920 to 1929.
  - No. 1 Flying Training School RAAF

Belgium

- Belgian Air Force – 18 aircraft.

Canada

- Canadian Air Force

Bolivia

- Bolivian Air Force

Chile

- Chilean Air Force – Received 20.

Estonia

- Estonian Air Force operated 13 from 1919 to 1933 .

India

(Part of Imperial Gift)

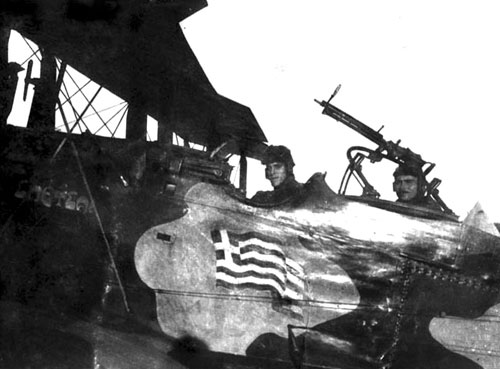
Greek DH-9

Greece

- Royal Hellenic Naval Air Service

Kingdom of Hejaz

- Hejaz Air Force – The Kingdom of Hejaz received 9 DH.9s and 2 DH.9Cs between 1921 and 1924. Five remained in existence (although not airworthy) in 1932.

Ireland

- Irish Air Service
- Irish Air Corps

Latvia

- Latvian Air Force

Netherlands

- Royal Netherlands East Indies Army Air Force – operated 36, some of which were re-engined with Pratt & Whitney Wasp radial engine withdrawn in 1934.

New Zealand

- Royal New Zealand Air Force – Three Airco DH.9s in service with the New Zealand Permanent Air Force from 1923 to 1929 as advanced training aircraft.

Paraguay

- Paraguayan Air Force

Peru

- Peruvian Air Force

Poland

- Polish Air Force – 20 received in 1920, used during the Polish-Soviet war, until 1929.

Romania

- Royal Romanian Air Force

Kingdom of Spain

- Spanish Air Force

South Africa

- South African Air Force – Part of the Imperial Gift. Some locally modified with Jupiter engines and named Mpala.

Soviet Union

- Soviet Air Force

Switzerland

- Swiss Air Force

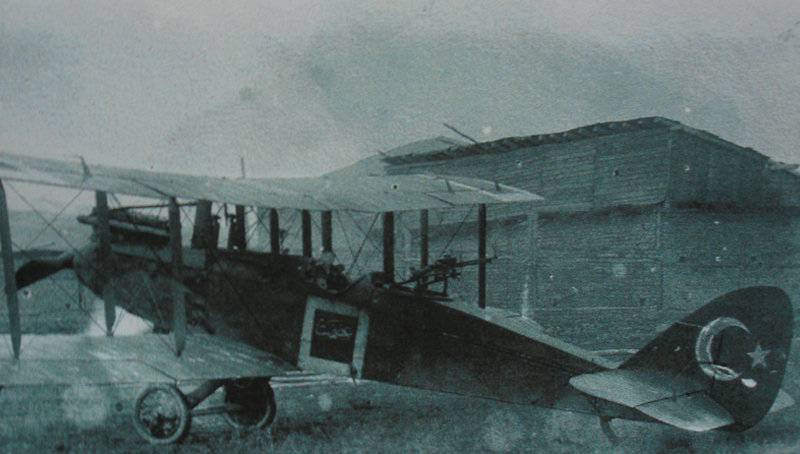
Turkish DH-9

Turkey

- Turkish Air Force – four aircraft, in service from 1921 to 1924.

United Kingdom

- Royal Flying Corps
- Royal Naval Air Service
- Royal Air Force

United States

- American Expeditionary Force
- United States Marine Corps

Uruguay

- Uruguayan Air Force

=== Civil operators ===
Australia

- Qantas

Belgium

- Sabena
- SNETA

Denmark

- Det Danske Luftfartselskab

Netherlands

- KLM

Romania

- SNNA

Kingdom of Spain

- Cia Espanola del Trafico Aereo

United Kingdom

- Aircraft Transport and Travel
- Handley Page Transport

Bikaner State

- Maharaja Ganga Singh

== Surviving aircraft ==
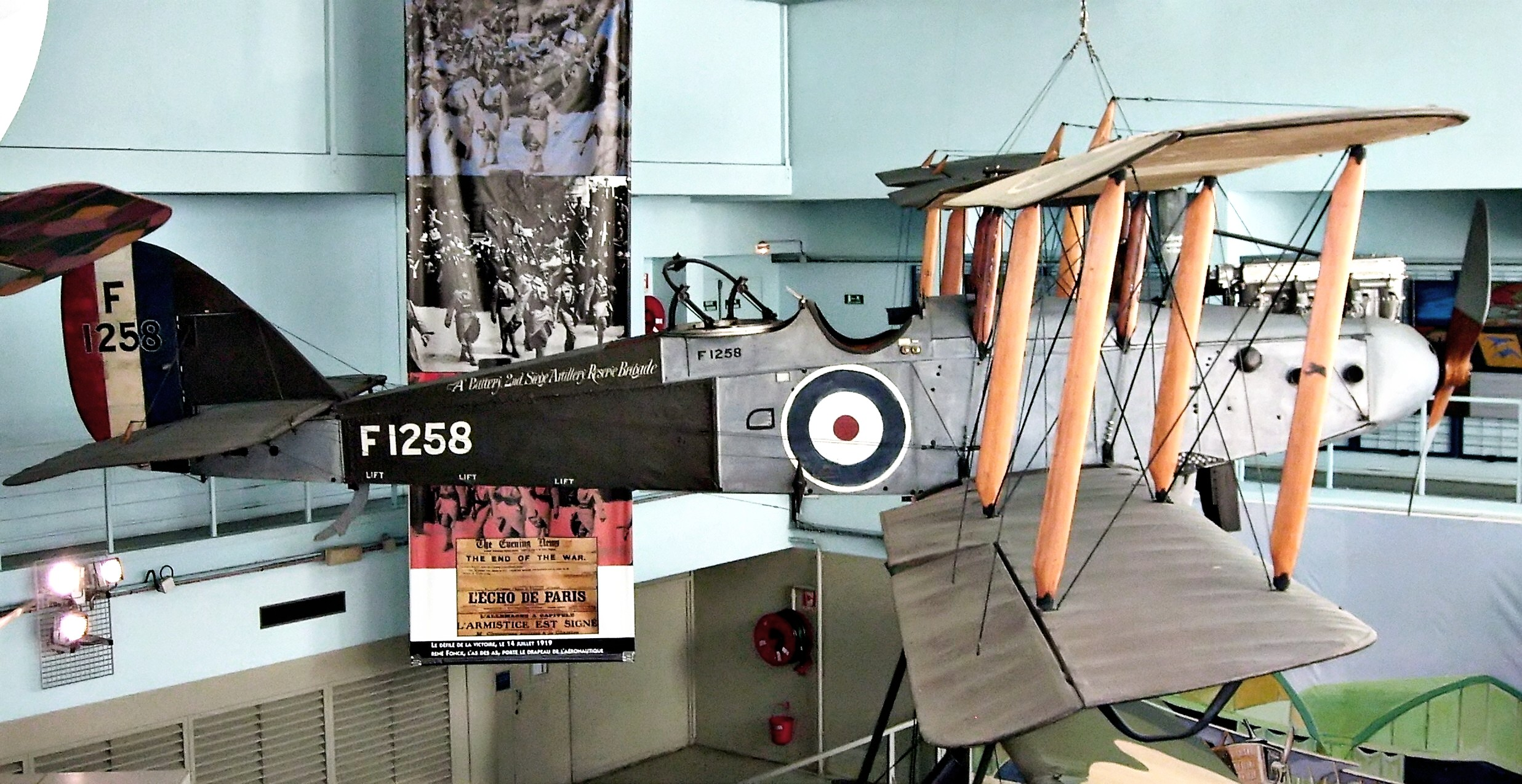
DH.9 F1258 at the Musée de l'Air et de l'Espace, Paris Le Bourget

Of the thousands of DH.9s built, only a few survived to be preserved:

- F1258 is displayed at the Musée de l'Air et de l'Espace in Paris,
- An original DH.9 is displayed without serial number at the South African National Museum of Military History. This DH.9 flew with the South African Air Force after World War I, then was operated as a civilian aircraft as ZS-AOI, before returning to the SAAF.
- G-EAQM (original RAF serial F1278) was the first single-engined aircraft to fly from the United Kingdom to Australia and is preserved at the Australian War Memorial in Canberra.

In 2000, the remains of three DH.9s were discovered in India and two were retrieved for restoration in the UK. Of these,

- D5649 was restored and is displayed at the Imperial War Museum, Duxford.
- E8894/G-CDLI was restored to airworthy condition and is operated as a warbird by the Historic Aircraft Company in England.
- The third was retained in India and restored to a somewhat less-than-faithful condition for display at Junagarh Fort in the city of Bikaner, Rajasthan.

== Specifications (DH.9 (Puma Engine)) ==
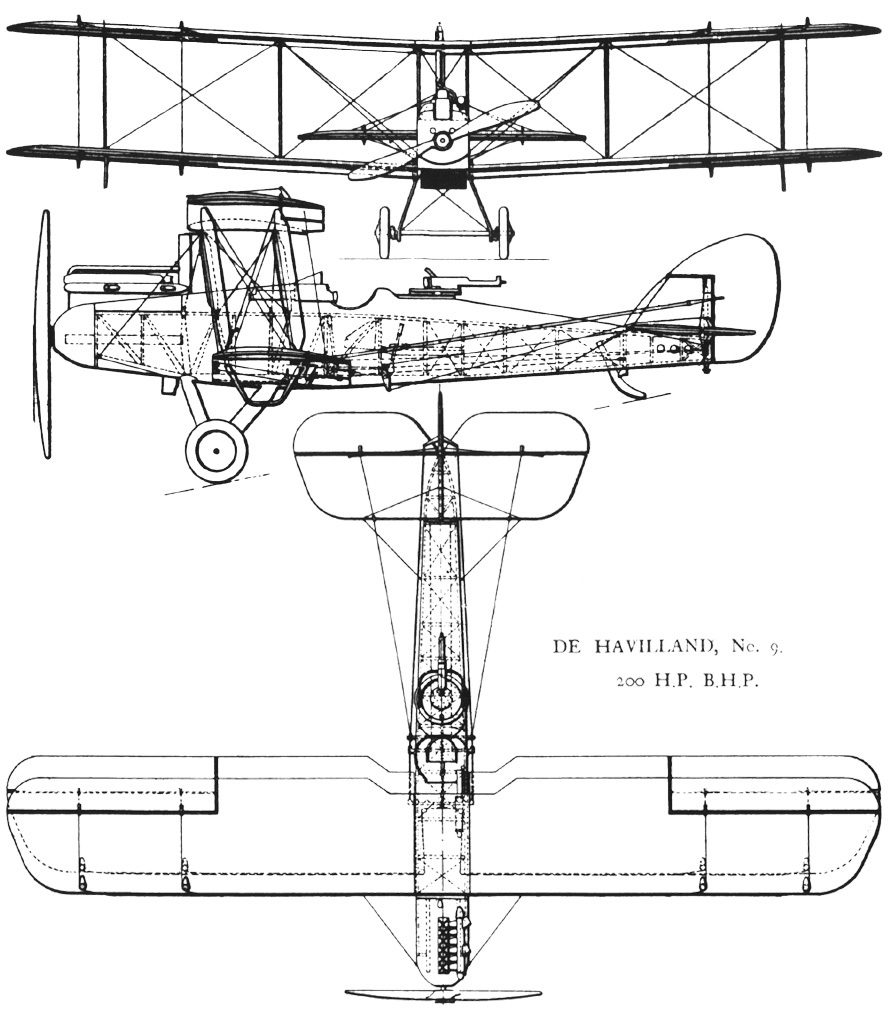
Airco DH.9 drawing

Data from The British Bomber since 1914, Aircraft Profile No. 62: The de Havilland D.H.9

General characteristics

- Crew: two
- Length: 30 ft 5 in (9.27 m)
- Wingspan: 42 ft 4 5/8 in (12.919 m)
- Height: 11 ft 3 1/2 in (3.442 m)
- Wing area: 434 sq ft (40.3 m^{2})
- Airfoil: RAF-16
- Empty weight: 2,360 lb (1,070 kg)
- Gross weight: 3,790 lb (1,719 kg)
- Powerplant: 1 × Armstrong Siddeley Puma 6 cylinder inline piston engine, 230 hp (170 kW)

Performance

- Maximum speed: 113 mph (182 km/h, 98 kn)
- Endurance: 4+1/2 hours
- Service ceiling: 15,500 ft (4,700 m)
- Time to altitude: 18 min 30 sec to 10,000 ft (3,000 m)

Armament

- Guns: Forward firing .303 in (7.7 mm) Vickers machine gun and 1 or 2 × .303 in (7.7 mm) Lewis guns on scarff ring in rear cockpit
- Bombs: Up to 460 lb (210 kg) bombs

== See also ==
Related development

- Airco DH.4
- Airco DH.9A

Aircraft of comparable role, configuration, and era

- Breguet 14
