= Hounslow Heath Aerodrome =

Former airfield in London, England

Coordinates: 51°27′41″N 000°23′20″W

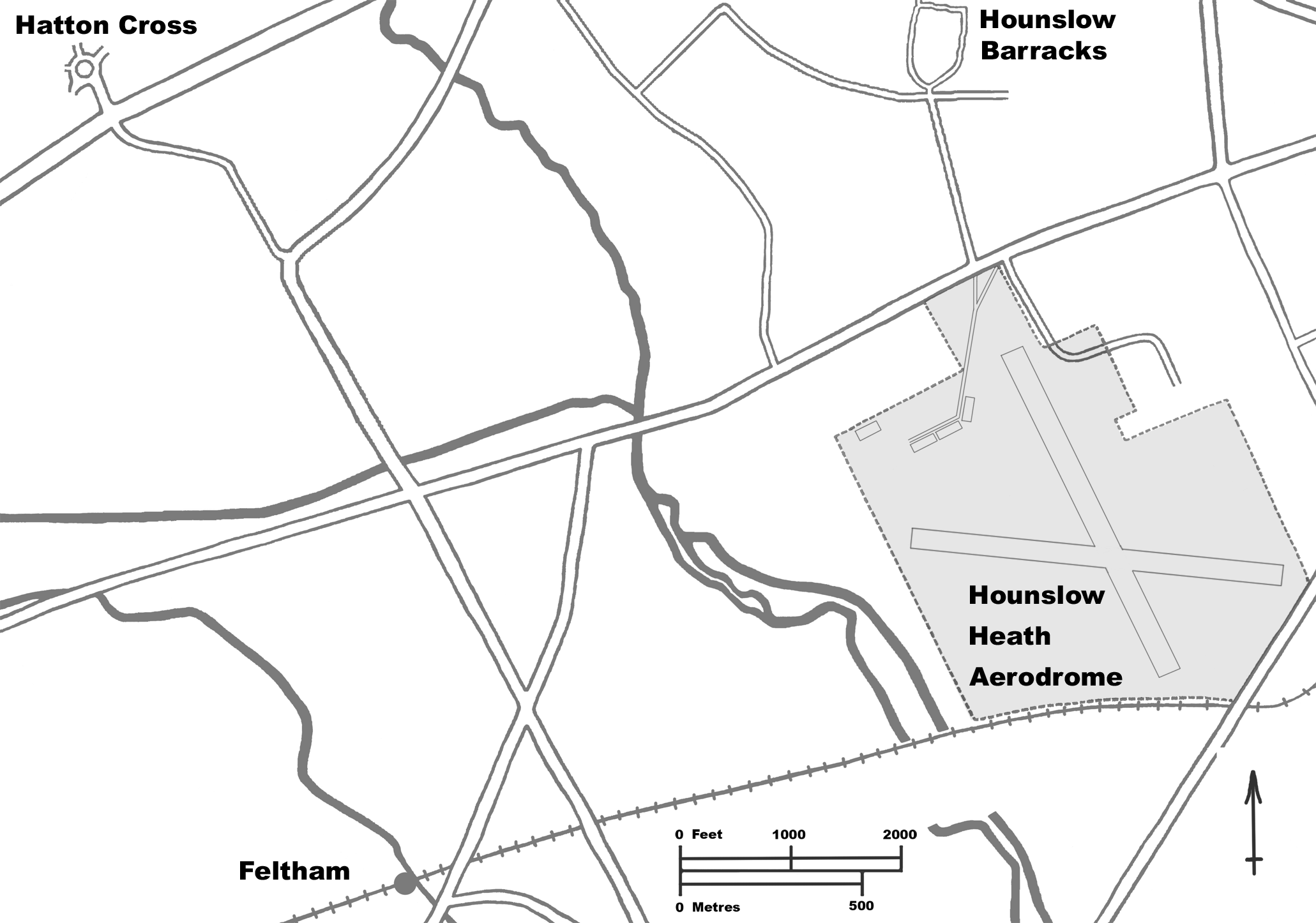
Hounslow Heath Aerodrome 1918 overlaid on 2011 roads

Hounslow Heath Aerodrome was a grass airfield, operational 1914–1920. It was in the London borough of Hounslow, and hosted the British Empire's first scheduled daily international commercial flights, in 1919. The site today includes the main remaining part of Hounslow Heath.

The last commercial flights took place in 1920, after which services moved to Croydon Airport.

Hounslow Heath Aerodrome is not to be confused with Great West Aerodrome, which opened nearby in 1929, and which is now Heathrow Airport.

== Earlier use of the site ==
A British army cavalry unit had been based since 1793 at Hounslow Barracks, centred 500 metres north of the site, regularly using most of Hounslow Heath for training exercises. Nine years before for the first precision mapmaking and surveying it saw General Roy's Baseline measured from one end of the heath to the other. The act marked a key stage in the Principal Triangulation of Great Britain and was repeated with greater precision on later occasions.

== 1910-1920 ==
- 1909: First reported landing by aircraft on the heath.
- Early 1910: A hangar was built, to support proposed flying training for army officers.
- Up to 1914: Several landings and departures were reported.

== World War I ==
- 14 October 1914: Ten days after the outbreak of World War I, the Royal Flying Corps (RFC) delivered two B.E.2c aircraft by air from Brooklands aerodrome to what remained of the historic heath. The RFC progressively increased its presence on the heath.
- March 1915: About 200 military personnel were receiving intensive training there. From then, the aerodrome was used for home defence, primarily against the threat of Zeppelin military airships, combined with development of pilots, aircraft and squadrons ready for transfer to battlefronts in France.
- 30 March 1915: 10 Squadron RFC moved in from Farnborough Airfield.
- May 1915: 10 Squadron RFC was replaced by 14 Squadron.
- August 1915: 14 Squadron RFC was replaced by 15 Squadron. All three squadrons were equipped with B.E.2cs.
- 1 September 1915: 24 Squadron was formed at Hounslow Heath, commanded by Major Lanoe Hawker VC. It was the first single-seat fighter RFC squadron, first equipped with various types such as Bristol Scout and Vickers F.B.5, then it standardised on Airco D.H.2s.
- 29 January 1916: No. 19 Training Squadron was formed at Hounslow Heath - the station's first dedicated training unit.
- February 1916: 24 Squadron departed to France.
- 5 November 1915: 27 Squadron was formed, using Martinsyde Elephant fighters.
- 15 April 1916: 39 Squadron was formed at Hounslow Heath from No. 19 Training Squadron, starting with B.E.2cs.
- 15 May 1916: 52 Squadron was formed at Hounslow Heath, starting with B.E.2cs.
- November 1917: 85 Squadron commanded by Billy Bishop was briefly based there, equipped with S.E.5As.
- December 1917: 87 Squadron was briefly based there, equipped with S.E.5As.
- 1 April 1918: The RFC and the Royal Naval Air Service were merged to form the Royal Air Force. The buildings at Hounslow Heath included four permanent hangars and several Bessonneau canvas hangars, and based aircraft included Sopwith Dolphins, Sopwith Snipes and Avro 504s. Training and communications squadrons of the RAF continued to use Hounslow Heath.

== Civilian activities 1919-1920 ==
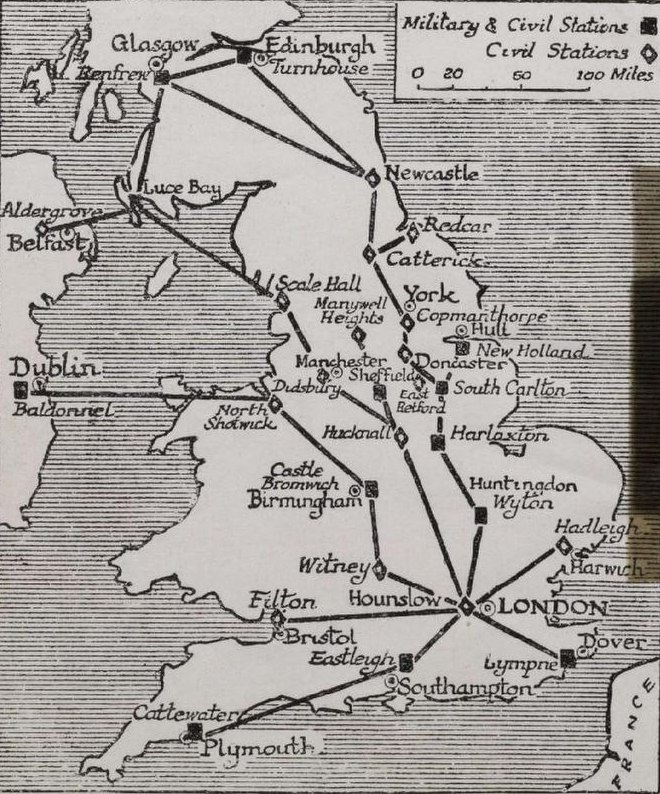
"Map of Air Routes and Landing Places in Great Britain, as temporarily arranged by the Air Ministry for civilian flying", published in 1919, showing Hounslow as the hub of the network.

- 1 May 1919: The ban on non-military flying was lifted. One incoming flight to Hounslow Heath from Bristol, plus one outgoing flight to Lympne Airport, both charters, became the first UK commercial flying journeys between 'appointed' aerodromes.
- 1 June 1919: The RAF vacated the airfield, and handed it over to civilian control.
- 1919: During that first year of civilian operations, several thousand passengers were carried on 'joy flights'. Those flights often employed de-mobbed and modified Avro 504s, operated in military markings but with the name of the owners, e.g. Avro, added in large lettering. Two of the former RFC permanent hangars were used to house civilian aircraft. The third hangar, nearest to the entrance road from Staines Road, was converted into a customs hall, with prominent external lettering 'Douane' and 'Customs' visible to air and ground visitors.
- 14 July 1919: The first international commercial flight arrived in the form of a Caudron aircraft piloted by Etienne Poulet, carrying photos from Paris – Le Bourget Airport, in accordance with inter-government agreements celebrating the Treaty of Versailles. At that time, Hounslow Heath was the only approved aerodrome in the London area with customs facilities. In the following five weeks, various proving flights took place, sometimes without customs clearances or passports.
- 25 August 1919: Several flights inaugurated scheduled international commercial flights. The first was by an Airco DH.4A (G-EAJC) owned by Aircraft Transport and Travel (AT&T) and piloted by E.H. 'Bill' Lawford. That flight carried journalists, newspapers and various goods to Paris. The same day, incoming and outgoing proving flights were operated by Handley Page, typically using O/400 aircraft. The first daily international service departed later in the day to Le Bourget, with an Airco DH.16 (K-130) of AT&T, piloted by Cyril Patterson.
- 30 September 1919: North Sea Aerial Navigation Co Ltd started a regular passenger service between Roundhay Park (Leeds) and Hounslow Heath, using Blackburn Kangaroos. Services were later extended to Amsterdam.
- Afterwards:Handley Page continued to operate London-Paris passenger services from its private Cricklewood Aerodrome, in competition with AT&T from Hounslow Heath. Handley Page had to land its aircraft at Hounslow Heath to embark or disembark passengers for customs clearance, until:-
- 17 February 1920: Customs facilities were provided at Cricklewood.
- 7 October 1919: British Aerial Transport Company (BAT) started a Hendon-Hounslow-Amsterdam service using BAT F.K.26s, then on 13 October Instone Air Line started a Cardiff-Hounslow-Paris service, using Airco DH.4s. Services were also operated by Compagnie des Messageries Aériennes (CMA) and Compagnie Générale Transaériennes (CGT) using Breguet 14.A2s.

== England to Australia flight ==
In 1919 the Australian government offered a prize of £10,000 for the first Australians in a British aircraft to fly from Great Britain to Australia. The departure points were defined as either Hounslow Heath Aerodrome (for landplanes) or RNAS Calshot, near Southampton (for seaplanes and flying boats).

| Takeoff date | Plane | Crew | End date | Result |
|---|---|---|---|---|
| 21 October 1919 | Sopwith Wallaby (G-EAKS) | Captain George Campbell Matthews AFC as pilot, Sergeant Thomas D. Kay as mechanic | 17 April 1920 | Crashed on landing on Bali (after many problems and delays). |
| 12 November 1919 | Vickers Vimy (G-EAOU) | Captain Ross Macpherson Smith, his brother Lieutenant; Keith Macpherson Smith, two mechanics | 10 December 1919 | Arrived at Darwin, and won the crew the £10,000 prize. |
| 13 November 1919 | Alliance P.2 Seabird (G-EAOX) named 'Endeavour' | Captain Roger M. Douglas, Lieutenant J.S.L. Ross | 13 November 1919 | Crashed at Surbiton with loss of both pilots. |
| 21 November 1919 | Blackburn Kangaroo (G-EAOW) | Lieutenant Valdemar Rendle & Lieutenant D.R. Williams, plus Captain Hubert Wilkins & Lieutenant G. St. C. Potts | 8 December 1919 | Crashed on landing at Suda Bay, Crete. |
| 5 December 1919 | Martinsyde Type A Mk.I (G-EAMR) | Captain Cedric E. Howell, Lieutenant George Fraser | 9 December 1919 | Plane disappeared near Corfu; the wreckage and Howell's body were found offshore, but Fraser's body was never found. |
| 8 January 1920 | Airco DH.9 (G-EAQM) | Lieutenant Ray Parer, Lieutenant John C. McIntosh | 2 August 1920 | Arrived at Darwin after 206 days; £A1,000 consolation prize. |

== Decline ==
- 27 March 1920: The last commercial flights took place at the heath, and AT&T moved its operations to Croydon Airport.
- 28 March 1920: Croydon Airport supplanted Hounslow Heath to become the approved airport serving London. The army then repossessed the land for use as a repair depot and training school.
- A few aircraft demonstrations and occasional landings took place on the heath into the mid-1930s

== Today ==
Hounslow Heath has largely reverted to an undeveloped public open space and nature reserve. There are also several memorials to the aerodrome.
