= Airco DH.9A =

1918 bomber aircraft by Airco

DH.9A
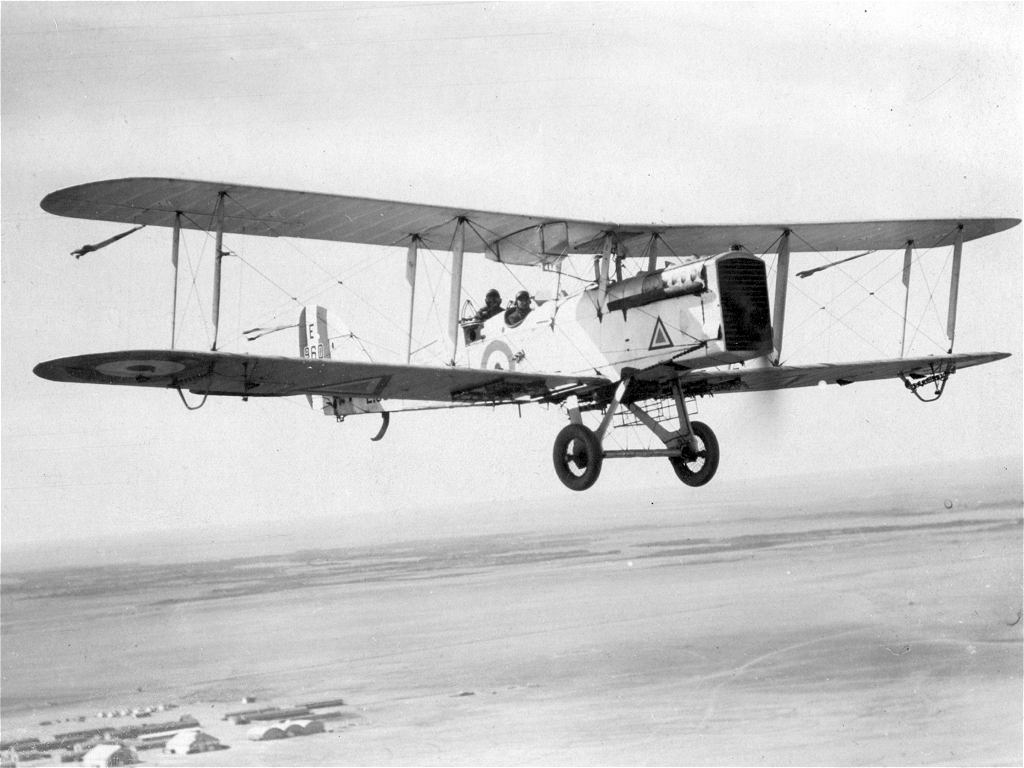
- Airco D.H.9A

General information
- Type: Light bomber/General purpose
- Manufacturer: Airco
- Primary users: Royal Air Force Soviet Air Forces; Royal Australian Air Force; Iranian Air Forces
- Number built: 1,997 + 2,400+ as R.1

History
- Introduction date: 1918
- First flight: March 1918
- Retired: 1931
- Developed from: Airco DH.9
- Variants: Westland Walrus de Havilland DH.15

The Airco DH.9A is a British single-engined light bomber that was designed and first used shortly before the end of the First World War. It was a development of the unsuccessful Airco DH.9 bomber, featuring a strengthened structure and, crucially, replacing the under-powered and unreliable inline 6-cylinder Siddeley Puma engine of the DH.9 with the American V-12 Liberty L-12 engine.

Colloquially known as the "Ninak" (from the phonetic alphabet treatment of designation "nine-A"), it served on in large numbers for the Royal Air Force following the end of the war, both at home and overseas, where it was used for colonial policing in the Middle East, finally being retired in 1931. Over 2,400 examples of an unlicensed version, the Polikarpov R-1, were built in the Soviet Union, the type serving as the standard Soviet light bomber and reconnaissance aircraft through the 1920s. An American version, the USD-9A, was ordered from Curtiss though only nine were built. One served as a test-bed for experimental high-altitude flight.

== Design and development ==
The DH.9A was planned as an improved version of the existing Airco DH.9. The DH.9 was a disappointment owing to its under-performing and unreliable engines, and the DH.9A was to use a more powerful engine to resolve this. As the Rolls-Royce Eagle engine used in the successful DH.4 was unavailable in sufficient quantities, the new American 400 hp (300 kW) Liberty engine was chosen instead.

As Airco was busy developing the Airco DH.10 Amiens twin-engined bomber, detailed design was carried out by Westland Aircraft. The DH.9 was fitted with new, longer-span wings and a strengthened fuselage structure.

The first prototype flew in March 1918, powered by a Rolls-Royce Eagle as no Liberty engines were yet available. The prototype proved successful, with the first Liberty-engined DH.9A flying on 19 April 1918, and deliveries to the Royal Air Force starting in June. By the end of the war, a total of 2,250 DH.9As had been ordered, with 885 being built by the end of the year. As it was decided that the DH.9A would be a standard type in the postwar RAF, the majority of outstanding orders were fulfilled, with 1,730 being built under the wartime contracts before production ceased in 1919.

While the existing aircraft were subject to a programme of refurbishment, a number of small contracts were placed for new production of DH.9As in 1925–26. These contracts resulted in a further 268 DH.9As being built. The new production and refurbished aircraft included batches of dual control trainers, as well as six aircraft powered by 465 hp (347 kW) Napier Lion engines, which were capable of a maximum speed of 144 mph (232 km/h).

=== Soviet versions ===
The Soviet Union acquired a number of DH.9A’s during the Allied intervention in the Russian Civil War; they built large numbers of an unlicensed copy of the aircraft, supervised by N. N. Polikarpov and designated the Polikarpov R-1. After the production of 20 DH.4 copies, followed by about 200 copies of the DH.9 powered by the Mercedes D.IV engine (also designated R-1) and a further 130 powered by the Siddeley Puma (designated R-2), a copy of the DH.9A powered by the M-5 engine, a Soviet copy of the DH.9A's Liberty, entered production in 1924. Over 2,400 built from 1922 to 1932. The R-4 was a modification of the R-1, with the engine lowered and moved forward by 140 mm (5.5 in) to improve both the forward visibility and the C.G position. The nose shape was improved by fairing and by installing a retractable ventral radiator. Overall length was increased by 389 mm (15.3 in). Landing legs were changed from wood to steel. Testing showed insufficient improvement over the R-1 to justify production but late R-1s incorporated some of the modifications.

=== US version and pressurised flights ===
The United States also planned to adopt the DH.9A as a replacement for the DH.4. Development work on the Americanization of the aircraft commenced at McCook Field in Dayton, Ohio. Modifications included a new fuel system with increased fuel capacity, revised wings and tail surfaces, and replacement of the Vickers machine gun on the port side of the British built aircraft with a Browning machine gun on the starboard side. Plans called for Curtiss to build 4,000 modified aircraft, designated USD-9A. This order was cancelled with the end of the war and only nine were built by McCook Field and Dayton-Wright. One McCook aircraft was additionally modified with an enclosed, pressurised cockpit. In 1921, test pilot Lt. Harold R. Harris made the world's first high-altitude flight in a pressurised aircraft in the USD-9A at McCook Field in Dayton, Ohio.

== Operational history ==
=== First World War ===
The DH.9A entered service in July 1918 with No. 110 Squadron RAF, moving to France on 31 August 1918 to serve with the RAF's Independent Air Force on strategic bombing missions. Its first mission was against a German airfield on 14 September 1918. A further three squadrons commenced operations over the Western Front before the Armistice, with 99 Squadron (also serving with the Independent Air Force) replacing DH.9s, while 18 Squadron and 216 Squadron replaced DH.4s. Despite the superior performance of the DH.9A over the DH.9, the DH.9A squadrons suffered high losses during their long range bombing missions over Germany. Other squadrons flew coastal patrols from Great Yarmouth before the end of the year.

The United States Marine Corps Northern Bombing Group received at least 53 DH-9As, and commenced operations in September 1918.

=== Interwar RAF service ===
While the squadrons in service at the end of the First World War quickly disbanded or re-equipped in the postwar dis-armament, the DH.9A continued in service as the RAF's standard light bomber, with 24 squadrons being equipped between 1920 and 1931, both at home and abroad.

The first post war operations were in southern Russia during 1919, in support of the "White Army" against the Bolsheviks during the Russian Civil War. In September 1919, the RAF personnel were ordered to return home, leaving their aircraft behind. A squadron of DH.9As was deployed to Turkey in response to the Chanak Crisis in 1922, but did not engage in combat.

The DH.9A was one of the key weapons used by Britain to manage the territories that were in its control following the collapse of the Ottoman Empire following the Great War. Five squadrons of DH.9As served in the Middle East, occasionally carrying out bombing raids against rebellious tribesmen and villages. An additional radiator was fitted under the fuselage to cope with the high temperatures, while additional water containers and spares (including spare wheels lashed to the fuselage) were carried in case the aircraft were forced down in the desert, the DH.9A's struggling under ever heavier loads. Despite this the aircraft served successfully, with the Liberty engine being picked out for particular praise for its reliability ("as good as any Rolls Royce") in such harsh conditions. Some DH.9A aircraft were also transported to India to supplement the British Indian Army.

At home, the DH.9A continued on in regular RAF service until 1930, also forming the initial equipment of the Royal Auxiliary Air Force (RAuxAF).

=== Soviet service ===
The R-1 and R-2 were heavily used by the Soviet Air Forces through the 1920s as its standard light bomber and reconnaissance aircraft. The Soviets deployed them in support of the Chinese Kuomintang forces in the Northern Expedition against warlords in 1926–27, and against Chinese forces for control of the Chinese Eastern Railway in Manchuria in 1929. R-1s and R-2s were also used in support of operations during the Basmachi Revolt in central Asia.

== Variants ==
- Airco DH.9A: Original version.
- de Havilland DH.9AJ: Single prototype with Bristol Jupiter engine.
- de Havilland DH.9R: Racing aircraft with sesquiplane wings and powered with a Napier Lion engine – (one built).
- Airco DH.15 Gazelle: DH.9A fitted with a Galloway Atlantic inline engine, one conversion
- Airco DH.16: Civil transport with widened fuselage seating four passengers in a glazed cabin behind the pilot, who sat in an open cabin, nine built. Rolls Royce Eagle or Napier Lion Engine.
- de Havilland DH-49 – proposed modernised version with Eagle IX engine (not built)
- Engineering Division USD-9A: United States built version, 9 built. One modified with a pressurised cockpit.
- Engineering Division USD-9B: USD-9A fitted with more powerful Liberty engine and greater area wings.
- Armstrong Whitworth Tadpole One prototype conversion for a naval three-seat spotter/reconnaissance aircraft.
- Westland Walrus Production version of the Tadpole conversion with the Napier Lion III engine (36 built).

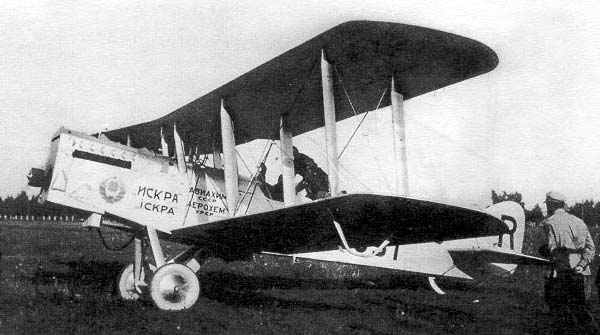
Polikarpov R-1

- Polikarpov R-1 and R-2 Copy of DH.9A built in the Soviet Union, supervised by N. N. Polikarpov. Early aircraft were powered by Mercedes D.IV or Armstrong Siddeley Puma engines, but most were powered by the M-5 copy of the Liberty Engine. Over 2,400 built from 1922 to 1932.
- Polikarpov R-1 BMW: R-1 fitted a 240 hp (180 kW) BMW IVa engine, 20 built.
- Polikarpov MR-1: Twin-float seaplane version, 124 built.
- Polikarpov PM-2: Prototype floatplane fitted with metal floats.
- Polikarpov R-4: R-1 with better forward view and CG position, forward profile cleaned up with fairings and a retractable ventral radiator. Stronger landing gear. No production but changes incorporated into late R-1s.

== Operators ==
Afghanistan

- Afghan Air Force – Airco DH.9As and Polikarpov R-1s

Australia

- Royal Australian Air Force: 30 received as an imperial gift in 1920 plus one attrition replacement purchased in 1921. It was the first aircraft from the imperial gift to enter Australian service. The aircraft were in service from 1920 to 1930, and were replaced by the Westland Wapiti.
  - No. 1 Flying Training School RAAF (22 aircraft: A1-1/2/5/7-11/13-21/23/24/26/29/30)
  - No. 1 Squadron RAAF (12 aircraft: A1-4/5/7/9/12/14/20-22/25/26/28)
  - No. 3 Squadron RAAF (8 aircraft: A1-3/6/8/10/24/25/27/28)
  - Central Flying School RAAF (4 aircraft: A1-16/17/26, E8616)

Canada

- Canadian Air Force (1918–1920)
  - No. 2 Squadron CAF
- Canadian Air Force (1920–1924)
- Royal Canadian Air Force

Iran

- Imperial Iranian Air Force

Iran had 5. First 2 were R-1 numbered as 2501 and 2503, Next 3 were DH.9A

Latvia

- Latvian Air Force

Mongolia

- Mongolian People's Air Force : Polikarpov R-1s and R-2s

Portugal

- Portuguese Air Force

Switzerland

- Swiss Air Force : One aircraft only.

United Kingdom

- Royal Air Force
  - No. 3 Squadron RAF
  - No. 8 Squadron RAF
  - No. 11 Squadron RAF
  - No. 14 Squadron RAF
  - No. 15 Squadron RAF
  - No. 18 Squadron RAF
  - No. 22 Squadron RAF
  - No. 24 Squadron RAF
  - No. 25 Squadron RAF
  - No. 30 Squadron RAF
  - No. 39 Squadron RAF
  - No. 45 Squadron RAF
  - No. 47 Squadron RAF
  - No. 55 Squadron RAF
  - No. 60 Squadron RAF
  - No. 84 Squadron RAF
  - No. 99 Squadron RAF
  - No. 100 Squadron RAF
  - No. 110 Squadron RAF
  - No. 205 Squadron RAF
  - No. 207 Squadron RAF
  - No. 207 Squadron RAF
  - No. 221 Squadron RAF
  - No. 273 Squadron RAF
  - No. 501 Squadron RAF
  - No. 600 Squadron RAF
  - No. 601 Squadron RAF
  - No. 602 Squadron RAF
  - No. 603 Squadron RAF
  - No. 604 Squadron RAF
  - No. 605 Squadron RAF

United States

- United States Navy
- United States Marine Corps

Soviet Union

- Soviet Air Force : Polikarpov R-1s and R-2s

== Surviving aircraft ==
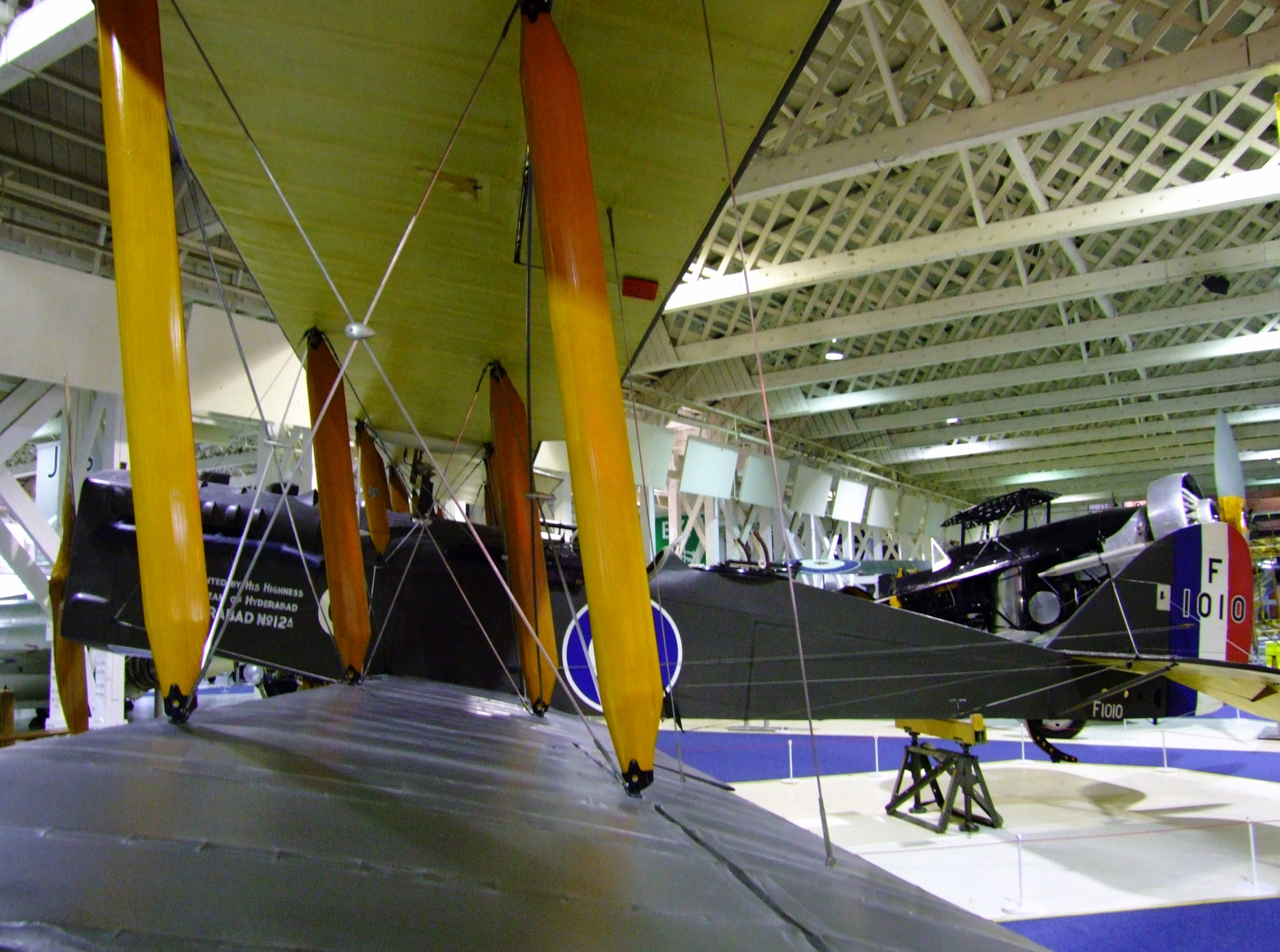
DH.9A number F1010 at the RAF Museum, London in 2010

A single example, serial number F1010, survives and is on display at the Royal Air Force Museum London. The aircraft was completed by Westland Aircraft in June 1918 and was one of 18 DH.9A's assigned to No. 110 Squadron RAF. It was the thirteenth aircraft, but was given the number "12A" because thirteen was thought unlucky. The squadron began flying bombing missions in September 1918, and on the 25th, the crew of F1010 claimed the destruction of a German Fokker D.VII fighter. The aircraft's fourth and final combat mission was on 5 October when either flak damage or engine trouble forced a landing behind German lines. The aircraft was undamaged by the landing and the crew were taken prisoner.

The aircraft remained in German hands after the war and in 1936 it was put on display at the Deutsche Luftfahrt Sammlung (Berlin Air Museum), one of the museum's substantial collection of World War 1 aircraft. In 1943, it was one of the museum's exhibits that was moved to Czarnikau (now Czarnkow in Poland) to save them from the Allied bombing of Berlin. The area was captured by Polish forces in March 1945 and F1010 eventually became part of the collection of the Polish Aviation Museum, although it was not put on display and remained in the museum's stores. In 1977, the Polish Aviation Museum exchanged F1010 for a Supermarine Spitfire from the RAF Museum (difficulties caused by the Cold War meant nearly nine years were spent negotiating the swap). The RAF Museum completed restoration of the aircraft and put it on display in 1983.

== Specifications (DH.9A) ==
DH.9A

Data from The British Bomber since 1914

General characteristics

- Crew: 2
- Length: 30 ft 3 in (9.22 m)
- Wingspan: 45 ft 11 3/8 in (14.005 m)
- Height: 11 ft 4 in (3.45 m)
- Wing area: 486.75 sq ft (45.221 m^{2})
- Empty weight: 2,800 lb (1,270 kg)
- Max takeoff weight: 4,645 lb (2,107 kg)
- Powerplant: 1 × Liberty 12A water-cooled V-12 engine, 400 hp (300 kW)

Performance

- Maximum speed: 123 mph (198 km/h, 107 kn) at sea level, 114.5 mph (184.3 km/h; 99.5 kn) at 10,000 ft (3,000 m)
- Endurance: 5 h 25 min
- Service ceiling: 16,750 ft (5,110 m)
- Time to altitude: 15 min 45 s to 10,000 ft (3,000 m)

Armament

- Guns:
  - 1 × forward firing .303 in (7.7 mm) Vickers machine gun,
  - 1 or 2 × .303 in (7.7 mm) Lewis guns on Scarff ring
- Bombs: Up to 740 lb (340 kg) on under-wing and fuselage racks

== See also ==
Related development

- Airco DH.9
- Westland Wapiti
- Westland Wallace

Related lists

- List of aircraft of the RAF
- List of bomber aircraft

== Bibliography ==
- Aircraft of the Royal Australian Air Force. Simon and Schuster, 2021. ISBN 9781922488046
- Alexandrov, Andrei and Gennady Petrov. "Aah! De Havilland-Ski!: Origins and Development of the R-1, the Soviet DH.9A". Air Enthusiast, No. 74, March/April 1998. pp. 54–63. ISSN 0143-5450.
- Bowyer, Chaz. "de Havilland D.H.9A (RAF: 1918–30)". Aircraft in Profile, Volume 14. Windsor, Berkshire, UK: Profile Publications Ltd., 1974, pp. 25–49. ISBN 978-0-85383-023-8.
- Bruce, J.M. "The De Havilland D.H.9A: Historic Military Aircraft No.13, Part I". Flight, 25 May 1956, pp. 641–644.
- Bruce, J.M. "The De Havilland D.H.9A: Historic Military Aircraft No.13, Part II". Flight, 1 June 1956, pp. 677–680.
- Cornelisse, Diana G. Splendid Vision, Unswerving Purpose: Developing Air Power for the United States Air Force During the First Century of Powered Flight. Wright-Patterson Air Force Base, Ohio: US Air Force Publications, 2002. ISBN 0-16-067599-5.
- Donald, David, ed. The Encyclopedia of World Aircraft. London: Aerospace Publishing, 1997. ISBN 1-85605-375-X.
- Gunston, Bill. The Osprey Encyclopedia of Russian Aircraft from 1875–1995. London: Osprey Aerospace, 1995. ISBN 1-85532-405-9.
- Jackson, A.J. De Havilland Aircraft since 1909. London: Putnam, Third edition, 1987. ISBN 0-85177-802-X.
- Kostenuk, Samuel; Griffin, John (1977). RCAF: Squadron Histories and Aircraft, 1924–1968. Canadian War Museum Historical Publication No. 14. Sarasota/Toronto: Samuel Stevens/Hakkert & Company. ISBN 0-88866-577-6.
- Mason, Francis K. The British Bomber since 1914. London: Putnam Aeronautical Books, 1994. ISBN 0-85177-861-5.
- Niccoli, Riccardo. "Atlantic Sentinels: The Portuguese Air Force Since 1912". Air Enthusiast, No. 73, January/February 1998. pp 20–35. ISSN 0143-5450
- Sims, Charles. "Talkback". Air Enthusiast. No. 13, August–November 1980. p. 79. ISSN 0143-5450
- Thetford, Owen. "By Day and By Night: Part 3". Aeroplane Monthly, Vol. 20, No. 8, Issue No. 232, August 1992, pp. 16–22. London: IPC. ISSN 0143-7240.
- Williams, George K. Biplanes and Bombsights: British Bombing in World War I. Maxwell Air Force Base, Alabama: Air University Press, 1999. ISBN 1-41020-012-4.
