= Beardmore 120 hp =

120 hp
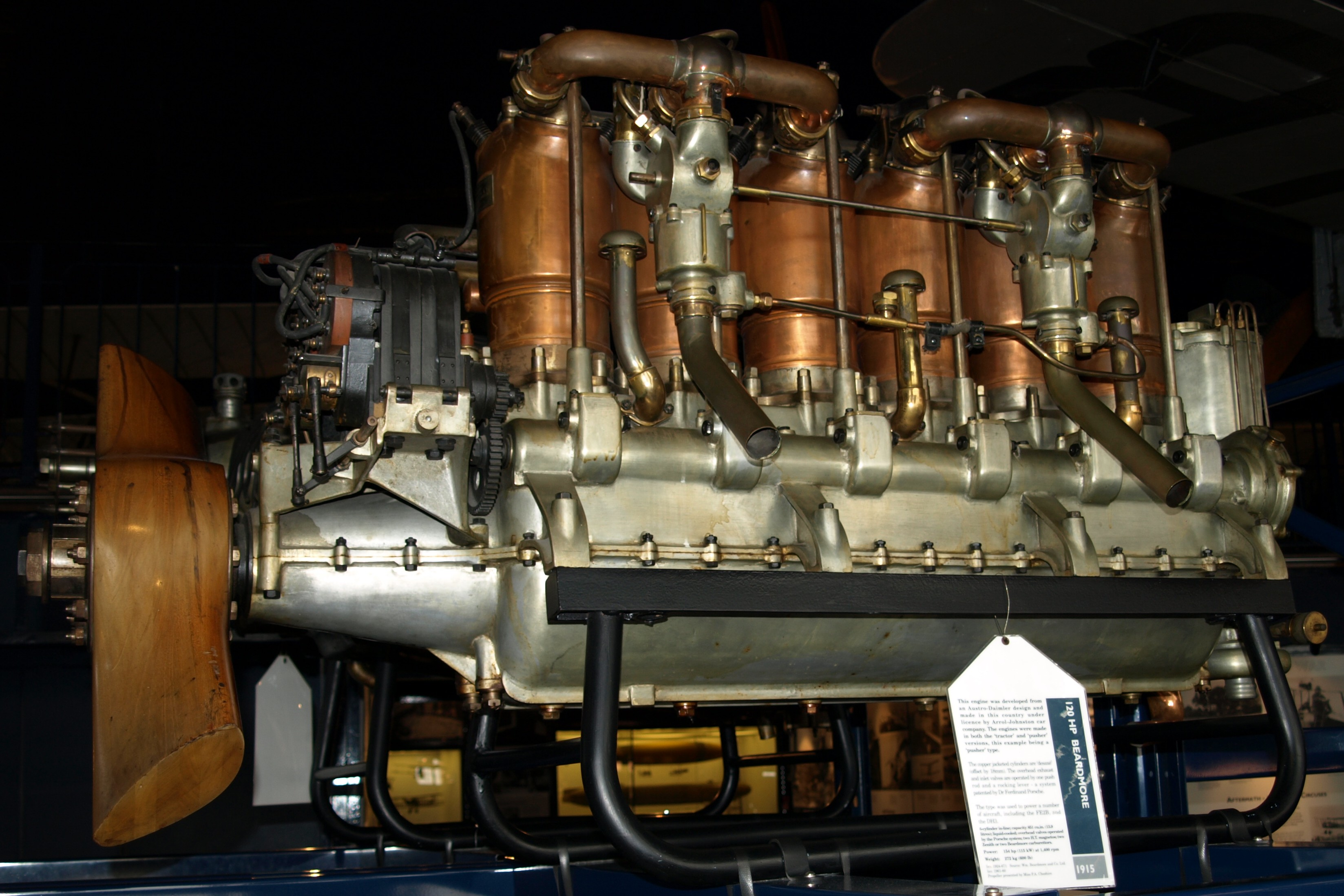
- Preserved Beardmore 120 hp.
- Type: Piston aero engine
- Manufacturer: William Beardmore and Company
- First run: c.1914
- Major applications: Airco DH.1
- Number built: 400
- Developed from: Austro-Daimler 6
- Developed into: Beardmore 160 hp

The Beardmore 120 hp was a British six-cylinder, water-cooled aero engine that first ran in 1914, it was built by William Beardmore and Company as a licensed-built version of the Austro-Daimler 6. The engine featured cast iron cylinders and mild steel concave pistons. Produced between August 1914 and December 1918, the design powered many World War I aircraft types.

== Applications ==
- Airco DH.1
- Airco DH.3
- Armstrong Whitworth F.K.3
- Armstrong Whitworth F.K.8
- Bristol T.T.A.
- Cody V
- Martinsyde Elephant
- Royal Aircraft Factory F.E.2
- Royal Aircraft Factory R.E.5
- Royal Aircraft Factory R.E.7
- Vickers F.B.14
- White and Thompson No. 3

== Specifications (120 hp) ==
Data from Lumsden

=== General characteristics ===
- Type: 6-cylinder, inline, upright piston engine
- Bore: 5.12 in (130 mm)
- Stroke: 6.89 in (175 mm)
- Displacement: 851 cu in (13.145 L)
- Length: 57 in (1,148 mm)
- Width: 19.9 in (505 mm)
- Height: 31.9 in (810 mm)
- Dry weight: 545 lb (247 kg)

=== Components ===
- Valvetrain: Overhead valve
- Fuel type: Petrol
- Cooling system: Water-cooled
- Reduction gear: Direct drive, right-hand tractor

=== Performance ===
- Power output: 154 hp (115 kW) at 1,400 rpm (maximum power)
- Specific power: 0.18 hp/cu in (8.74 kw/L)
- Compression ratio: 4.85:1
- Power-to-weight ratio: 0.28 hp/lb (0.46 kW/kg)

== See also ==
Related development

- Austro-Daimler 6
- Beardmore 160 hp

Comparable engines

- Benz Bz.IV
- Hiero 6
- Mercedes D.II
- Rolls-Royce Hawk

Related lists

- List of aircraft engines
