= Beardmore 160 hp =

160 hp
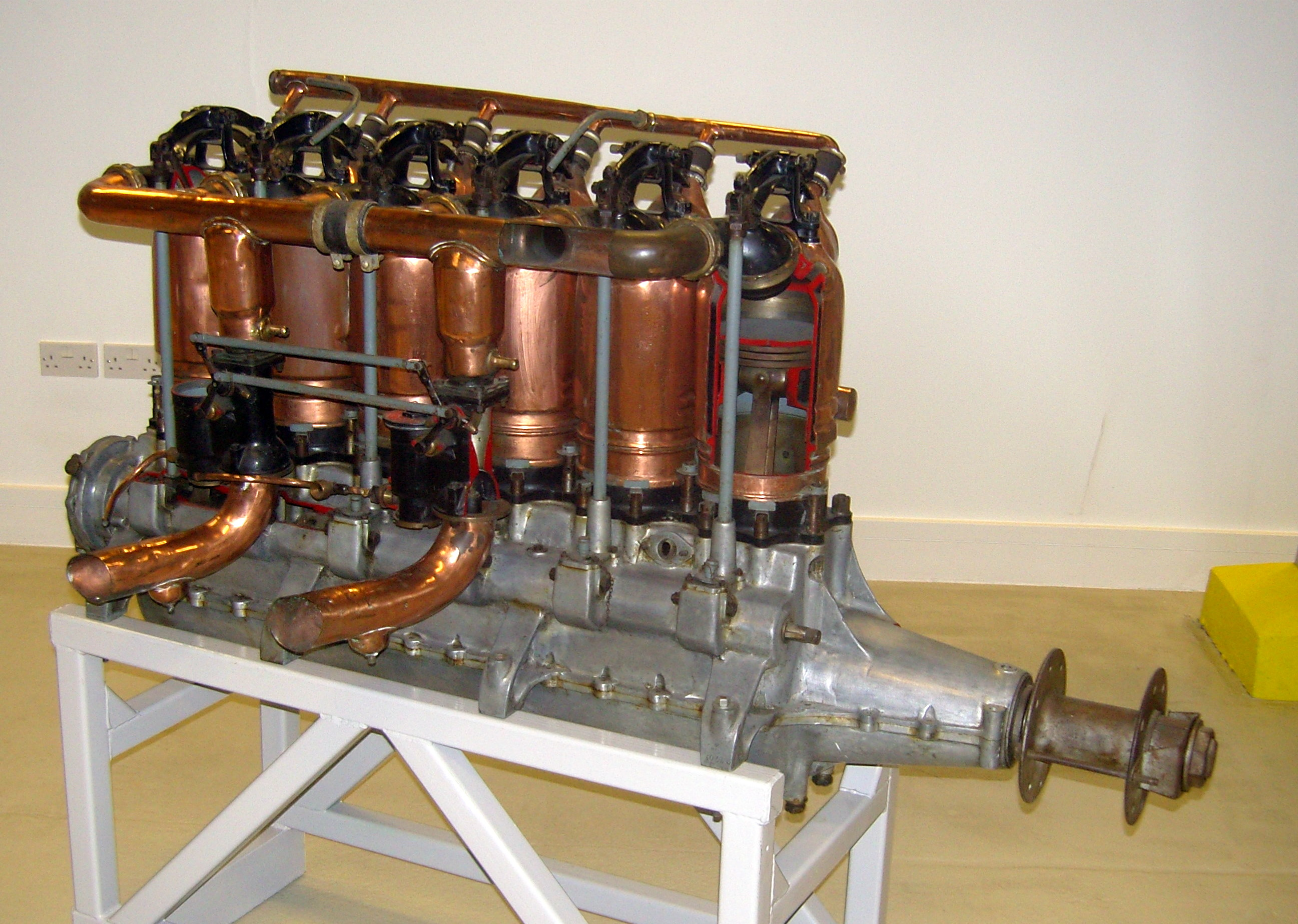
- Beardmore 160 hp at the Imperial War Museum Duxford
- Type: Piston aero engine
- Manufacturer: William Beardmore and Company
- First run: c.1916
- Major applications: Royal Aircraft Factory R.E.7
- Number built: 2,556
- Developed from: Beardmore 120 hp
- Developed into: Galloway Adriatic

The Beardmore 160 hp is a British six-cylinder, water-cooled aero engine that first ran in 1916. It was built by Arrol-Johnston and Crossley Motors for William Beardmore and Company as a development of the Beardmore 120 hp, itself a license-built version of the Austro-Daimler 6.

== Development ==
The engine featured cast iron cylinders and mild steel concave pistons. Produced between March 1916 and December 1918, the design powered many World War I aircraft types. It was noted that the engine was not as reliable as its smaller capacity predecessor.

== Applications ==
- Airco DH.3
- Armstrong Whitworth F.K.7
- Austin Kestrel
- Beardmore W.B.II
- Beardmore W.B.X
- Central Centaur IIA
- Marinens Flyvebaatfabrikk M.F.6
- Martinsyde G.102
- Norman Thompson N.T.2B
- Royal Aircraft Factory F.E.2
- Royal Aircraft Factory R.E.7
- Short Sporting Type
- Sikorsky Ilya Muromets (No. 182)
- Supermarine Channel
- Supermarine Sea King
- Vickers F.B.14

== Survivors ==
A Beardmore 160 hp has been restored to airworthy condition by The Vintage Aviator Ltd, an aircraft restoration company based in Wellington, New Zealand. The engine was found complete and in a preserved condition in a farm shed in Uruguay, after a complete overhaul and ground test runs the engine powered the company's F.E.2b replica on its maiden flight.

== Engines on display ==
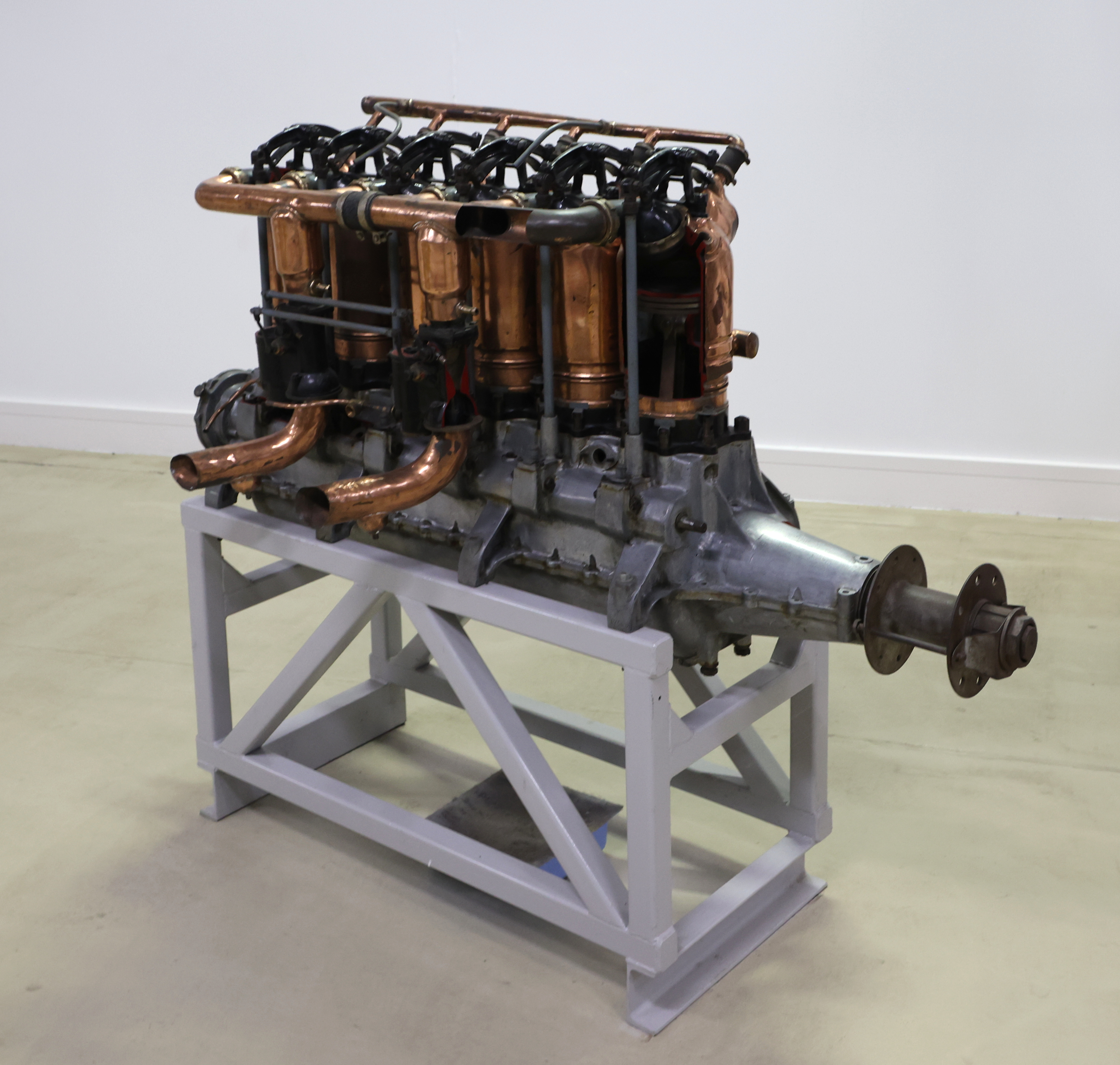
Beardmore at duxford

- A partially sectioned Beardmore 160 hp is on display at the Imperial War Museum Duxford.
- The Beardmore 160 hp engine installed in the recently restored F.E.2 can be viewed at the Royal Air Force Museum London.

== Specifications (160 hp) ==
Data from Lumsdenand Jane's

=== General characteristics ===
- Type: 6-cylinder, inline, upright piston engine
- Bore: 5.59 in (142 mm)
- Stroke: 6.93 in (176 mm)
- Displacement: 1,020 cu in (16.635 L)
- Length: 57 in (1,148 mm)
- Width: 19.9 in (505 mm)
- Height: 31.9 in (810 mm)
- Dry weight: 615 lb (279 kg)

=== Components ===
- Valvetrain: Overhead valve
- Fuel system: Twin Zenith carburettors
- Fuel type: Petrol
- Oil system: Gear pump
- Cooling system: Water-cooled
- Reduction gear: Direct drive, right-hand tractor

=== Performance ===
- Power output: 186 hp (139 kW) at 1,450 rpm (maximum power)
- Specific power: 0.18 hp/cu in (8.74 kw/L)
- Compression ratio: 4.56:1
- Specific fuel consumption: 0.57 pints per hp/hr
- Oil consumption: 0.3 pints per hp/hr
- Power-to-weight ratio: 0.30 hp/lb (0.5 kW/kg)

== See also ==
Related development

- Austro-Daimler 6
- Beardmore 120 hp

Comparable engines

- Benz Bz.IV
- Hiero 6
- Mercedes D.III

Related lists

- List of aircraft engines
