= Airco DH.10 Amiens =

Twin-engined heavy bomber

DH.10 Amiens
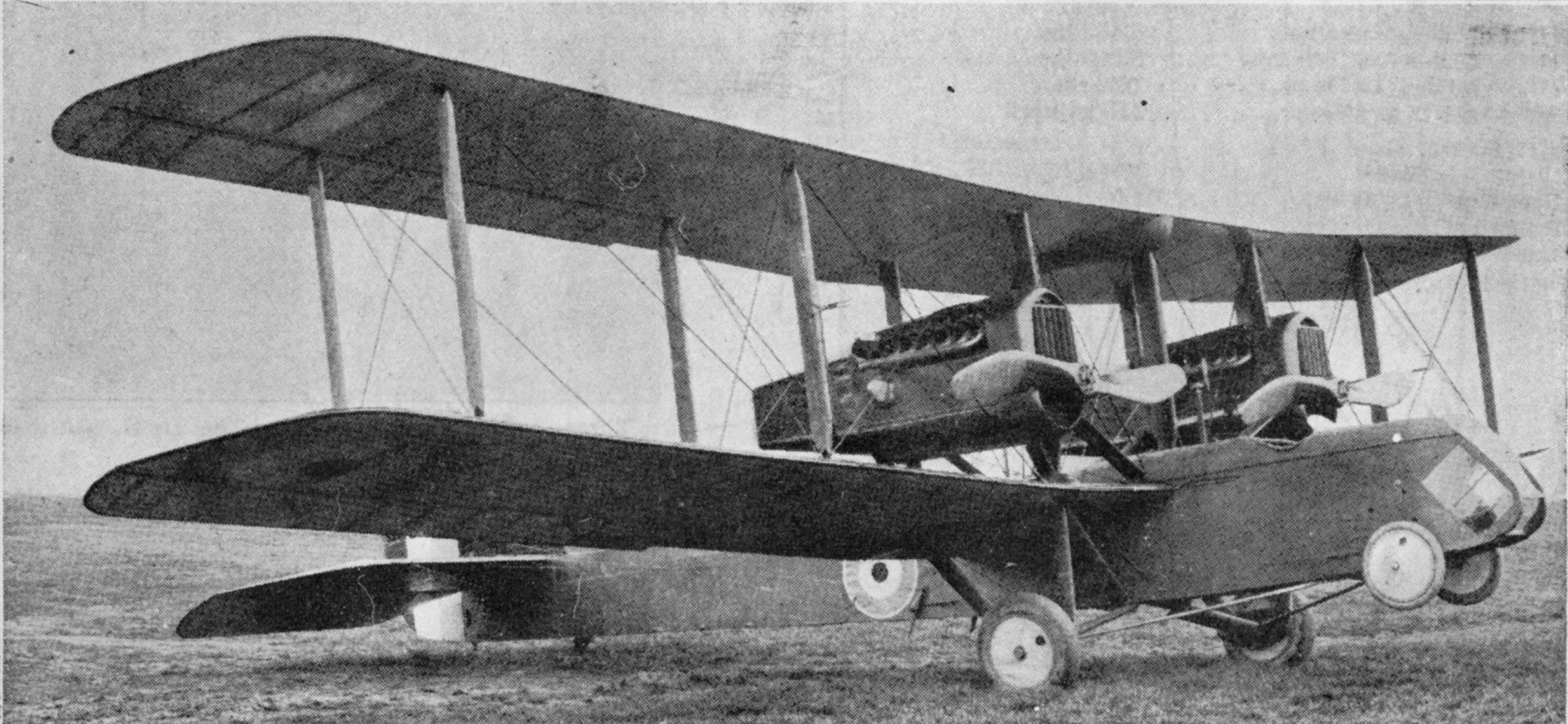

General information
- Type: Heavy bomber
- Manufacturer: Airco
- Designer: Geoffrey de Havilland
- Primary user: Royal Air Force
- Number built: 258

History
- Introduction date: November 1918
- First flight: 4 March 1918
- Retired: 1923
- Developed into: de Havilland DH.11 Oxford

The Airco DH.10 Amiens was a twin-engined heavy bomber designed and produced by the British aircraft manufacturer Airco. It performed the first nighttime air mail service in the world on 14-15 May 1919.

The DH.10 was developed in the final years of the First World War in response to a requirement to equip the newly-formed Royal Air Force (RAF) with an expanded offensive bombing capability. It was based upon the earlier Airco DH.3 bomber, which had not been pursued largely due to disinterest in heavy bombers at that time. The first prototype performed its maiden flight on 4 March 1918; dissatisfaction with its performance led to the aircraft being redesigned with more powerful engines and a tractor configuration, which was received more favourably. Over 1,200 DH.10s were on order at one stage.

Only a handful of DH.10s had been delivered to the RAF, and a single offensive mission conducted, before the Armistice of 11 November 1918 came into effect, ending the conflict. The diminishing need for bombers meant orders for the type were reduced and production was scaled back substantially. Nevertheless, over 250 DH.10s were constructed and were operated during the interwar period, seeing use in the Third Anglo-Afghan war as well as for air mail services in various regions. The type was replaced by more capable bombers during the early 1920s.

== Design and development ==
=== Background ===
The origins of the DH.10 can be largely traced back to April 1917 and the Air Board's issuing of Specification A.2.b, which sought a new day bomber, powered either by single or twin-engines. Stipulations of the requirement included up to 500 lb of bombs, at least two guns with 150 lb of ammunition, and the ability to fly at least 110 mph at an altitude of 15,000 feet when fully loaded. A good means of communication between the crew was also mentioned, as well as for the aircraft to be capable of staying afloat for at least three hours in the event of a water landing. In late 1917, Airco decided to respond to A.2.b, with the work headed by the aeronautical engineer Geoffrey de Havilland. The proposal was heavily derived from the company's earlier 320 hp (240 kW) DH.3A bomber, which had flown in 1916 but had been rejected by the War Office largely due to a lack of engine power resulting in a dismal climb rate - taking 58 minutes to reach 6,500 feet, which made strategic bombing with it impractical, while the other submission for the role, the Royal Aircraft Factory F.E.4 had fared even worse.

In comparison to the DH.3, the proposed aircraft, which was designated DH.10, shared a broadly similar configuration but was slightly larger. While also equipped with twin engines, more powerful Siddeley Puma engines, each capable of generating up to 230 hp (170 kW), were adopted for the aircraft in a pusher arrangement. It was also designed as a three-seater, an arrangement that met with official acceptance despite the specification having called for a crew of two. Having been sufficiently impressed with the proposal, the company was issued with Contract No. AS.31576 for a total of four prototypes to be constructed.

=== Into flight ===
The first prototype, C8858, conducted its maiden flight on 4 March 1918. Originally, the first flight had been intended to occur in January 1918, but its completion had been delayed due to labour issues and the late delivery of components. During its service evaluation at Martlesham Heath one month later, the performance of this prototype was determined to be beneath expectations, attaining only 90 mph (140 km/h) at 15,000 ft (4,600 m) with the required bomb load, compared with the specified 110 mph (180 km/h). Owing to this poor performance, the DH.10 was redesigned with more powerful engines in a tractor installation.

The second prototype, C8959, known as the Amiens Mark.II, was powered by two 360 hp (270 kW) Rolls-Royce Eagle VIII engines. It made its first flight on 20 April 1918 and was test flown by Airco for roughly two months. It demonstrated superior performance, proving to be faster than the single engine Airco DH.9A while carrying twice the bomb load, that the company decided to adopt the tractor configuration for all future aircraft. While shortages of the Eagle meant that the Amiens Mark.II could not be put into production, it proved the design of the definitive aircraft. The third design, Amiens Mark III, prototypes C8860 and C4283, which was powered by the more readily available 395 hp (295 kW) Liberty 12 from America, as was the DH.9A.

During June 1918, evaluation flights of the third prototype commenced; it was damaged in a crash at Martlesham Heath that summer, but was repaired. The fourth prototype was almost one-for-one identical with the subsequent production aircraft; it started official evaluations during August 1918. According to aviation author J.M. Bruce, confidence in the DH.10 was relatively high amongst officials. Following its successful evaluation, several large orders were placed, totalling 1,291 aircraft on order at one point.

=== Production ===
By 22 March 1918, production contracts had been placed with five separate manufacturers, covering a total of 800 aircraft, even prior to the completion of the first prototype's evaluation. Further contracts followed in June and July of that year for 475 aircraft from Airco, Alliance and Mann Egerton. Production of the Liberty engine, which was lower than anticipated, served to restrain the DH.10's rate of production, leading to a revival in interest in the Rolls-Royce Eagle engine.

The vehicle manufacturer Daimler were producing 80 DH.10s per month by the end of 1918. They were part of the Birmingham Small Arms (BSA) group which purchased Airco after the conflict, and launched a charter and scheduled service known as Daimler Air Hire and Daimler Airway. Apart from the Aircraft Manufacturing Company's order for 420 aircraft, the following companies had subcontracts to build the DH.10, although due to the end of the war not all were built:

- The Birmingham Carriage Company – 100
- Daimler Limited – 150
- National Aircraft Factory No.2 (Heaton Chapel) – 200
- The Siddeley-Deasy Car Company – 150
- The Alliance Aero Company – 200
- Mann, Egerton & Company – 75

By June 1920, surplus DH.10s were being advertised for sale to interested parties, both domestic and international ones.

== Operational history ==
At an early stage of the DH.10's development, it had been anticipated that the aircraft was to equip eight squadrons of the Independent Air Force (IAF) by 1919. By 31 October 1918, less than two weeks from the end of the conflict, only eight aircraft had been delivered to the RAF, including to the IAF.

No. 104 Squadron (41st Wing, VIII Brigade) flew a single bombing mission, on 10 November 1918, prior to the Armistice that ended the First World War came into effect. In September 1918, the IAF filed a request for greater endurance, leading to a 40-gallon auxiliary tank being rapidly designed and deployed one month later. Early operations of the DH.10 were often troubled by the somewhat unusual fuel system, which was attributed as being involved in multiple crashes on takeoff; Bruce notes that fuel starvation occurred as late as May 1920.

Following the conflict, use of the type was somewhat curtailed. A number of DH.10s equipped No. 120 Squadron, which used them to operate an air mail service in support of the British Army of Occupation on the Rhine. One of the squadron's DH.10s became the first aircraft in the world to undertake a nighttime air service, flying between Hawkinge and Cologne on 14-15 June 1919.

The DH.10 was also used by No. 97 Squadron (later renumbered No. 60 Squadron) during its deployment to India, starting in 1919. The type provided support to the Army on the North-West Frontier, and saw active combat in this capacity, performing bombing operations on multiple occasions during the Third Anglo-Afghan war. Specifically, DH.10s conducted reprisal attacks at Datta Khel and Abdur Rahman Khel, amongst other sorties made. Due to the hot climate, its performance was diminished somewhat, thus enlarged radiators were typically fitted.

DH.10s were also operated by No. 216 Squadron in Egypt, where they provided a regular air mail service between Cairo and Baghdad; this started on 23 June 1921, the type was withdrawn from the role during 1923. The final DH.10 in operation was used for experimental purposes, including a series of single-engine test flights, with the Royal Aircraft Establishment (RAE) at Farnborough Airfield.

== Variants ==
Amiens Mk.I
Prototype powered by two pusher Puma engines.
Amiens Mk.II
Prototype powered by two tractor Rolls-Royce Eagle engines.
Amiens Mk.III
Main production variant, powered by Liberty L-12 engines mounted midway between wings, 221 built.
Amiens Mk.IIIA (DH.10A)
Modified Mark III with engines directly attached to lower wings, larger wheels of 1.2 m (3 ft 11 in) diameter. 32 built.
Amiens Mk.IIIC (DH.10C)
Mark IIIA powered by Rolls-Royce Eagle engines. Designed in response to the shortage of Liberty engines. Five built.

A DH.10B designation existed but what it referred to is uncertain; Bruce suggests a Mk III with Eagle engines replacing the Libertys mounted in same place between the upper and lower wings. A DH.10 and a DH.10C were modified to take the 37mm Coventry Ordnance Works (COW) gun; the fuselage was extended forward and nosewheels fitted. The aircraft were sent for testing at the armament experimental unit, Orfordness.

== Operators ==
=== Military operators ===
United Kingdom

- Royal Air Force
  - No. 24 Squadron – used a single DH.10 for communications duties in 1920.
  - No. 27 Squadron – operated two DH.10s for operations over the North-West Frontier in December 1922.
  - No. 51 Squadron – evaluated a single DH.10 as a home defence fighter in 1918.
  - No. 60 Squadron – April 1920 to April 1923.
  - No. 97 Squadron – March 1919 to April 1920.
  - No. 104 Squadron – November 1918 to June 1919.
  - No. 120 Squadron – used a single DH.10 for night air mail trials in May 1919.
  - No. 216 Squadron – August 1920 to June 1922.

=== Civil operators ===
United Kingdom

- Aircraft Transport and Travel Ltd operated the only DH.10 placed on the British Civil Register. This aircraft, G-EAJO, was used for regular airmail flights between Hendon and Renfrew during the railway strike in October 1919. It was destroyed in a crash in April 1920.

United States

- At least one DH.10 was used for US Post Office air mail services on the New York City – Cleveland – Omaha route in 1920.

== Specifications (Amiens IIIA) ==
Data from The British Bomber since 1914

General characteristics

- Crew: Three
- Length: 39 ft 7 7/16 in (12.076 m)
- Wingspan: 65 ft 6 in (19.96 m)
- Height: 14 ft 6 in (4.42 m)
- Wing area: 837.4 sq ft (77.80 m^{2})
- Empty weight: 5,750 lb (2,608 kg)
- Gross weight: 8,500 lb (3,856 kg)
- Max takeoff weight: 9,060 lb (4,110 kg)
- Powerplant: 2 × Liberty 12 water-cooled V-12 engines, 400 hp (300 kW) each
- Propellers: 2-bladed wood fixed pitch propellers

Performance

- Maximum speed: 131 mph (211 km/h, 114 kn) at sea level, 124 mph (200 km/h) at 10,000 feet (3,000 m)
- Endurance: Six hours
- Service ceiling: 19,000 ft (5,800 m)
- Time to altitude: 11 minutes to 10,000 ft (3,000 m)

Armament

- Guns: 1 or 2 × .303 in (7.7 mm) Lewis guns on Scarff rings at both nose and midships gunners cockpits
- Bombs: Up to 920 lb (420 kg) bombs carried internally

== See also ==
Related development

- Airco DH.3
- de Havilland DH.11 Oxford

Aircraft of comparable role, configuration, and era

- Boulton Paul Bourges
- Vickers Vimy

Related lists

- List of bomber aircraft
