= Martinsyde G.100 =

British fighter bomber aircraft

G.100/G.102 "Elephant"
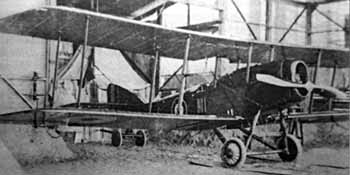

General information
- Type: fighter/day bomber
- Manufacturer: Martinsyde
- Primary users: Royal Flying Corps Australian Flying Corps
- Number built: 271

History
- Introduction date: 1916
- First flight: 1915

The Martinsyde G.100 "Elephant" and the G.102 were British fighter bomber aircraft of the First World War built by Martinsyde. The type gained the name "Elephant" from its relatively large size and lack of manoeuvrability. The G.102 differed from the G.100 only in having a more powerful engine.

== Design and development ==
An unusually large aircraft by contemporary standards for a single-seater, the Elephant two-bay equal span staggered biplane was designed by A A Fletcher of the Martinsyde Company, a prototype powered by a 120 hp Austro-Daimler engine entering test in the autumn of 1915.

The initial production version, the G.100, was powered by a 120h p six-cylinder Beardmore engine and was armed with a single 0.303 in drum-fed Lewis Gun mounted above the centre section. This was later augmented by a similar weapon bracket-mounted to the port fuselage side behind the cockpit).

The G.100 was gradually succeeded by the G.102 with a 160 hp Beardmore engine. Maximum speed of the 160 hp aircraft was 108 mph (174 km/h) at sea level, falling to 100 mph (160 km/h) at 10,000 ft; it had a maximum ceiling of 14,000 ft (4,300 m).

== Operational use ==
The G.100 was built originally as a long-range, single-seat fighter and escort machine but on the basis of its size and weight was reclassified as a day bomber.

Deliveries to the RFC commenced in mid-1916, a total of 270 being manufactured. The G.100 and G.102 Elephants were used in France and the Middle East, although only No. 27 Squadron, RFC was completely equipped with this type.

While not particularly successful as a fighter owing to its poor agility by comparison other fighters of the times, the Elephant performed a useful service in long-range bombing, carrying up to a 260 lb (120 kg) bomb load. It successfully performed this role from the summer of 1916 through to late 1917. It was also used for long-range photo reconnaissance, where stability and endurance were required (the type was capable of a five-and-a-half-hour flight).

== Variants ==
- Martinsyde G.100 : Single-seat fighter-scout, bomber and reconnaissance biplane, powered by a 120 hp (89 kW) Beardmore piston engine. 100 built.
- Martinsyde G.102 : Single-seat fighter-scout, bomber and reconnaissance biplane, powered by a 160 hp (119 kW) Beardmore piston engine. 171 built. The increase in engine size and fuel consumption resulted in a loss of endurance, with the G.102 being only capable of a four-and-a-half-hour flight.

== Operators ==
Australia

- Australian Flying Corps
  - No. 1 Squadron AFC in Egypt and Palestine.

United Kingdom

- Royal Flying Corps
  - No. 14 Squadron RFC
  - No. 18 Squadron RFC
  - No. 20 Squadron RFC
  - No. 21 Squadron RFC
  - No. 23 Squadron RFC
  - No. 25 Squadron RFC
  - No. 27 Squadron RFC
  - No. 30 Squadron RFC
  - No. 31 Squadron RFC
  - No. 39 Squadron RFC
  - No. 51 Squadron RFC
  - No. 63 Squadron RFC
  - No. 72 Squadron RFC
  - No. 110 Squadron RFC
  - No. 142 Squadron RFC

== Specifications (G.100) ==
Data from The British Fighter since 1912

General characteristics

- Crew: 1
- Length: 26 ft 6 in (8.08 m)
- Wingspan: 38 ft 0 in (11.58 m)
- Height: 9 ft 8 in (2.95 m)
- Wing area: 456 sq ft (42.4 m^{2})
- Empty weight: 1,795 lb (814 kg)
- Gross weight: 2,424 lb (1,100 kg)
- Powerplant: 1 × Beardmore 120 hp 6-cylinder water-cooled in-line piston engine, 120 hp (89 kW)
- Propellers: 2-bladed fixed-pitch propeller

Performance

- Maximum speed: 96 mph (154 km/h, 83 kn)
- Range: 450 mi (720 km, 390 nmi)
- Endurance: 4 hours 30 minutes
- Service ceiling: 14,000 ft (4,300 m)
- Time to altitude: 10,000 ft (3,000 m) in 16 minutes with Beardmore 160 hp engine
- Wing loading: 5.2 lb/sq ft (25 kg/m^{2})

Armament

- Guns:

- 1 × 0.303 in Lewis gun mounted above upper wing centre section
- 1 × Lewis gun mounted fixed aft of the cockpit pointing rearwards

- Bombs:

- 260 lb (120 kg) bombload

== See also ==
Related lists

- List of aircraft of the Royal Air Force
