= Airco DH.1 =

British military aircraft

DH.1
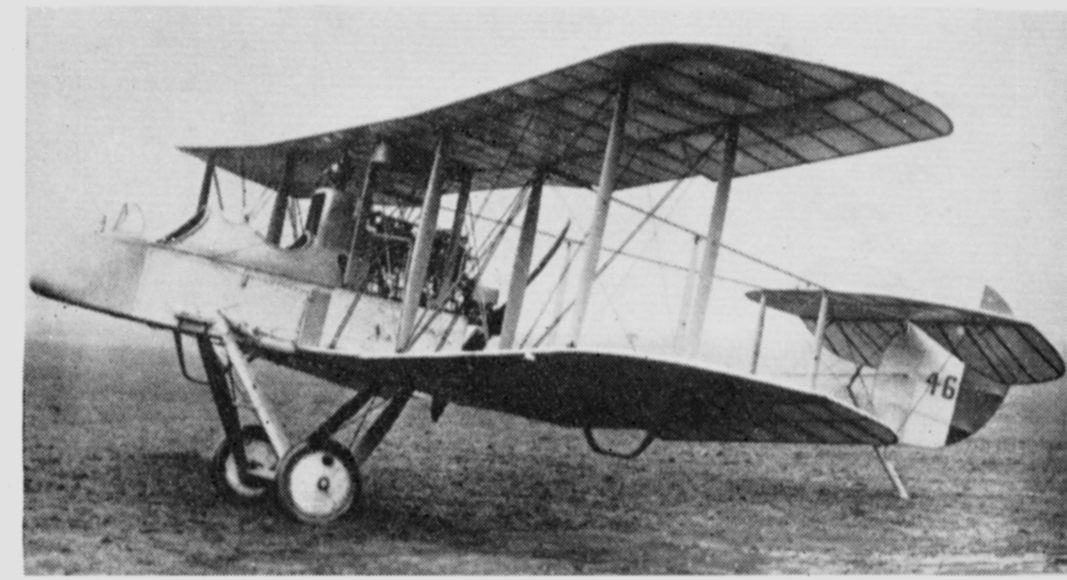
- Prototype DH.1A

General information
- Type: Two-seat fighter / General-purpose aircraft
- National origin: United Kingdom
- Manufacturer: Airco
- Designer: Geoffrey de Havilland
- Primary user: Royal Flying Corps
- Number built: 100

History
- Introduction date: 1915
- First flight: January 1915
- Retired: 1918

The Airco DH.1 was an early military biplane of typical "Farman" pattern flown by Britain's Royal Flying Corps during World War I. By the time the powerplant for which it was designed was sufficiently plentiful it was obsolete as an operational aircraft, and apart from a few examples sent to the Middle East it served as a trainer and Home Defence fighter.

== Design and development ==
Geoffrey de Havilland was one of the pioneering designers at the Royal Aircraft Factory and was partially or wholly responsible for most prewar "Factory" designs. When he left to become chief designer at The Aircraft Manufacturing Company (Airco) in 1914, his first design was strongly reminiscent of the F.E.2, one of the last designs on which he had worked at the Royal Aircraft Factory.

Like the F.E.2, the DH.1 was of pusher configuration, accommodating its pilot and observer in two open tandem cockpits in the nose. The observer's cockpit was stepped down below the pilot's and equipped with a machine gun. The wings were of typical fabric-covered, two-bay, unstaggered, unswept, equal span design, while the stabiliser and rudder were carried on the end of two long, open-framework booms. The type, like the F.E.2b, was designed for the water-cooled Beardmore 120 hp (89 kW) inline engine. (Note: Other sources state that the intended engine was the 100 hp (75 kW) Green.) However, all available Beardmore engines were required for F.E.2b and R.E.5 production, so the air-cooled Renault 70 hp (52 kW) V8 engine was installed instead.

The prototype was fitted with aerofoils attached to the side of the nacelle which could be rotated through 90 degrees to act as air brakes, an unusual feature for the time, although they were soon removed. It had a fixed conventional landing gear with the mainwheels carried on V-struts, using coil springs and oleos for the suspension.

In January 1915 Geoffrey de Havilland piloted the D.H.1 prototype on its first flight at Hendon. Although the Renault engine left it underpowered, performance was still reasonable and the type was ordered into production, with an initial order of 49 being placed. Airco was already occupied with building and designing other aircraft, so DH.1 production was undertaken by Savages Limited of King's Lynn, which had previously manufactured fairground equipment. (Note: It was not uncommon in the First World War for factories that had little background in the aviation industry, but were able to utilize experience in related manufacture, including cabinet making, to undertake aircraft production.) These aircraft used a simpler rubber cord suspension, and had a revised cockpit coaming to give a better field of fire for the observer's gun. Production was initially very slow, and only five examples of the type had reached the RFC by the end of 1915.

Later production machines were fitted with the Beardmore engine, as originally intended, as these had become more plentiful. This version was redesignated the DH.1A. Although testing of the DH.1A showed it to be at least as good as the F.E.2b, this was hardly a recommendation, as the F.E. was itself already slated for replacement with more modern tractor types. Nonetheless, a further order for 50 DH.1As was placed with Savages. (Note: Although all of the second batch were completed, only 73 DH.1s were issued to RFC units.) By the time of the DH.1's first flight, a single-seat "follow-up" was already being considered; and by June 1915 the first D.H.2 had already made its maiden flight. Designed essentially as a smaller version of the D.H.1, the D.H. 2 was to become of one of the most important British fighters of the period.

== Operational history ==
The DH.1 saw operational service only in the Middle East theatre, where six Beardmore-powered DH.1As arrived in July 1916. These were used by No. 14 Squadron RFC as escorts for their B.E.2 reconnaissance aircraft. An Aviatik two-seater was claimed by a 14 Squadron D.H.1A on 2 August 1916 for the only known victory of the type. The last known action by a DH.1 was on 5 March 1917, when one was shot down during a bombing raid on Tel el Sheria. No. 14 Squadron became an R.E.8 unit in November 1917; it seems probable that the last operational DH.1 had gone before that date.

The other DH.1s served in training, with 43 aircraft allotted and Home Defence units in the United Kingdom receiving an additional 24 aircraft, finally being withdrawn from service in 1918.

== Variants ==
DH.1
Prototype and early-production aircraft powered by 70hp Renault engine.
DH.1A
Some 70 production examples powered by a 120hp Beardmore engine

Total production was one prototype and 99 DH.1 and DH.1As, all production examples built by Savages.

== Operators ==
Australia

- Australian Flying Corps
  - No. 1 Squadron AFC operated a single aircraft (no. 4620) from June to July 1916.

United Kingdom

- Royal Flying Corps
  - No. 14 Squadron RFC

== Specifications (DH.1) ==
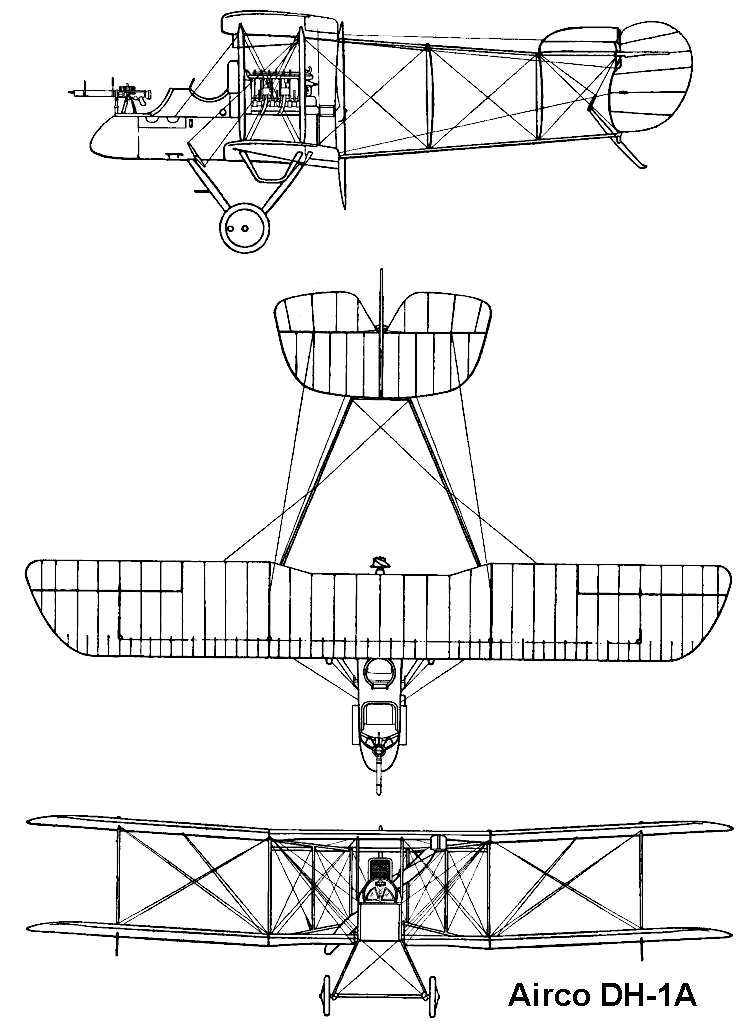
3-view

Data from De Havilland Aircraft since 1909

General characteristics

- Crew: two (pilot and observer)
- Length: 28 ft 11 5/8 in (8.830 m)
- Wingspan: 41 ft 0 in (12.50 m)
- Height: 11 ft 4 in (3.45 m)
- Wing area: 426 1/4 sq ft (39.60 m^{2})
- Empty weight: 1,356 lb (615 kg)
- Gross weight: 2,044 lb (927 kg)
- Powerplant: 1 × Renault Type W air-cooled V-8, 70 hp (52 kW)
- Propellers: wood fixed pitch propeller

Performance

- Maximum speed: 80 mph (130 km/h, 70 kn)
- Rate of climb: 350 ft/min (1.8 m/s)
- Wing loading: 4.7 lb/sq ft (23 kg/m^{2})

Armament

- Guns: 1 × 0.303 in (7.7 mm) Lewis machine gun for observer

== See also ==
Aircraft of comparable role, configuration, and era

- Royal Aircraft Factory F.E.2

Related lists

- List of aircraft of the Royal Air Force
