= Norman Spratt =

Spratt as a test pilot before World War I

Norman Channing Spratt (1885–1944) a native of Durban, Colony of Natal, was an officer of the Royal Flying Corps during the First World War who was involved in aircraft testing at the Royal Aircraft Establishment, Farnborough, United Kingdom. He later served as a group captain in the Royal Air Force. He was appointed as an officer of the Order of the British Empire in 1925.

On 7 December 1913, Spratt, as factory test pilot, crashed Royal Aircraft Factory B.E.2a, 235, at the Farnborough Aerodrome, pilot surviving.

In 1914, Spratt set a new airspeed record in a Royal Aircraft Factory S.E.4, at 134.5 miles per hour (216.5 km/h), bringing the speed title to the U.K. for the first time.

On 14 May 1914, Norman Spratt set a British altitude record of 18,900 feet (5,800 m) while flying one of two Royal Aircraft Factory R.E.5 reconnaissance designs, the fifth and sixth machines, which were produced as single-seat 'height machines', with long strut-braced extensions on the upper wing, which gave it a span of 57 feet 2.39 inches (17.4343 m).

On 12 August 1914, the sole Royal Aircraft Factory S.E.4, 628, crashlanded at 1145 hrs. while being flown by Lt. Spratt when one of the wheels collapsed, airframe overturning, sustaining such extensive damage that it was abandoned.

The first dogfight is believed to have taken place on 28 August 1914, when Spratt, flying a Sopwith Tabloid, forced down a German Albatros C.I two-seater. This was an amazing achievement as his Sopwith was not armed.

The prototype Armstrong Whitworth F.K.3 was first test flown by Spratt in 1915.

Spratt was appointed an Officer of the Order of the British Empire (OBE) in the 1925 Birthday Honours.

Spratt served as a Group Captain during World War II, but died from ill-health in 1944.
