= Austin Kestrel =

Kestrel

General information
- Type: Two-seat biplane
- National origin: United Kingdom
- Manufacturer: Austin Motor Company
- Designer: John Kenworthy
- Number built: 1

History
- First flight: 1920

The Austin Kestrel was a British two-seat biplane designed and built by the Austin Motor Company. Only one aircraft was built.

== Design and development ==
Designed to enter a 1920 Air Ministry competition the Kestrel was a conventional biplane with an open cockpit with side-by-side seats for two. Registered G-EATR the Kestrel came third in the small aeroplane class. The company decided to concentrate on motor car production and the aircraft was sold in 1924 but not flown again.

== Specifications ==
Data from

General characteristics

- Crew: 2
- Length: 25 ft 6 in (7.77 m)
- Wingspan: 38 ft 6 in (11.74 m)
- Wing area: 417 sq ft (38.8 m^{2})
- Empty weight: 1,966 lb (892 kg)
- Gross weight: 2,740 lb (1,243 kg)
- Powerplant: 1 × Beardmore 160 hp , 160 hp (119 kW)

Performance

- Maximum speed: 110 mph (176 km/h, 96 kn)
- Cruise speed: 83 mph (133 km/h, 72 kn)
- Endurance: 4.5 hours
