= No. 14 Squadron RAF =

Flying squadron of the Royal Air Force

- Squadron badge
- Active: 1915–1919; 1920–1945; 1945–1946; 1946–1962; 1962–1970; 1970–2011; 2011–present
- Country: United Kingdom
- Branch: Royal Air Force
- Type: Flying squadron
- Role: Intelligence, surveillance, target acquisition and reconnaissance (ISTAR)
- Part of: ISTAR Force
- Station: RAF Waddington
- Mottos: أنا نشر الأجنحة بلدي وابقي على وعد (Arabic for 'I spread my wings and keep my promise')
- Aircraft: Beechcraft Shadow R1/R2

Insignia
- Roundel
- Tail codes: BF (Apr 1939 – Sep 1939); CX (Sep 1944 – Jun 1945, Apr 1946 – Feb 1951); B (May 1953 – Jun 1955); AA–AZ; B (Jaguars); BA–BZ (Aug 1985 – Jun 2011)

Number 14 Squadron of the Royal Air Force currently operates the Beechcraft Shadow R1 (a modified Beechcraft Super King Air) in the intelligence, surveillance, target acquisition, and reconnaissance (ISTAR) role from RAF Waddington.

== History ==
=== First World War (1915–1919) ===
No. 14 Squadron of the Royal Flying Corps was formed on 3 February 1915 at Shoreham with Maurice Farman S.11 and Royal Aircraft Factory B.E.2 aircraft. After a few months of training at Hounslow and Fort Grange, Gosport it departed for the Middle East in November of that year for army co-operation duties during the Sinai and Palestine Campaign. In 1916, the squadron's B.E.2 aircraft were supplemented with a small number of Airco DH.1A two-seat fighters for escort duties, with the type remaining in use until March 1917. Other fighters operated by the squadron's fighter flight included the Bristol Scout and Vickers F.B.19, but the fighter flight left the squadron in August 1917 to form No. 111 Squadron. The squadron flew in support of British forces in the Third Battle of Gaza in late 1917. In November 1917 the squadron was equipped with Royal Aircraft Factory R.E.8, which were used to perform reconnaissance duties, attacking the Turkish Seventh Army as it retreated following the Battle of Nablus. The squadron was recalled to the UK in January 1919 and disbanded the following month.

=== Interwar years (1920–1938) ===
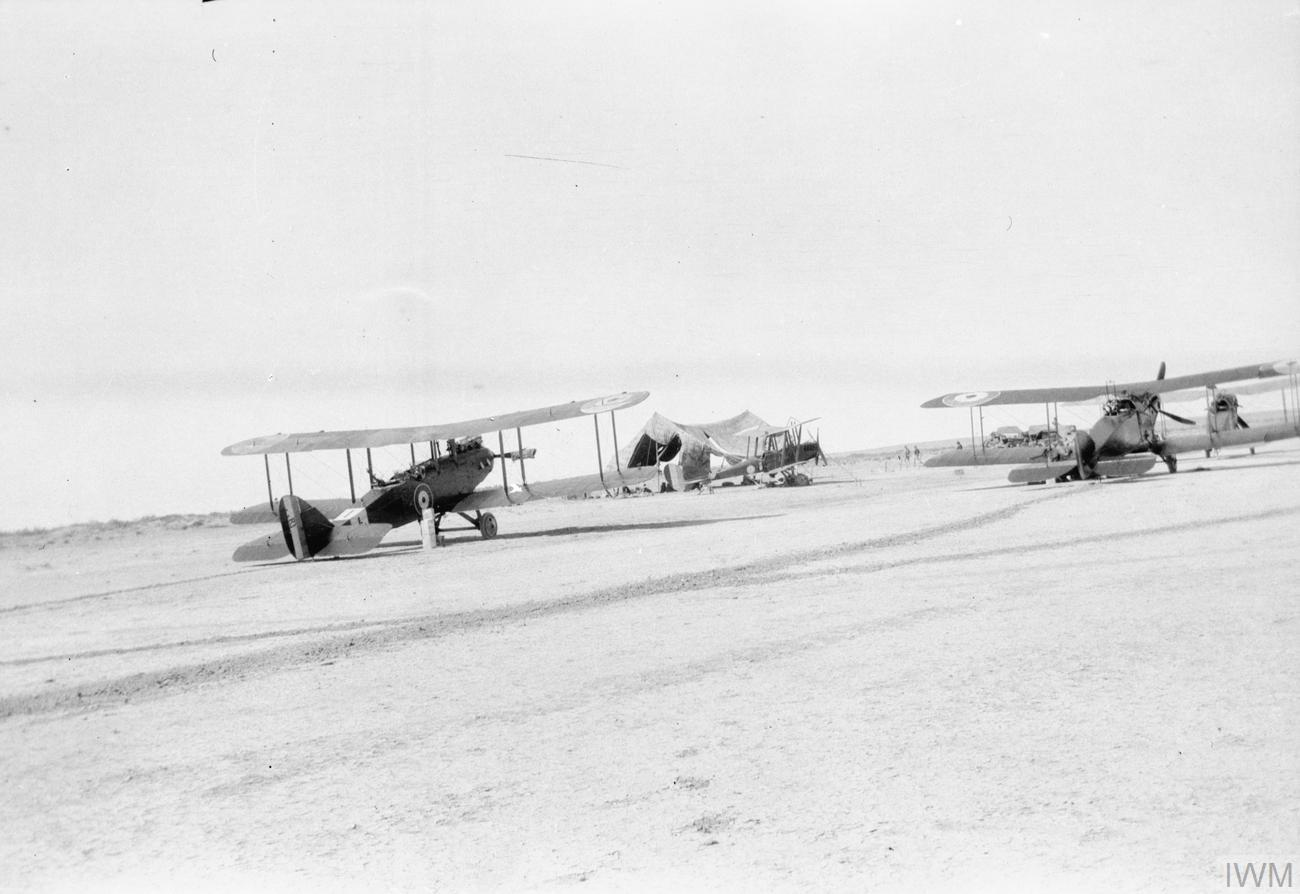
RAF aircraft at Azrak landing ground, including a Royal Aircraft Factory BE.2e of No. 14 Squadron (middle aircraft)

On 1 February 1920, No. 14 Squadron reformed in Ramleh, Israel, by renumbering No. 111 Squadron. The squadron operated Bristol F.2 Fighters and operated them in various roles including photo surveying and air policing. The squadron patrolled Trans-Jordan and Palestine for the next 20 years and it was during this period that the squadron gained its Arabic motto. Airco DH.9A bombers supplemented the squadron's Bristol Fighters in June 1924, using them to attack and together with RAF-operated armoured cars help defeat a several-thousand strong raiding force of Ikhwan tribesmen at Umm el Amad, 12 miles (19 km) south of Amman in Jordan in August that year. The squadron fully equipped with the DH.9A in January 1926. The Fairey IIIF replaced the DH.9A in November 1929, which were used on reconnaissance duties during civil unrest in Palestine. The Fairey Gordon, a radial engined derivative of the IIIF, re-equipped the squadron in September 1932, being used for operations against Arab rioters during the 1933 Palestine riots. In March 1938, the squadron replaced its Gordons with Vickers Wellesley monoplane bombers.

=== Second World War (1939–1945) ===
At the outbreak of Second World War the squadron was transferred to Egypt but soon returned to Amman. In May 1940, with the likelihood of war between Britain and Italy increasing rapidly, No. 14 Squadron was ordered to move to Port Sudan to reinforce the weak RAF forces in East Africa facing Italian forces in Ethiopia and Eritrea. On 10 June, Italy declared war on Britain and France, and on the night of 11–12 June No. 14 Squadron flew its first offensive mission of the Second World War, when nine Wellesleys bombed fuel storage tanks and the airfield at Massawa in Eritrea. The squadron lost its first Wellesley to Italian defences on 14 June during a second raid against Massawa. The squadron received a single Supermarine Walrus from No. 47 Squadron which was used for patrols over the Red Sea in July 1940, while the squadron's Wellesleys continued bombing missions against Italian targets.

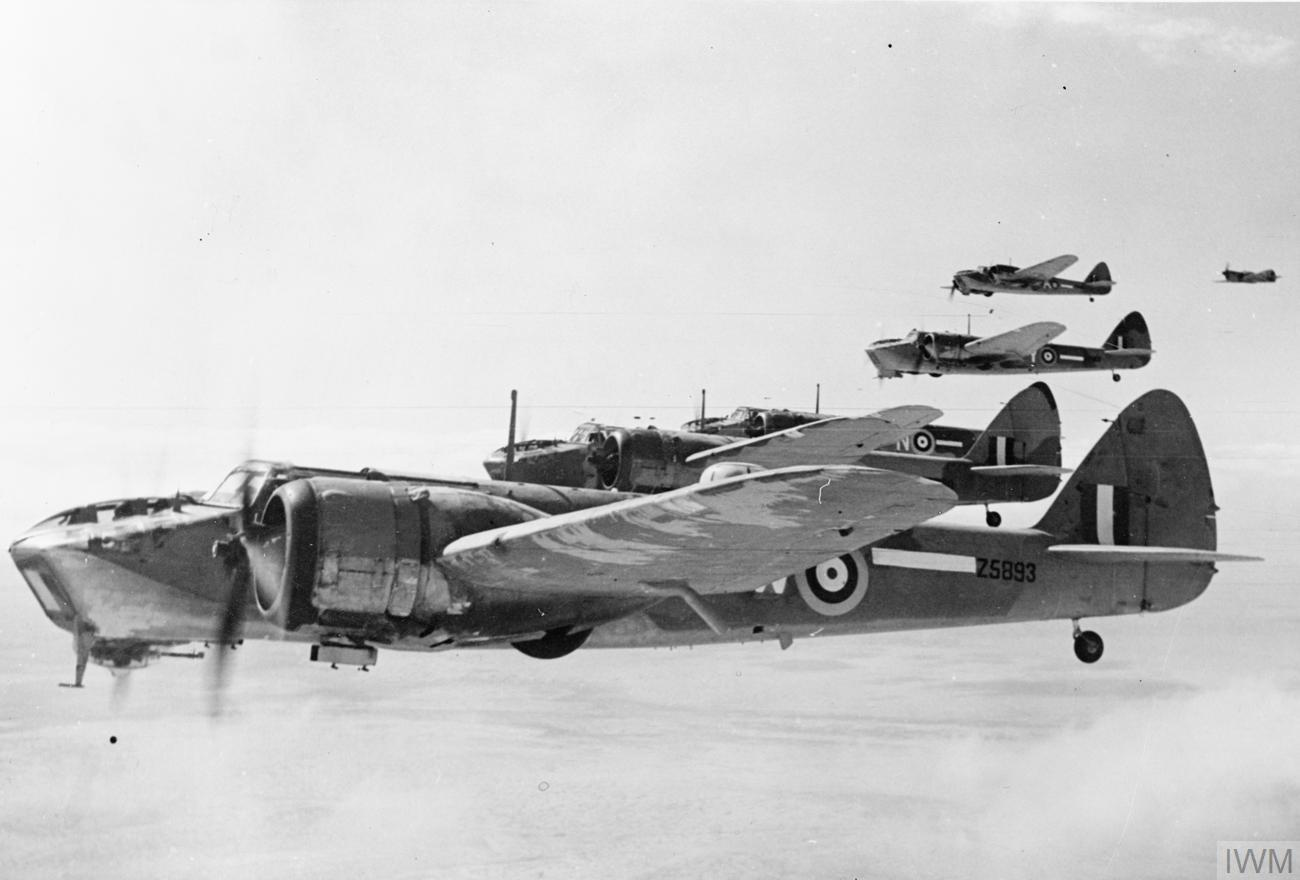
A formation of five Bristol Blenheims of No. 14 Squadron over the Western Desert in the early 1940s

The squadron started to receive twin-engined Bristol Blenheims in September that year, flying its first Blenheim mission on 20 September, and flying its final Wellesley sortie on 20 November. In March 1941 it carried out bombing raids in support of the assault on Keren.

In April 1941, following the liberation of Addis Ababa, the squadron was sent to Egypt for operations over the Western Desert. The squadron was deployed in support of Operation Brevity on 15–16 May 1941, an unsuccessful British offensive, and carried out attacks on German and Italian motor transport, with five Blenheims being shot down by Messerschmitt Bf 109 fighters of III Gruppe, Jagdgeschwader 27 while carrying out strafing attacks along the Tobruk–Capuzzo road on 21 May. The squadron flew attacks against Maleme Airfield on 25 and 27 May during the Battle of Crete, and in June, flew in support of Operation Battleaxe, another unsuccessful British offensive in the Western Desert. On 7 July 1941, the squadron withdrew from the Western Desert, being based in Palestine and Iraq until it returned to Egypt in November 1941.

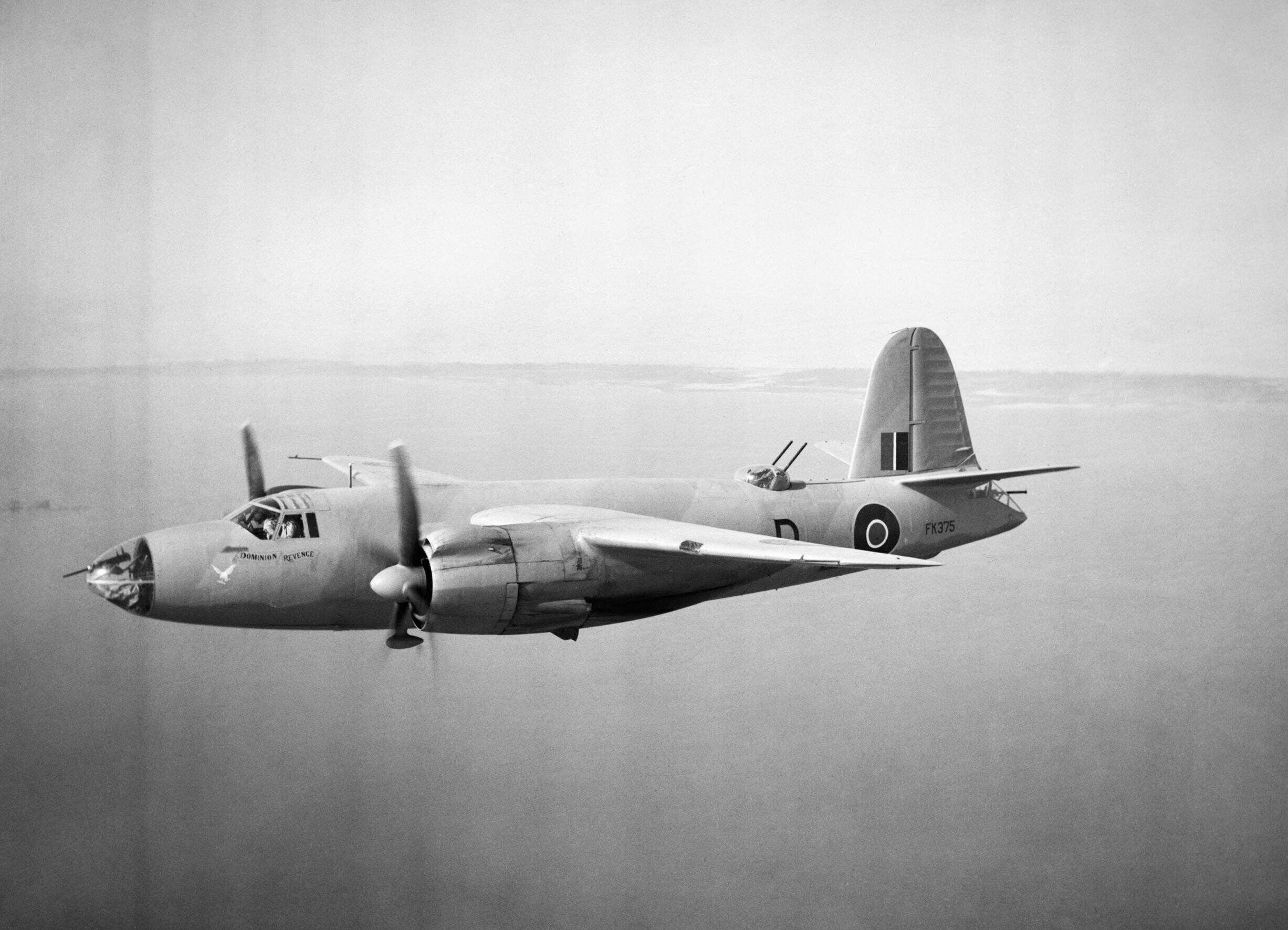
A Martin Marauder of No. 14 Squadron based at RAF Fayid, Egypt, in flight during 1942

On 17 August 1942, No. 14 Squadron was withdrawn from operations to convert to the Martin Marauder, the first RAF Squadron to operate the American bomber. The squadron flew its first operational mission with the Marauder, a maritime reconnaissance mission on 26 October 1942. The squadron used its Marauders for long-range maritime reconnaissance missions, minelaying and anti-shipping attack with torpedoes over the Aegean Sea. The squadron's Marauders sank a tanker with torpedoes on 19 January 1943 and two more merchant ships on 21 February. In March 1943, it started performing anti-submarine missions and long-range maritime reconnaissance missions, finding targets to be attacked by other anti-shipping units, operating out of Blida and then Maison Blanche in Algeria.

In May 1943 the squadron supplemented its Marauders by six former US Army Air Force (USAAF) P-51A Mustangs on loan, which equipped an additional flight for offensive operations, but these were returned to the USAAF in July, the squadron continuing to operate the Marauder. It operated detachments in Italy and Sardinia, moving completely to Alghero in Sardinia in June 1944. In July 1944, the squadron began to operate maritime patrol operations in conjunction with the Bristol Beaufighters of No. 39 Squadron, with a Marauder cruising offshore and directing Beaufighters to attack any shipping spotted. The squadron flew its last Marauder mission on 21 September that year, leaving its equipment behind when it transferred back to the UK.

The squadron operated within RAF Coastal Command from 24 October 1944. On its return to the UK, the squadron was based at RAF Chivenor in Devon and carried out anti-submarine mission over the Western Approaches and the Bay of Biscay using the Vickers Wellington Mk.XIV. The squadron was again disbanded on 1 June 1945 but was reborn the same day, when personnel from No. 143 Squadron at RAF Banff in Aberdeenshire, equipped with the de Havilland Mosquito Mk.VI in the anti-shipping strike role, were recruited.

=== Cold War (1946–1990) ===
No. 14 Squadron again disbanded on 31 March 1946. Disbandment did not last long however, the following day No. 128 Squadron, operating the Mosquito B.XVI at RAF Wahn in Germany, was renumbered No. 14 Squadron. In December 1947, the Mosquito B.XVI was replaced with the Mosquito B.35 variant. The squadron moved to RAF Celle in September 1949, but this was a short placement as it moved again in November 1950, this time to RAF Fassberg. In 1951 the squadron received the de Havilland Vampire FB.5 to replace the Mosquitoes, while in 1953 the Vampires were replaced by the de Havilland Venom FB.1. The squadron converted to the day-fighter role when it received Hawker Hunter F.4 in 1955 while based at RAF Oldenburg, where they stayed for two years before moving to RAF Ahlhorn. The squadron used the Hunter until 17 December 1962, when the unit was disbanded at RAF Gutersloh. The same day however No. 88 Squadron was renumbered No.14 Squadron, flying the English Electric Canberra B(I).8 from RAF Wildenrath.

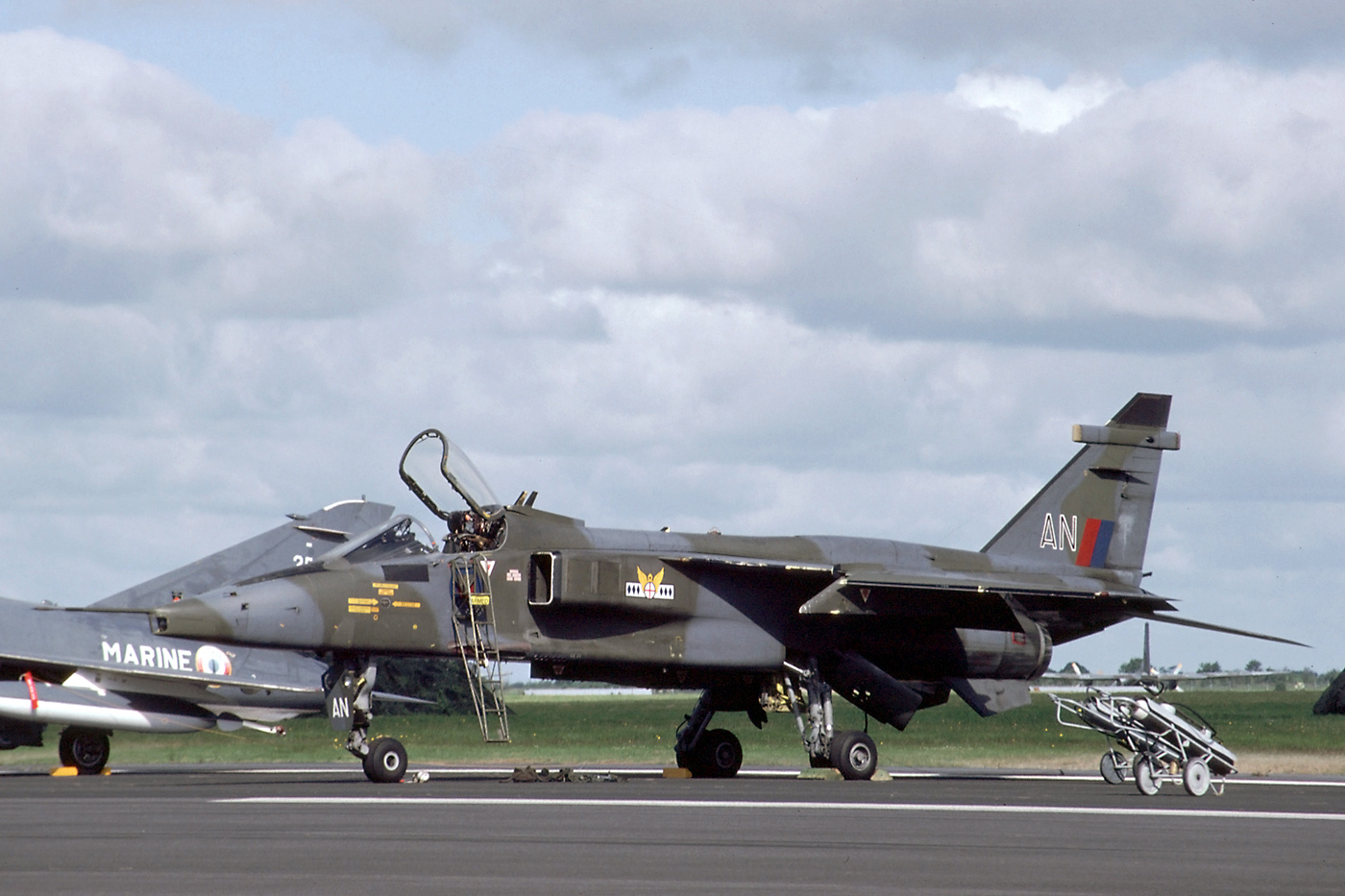
A SEPECAT Jaguar GR1 of No. 14 Squadron in 1985

On 30 June 1970, the squadron was reformed at RAF Brüggen, and operated the McDonnell Douglas Phantom FGR.2 until April 1975, when they were replaced with the SEPECAT Jaguar GR1 From 1976, the squadron's role at Brüggen, assigned to NATO's Supreme Allied Commander Europe, was support of the army in a European land battle, first in a conventional role, and later in a nuclear delivery role should tactical nuclear weapons be used. The squadron's twelve Jaguars were expected by RAF planning staff to suffer attrition of one third their strength, leaving sufficient survivors to deliver their stockpile of eight WE.177 nuclear bombs.

From 1985, the squadron's twelve Jaguars were exchanged for twelve Panavia Tornado GR1, for use in a similar role. The Tornados were capable of carrying two WE.177, and the RAF staff expected that there would be enough survivors of the conventional war phase to deliver an increased stock of eighteen bombs. The squadron's role operating the WE.177 was programmed to remain in place until the mid-1990s.

In August 1990, the squadron was dispatched to Bahrain in response to the Iraqi invasion of Kuwait as part of Operation Granby, along with two other squadrons from Brüggen, No. 9 Squadron and No. 31 Squadron.

=== 21st century (2001–present) ===
==== Iraq and Afghanistan ====
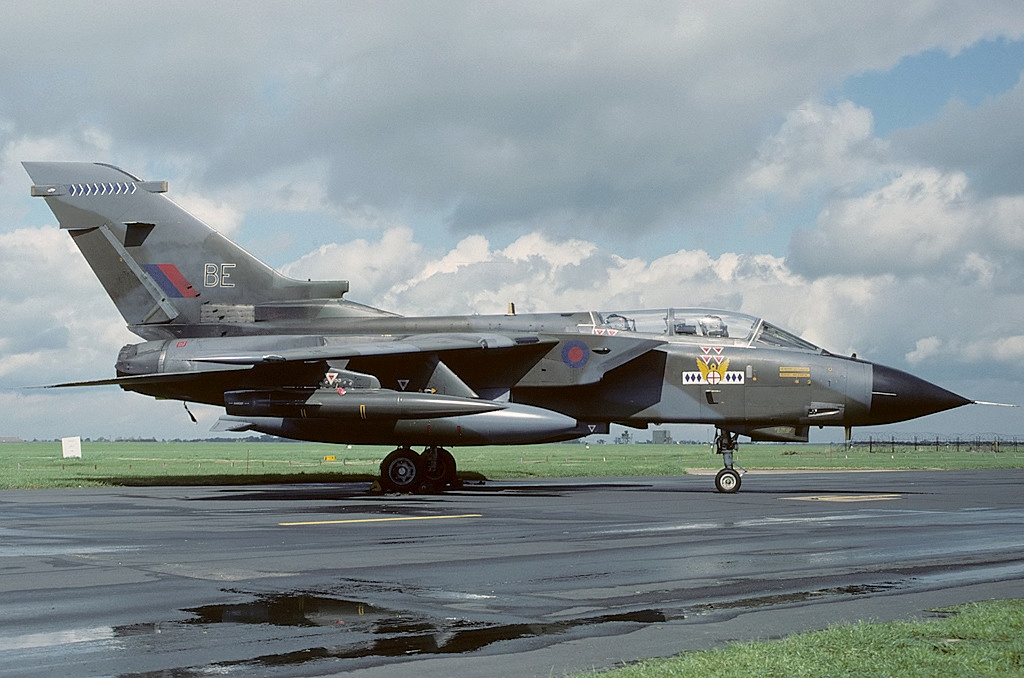
A Panavia Tornado GR1 of No. 14 Squadron in 1989

The squadron returned to the UK from Germany in January 2001. It operated from RAF Lossiemouth, specialising in low level Thermal Imaging Airborne Laser Designator (TIALD); night electro-optical low level flying; and operational low flying. It participated in Operation Resinate (South), flying sorties from Ali Al Salem Air Base, Kuwait until January 2003. The squadron returned to Ali Al Salem in August 2003 as part of Operation Telic (phase 4). In September 2003, six Tornados took off from Ali Al Salem for the last time and started flying operational missions over Iraq and landing at Al Udeid Air Base in Qatar.

Four crews from the squadron took part in the first detachment of Tornado GR Force personnel to Operation Herrick in summer 2009. No. 14 Squadron carried out its only autonomous detachment to Kandahar in Afghanistan between November 2010 and February 2011, flying day and night in support of the International Security Assistance Force across Afghanistan. The squadron mounted ground alert as well as flying numerous planned reconnaissance sorties using the RAPTOR pod, and close air support sorties equipped with Paveway IV 500 lb bombs and dual mode seeker MBDA Brimstone missiles.

After its return to the UK in 2011, it was announced that the squadron would be disbanded as one of the two Tornado squadrons due to cease operations as part of the Strategic Defence and Security Review 2010, along with No. 13 Squadron based at RAF Marham.

The squadron ceased operations in March 2011, and, after a formal review by the Duke of York, was disbanded on 1 June 2011. Squadron Leader Eric Aldrovandi, a Burmese python, who had served as the squadron mascot since it re-equipped with the Tornado in 1985, took the opportunity to retire and was transferred to Amazonia, a visitor attraction at Strathclyde Country Park.

==== Tactical intelligence, surveillance and reconnaissance role ====
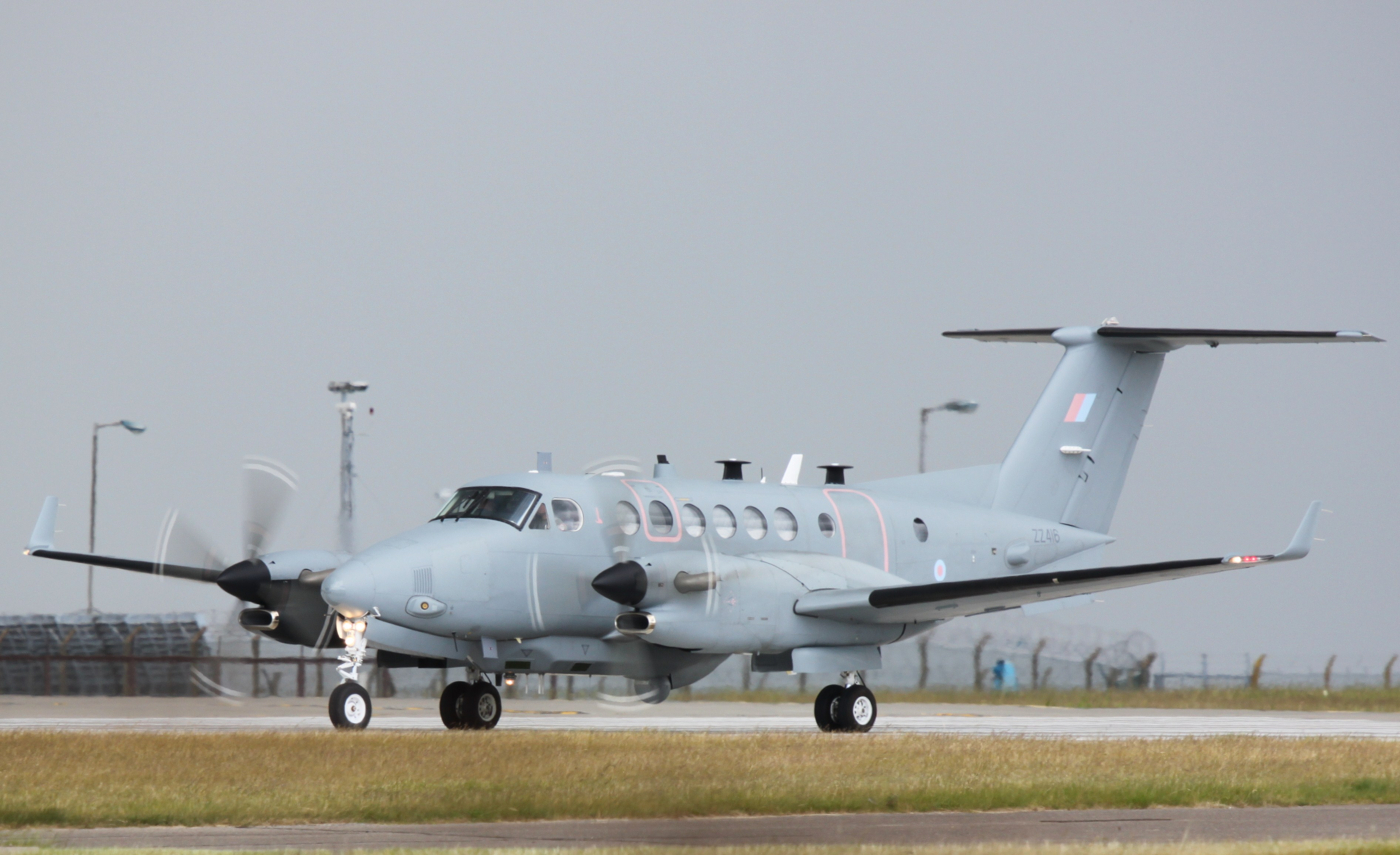
A Beechcraft Shadow R1 in June 2011

No. 14 Squadron re-formed on 14 October 2011 at RAF Waddington, Lincolnshire, operating the Beechcraft Shadow R1 in the tactical intelligence, surveillance and reconnaissance role, an activity which had previously been operated as a flight of No. 5 Squadron.

From September 2014, due to the resurfacing of RAF Waddington's runway which took over a year to complete, No.14 Squadron and No. 5 Squadron temporarily operated from RAF Coningsby, Lincolnshire.

It was announced in 2017 that the squadron's fleet of five Shadow R1 would be increased by three and further upgrades would be funded.

== Aircraft operated ==
Aircraft operated included:

- Royal Aircraft Factory B.E.2c (1915–1917)
- Airco DH.1A (1916–1917)
- Royal Aircraft Factory R.E.8 (1917–1918)
- Bristol F.2 Fighter (1920–1930s)
- Airco DH.9A (1924–1929)
- Fairey IIIF (1929–1932)
- Fairey Gordon (1932)
- Vickers Wellesley Mk.I (1938–1940)
- Bristol Blenheim Mk.IV (1940–1942)
- Martin Marauder Mk.I (1942–1944)
- North American P-51A Mustang
- Vickers Wellington Mk.XIV (1944–1945)
- de Havilland Mosquito Mk.VI, B.16 and B.35 (1945–1951)
- de Havilland Vampire FB.5 (1951–1955)
- de Havilland Venom FB.1 (1953–1955)
- Hawker Hunter F.4 and F.6 (1955–1962)
- English Electric Canberra B(I).8 (1962–1970)
- McDonnell Douglas Phantom FGR.2 (1970–1975)
- SEPECAT Jaguar GR1 (1975–1985)
- Panavia Tornado GR1 and GR1A (1985–2004)
- Panavia Tornado GR4 (2004–2011)
- Beechcraft Shadow R1 (2011–present)

== Heritage ==
=== Badge and motto ===
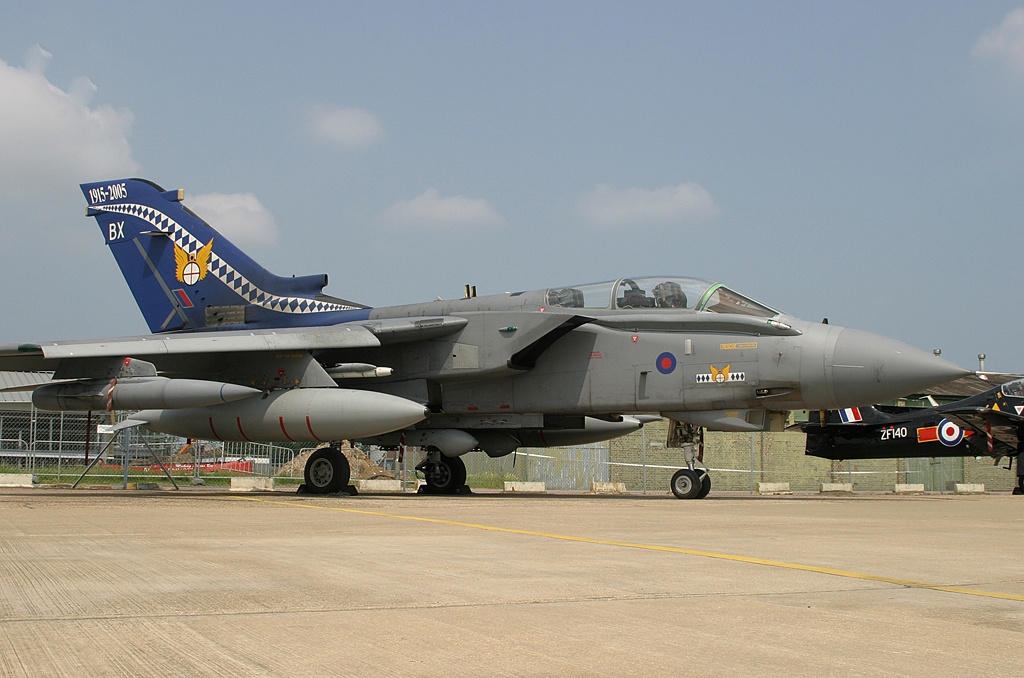
A Panavia Tornado GR4 wearing a paint scheme celebrating the 90th anniversary of No. 14 Squadron in 2007

The squadron's heraldic badge features a winged plate charged with a cross throughout and shoulder pieces of a suit of armour. The badge was approved by King George VI in May 1937 and represents a crusader in association with the Cross of St George, reflecting the squadron's close First World War association with Diospolis, Palestine, the reputed burial place of the Saint, and its location in the Middle East at the time of submission to the Chester Herald.

No. 14 Squadron's motto is أنا نشر الأجنحة بلدي وابقي على وعد (Arabic for 'I spread my wings and keep my promise'). According to the RAF, is it an extract from the Quran as suggested to the RAF by the Emir of Transjordan. However in Arabic, this is not quite as depicted on the squadron badge.

=== Nickname ===
The unofficial nickname of No. 14 Squadron was the Crusaders, after the Crusades religious wars between Christians and Muslims during the Middle Ages. The nickname reflected the squadron's association with the Middle East during the First World War. The use of the nickname ceased in 2024 after a complaint from a member of the RAF that it was offensive to Muslims was partially upheld.

== Battle honours ==
No. 14 Squadron has received the following battle honours. Those marked with an asterisk (*) may be emblazoned on the squadron standard.

- Egypt (1915–1917)*
- Gaza*
- Megiddo (1918)*
- Arabia (1916–1917)*
- Palestine (1917–1918)*
- Transjordan (1924)
- Palestine (1936–1939)
- East Africa (1940–1941)*
- Mediterranean (1941–1943)*
- Egypt and Libya (1941–1942)*
- Sicily (1943)*
- Atlantic (1945)*
- Gulf (1991)*
- Kosovo (1999)
- Iraq (2003–2011)

== See also ==
- List of Royal Air Force aircraft squadrons
