= Abdur Rahman Khel =

- Location within Pakistan
- Coordinates: 32.56°N 69.65°E
- Country: Pakistan
- Territory: Federally Administered Tribal Areas
- Elevation: 2,417 m (7,930 ft)
- Time zone: UTC+5 (PST)
  - Summer (DST): UTC+6 (PDT)

Abdur Rahman Khel is a town in the Federally Administered Tribal Areas of Pakistan. It is located at 32°33'42N 69°39'3E with an altitude of 2,417 metres (7,930 ft).
