= Vickers F.B.14 =

British fighter/reconnaissance biplane

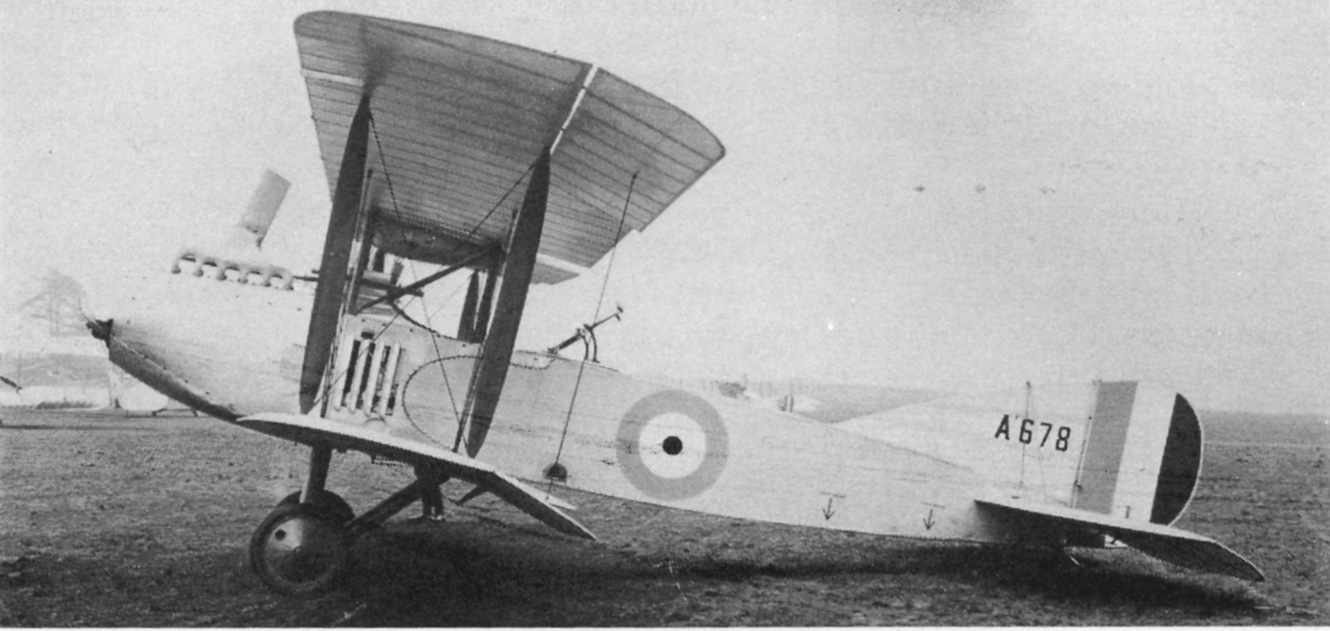

General information
- Type: Fighter, reconnaissance biplane
- National origin: United Kingdom
- Manufacturer: Vickers
- Primary user: Royal Flying Corps
- Number built: 100+

History
- First flight: 1916

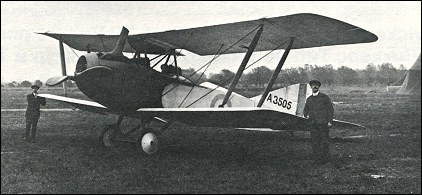

The Vickers F.B.14 was a British two-seat fighter/reconnaissance biplane designed and built by Vickers Limited. About 100 were built for the Royal Flying Corps but saw only limited use as it was designed for a larger engine which was not available when production commenced and it did not meet performance expectations.

== Design and development ==
The F.B.14 was a conventional single-bay biplane with two tandem open cockpits and a fixed tailskid landing gear. It was designed to use a new engine, the 230 hp (170 kW) BHP inline engine (later to become the Siddeley Puma). The steel-tube airframe was completed in mid-1916, but the engine was not ready and it was fitted with a 160 hp (120 kW) Beardmore engine instead. The aircraft was underpowered with the Beardmore engine and suffered reliability problems and over 50 production aircraft were delivered to the Royal Flying Corps without engines. A more reliable engine was tested, but the 120 hp (90 kW) Beardmore did not help meet the performance required. Attempts to fit alternate engines resulted in a number of variants with the most successful being a Rolls-Royce Eagle IV Vee engine. The aircraft performance was inferior to the contemporary Bristol F.2B, however, and further development of the F.B.14 was abandoned.

The F.B.14 saw limited operational use, with some being sent to Mesopotamia, with seven being used in home defence squadrons. The Rolls-Royce powered F.B.14D, while being used for testing of an experimental gunsight at Orfordness on 22 July 1917, engaged in a German air raid and claimed an unconfirmed shoot-down of a Gotha bomber off Zeebrugge. (Note: While one Gotha was shot down just off Ostend on 22 July, it is likely that this was due to a Bristol F.2B Fighter of No. 48 Squadron RFC.)

== Variants ==
F.B.14
Production aircraft powered by a 160 hp (120 kW) Beardmore engine, 104 built by Vickers at Weybridge.
F.B.14A
Re-engined with a 150 hp (110 kW) Lorraine-Dietrich Vee engine, one built.
F.B.14D
Re-engined with a 250 hp (190 kW) Rolls-Royce Eagle IV engine and fitted with increased span two-bay wings.
F.B.14F
Re-engined with a 150 hp (112 kW) RAF 4a air-cooled V-12 engine.

== Operators ==
United Kingdom

- Royal Flying Corps

== Specifications (F.B.14) ==
Data from Vickers Aircraft since 1908

General characteristics

- Crew: 2
- Length: 28 ft 5 in (8.66 m)
- Upper wingspan: 39 ft 6 in (12.04 m)
- Lower wingspan: 33 ft 0 in (10.06 m)
- Height: 10 ft 0 in (3.05 m)
- Wing area: 427 sq ft (39.7 m^{2})
- Empty weight: 1,662 lb (754 kg)
- Gross weight: 2,603 lb (1,181 kg)
- Powerplant: 1 × Beardmore 160 hp water-cooled straight-six engine

Performance

- Maximum speed: 99.5 mph (160.1 km/h, 86.5 kn) at sea level
- Endurance: 3 hr 45 min
- Service ceiling: 10,000 ft (3,000 m) ; Absolute ceiling 10,600 ft (3,200 m)
- Time to altitude: 40 min 45 s to 10,000 ft (3,000 m)

Armament

- Guns:
  - 1 × forward-firing .303 in (7.7 mm) Vickers machine gun
  - 1 × .303 in (7.7 mm) Lewis Gun fitted on a Scarff ring in rear cockpit

== See also ==
Related lists

- List of aircraft of the Royal Flying Corps
