= Airco DH.3 =

DH.3
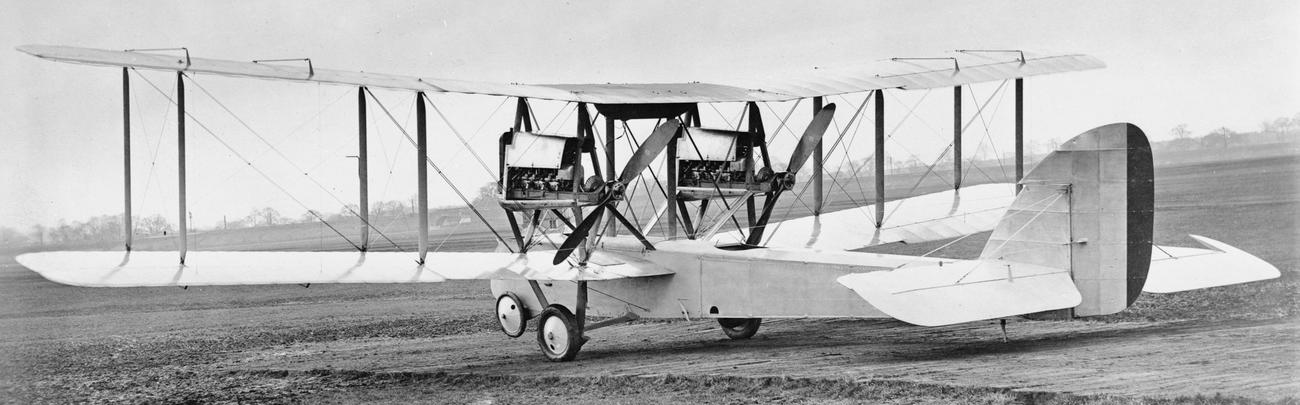
- Airco DH.3

General information
- Type: Biplane bomber
- Manufacturer: Airco
- Designer: Geoffrey de Havilland
- Status: Prototype
- Number built: 2

History
- First flight: before May 1916
- Developed into: Airco DH.10 Amiens

The Airco DH.3 was a British bomber aircraft of the First World War. The DH.3 was designed in 1916 as a long-range day bomber by Geoffrey de Havilland, chief designer at the Aircraft Manufacturing Company. It was a large biplane with wide-span three-bay wings, slender fuselage, and a curved rudder. It was powered by two 120 hp (89 kW) Beardmore engines, mounted as pushers between the wings. In addition to tailskid landing gear, two wheels were placed under the nose to prevent it from tipping over on the nose.

A second prototype, designated DH.3A, was built with more powerful 160 hp (120 kW) Beardmore engines, and the War Office placed a production order for 50. This order was cancelled before any could be completed, possibly because the climb rate was still far too low, with it taking 58 minutes to reach 6,500 feet, and the other contender, the Royal Aircraft Factory F.E.4 was even worse, which made strategic bombing with these machines impracticable. The two prototypes were scrapped in 1917.

The DH.10 Amiens was developed from the DH.3A with much more powerful engines (boosting installed power from 320 hp (240 kW) to nearly 800 hp (600 kW)) and some detail changes were made. This development first flew in March 1918, but was too late to see squadron service during the war.

== Specifications (DH.3) ==
Data from De Havilland Aircraft since 1909

General characteristics

- Crew: three
- Length: 36 ft 10 in (11.23 m)
- Wingspan: 60 ft 10 in (18.54 m)
- Height: 14 ft 6 in (4.42 m)
- Wing area: 793 sq ft (73.7 m^{2})
- Empty weight: 3,980 lb (1,805 kg)
- Gross weight: 5,810 lb (2,635 kg)
- Powerplant: 2 × Beardmore 120 hp water-cooled straight-six engines, 120 hp (89 kW) each
- Propellers: 4-bladed wood fixed pitch propeller, 9 ft 6 in (2.90 m) diameter

Performance

- Maximum speed: 95 mph (153 km/h, 83 kn)
- Range: 700 mi (1,100 km, 610 nmi)
- Endurance: 8 hr
- Rate of climb: 550 ft/min (2.8 m/s)

Armament

- Guns: 2 × flexibly mounted .303 in (7.7 mm) Lewis guns
- Bombs: up to 680 lb (310 kg) bombs

== See also ==
Related development

- Airco DH.10 Amiens

Aircraft of comparable role, configuration, and era

- Nieuport London
- Vickers Vimy

Related lists

- List of bomber aircraft
