= Royal Aircraft Factory R.E.5 =

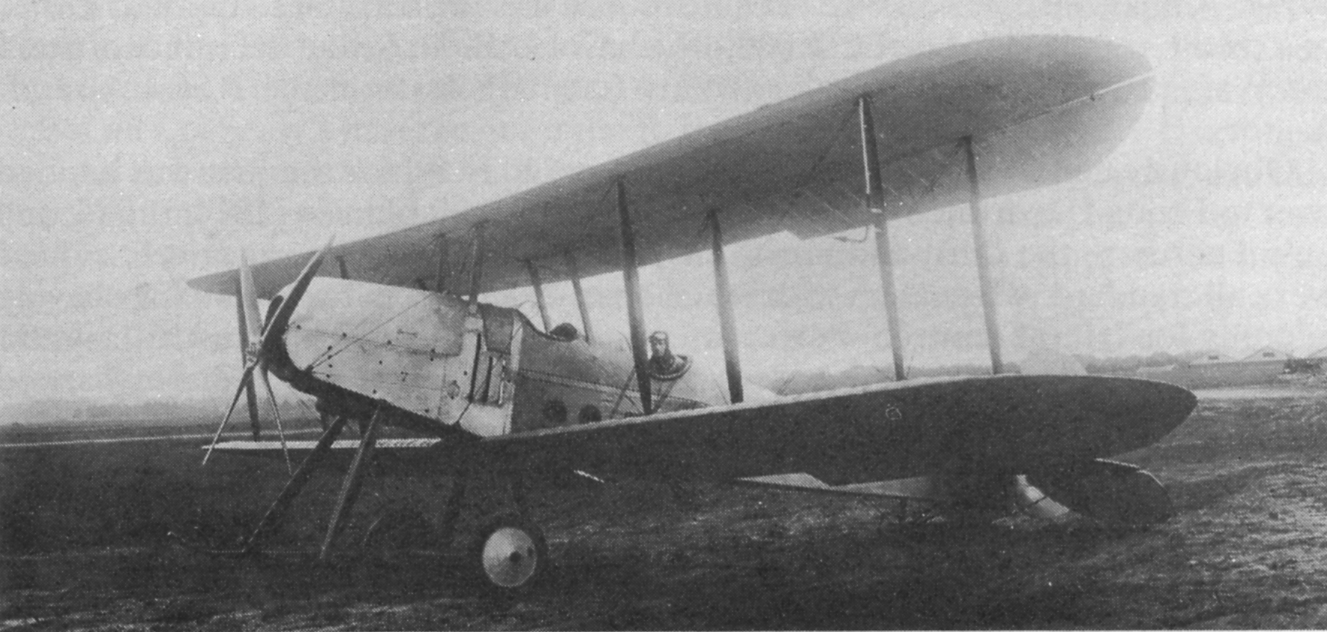

General information
- Type: Reconnaissance and artillery observation biplane
- Manufacturer: Royal Aircraft Factory
- Primary user: Royal Flying Corps
- Number built: 24

History
- Introduction date: 1914
- First flight: 1914
- Variant: Royal Aircraft Factory R.E.7

The Royal Aircraft Factory R.E.5 was a British two-seat reconnaissance and artillery observation biplane designed and built by the Royal Aircraft Factory for the Royal Flying Corps.

== Development ==
The R.E.5 was designed as a reconnaissance biplane using the experience of earlier R.E. series aircraft. It was a two-bay equal-span biplane with a fixed tailskid landing gear, with the wheels supported on skids and powered by a nose-mounted 120 hp (89 kW) Austro-Daimler engine driving a four-bladed propeller. The aircraft had two open cockpits with the observer/gunner in the forward cockpit under the upper wing and the pilot aft. The larger more capable Royal Aircraft Factory R.E.7 was a further development of the design. Some modified single-seat high altitude aircraft were built with extended-span (57 ft 2⅓ in or 17.43 m) upper wings supported by a pair of outward-leaning struts. Other R.E.5s were used for experimentation with airbrakes and for test flying the Royal Aircraft Factory 4 engine.

Twenty four R.E.5s were built at the Royal Aircraft Factory for the RFC, paid for by money given to the British Army to compensate for the transfer of the army's airships to the Royal Navy.

== Operational history ==
Six R.E.5s deployed to France in September 1914, partly equipping No. 2 Squadron RFC, with further examples being by other squadrons, with no unit being completely equipped with the R.E.5. In total, eleven R.E.5s were sent to France, with a further nine being used by training units.

The R.E.5s were used for reconnaissance and bombing missions over France, although at first they were not fitted with bomb-sights or bomb racks, bombs being carried in the observer's cockpit and dropped by hand when the aircraft was over the target.

Captain John Aidan Liddell was awarded the Victoria Cross for an action on 31 July 1915, being badly wounded when flying an R.E.5 but successfully recovering the aircraft and saving his observer. The R.E.5 was gradually phased out from front-line service during that year, only two remaining at the front on 25 September 1915.

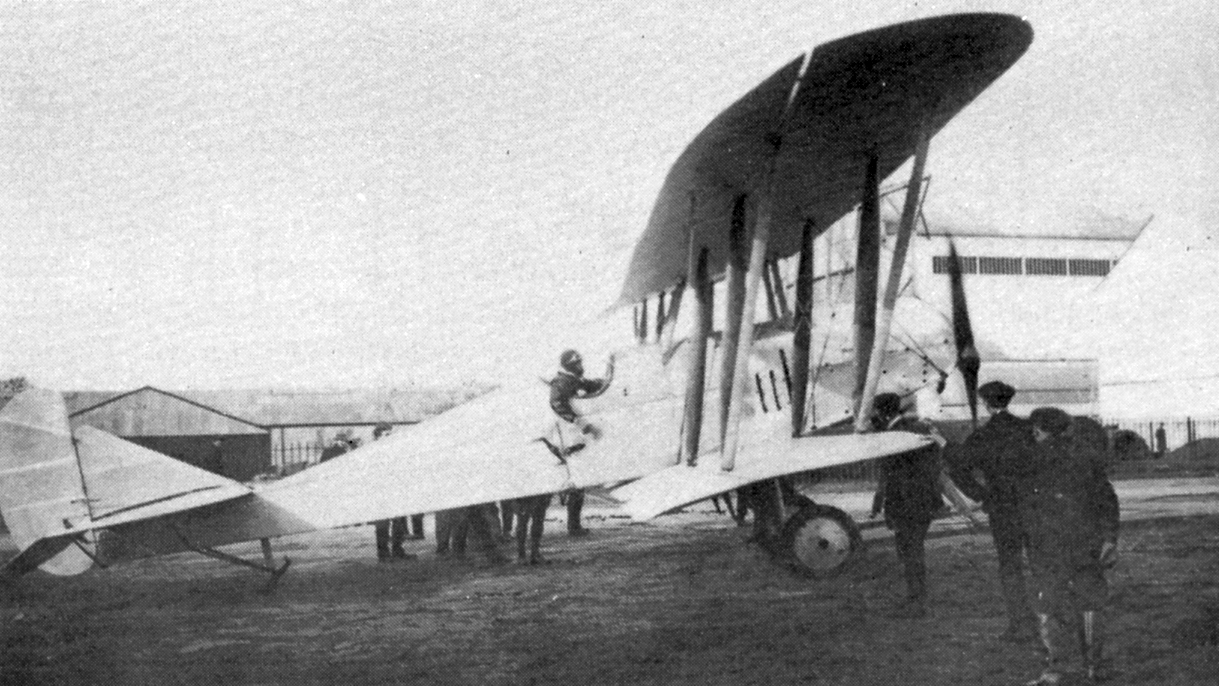
Preparations for the altitude record flight on 14 May 1914

One of the aircraft with extended upper wings set a new world altitude record of 18,900 ft (5,760 m) on 14 May 1914, piloted by Norman Spratt.

== Operator ==
United Kingdom

- Royal Flying Corps
  - No. 2 Squadron RFC
  - No. 6 Squadron RFC
  - No. 7 Squadron RFC
  - No. 12 Squadron RFC
  - No. 16 Squadron RFC
  - No. 19 Squadron RFC
- Royal Naval Air Service

== Specifications ==
General characteristics

- Crew: 2 (pilot, observer/gunner)
- Length: 26 ft 2 in (7.98 m)
- Wingspan: 44 ft 6 in (13.57 m)
- Height: 9 ft 8 in (2.95 m)
- Wing area: 498 sq ft (46.3 m^{2})
- Powerplant: 1 × Austro-Daimler piston engine , 120 hp (89 kW)

Performance

- Maximum speed: 78 mph (126 km/h, 68 kn)

Armament

- 3 × 20 lb (9 kg) bombs

== See also ==
Related lists

- List of aircraft of the Royal Flying Corps
