= Royal Aircraft Factory R.E.7 =

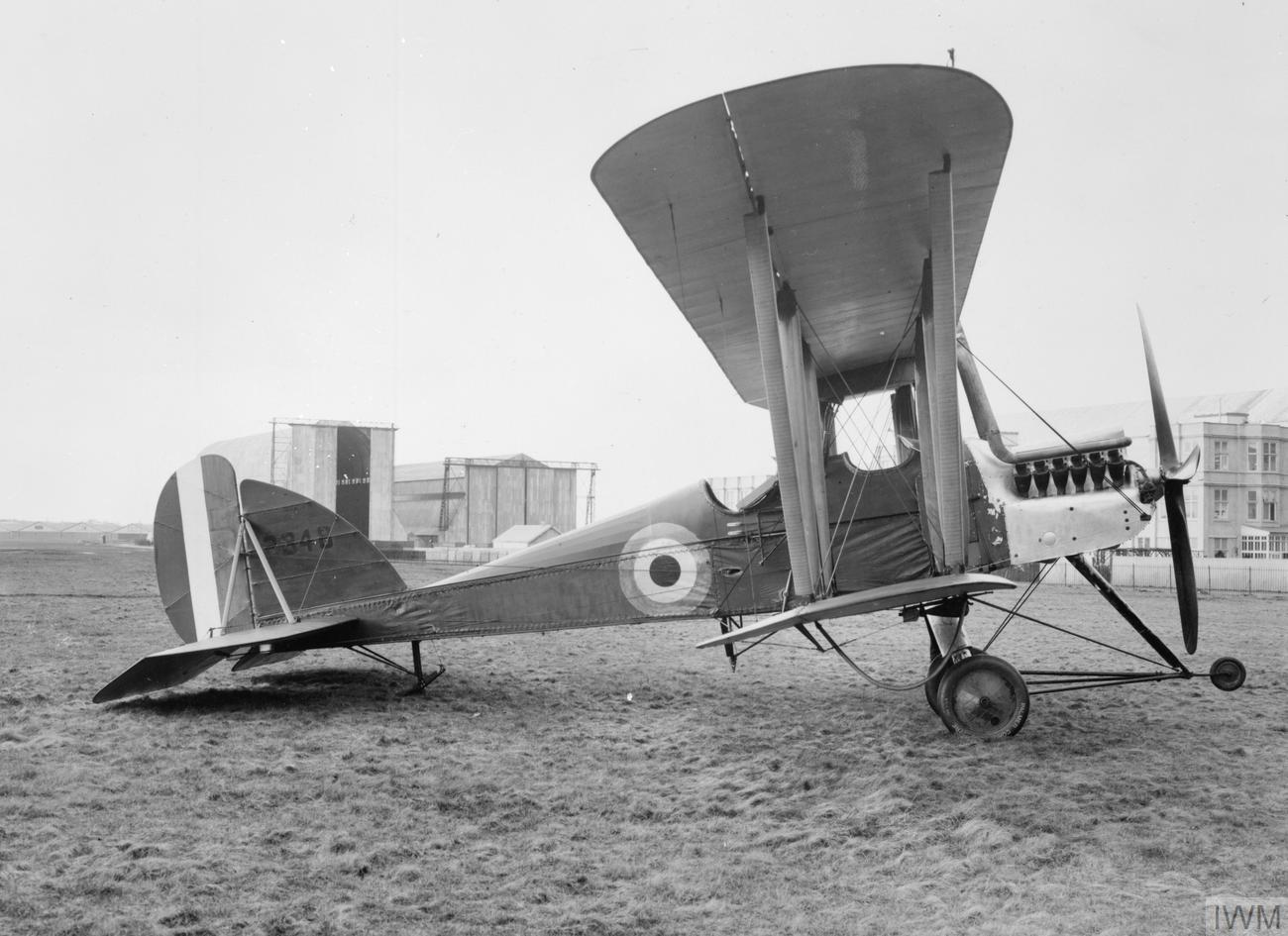
- RAF 4a powered R.E.7

General information
- Type: Light bomber and reconnaissance biplane
- Manufacturer: Royal Aircraft Factory
- Primary user: Royal Flying Corps
- Number built: 230

History
- Introduction date: 1915
- First flight: 1915
- Developed from: Royal Aircraft Factory R.E.5

The Royal Aircraft Factory R.E.7 was a British two-seat light bomber and reconnaissance biplane designed by the Royal Aircraft Factory and built under contracts by the Coventry Ordnance Works, Austin, Napier and Siddeley-Deasy for the Royal Flying Corps.

== Development ==
Developed from the R.E.5 the R.E.7 was designed to carry heavier loads and also suitable for escort and reconnaissance duties. It was an-unequal span biplane with a fixed tailskid landing gear and powered by a nose-mounted 120 hp (89 kW) Beardmore engine driving a four-bladed propeller. The aircraft was built by a number of different contractors with the first aircraft operational with the Royal Flying Corps in France in early 1916. The aircraft had two open cockpits with the observer/gunner in the forward cockpit under the upper wing and the pilot aft.

== Operational history ==
It was soon found that the aircraft could not be used as an escort due to the limited field of fire for the single Lewis gun but the R.E.7 had a useful payload and was soon used as a light bomber with the more powerful engine (either a 150 hp (112 kW) RAF 4a or 160 hp (119 kW) Beardmore). Over a quarter of the aircraft built were used in France in the middle of 1916 but their slow speed and low ceiling with a bomb load made them vulnerable to attack. The R.E.7s were withdrawn and used for training and a number were used as engine test beds. Use was made of them as target tugs trailing a sleeve drogue for air-to-air firing practice, probably one of the first aircraft to do this.

At least two R.E.7s were converted to three seaters.

== Operators ==
United Kingdom

- Royal Flying Corps
  - No. 9 Squadron RFC
  - No. 12 Squadron RFC
  - No. 19 Squadron RFC
  - No. 20 Squadron RFC
  - No. 21 Squadron RFC
  - No. 37 Squadron RFC
  - No. 49 Squadron RFC

== Specifications (light bomber) ==
Data from The Illustrated Encyclopedia of Aircraft (Part Work 1982–1985). Orbis Publishing. p. 2820.

General characteristics

- Crew: 2 (pilot, observer/gunner)
- Length: 31 ft 10.5 in (9.72 m)
- Wingspan: 57 ft 0 in (17.37 m)
- Height: 12 ft 7 in (3.84 m)
- Wing area: 548 sq ft (50.91 m^{2})
- Empty weight: 2,285 lb (1,036 kg)
- Gross weight: 3,450 lb (1,565 kg)
- Powerplant: 1 × RAF 4a Vee piston engine , 150 hp (112 kW)

Performance

- Maximum speed: 84 mph (135 km/h, 73 kn)
- Endurance: 6 hours 0 minutes
- Service ceiling: 6,500 ft (1,980 m)

Armament

- 1 x 336lb (152kg) bomb or
- smaller bombs up to 324lb (147kg)

== See also ==
Related lists

- List of aircraft of the Royal Flying Corps
