= List of aircraft of the Royal Air Force =

Many aircraft types have served in the British Royal Air Force since its formation in April 1918 from the merger of the Royal Flying Corps and Royal Naval Air Service. This is a list of RAF aircraft, including all currently active and retired types listed in alphabetic order by their RAF type name. For just those aircraft currently in service, see List of active United Kingdom military aircraft. Aircraft operated with the Fleet Air Arm from 1924 until 1939 were operated by the Royal Air Force on behalf of the Navy and are included; those operated by the Royal Navy after it re-acquired control of the aircraft used to support its operations in 1939 are not, but all aircraft operated in conjunction with the Navy are listed at List of aircraft of the Fleet Air Arm. Army Air Corps aircraft are not included but can be found at List of aircraft of the Army Air Corps.

For aircraft operated before the merger of the RFC and RNAS in 1918:

- Refer to List of aircraft of the Royal Flying Corps
- Refer to List of aircraft of the Royal Naval Air Service

== Regular service with the RAF ==
Manufacturer	Type	Origin	Class	Role	Introduced	Retired	Engine(s)	Notes
Sopwith	1½ Strutter	UK	Propeller	Fighter/bomber/reconnaissance	1918	1920	Single-engined	piston biplane
Lockheed Martin	F-35B Lightning II	USA	Jet	Fighter/Stealth/Bomber	2018	In service	Single-engined	jet STOVL monoplane
Fairey	IIIC, D & F	UK	Propeller	Fleet spotter	1918	1941	Single-engined	piston biplane
Bristol	138	UK	Propeller	Research	1936	1937	Single-engined	piston monoplane
British Aerospace/ Hawker Siddeley	125	UK	Jet	Transport	1965	2015	Twin-engined	jet monoplane
British Aerospace	146	UK	Jet	Transport	1986	2022	Four-engined	jet monoplane
Short	184	UK	Propeller	Bomber	1918	1921	Single-engined	biplane floatplane
Short	320	UK	Propeller	Torpedo bomber	1918		Single-engined	biplane floatplane
Avro	504K & N	UK	Propeller	Trainer/communications	1918	1933	Single-engined	piston biplane
Agusta	A109E/A109SP	Italy	Rotorcraft	Liaison	2006	2024	Twin-engined	turboshaft helicopter
Bell	Airacobra	USA	Propeller	Fighter/ground attack	1941	1942	Single-engined	piston monoplane
Fairey	Albacore	UK	Propeller	Torpedo bomber	1940	1944	Single-engined	piston biplane
Armstrong Whitworth	Albemarle	UK	Propeller	Bomber/transport/glider tug	1943	1946	Twin-engined	piston monoplane
Avro	Aldershot	UK	Propeller	Long range day/night bomber	1924	1926	Single-engined	piston biplane
Avro	Andover	UK	Propeller	Transport/ambulance	1924		Single-engined	piston biplane
Hawker Siddeley	Andover	UK	Propeller	Transport	1965	1993	Twin-engined	turboprop monoplane
Avro	Anson	UK	Propeller	Bomber/maritime patrol/trainer/transport	1936	1968	Twin-engined	piston monoplane
Avro	Athena	UK	Propeller	Trainer	1950	1955	Single-engined	piston monoplane
Armstrong Whitworth/ Hawker Siddeley	Argosy	UK	Propeller	Transport	1962	1978	Four-engined	turboprop monoplane
Fairchild	Argus	USA	Propeller	Transport	1941	1945	Single-engined	piston monoplane
Airbus	Atlas C.1	Spain	Propeller	Transport	2014	In service	Four-engined	turboprop monoplane
Armstrong Whitworth	Atlas	UK	Propeller	Army co-operation/trainer	1927	1935	Single-engined	piston biplane
Hawker	Audax	UK	Propeller	Army co-operation	1931	1945	Single-engined	piston biplane
Taylorcraft	Auster AOP.6/AOP.9	UK	Propeller	Air Observation	1942	1954	Single-engined	piston monoplane
Auster	AOP.6/T.7/AOP.9	UK	Propeller	Air Observation	1945	1957	Single-engined	piston monoplane
Boulton Paul	Balliol	UK	Propeller	Trainer	1950	1957	Single-engined	piston monoplane
Martin	Baltimore	USA	Propeller	Medium bomber	1941	1946	Twin-engined	piston monoplane
Fairey	Barracuda	UK	Propeller	Torpedo/dive bomber	1943	1945	Single-engined	piston monoplane
Beagle	Basset	UK	Propeller	Communications transport	1965	1974	Twin-engined	piston monoplane
Fairey	Battle	UK	Propeller	Bomber	1937	1949	Single-engined	piston monoplane
Royal Aircraft Factory	B.E.2	UK	Propeller	Reconnaissance	1912	1919	Single-engined	piston biplane
Royal Aircraft Factory	B.E.12	UK	Propeller	Fighter	1918	1918	Single-engined	piston biplane
Bristol	Beaufighter	UK	Propeller	Strike fighter/night fighter/target tug	1940	1960	Twin-engined	piston monoplane
Bristol	Beaufort	UK	Propeller	Torpedo bomber	1939	1946	Twin-engined	piston monoplane
Short	Belfast	UK	Propeller	Transport	1966	1976	Four-engined	turboprop monoplane
Bristol/ Westland	Belvedere	UK	Rotorcraft	Transport	1961	1969	Twin-engined	turboshaft twin-rotor helicopter
Brewster	Bermuda	USA	Propeller	Dive bomber	1942	1944	Single-engined	piston monoplane
Blackburn	Beverley	UK	Propeller	Transport	1955	1967	Four-engined	piston monoplane
Avro	Bison	UK	Propeller	Fleet spotter	1922	1929	Single-engined	piston biplane
Blackburn	Blackburn	UK	Propeller	Fleet spotter	1923	1931	Single-engined	piston biplane
Bristol	Blenheim	UK	Propeller	Bomber	1937	1944	Twin-engined	piston monoplane
Bristol	Bombay	UK	Propeller	Bomber/transport	1939	1944	Twin-engined	piston monoplane
Douglas	Boston	USA	Propeller	Medium bomber/trainer/night fighter	1940	1945	Twin-engined	piston monoplane
Blackburn	Botha	UK	Propeller	Torpedo bomber/trainer	1939	1944	Twin-engined	piston monoplane
Bristol	Brigand	UK	Propeller	Torpedo fighter/medium bomber/naval strike/trainer	1946	1958	Twin-engined	piston monoplane
Bristol	F.2B Fighter	UK	Propeller	Fighter/army cooperation/light bomber	1918	1932	Single-engined	piston biplane
Bristol	Britannia	UK	Propeller	Transport	1959	1975	Four-engined	turboprop monoplane
Blackburn; Hawker Siddeley	Buccaneer	UK	Jet	Naval strike	1969	1994	Twin-engined	jet monoplane
Bristol	Buckingham	UK	Propeller	Bomber, transport	1944	1950	Twin-engined	piston monoplane
Bristol	Buckmaster	UK	Propeller	Trainer	1945	1958	Twin-engined	piston monoplane
Brewster	Buffalo	USA	Propeller	Fighter	1940	1942	Single-engined	piston monoplane
Bristol	Bulldog	UK	Propeller	Fighter/trainer	1929	1937	Single-engined	piston biplane
Scottish Aviation	Bulldog	UK	Propeller	Basic trainer	1972	2001	Single-engined	piston monoplane
Martinsyde	Buzzard	UK	Propeller	Fighter	1918	1922	Single-engined	piston biplane
Sopwith	Camel	UK	Propeller	Fighter	1918	1920	Single-engined	piston biplane
Fairey	Campania	UK	Propeller	Reconnaissance	1918	1919	Single-engined	piston biplane
English Electric	Canberra	UK	Jet	Bomber, photo reconnaissance, trainer	1951	2006	Twin-engined	jet monoplane
Consolidated	Catalina	USA	Propeller	Maritime patrol	1939	1945	Twin-engined	monoplane flying boat/amphibian
Boeing/ Boeing Vertol	Chinook	USA	Rotorcraft	Transport	1980	In service	Twin-engined	turboshaft twin-rotor helicopter
de Havilland Canada	Chipmunk (Note: UK variant completely redesigned from Canadian original and shared few interchangeable parts.)	UK	Propeller	Trainer	1949	1996	Single-engined	piston monoplane
de Havilland	Cirrus Moth	UK	Propeller	Communications/trainer	1926	1930	Single-engined	piston biplane
Curtiss	Cleveland	USA	Propeller	Dive-bomber	1940	1941	Single-engined	piston biplane
Handley Page	Clive	UK	Propeller	Transport	1931		Twin-engined	piston biplane
Saro	Cloud	UK	Propeller	Navigational trainer	1933	1936	Twin-engined	amphibious monoplane
de Havilland	Comet (Note: Racer evaluated as K5084)	UK	Propeller	Experimental	1935	1936	Twin-engined	piston monoplane
de Havilland	Comet	UK	Jet	Reconnaissance	1956	1975	Four-engined	jet monoplane
Consolidated	Coronado	USA	Propeller	Transport	1943	1946	Four-engined	monoplane flying boat
Fairchild	Cornell	USA	Propeller	Trainer	1943	1945	Single-engined	piston monoplane
Sopwith	Cuckoo	UK	Propeller	Torpedo bomber	1918	1923	Single-engined	piston biplane
Douglas	Dakota	USA	Propeller	Transport	1942	1970 (Note: One aircraft for training and support with Memorial Flight)	Twin-engined	piston monoplane
Blackburn	Dart	UK	Propeller	Torpedo bomber	1923	1933	Single-engined	piston biplane
Britten-Norman	Defender R.2/T.3 (Note: AL2 and T3 transferred from the Army on 2 April 2019. In July 2021, reported were retired from service on 30 June 2021.)	UK	Propeller	Trainer/Surveillance	2019	2021	Twin-engined	turboprop monoplane
Boulton Paul	Defiant	UK	Propeller	Fighter/night fighter/target tug	1939	1945	Single-engined	piston monoplane
Hawker	Demon	UK	Propeller	Fighter	1931	1939	Single-engined	piston biplane
de Havilland	Devon	UK	Propeller	Transport	1948	1984	Twin-engined	piston monoplane
Airco	DH.4A	UK	Propeller	Bomber/transport	1918		Single-engined	piston biplane
Airco	DH.6	UK	Propeller	Trainer	1918		Single-engined	piston biplane
Airco	DH.9	UK	Propeller	Bomber	1918		Single-engined	piston biplane
Airco	DH.9A (Note: The DH-9A wasn't a variant of the DH-9, but was instead entirely redesigned by Westland.)	UK	Propeller	Bomber	1918	1931	Single-engined	piston biplane
Airco	DH.10 Amiens	UK	Propeller	Bomber	1918	1923	Twin-engined	piston biplane
de Havilland	DH.86 Express	UK	Propeller	Transport	1937		Four-engined	piston biplane
Sopwith	Dolphin	UK	Propeller	Fighter	1918	1919	Single-engined	piston biplane
de Havilland	Dominie (Note: Dominie was the RAF's name for the Dragon Rapide - impressed examples retained original name)	UK	Propeller	Transport/trainer	1938	1946	Twin-engined	piston monoplane
Hawker Siddeley	Dominie	UK	Jet	Navigation trainer	1965	2011	Twin-engined	jet monoplane
de Havilland	Don	UK	Propeller	Trainer/communications/liaison	1938	1939	Single-engined	piston monoplane
Sopwith	Dragon	UK	Propeller	Fighter	1919	1919	Single-engined	piston biplane
Westland	Dragonfly	UK	Rotorcraft	Transport	1950	1956	Single-engined	piston helicopter
Airspeed	Envoy	UK	Propeller	Transport	1938		Twin-engined	piston monoplane
Beechcraft	Expeditor	USA	Propeller	Transport/trainer	1937		Twin-engined	piston monoplane
Miles	Falcon	UK	Propeller	Communications/trainer	1935		Single-engined	piston monoplane
Fairey	Fawn	UK	Propeller	Bomber	1924	1929	Single-engined	piston biplane
Royal Aircraft Factory	F.E.2d	UK	Propeller	Bomber	1918	1918	Single-engined	pusher biplane
Felixstowe	F.2A	UK	Propeller	Maritime patrol	1918		Twin-engined	biplane flying boat
Felixstowe	F.3	UK	Propeller	Maritime patrol	1918		Twin-engined	biplane flying boat
Felixstowe	F.5	UK	Propeller	Maritime patrol	1918	1925	Twin-engined	biplane flying boat
Slingsby	Firefly	UK	Propeller	Trainer	1995	2010	Single-engined	piston monoplane
Armstrong Whitworth	F.K.8	UK	Propeller	Artillery Spotter, Bomber	1918	1919	Single-engined	piston biplane
de Havilland	Flamingo (Note: Evaluation only, later impressed. RAF name was to have been Hertfordshire)	UK	Propeller	Transport	1939	1940	Twin-engined	piston monoplane
Boeing	Fortress	USA	Propeller	Bomber/maritime patrol/electronic warfare	1941	1945	Four-engined	piston monoplane
Fairey	Fox	UK	Propeller	Bomber/trainer	1926	1933	Single-engined	piston biplane
Hawker	Fury	UK	Propeller	Fighter	1931	1939	Single-engined	piston biplane
Gloster	Gamecock	UK	Propeller	Fighter	1926	1931	Single-engined	piston biplane
Gloster	Gauntlet	UK	Propeller	Fighter	1935	1939	Single-engined	piston biplane
Westland	Gazelle	UK	Rotorcraft	Trainer/VIP transport	1973		Single-engined	turboshaft helicopter
de Havilland	Genet Moth	UK	Propeller	Trainer	1927		Single-engined	piston biplane
de Havilland	Gipsy Moth	UK	Propeller	Trainer/communications	1930		Single-engined	piston biplane
Gloster	Gladiator	UK	Propeller	Fighter/meteorology	1937	1944	Single-engined	piston biplane
Boeing	C-17A Globemaster III	USA	Jet	Transport	2001	In service	Four-engined	jet monoplane
Folland/Hawker Siddeley	Gnat	UK	Jet	Trainer	1962	1979	Single-engined	jet monoplane
Fairey	Gordon	UK	Propeller	Bomber/trainer	1931	1941	Single-engined	piston biplane
Gloster	Grebe	UK	Propeller	Fighter	1923	1931	Single-engined	piston biplane
Bell	Griffin	Canada	Rotorcraft	Training; Search and rescue/support	1997	2023	Twin-engined	turboshaft helicopter
Waco	Hadrian	USA	Glider	Infantry glider	1943	1947	Nil	Glider
Handley Page	Halifax	UK	Propeller	Bomber/transport	1940	1952	Four-engined	piston monoplane
Fairey	Hamble Baby	UK	Propeller	Reconnaissance	1918		Single-engined	biplane floatplane
General Aircraft	Hamilcar	UK	Glider	Transport	1942	1950	Nil	Glider
Handley Page	Hampden	UK	Propeller	Bomber	1938	1945	Twin-engined	piston monoplane
Hawker	Hardy	UK	Propeller	Tropicalized general purpose/bomber	1935	1941	Single-engined	piston biplane
Hawker Siddeley/ BAe	Harrier	UK	Jet	Ground attack/reconnaissance/trainer	1969	1994	Single-engined	jet VTOL monoplane
British Aerospace	Harrier II	UK	Jet	Ground attack/reconnaissance/trainer	1989	2011	Single-engined	jet VTOL monoplane
Handley Page	Harrow	UK	Propeller	Torpedo bomber/Reconnaissance	1926	1928	Single-engined	piston biplane
Handley Page	Harrow	UK	Propeller	Bomber/transport	1937	1945	Twin-engined	piston monoplane
Hawker	Hart	UK	Propeller	Bomber/trainer	1930	1943	Single-engined	piston biplane
North American	Harvard	USA	Propeller	Trainer	1939	1955	Single-engined	piston monoplane
Handley Page	Hastings	UK	Propeller	Transport/trainer	1948	1977	Four-engined	piston monoplane
Douglas	Havoc	USA	Propeller	Medium bomber/night fighter	1940	1943	Twin-engined	piston monoplane
Hawker Siddeley/BAe	Hawk	UK	Jet	Trainer	1976	In service	Single-engined	jet monoplane
Hawker	Hector	UK	Propeller	Army co-operation/glider tug	1937	1942	Single-engined	piston biplane
Fairey	Hendon	UK	Propeller	Bomber	1936	1939	Twin-engined	piston monoplane
Hawker	Henley	UK	Propeller	Target tug	1939	1942	Single-engined	piston monoplane
Lockheed	C-130 Hercules	USA	Propeller	Transport	1967	2023	Four-engined	turboprop monoplane
Handley Page	Hereford	UK	Propeller	Bomber/trainer	1940	1940	Twin-engined	piston monoplane
de Havilland	Heron (Note: Used by Queen's flight)	UK	Propeller	Transport	1955	1972	Four-engined	piston monoplane
Handley Page	Heyford	UK	Propeller	Bomber/trainer	1933	1941	Twin-engined	piston biplane
Handley Page	Hinaidi	UK	Propeller	Bomber	1929	1937	Twin-engined	piston biplane
Hawker	Hind	UK	Propeller	Bomber/trainer	1935	1939	Single-engined	piston biplane
de Havilland	Hornet	UK	Propeller	Fighter	1945	1955	Twin-engined	piston monoplane
de Havilland	Hornet Moth	UK	Propeller	Communications	1938	1946	Single-engined	piston monoplane
Airspeed	Horsa	UK	Glider	Troop glider	1942	1945	Nil	Glider
Hawker	Horsley	UK	Propeller	Bomber/torpedo bomber	1927	1935	Single-engined	piston biplane
General Aircraft	Hotspur	UK	Glider	Trainer	1941	1945	Nil	Glider
Sikorsky	Hoverfly I	USA	Rotorcraft	Trainer	1945	1945	Single-engined	piston helicopter
Sikorsky	Hoverfly II	USA	Rotorcraft	Trainer	1946	1950	Single-engined	piston helicopter
Lockheed	Hudson	USA	Propeller	Maritime patrol/bomber/transport	1939	1945	Twin-engined	piston monoplane
de Havilland	Hummingbird	UK	Propeller	Trainer	1924	1927	Single-engined	piston monoplane
Hawker	Hunter	UK	Jet	Fighter/fighter-bomber/reconnaissance/trainer	1954	1994	Single-engined	jet monoplane
Hawker	Hurricane	UK	Propeller	Fighter/fighter-bomber/night fighter	1937	1947	Single-engined	piston monoplane
Beagle	Husky (Note: Single example donated to RAF)	UK	Propeller	Trainer	1969	1989	Single-engined	piston monoplane
Handley Page	Hyderabad	UK	Propeller	Bomber	1925	1933	Twin-engined	piston biplane
Beardmore	Inflexible	UK	Propeller	Bomber	1928	1930	Three-engined	piston monoplane
Blackburn	Iris	UK	Propeller	Maritime patrol	1930	1934	Three-engined	biplane flying boat
Britten-Norman	Islander CC.2 (Note: Sold in 2017.)	UK	Propeller	Surveillance	1992	2017	Twin-engined	turboprop monoplane
Britten-Norman	Islander R.1 (Note: AL1 transferred from the Army on 2 April 2019. In July 2021, reported were retired from service on 30 June 2021.)	UK	Propeller	Surveillance	2019	2021	Twin-engined	turboprop monoplane
SEPECAT	Jaguar	UK	Jet	Ground-attack/reconnaissance/trainer	1974	2007	Twin-engined	jet monoplane
Gloster	Javelin	UK	Jet	All-weather fighter/interceptor	1956	1968	Twin-engined	jet monoplane
Hunting Percival/ Hunting/ BAC	Jet Provost	UK	Jet	Trainer	1955	1993	Single-engined	jet monoplane
Handley Page; Scottish Aviation	Jetstream	UK	Propeller	Trainer	1973	2003	Twin-engined	turboprop monoplane
Blackburn	Kangaroo	UK	Propeller	Torpedo bomber	1918	1919	Twin-engined	piston biplane
Hawker Siddeley	Kestrel	UK	Jet	Fighter/ground-attack	1964	1965	Single-engined	jet VTOL monoplane
Beechcraft	King Air	USA	Propeller	Trainer	1972		Twin-engined	turboprop monoplane
Curtiss	Kittyhawk	USA	Propeller	Fighter/fighter-bomber	1942		Single-engined	piston monoplane
Short	Knuckleduster	UK	Propeller	Maritime patrol	1935	1935	Twin-engined	monoplane flying boat. Trials only
Avro	Lancaster	UK	Propeller	Heavy bomber/reconnaissance/maritime patrol	1942	1954	Four-engined	piston monoplane
Avro	Lancastrian	UK	Propeller	Transport	1945	1950	Four-engined	piston monoplane
Saunders-Roe	Lerwick	UK	Propeller	Maritime patrol	1939	1942	Twin-engined	monoplane flying boat
Consolidated	Liberator	USA	Propeller	Heavy bomber, transport, maritime patrol	1941	1947	Four-engined	piston monoplane
English Electric/ BAC	Lightning	UK	Jet	Fighter/interceptor	1959	1988	Twin-engined	jet monoplane
Lockheed	Lightning	USA	Propeller	Heavy fighter	1942	1943	Twin-engined	piston monoplane
Avro	Lincoln	UK	Propeller	Bomber	1945	1963	Four-engined	piston monoplane
Lockheed	Lodestar	USA	Propeller	Transport	1941		Twin-engined	piston monoplane
Saro	London	UK	Propeller	Maritime patrol	1936	1941	Twin-engined	biplane flying boat
Fairey	Long-range Monoplane	UK	Propeller	Experimental (Distance record)	1928	1933	Single-engined	piston monoplane
Westland	Lysander	UK	Propeller	Army co-operation/liaison	1938	1946	Single-engined	piston monoplane
Bristol	M.1C	UK	Propeller	Fighter	1918		Single-engined	piston monoplane
Miles	Magister	UK	Propeller	Trainer	1937	1944	Single-engined	piston monoplane
Avro	Manchester	UK	Propeller	Bomber	1940	1942	Twin-engined	piston monoplane
Handley Page	Marathon	UK	Propeller	Navigation trainer	1953	1958	Four-engined	piston monoplane
Martin	Marauder	USA	Propeller	Bomber	1942	1945	Twin-engined	piston monoplane
Martin	Mariner	USA	Propeller	Maritime patrol/transport	1943	1947	Twin-engined	monoplane flying boat
Miles	Martinet	UK	Propeller	Target tug	1942	1950	Single-engined	piston monoplane
Martin	Maryland	USA	Propeller	Bomber	1940	1943	Twin-engined	piston monoplane
Miles	Master	UK	Propeller	Trainer	1939	1945	Single-engined	piston monoplane
Miles	Mentor	UK	Propeller	Trainer/communications	1938		Single-engined	piston monoplane
AgustaWestland	Merlin	UK	Rotorcraft	Transport	2001	2016	Three-engined	turboshaft helicopter
Miles	Messenger	UK	Propeller	Liaison	1943	1948	Single-engined	piston monoplane
Gloster	Meteor	UK	Jet	Fighter/Reconnaissance	1944	1977	Twin-engined	jet monoplane
Armstrong Whitworth	Meteor	UK	Jet	Night fighter	1951	1961	Twin-engined	jet monoplane
North American	Mitchell	USA	Propeller	Bomber	1942	1950	Twin-engined	piston monoplane
Curtiss	Mohawk	USA	Propeller	Fighter	1940	1944	Single-engined	piston monoplane
de Havilland	Mosquito	UK	Propeller	Bomber/reconnaissance/fighter-bomber/ night fighter/target tug	1941	1956	Twin-engined	piston monoplane
North American	Mustang	USA	Propeller	Fighter/fighter-bomber	1942	1946	Single-engined	piston monoplane
Lockheed	Neptune	USA	Propeller	Maritime patrol/AEW	1952	1957	Twin-engined	piston monoplane
Nieuport; Gloster	Nighthawk	UK	Propeller	Fighter	1920	1923	Single-engined	piston biplane
Miles	Nighthawk	UK	Propeller	Trainer	1938	1940	Single-engined	piston monoplane
Nieuport	Nightjar	UK	Propeller	Fighter	1922	1924	Single-engined	piston biplane
Hawker Siddeley; BAE	Nimrod	UK	Jet	Maritime patrol/airborne early warning	1969	2011	Four-engined	jet monoplane
Northop	Nomad	USA	Propeller	Bomber/trainer	1940	1940	Single-engined	piston monoplane
Northrop	N-3PB	USA	Propeller	Maritime patrol	1941	1943	Single-engined	monoplane floatplane
Norman	N.T.2B	UK	Propeller	Trainer	1918		Single-engined	pusher flying boat biplane
Handley Page	O/400	UK	Propeller	Bomber	1918	1920	Twin-engined	piston biplane
de Havilland Canada	Otter	Canada	Propeller	Light Transport STOL bush plane	1954		Single-engined	piston monoplane
Boulton Paul	Overstrand	UK	Propeller	Medium bomber/gunnery trainer	1934	1941	Twin-engined	piston biplane
Airspeed	Oxford	UK	Propeller	Trainer	1937	1956	Twin-engined	piston monoplane
Parnall	Panther	UK	Propeller	Reconnaissance	1919	1926	Single-engined	piston biplane
Hunting Percival	Pembroke	UK	Propeller	Reconnaissance	1953	1988	Twin-engined	piston monoplane
Blackburn	Perth	UK	Propeller	Maritime patrol	1934	1938	Three-engined	biplane flying boat
Percival	Petrel	UK	Propeller	Communications	1938	1947	Twin-engined	piston monoplane
McDonnell Douglas	Phantom	USA	Jet	Fighter/ground attack/reconnaissance	1969	1992	Twin-engined	jet monoplane
Scottish Aviation	Pioneer	UK	Propeller	Transport	1953	1969	Single-engined	piston monoplane
Avro	Prefect	UK	Propeller	Trainer	1935		Single-engined	piston biplane
Percival	Prentice	UK	Propeller	Trainer/communications	1947	1953	Single-engined	piston monoplane
Percival	Proctor	UK	Propeller	Trainer/communications	1939	1955	Single-engined	piston monoplane
Hunting Percival	Provost	UK	Propeller	Trainer	1953	1969	Single-engined	piston monoplane
Westland/ Aérospatiale/ Airbus Helicopters	Puma	UK	Rotorcraft	Transport	1971	2025	Twin-engined	turboshaft helicopter
Sopwith	Pup	UK	Propeller	Fighter	1918		Single-engined	piston biplane
de Havilland	Puss Moth	UK	Propeller	Communications	1930	1943	Single-engined	piston monoplane
de Havilland	Queen Bee	UK	Propeller	Pilotless target drone			Single-engined	piston biplane
Airspeed	Queen Wasp	UK	Propeller	Pilotless target piston drone	1940		Single-engined	piston biplane
Short	Rangoon	UK	Propeller	Maritime patrol	1931	1939	Three-engined	biplane flying boat
Royal Aircraft Factory	R.E.8	UK	Propeller	Artillery spotting and reconnaissance	1918	1920	Single-engined	piston biplane
Vultee	Reliant	USA	Propeller	Trainer/communications			Single-engined	piston monoplane
Boeing	Rivet Joint/ Airseeker	USA	Jet	SIGINT	2013	In service	Four-engined	jet monoplane
Blackburn	Roc	UK	Propeller	Carrier fighter, target tug,	1939	1943	Single-engined	piston monoplane
Avro	Rota	UK	Rotorcraft	Army co-operation	1934	1945	Single-engined	piston autogyro
Canadair	Sabre	Canada	Jet	Fighter	1953	1956	Single-engined	jet monoplane
Sopwith	Salamander	UK	Propeller	Ground attack	1918	1922	Single-engined	piston biplane
Supermarine	Scapa	UK	Propeller	General Reconnaissance	1935	1938	Twin-engined	biplane flying boat
Nieuport	Scout	France	Propeller	Fighter	1918		Single-engined	piston biplane
Royal Aircraft Factory	S.E.5A	UK	Propeller	Fighter	1918		Single-engined	piston biplane
Short	Seaford	UK	Propeller	Maritime patrol	1946	1948	Four-engined	monoplane flying boat
Fairey	Seafox	UK	Propeller	Ship-borne reconnaissance seaplane	1937	1939	Single-engined	biplane floatplane
Westland	Sea King	UK	Rotorcraft	Air-sea rescue	1977	2015	Twin-engined	turboshaft helicopter
Fairey	Seal	UK	Propeller	Fleet spotter	1933	1943	Single-engined	piston biplane
Supermarine	Sea Otter	UK	Propeller	Air-sea rescue/fleet spotting/communications	1943	1949	Single-engined	amphibious biplane
Raytheon	Sentinel	Canada	Jet	Battlefield Surveillance	2008	2021	Twin-engined	jet monoplane
Stinson	Sentinel	USA	Propeller	Liaison	1943	1946	Single-engined	piston monoplane
Boeing	Sentry	USA	Jet	Airborne early warning	1990	2021	Four-engined	jet monoplane
Avro	Shackleton	UK	Propeller	Maritime patrol/AEW/trainer	1951	1991	Four-engined	piston monoplane
Beechcraft	Shadow R1	USA	Propeller	Battlefield Surveillance	2009	In service	Twin-engined	turboprop monoplane
Blackburn	Shark	UK	Propeller	Torpedo bomber	1936	1942	Single-engined	piston biplane
Boulton Paul	Sidestrand	UK	Propeller	Bomber	1928	1934	Twin-engined	piston biplane
Short	Singapore	UK	Propeller	Maritime patrol	1935	1941	Four-engined	biplane flying boat
Armstrong Whitworth	Siskin	UK	Propeller	Fighter/trainer	1924	1932	Single-engined	piston biplane
Bell/Westland	Sioux	UK	Rotorcraft	Trainer	1967		Single-engined	piston helicopter
Saunders-Roe	Skeeter	UK	Rotorcraft	Trainer	1958	1964	Single-engined	piston helicopter
Blackburn	Skua	UK	Propeller	Fighter/dive-bomber	1938	1945	Single-engined	piston monoplane
Douglas	Skymaster	USA	Propeller	Transport	1944	1946	Four-engined	piston monoplane
Sopwith	Snipe	UK	Propeller	Fighter	1918	1926	Single-engined	piston biplane
Supermarine	Southampton	UK	Propeller	Reconnaissance	1925	1937	Twin-engined	biplane flying boat
SPAD	S.XIII	France	Propeller	Fighter	1918		Single-engined	piston biplane
Supermarine	Spitfire	UK	Propeller	Fighter, photo Reconnaissance	1938	1954	Single-engined	piston monoplane
Supermarine	Spiteful	UK	Propeller	Fighter			Single-engined	piston monoplane
Eurocopter	Squirrel	France	Rotorcraft	Trainer	1997		Single-engined	turboshaft helicopter
Short	Stirling	UK	Propeller	Bomber/transport	1940	1946	Four-engined	piston monoplane
Supermarine	Stranraer	UK	Propeller	Maritime patrol	1936	1940	Twin-engined	biplane flying boat
Short	Sunderland	UK	Propeller	Maritime patrol/transport	1938	1959	Four-engined	monoplane flying boat
Supermarine	Swift	UK	Jet	Fighter/Reconnaissance	1954	1961	Single-engined	jet monoplane
Fairey	Swordfish	UK	Propeller	Torpedo-bomber/Reconnaissance	1936	1945	Single-engined	piston biplane
Bristol	Sycamore	UK	Rotorcraft	Communications/ambulance/search and rescue	1952	1971	Single-engined	piston helicopter
Hawker	Tempest	UK	Propeller	Fighter/target tug	1944	1951	Single-engined	piston monoplane
Republic	Thunderbolt	USA	Propeller	Fighter/fighter-bomber	1944	1945	Single-engined	piston monoplane
de Havilland	Tiger Moth	UK	Propeller	Trainer	1932	1951	Single-engined	piston biplane
Curtiss	Tomahawk	USA	Propeller	Fighter/fighter-bomber	1940	1944	Single-engined	piston monoplane
Hawker	Tomtit	UK	Propeller	Trainer	1929	1935	Single-engined	piston biplane
Panavia	Tornado	UK	Jet	Fighter/bomber	1979	2019	Twin-engined	jet monoplane
Beech	Traveller	USA	Propeller	Transport			Single-engined	piston biplane
Lockheed	TriStar	USA	Jet	Transport/tanker	1984	2013	Three-engined	jet monoplane
Short	Tucano	UK	Propeller	Trainer	1988	2019	Single-engined	turboprop monoplane
Avro	Tutor	UK	Propeller	Trainer	1930	1937	Single-engined	piston biplane
Grob	Tutor	Germany	Propeller	Trainer	1998	In service	Single-engined	piston monoplane
Scottish Aviation	Twin Pioneer	UK	Propeller	Transport	1958	1969	Twin-engined	piston monoplane
Eurocopter	Twin Squirrel	France	Rotorcraft	Transport/communications			Twin-engined	turboshaft helicopter
Hawker	Typhoon	UK	Propeller	Fighter/fighter-bomber	1941	1945	Single-engined	piston monoplane
Eurofighter	Typhoon	UK	Jet	Fighter-bomber	2007	In service	Twin-engined	jet monoplane
Handley Page	V/1500	UK	Propeller	Bomber	1918	1920	Four-engined	piston biplane
Vickers	Valentia	UK	Propeller	Bomber/transport	1934	1944	Twin-engined	piston biplane
Vickers	Valetta	UK	Propeller	Transport/trainer	1948	1969	Twin-engined	piston monoplane
Vickers	Valiant	UK	Jet	Bomber/tanker	1955	1965	Four-engined	jet monoplane
de Havilland	Vampire	UK	Jet	Fighter/night fighter/trainer	1946	1972	Single-engined	jet monoplane
Vickers	Varsity	UK	Propeller	Trainer	1951	1976	Twin-engined	piston monoplane
Vickers/ BAC	VC10	UK	Jet	Transport/tanker	1966	2013	Four-engined	jet monoplane
Percival	Vega Gull	UK	Propeller	Communications	1938		Single-engined	piston monoplane
Vultee	Vengeance	UK	Propeller	Dive bomber/target tug	1942	1948	Single-engined	piston monoplane
de Havilland	Venom	UK	Jet	Fighter-bomber/night fighter	1952	1962	Single-engined	jet monoplane
Lockheed	Ventura	USA	Propeller	Medium bomber/maritime patrol	1942	1946	Twin-engined	piston monoplane
Vickers	Vernon	UK	Propeller	Transport	1922	1927	Twin-engined	piston biplane
Handley Page	Victor	UK	Jet	Strategic bomber/tanker/Reconnaissance	1957	1993	Four-engined	jet monoplane
Vickers	Victoria	UK	Propeller	Transport	1926	1935	Twin-engined	piston biplane
Vultee; Stinson	Vigiliant	USA	Propeller	Army co-operation	1941		Single-engined	piston monoplane
Vickers	Viking (Note: Used by Queen's flight)	UK	Propeller	Transport	1946	1959	Twin-engined	piston monoplane
Vickers	Vildebeest	UK	Propeller	Torpedo bomber	1933	1942	Single-engined	piston biplane
Vickers	Vimy	UK	Propeller	Bomber	1918	1931	Twin-engined	piston biplane
Vickers	Vincent	UK	Propeller	Army co-operation	1934	1941	Single-engined	piston biplane
Vickers	Virginia	UK	Propeller	Heavy bomber/parachute training	1924	1937	Twin-engined	piston biplane
Airbus	Voyager	Spain	Jet	Tanker/Transport	2012	In service	Twin-engined	jet monoplane
Avro; Hawker Siddeley	Vulcan	UK	Jet	Strategic bomber/tanker/Reconnaissance	1957	1984	Four-engined	jet monoplane
Westland	Wallace	UK	Propeller	Utility	1933	1943	Single-engined	piston biplane
Westland	Walrus	UK	Propeller	Fleet Reconnaissance	1921	1925	Single-engined	piston biplane
Supermarine	Walrus	UK	Propeller	Air-sea rescue, fleet spotting and communications	1936	1946	Single-engined	pusher amphibian biplane
Westland	Wapiti	UK	Propeller	General purpose/bomber/trainer	1928	1940	Single-engined	piston biplane
Vickers	Warwick	UK	Propeller	Bomber/maritime patrol/transport	1943	1946	Twin-engined	piston monoplane
Boeing	Washington	USA	Propeller	Bomber	1950	1958	Four-engined	piston monoplane
Westland	Welkin	UK	Propeller	High altitude fighter	1944	1944	Twin-engined	piston monoplane
Vickers	Wellesley	UK	Propeller	Bomber	1937	1942	Single-engined	piston monoplane
Vickers	Wellington	UK	Propeller	Medium bomber/Maritime patrol/transport/trainer/AEW	1938	1953	Twin-engined	piston monoplane
Westland	Wessex	UK	Rotorcraft	Transport/air-sea rescue	1964	1985	Twin-engined	turboshaft helicopter
Westland	Whirlwind	UK	Propeller	Fighter	1940	1943	Twin-engined	piston monoplane
Westland	Whirlwind	UK	Rotorcraft	Air-sea rescue/transport	1955	1977	Single-engined	piston helicopter
Armstrong Whitworth	Whitley	UK	Propeller	Medium bomber/maritime patrol/transport/trainer	1937	1945	Twin-engined	piston monoplane
Embraer	Phenom T.1	Brazil	Jet	Trainer	2016	In service	Twin-engined	jet monoplane
Hawker	Woodcock	UK	Propeller	Night fighter	1924	1928	Single-engined	piston biplane
Avro	York	UK	Propeller	Transport	1943	1957	Four-engined	piston monoplane
Dassault	Falcon 900LX Envoy CC.1	France	Jet	Transport	2022	In service	Three-engined	jet monoplane

== Aircraft impressed into RAF service ==
=== Civil aircraft ===
Civil aircraft
Aircraft type	Number impressed	Unit(s)/location/purpose
Aeronca 50 Chief	1	India
Airspeed AS 5 Courier	9	
Airspeed AS 6 Envoy	2	
Airspeed Ferry	2	One used by RAF Halton in 1940, then both used as instructional airframes.
Armstrong Whitworth Atalanta	5	31 Squadron in India and Iraq, ex-Imperial Airways/BOAC
Armstrong Whitworth Ensign	2	24 Squadron, ex-Imperial Airways/BOAC
Avro 504N	7	glider tug
Avro 642 Eighteen	1	
Avro 652	2	navigation training
Avro Cadet	32	No. 3 Elementary Flying Training School (EFTS) at RAF Hamble and RAF Watchfield
Avro Commodore	1	RAF Cranfield Communications Flight
Avro 619 Five	1	No. 11 Air Observer Navigation School (AONS) at RAF Hamble
Beech 17 Traveller	4	
Bellanca Pacemaker	1	
British Aircraft Double Eagle	2	
British Aircraft Eagle	4	
British Aircraft Swallow	9	some converted into gliders
British Aircraft Company Drone	1	608 Squadron
Blackburn B-2	31	No. 4 Elementary Flying Training School (EFTS) at Brough
Boeing 247D	1	Telecommunications Research Establishment, ex-RCAF
Cessna C-34 Airmaster	1	Used a few weeks in 1941 by RAF Hucknall, sold in 1942.
Cierva C.30A	5	529 Squadron
Cierva C.40 Rota Mk II	2	
Comper Swift	2	1 used by 25 Squadron and second by 247 Squadron
Curtiss T-32 Condor II	4	
De Havilland DH.86B	2	24 Squadron
De Havilland Albatross	2	271 Squadron, ex-Imperial Airways/BOAC
De Havilland Dragon	17	
De Havilland Dragon Rapide	40	
De Havilland Dragonfly	15	
De Havilland Flamingo	3	24 Squadron, ex-BOAC
De Havilland Fox Moth	2	
De Havilland Gipsy Moth	37	
De Havilland Hornet Moth	64	25 used for coastal patrol
De Havilland Moth Minor	26	glider tug
De Havilland Leopard Moth	45	communications
De Havilland Moth Major	unk.	
De Havilland Puss Moth	47	communications
De Havilland Tiger Moth	160 +	training
Desoutter Mk.II	4	
Douglas DC-2	19	No. 31 Squadron RAF in India, Iraq and Burma, 1941 - 1943
Douglas DC-3	10	31 Squadron and 24 Squadron (2 ex-SABENA).
Fairchild 24	2	RAF Halton Communications Flight
Fairchild 91	1	air-sea rescue in the Middle East
Focke-Wulf Fw 200 Condor	1	Danish Air Lines War prize seized after Germany invaded Denmark. Flown by BOAC but rarely used due to restrictions on flying German aircraft. Crashed on delivery to Air Transport Auxiliary and dismantled.
Fokker F.XXII	2	ex-KLM. No. 1 Air Observer Navigation School (AONS) at Prestwick
Fokker F.XXXVI	1	ex-KLM, No. 1 Air Observer Navigation School (AONS) at Prestwick
Ford Trimotor	1	271 Squadron, ex-Guinness family private aircraft
Foster Wikner Warferry	3	24 Squadron, Communications Flights RAF Cranwell and RAF Northolt
General Aircraft Cagnet	1	School of Army Co-operation
General Aircraft Cygnet	5	Nos. 23, 24, 85, 88 and 510 Squadrons
General Aircraft Owlet	1	23 Squadron
General Aircraft Monospar (ST-6, 10 & 12)	4	Nos 7 and 8 Anti-Aircraft Co-operation Units (AACU)
General Aircraft Monospar ST-25	13	
General Aircraft Owlet	1	Nos. 23 and 605 Squadrons.
Grumman Goose	2	Operated by 24 Squadron and ATA in 1943
Grumman Widgeon	1	West Africa
Handley Page HP.42	3	271 Squadron, ex-Imperial Airways/BOAC
Harlow PC-5A	5	India
Heston Phoenix	3	24 Squadron
Koolhoven F.K.43	1	Dutch private aircraft
Lockheed Model 10 Electra	4	24 Squadron
Lockheed Model 12 Electra Junior	2	24 Squadron
Messerschmitt Aldon	3	Station Flights at RAF Abingdon, RAF Andover and RAF Northolt
Miles Falcon	6	Station Flights at RAF Heston, RAF Northolt and RAF Sealand
Miles Hawk Major	11	
Miles Hawk Trainer	11	No. 8 Elementary Flying Training School (EFTS).
Miles Mohawk	1	RAF Andover
Miles Monarch	5	Abingdon and Halton Communications Flights
Miles Whitney Straight	21	
Parnall Heck	3	1 at Communications Flight RAF Turnhouse and 1 at 24 Squadron
Percival Gull	1	
Percival Q.6 Petrel	9	
Percival Vega Gull	20	
Piper J-4 Cub Coupe	19	
Saro Cutty Sark	2	No. 3 Elementary and Reserve Flying Training School (ERFTS)
Savoia-Marchetti S.73	7	Nos. 24 and 271 Squadrons, ex-SABENA
Short Empire	4	Maritime patrol with Nos. 119 and 413 squadrons, ex-Imperial Airways/BOAC
Short G-class	3	Maritime patrol with 119 Squadron
Short Mercury	1	320 Squadron
Short Scion	11	
Short Scion Senior	1	173 Squadron
Spartan Cruiser	3	No. 6 and 7 Anti-Aircraft Co-operation Units (AACU)
Spartan Executive	1	No. 1 Photographic Reconnaissance Unit RAF
Stampe SV.4B	1	510 Squadron
Stinson Reliant	11	
Stinson Voyager	2	
Taylorcraft Auster Plus C and Plus D	23	
Tipsy B/Trainer	6	No. 18 (Pilots) Advanced Flying Unit RAF
Westland Wessex	1	
Zlin 212	1	Used by the RAF in India

=== Military aircraft ===
Title
Type	Original operator	Number	Period	Unit(s)	Purpose
Bloch MB.81	L'Armee de l'Air	1	1940	No.2 Free French Flight	Communications
Bücker Bü 181	Luftwaffe	70 ~	1945-1946	Various	Communications
Caudron Simoun	L'Armee de l'Air	2	1940-	1 with 267 Squadron	Communications
Caproni Ca.148	Regia Aeronautica	1	1941	Khartoum Communications Flight & 117 Squadron	Transport
Dewoitine D.520	L'Armee de l'Air	3	1940-	Free French Flight	Fighter
Dornier Do 17Ka	Royal Yugoslav Air Force	2	1941	Egypt	Bomber/transport
Dornier Do 22Kj	Royal Yugoslav Navy	8	1941-1942	230 Squadron	Anti-submarine patrol
Fieseler Fi 156	Luftwaffe	50 ~	1939-1946	Various	Communications/reconnaissance
Focke-Wulf Fw 58	Luftwaffe	9 ~	1945-1946	Various	Communications
Fokker T.VIIIW	Marineluchtvaartdienst	5	1940-1940	320 Squadron	Convoy patrol
Heinkel He 115A-2	Marinens Flyvevsen	4	1940-1943	Royal Norwegian Navy flight	Clandestine operations
Junkers Ju 52/3m	Luftwaffe	70 ~	1945-1946	Various	Transport
Loire 130		1	1940-1941	No. 2 Free French Flight	Communications
Morane-Saulnier M.S.406	L'Armee de l'Air	3	1940-1942	No. 2 Free French Flight	Fighter
Potez 29	L'Armee de l'Air	2	1940-?	No. 2 Free French Flight	communications
Potez 63-11	L'Armee de l'Air	4	1940-1942	No. 2 Free French Flight	Communications
Rogožarski SIM-XIV-H	Royal Yugoslav Navy	1	1941-1942	230 Squadron	Reconnaissance
Savoia-Marchetti SM.79K	Royal Yugoslav Air Force	4	1941-1943	1 with No.2 Photographic Reconnaissance Unit, 3 with 117 Sqdn, 1 with 173 Sqdn	Transport
Savoia-Marchetti SM.82	Regia Aeronautica	2	1945-1946		Transport
Siebel Si 204	Luftwaffe	65 ~	1945-1946	Various	Communications

== Captured or interned ==
Captured or interned examples of the following aircraft were at one time flown by either the RAF or more normally by the Royal Aircraft Establishment for evaluation.

=== Argentine aircraft ===
- FMA IA 58 Pucará, 11 aircraft were captured during the Falklands War. Six were taken back to the United Kingdom. Four are on display - one at the North East Land, Sea and Air Museums, one at the Norfolk and Suffolk Aviation Museum, one at Imperial War Museum Duxford and one at the South Yorkshire Aircraft Museum.

=== German aircraft ===
- Arado Ar 96, Ar 196, Ar 232, Ar 234
- Blohm & Voss BV 138, BV 155, BV 222
- Braunschweig LF-1 Zaunkönig
- Bücker Bü 131, Bü 180, Bü 181
- Dornier Do 17, Do 24, Do 217, Do 335
- DFS 228
- Fieseler Fi 103, Fi 156, Fl 282
- Focke-Achgelis Fa 223, Fa 330
- Focke-Wulf Fw 58, Fw 189, Fw 190, Ta 152, Fw 200
- Fokker D.VII
- Gotha Go 145, Go 150
- Halberstadt D.III
- Heinkel He 59, He 111, He 115, He 162, He 177, He 219
- Henschel Hs 129, Hs 130
- Horten Ho IV, Ho 229
- Junkers Ju 52/3m, Ju 87, Ju 88, Ju 188, Ju 290, Ju 352, Ju 388, W 34
- Klemm Kl 35
- Messerschmitt Bf 108, Bf 109, Bf 110, Me 163, Me 262, Me 323, Me 410
- Siebel Fh 104, Si 204

=== Italian aircraft ===
- Caproni Ca.100, Ca.101, Ca.148, Ca 309, Ca.311
- Caproni-Campini CC.2
- Cant Z.501, Z.506
- Fiat CR.42, G.12, G.50, G.55
- Macchi MC.200, MC.202
- Saiman 200, 202
- Savoia-Marchetti SM.73, SM.79, SM.81, SM.82, SM.95

=== Japanese aircraft ===
- Kawasaki Ki-48, Ki-61, Ki-100
- Kawanishi H6K
- Kyushu K9W
- Mitsubishi A6M, G4M, J2M, Ki-21, Ki-46, Ki-67
- Nakajima A6M2-N, L2D, Ki-43, Ki-44
- Yokosuka MXY8
- Tachikawa Ki-36, Ki-54, Ki-55

== Schneider Trophy seaplanes ==
Aircraft used by the Royal Air Force in support of its efforts in the Schneider Trophy races, and includes aircraft used solely as trainers.

- Fairey Flycatcher biplane floatplane
- Fairey Firefly IIM biplane floatplane
- Fairey Fleetwing biplane floatplane
- Gloster I 1925 & 1927 biplane floatplane
- Gloster III 1925 biplane floatplane
- Gloster IV 1926-1927 biplane floatplane
- Gloster VI Golden Arrow 1929 monoplane floatplane
- Short Crusader 1927 monoplane floatplane
- Supermarine S.5 1927 monoplane floatplane
- Supermarine S.6 1929 monoplane floatplane
- Supermarine S.6B 1931 monoplane floatplane

== Training gliders ==
The following Gliders are or were flown by RAF training squadrons:

- Slingsby Cadet TX.1 - Single-seat training glider
- Slingsby Cadet TX.2 - Single-seat training glider
- Slingsby Sedbergh TX.1 - Two-seat training glider
- Slingsby Prefect TX.1 - Single-seat training glider
- Slingsby Cadet TX.3 - Two-seat training glider
- Slingsby Grasshopper TX.1 - Primary Glider
- Slingsby T.45 Swallow - Single-seat Glider
- Slingsby T.53B
- Slingsby Venture T.2 - Two-seat self launching motor glider
- Elliotts Eton TX.1 - Primary glider
- Grob Viking TX.1 - German built training glider
- Grob Vigilant T.1 - German built self Launching motor glider (1991)
- Schempp-Hirth Janus C - German built training sailplane
- Schleicher Valiant TX.1 - German built sailplane
- Schleicher Vanguard TX.1 - German built training glider

== Airships and balloons ==
- List of British airships
- Barrage balloons

== UAVs and drones ==
- Airspeed Queen Wasp - target drone
- de Havilland Queen Bee - target drone
- Fairey Queen - target drone
- GAF Jindivik - Target drone
- General Atomics Reaper - ISTAR
- StormShroud
- Meggitt Banshee
- Miles Queen Martinet
- Target Technology Ltd Imp

== See also ==
- List of aircraft of the Royal Naval Air Service
- List of aircraft of the Fleet Air Arm
- List of aircraft of the Army Air Corps (United Kingdom)
