= No. 342 Squadron RAF =

No. 342 (GB I/20 'Lorraine') Squadron RAF
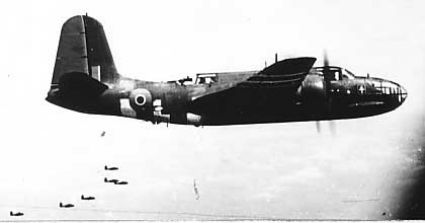
- Active: 7 April 1943 – 2 December 1945
- Country: United Kingdom
- Allegiance: Free French Forces
- Branch: Royal Air Force
- Part of: RAF Fighter Command
- Nickname(s): GB I/20 'Lorraine'
- Motto(s): Nous Y Sommes (We are here)

Insignia
- Squadron Badge heraldry: On a billet in bend indented to the base, three alérions
- Squadron code: OA (Apr 1943 – Dec 1945)

The No. 342 Squadron also known in French as ''Groupe de Bombardement n° 1/20 "Lorraine", was a Free French squadron in the RAF during World War II.

== History ==
No. 342 Squadron was formed on 7 April 1943 at RAF West Raynham with personnel from the Free French Air Forces (Forces aériennes françaises libres) transferred from the Middle East, in particular the personnel of the French escadrilles "Metz" and "Nancy". The squadron was part of No. 2 Group RAF of RAF Bomber Command and equipped with Douglas Mk IIIA Bostons (aka Douglas A-20C Havocs). They later moved with their sister squadron No. 88 Squadron to RAF Hartford Bridge.

While flying Bostons, the aircraft of the Squadron featured in the film The Way to the Stars.

The squadron flew low-level bombing and strafing missions (nicknamed "hedgehopping"), over France and the Netherlands, in particular against V-1 bases in Northern France and selected sites connected with the preparation for the Allied invasion.

In October 1944 the squadron relocated to France from where it continued to support the Allied advance. In March/April 1945 the Bostons were replaced by North American B-25 Mitchells and the squadron relocated to the Netherlands. The squadron was transferred from RAF control to the French Air Force ( Armée de l'Air ) on 2 December 1945.

Among those who served with the squadron as aircrew was the novelist (and post-war diplomat) Romain Gary.

== See also ==
- Free French Flight
- List of RAF squadrons
