= Auster AOP =

Auster AOP may refer to:

- Taylorcraft Auster - Taylorcraft Auster I, II, III, IV and V
- Auster AOP.6
- Auster AOP.9
