= List of aircraft and armaments of the Army Air Corps (United Kingdom) =

This is a list of aircraft and armaments of the Army Air Corps (British Army).

== Aircraft ==
=== From its founding in 1942; ===
==== Retired ====
- Airspeed Horsa.
- Auster AOP.6
- General Aircraft Hamilcar
- General Aircraft Hotspur
- Taylorcraft Auster
- Waco Hadrian
- Waco YKC and ZGC-7 – Two civil aircraft purchased by the British Army in Egypt and used by the Long Range Desert Group.

=== Helicopters ===
==== Active ====
- Boeing AH-64E Apache
- AgustaWestland AW159 Wildcat
- Eurocopter AS365 Dauphin – Used by Joint Special Forces Aviation Wing in support of UKSF
- Airbus H145 Jupiter HC.2

==== Retired ====
- Westland Gazelle
- Agusta A109
- Bristol Sycamore- Four helicopters.
- Eurocopter Squirrel
- Saunders-Roe Skeeter – First helicopter used by Army Air Corps
- Sud Aviation Alouette II
- Westland Lynx
- Westland Scout
- Westland Sioux
- Bell 212 – Used by 25 Flight AAC at British Army Training Unit Kenya
- Airbus H135 – was to replace the Gazelle in the surveillance role. However, the MoD decided that they were no longer required for their procured purpose.
- AgustaWestland Apache AH1

=== Fixed wing ===
==== Active ====
- Grob Tutor T1 (at 674 Squadron, DEFTS and Army Flying Grading)

==== Retired ====
- Auster AOP.9
- Britten-Norman Islander/Defender
- de Havilland Canada Beaver
- de Havilland Canada Chipmunk
- Slingsby Firefly T-67M260 (at 674 Squadron, DEFTS)
- Slingsby Firefly 160 (at Army Flying Grading)

=== Minor aircraft ===
- Auster A.2/45 - Air Observation post aircraft. Two prototype aircraft
- Heston JC.6 - Air observation Post aircraft. Two prototype aircraft
- Edgar Percival E.P.9 - Light utility aircraft. Two prototype aircraft were bought by the British Army in 1958.

== Weapons and munitions ==
=== Missiles ===
==== Active ====
- AGM-114 Hellfire – Air-to-surface, laser-guided anti-tank missile. Carried by the Boeing AH-64E Apache
- AGM-179 Joint Air-to-Ground Missile (JAGM) – Carried by the Boeing AH-64E Apache

==== Retired ====
- BGM-71 TOW – Air-to-surface, anti-tank guided missile. Carried by the Westland Lynx.
- AS.11 – MCLS wire-guided air-to-surface anti-tank missile. Carried by the Westland Scout

=== Unguided rockets ===
==== Active ====
- 70-mm (2.75-inch) Hydra 70 air-to-surface rockets

==== Retired ====
- 68-mm (2.7-inch) SNEB air-to-surface rockets
- 70-mm (2.75-inch) CRV7 air-to-surface rockets

=== Cannons ===
- 30-mm M230 Chain Gun

=== Machine guns ===
- 7.62-mm (0.300-inch) FN MAG L112A1 general purpose machine gun
- 12.7-mm (0.50-inch) M3M Browning heavy machine gun

== See also ==
- List of aircraft of the Royal Air Force
- List of aircraft of the Fleet Air Arm
