= Pierre Clostermann =

World War II French ace fighter pilot, writer, diplomat, engineer and politician

Pierre-Henri Clostermann
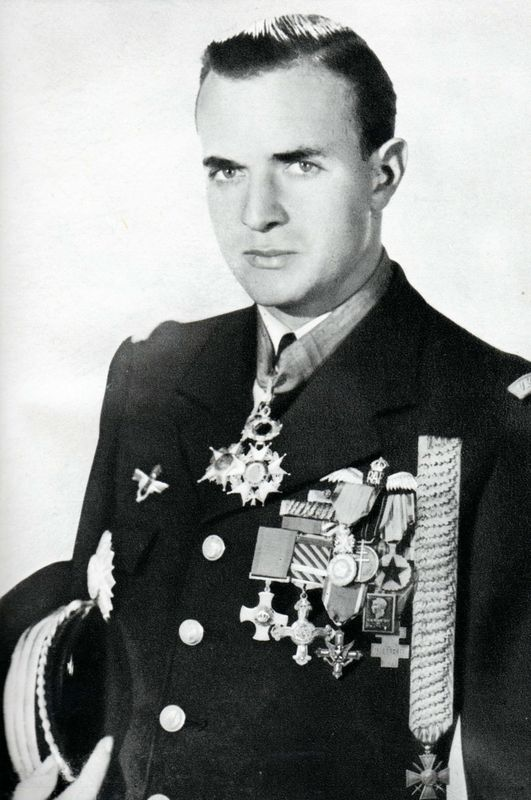
- Pierre Clostermann, c. 1945.
- Born: 28 February 1921; Curitiba, Brazil
- Died: 22 March 2006 (aged 85); Montesquieu-des-Albères, France
- Military career
- Allegiance: United Kingdom; France
- Branch: Royal Air Force; French Air and Space Force
- Service years: 1942–1945, 1956–1957
- Rank: Wing Commander (RAF); Lieutenant (France)
- Units: No. 341 Squadron RAF; No. 602 Squadron RAF; No. 274 Squadron RAF; No. 56 Squadron RAF; No. 3 Squadron RAF
- Conflicts: World War Two; Algerian War
- Awards: See List
- Other work: Author, engineer and politician.
- Website: pierre.clostermann.org

Pierre-Henri Clostermann DSO, DFC & Bar (28 February 1921 – 22 March 2006) was a World War II French ace fighter pilot.

During the conflict he has been claimed to have achieved 33 air-to-air combat victories, earning the accolade "France's First Fighter" from General Charles de Gaulle. His wartime memoir, The Big Show (Le Grand Cirque) became a notable bestseller, selling over three millions of copies. William Faulkner commented that this is the finest aviation book to come out of World War II. After the war, he worked as an engineer and was elected the youngest Member of France's Parliament.

== Early life between Brazil, France and the USA ==
Clostermann was born and raised in Curitiba, Brazil, into a French diplomatic family. He was the only son of Madeleine Carlier from Lorraine and Jacques Clostermann from Alsace. He was perfectly fluent in Portuguese. There, he met French superstars of the time Jean Mermoz and Henri Guillaumet, then Aéropostale pilots. In 1935, he received his first flight on the seaplane Latécoère 521 "Lieutenant de Vaisseau Paris" on the Lac de Biscarrosse in South West France. In 1937, at the age of sixteen, he learned to fly at the Brazilian flying club in Manguinhos on Bücker Bü 131 Jungmann and Bü 133 Jungmeister with German pilot Karl Benitz (died in 1943, Russia). After receiving flying tuition, he completed his secondary education in France and gained his private pilot's licence in 1937. In 1937, he studied at the Franco-Brazilian high school Molière, in Rio de Janeiro. At the same time, he began writing columns for the newspaper Correio da Manhã. From 1938 to 1940, he took aeronautical engineering courses at the Ryan School of Aeronautics in San Diego, in the United States of America. In 1940, he obtained his aeronautical engineering diploma and his professional pilot's license. He then joined England, via Brazil, Uruguay and South Africa, to join the Free French Air Force. He already had 315 flight hours under his belt.

== World War II ==
On the outbreak of war in 1939 the French authorities refused his application for service, so he travelled to Los Angeles to become a commercial pilot, studying at the California Institute of Technology. Clostermann joined the Free French Air Force in the United Kingdom in March 1942. After training at RAF Cranwell and 61 OTU, Clostermann, a sergeant pilot, was posted in January 1943 to No. 341 Squadron RAF (known to the Free French as Groupe de Chasse n° 3/2 "Alsace"), flying the Supermarine Spitfire.

On 15 July 1943 he crash-landed after combat when unable to lower his undercarriage (Cat.B). He scored his first two victories on 27 July 1943, also as Yellow 2, claiming destruction of two Focke-Wulf Fw 190s over France. In October 1943, Clostermann received a commission as an officer, and was assigned to the British No. 602 Squadron RAF, remaining with the unit for the next ten months. He flew a variety of operations including fighter sweeps, bomber escorts, high-altitude interdiction over the Royal Navy's Scapa Flow base, and strafing or dive-bombing attacks on V-1 launch sites on the French coast. He flew air-cover for the Normandy Landings, and, on 11 June, was one of the first Free French pilots to land on French soil, at temporary airstrip B-2 near Bazenville, before moving to B-11, near Longues-sur-Mer, Normandy on 18 June 1944. He was awarded the Distinguished Flying Cross shortly afterwards, after which he was reassigned to French Air Force Headquarters.

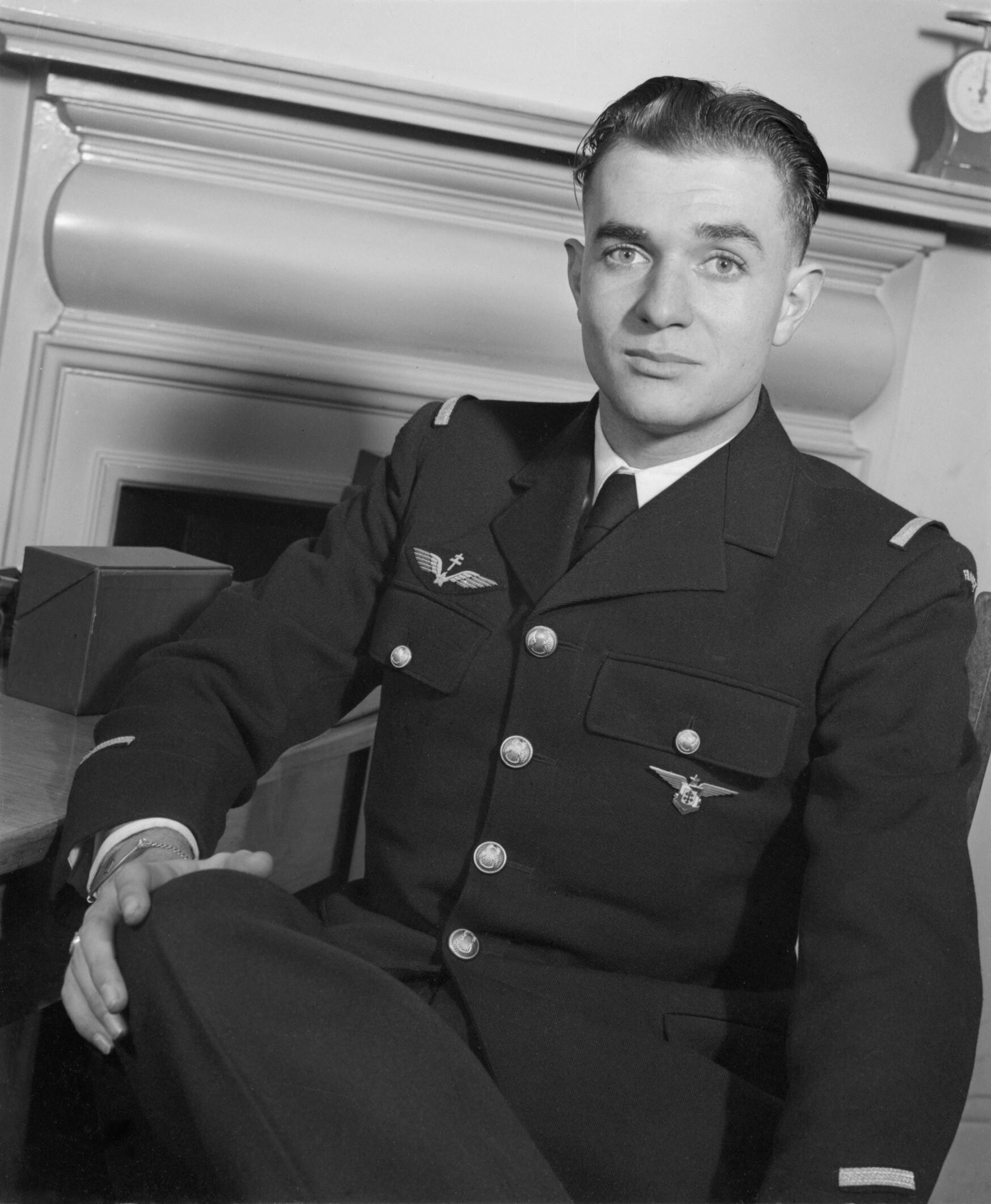
Clostermann whilst serving with No. 341 Squadron RAF "Alsace"

In December 1944 he returned to the front line on re-secondment to the Royal Air Force as a supernumerary flight lieutenant. He joined No. 274 Squadron RAF flying the new Hawker Tempest Mk V. In an aircraft which he named Le Grand Charles (named after both the "Vieux Charles", the aircraft of 53-kill French WWI ace Georges Guynemer, and the Free French leader Charles de Gaulle, who was known for his height), Clostermann flew an intensive and highly successful round of fighter sweeps, airfield attacks, "rat scramble" interceptions of Messerschmitt Me 262 jet fighters, and rail interdiction missions over northern Germany over the next two months.

In March 1945 he briefly served with No. 56 Squadron, before transfer to No. 3 Squadron. On 24 March 1945 he was wounded in the leg by German flak, and after belly-landing his badly damaged aircraft was hospitalised for a week. From 8 April 1945 he was commander of "A" Flight, No. 3 Squadron RAF. He was awarded a bar to his DFC. He was later appointed Wing Commander (flying) of 122 Wing, the most prestigious wing in the R.A.F., at the age of 24.

On 12 May 1945 during a victory fly-past to mark the war's conclusion, another Tempest collided with his, and as a result an air pile-up occurred with four close formation low-flying aeroplanes of his flight involved, with three pilots being killed. Clostermann bailed out, his parachute opening just a few metres above the ground. He continued operations with No. 122 Wing RAF until he left the military altogether on 27 July 1945 with the RAF rank of wing commander and the French rank of lieutenant.

In his 432 sorties, Clostermann has been credited with 33 victories (19 solo, 14 shared, most of them against fighters), a predominant source being his own book The Big Show, and five "probables", with eight more "damaged". He also claimed 225 motor vehicles destroyed, 72 locomotives, five tanks, and two E-boats (fast torpedo boats). Many references credit him with 29 to 33 victories, although these probably include his "ground" kills of enemy aircraft. Recent, more detailed analysis of his combat reports and squadron accounts indicate that his actual score was 11 destroyed, with possibly another seven, for a total of 15–18 victories.

== Later life ==
=== The Big Show ===
In 1948, Clostermann authored an account of his wartime experiences entitled Le Grand Cirque (published in English as The Big Show). One of the first post-war fighter pilot memoirs, its various editions have sold over three million copies. William Faulkner commented that this is the finest aviation book to come out of World War II. The book was reprinted, in expanded form, in both paperback and hardcover editions in 2004. It was also adapted in comic book form by Manuel Perales, in close collaboration with Clostermann.

The Big Show has been translated in English, Japanese, German, Italian, Spanish, Finnish, Norwegian, Polish, Portuguese, Romanian, Serbian and Slovenian.

A movie based on the book was made in 1949 and released the following year.

=== Flames in the Sky ===
Clostermann also wrote Feux du Ciel (translated in English under the title of Flames in the Sky) published in 1951, a collection of heroic air combat exploits from both Allied and Axis sides.

Feux du Ciel was first published in 1951 by Flammarion in Paris, running to 271 pages with 31 illustrations. A later French edition was issued in 2001 by Ananké-Lefrancq in Brussels. The following year, the book reached English readers as Flames in the Sky, translated by Oliver Berthoud, with editions published in 1957 and 1958 by Penguin Books, in 1952, 1953, 1954, 1955, 1956, 1960 and 1969 by Chatto & Windus in London, another one in 1966 by Corgi Books. The latest edition is a modern reissue by Silvertail Books in 2021.

A Spanish edition appeared under the title Fuego del cielo: Episodios de guerra.

It was also translated in Japanese, Finnish and multiple times in German.

=== Engineer ===
After the war, Clostermann continued his career as an engineer, participating in the creation of Reims Aviation, supporting the Max Holste Broussard prototype, acting as a representative for Cessna, and working for Renault.

=== Elected youngest Member of Parliament ===
He served eight terms as a député (member of parliament) in the French National Assembly between 1946 and 1969. As a deputy for Marne he resigned from the Gaullist group in 1955 over their treatment of the Resident-General in French Morocco during the negotiations with nationalist movement.

=== Algerian War of Independance ===
He also briefly re-enlisted in the Armée de l'Air in 1956–57 to fly ground-attack missions during the Algerian War. He subsequently published a novel based on his experiences there, entitled Appui-feu sur l'Oued Hallaïl or 'Fire Support Over the Oued Hallaïl' in English (translated in English as Leo 25 Airborne). It has been translated in German.

During the Falklands War in early 1982 comments publicly emerged from Clostermann expressing praise for the courage displayed by Argentine Air Force and Argentine Navy pilots during their air-to-sea attacks on the Royal Navy. Clostermann had written the comments, which were partly motivated by ethnic insults towards Argentinians that he had become aware of in the British press during the conflict, in a letter to a class of Argentine fighter-pilots who were being trained at that time in France at an Armée de l'Air establishment, at which his son was an instructor. The private letter's comments, from a renowned World War II military hero, swiftly found their way across the Atlantic Ocean to Buenos Aires, where they were published in newspapers as war propaganda. As a result of this perceived "betrayal" of his links with the United Kingdom via his war service in the Royal Air Force, Clostermann attracted hostility from parts of the British press.

He also attracted controversy in France for his vehement anti-war stance in the run-up to the 1991 Gulf War.

=== L'Histoire vécue: Un demi-siècle de secrets d'État ===
Published by Flammarion in 1998, L'Histoire vécue: Un demi-siècle de secrets d'État (lit. 'Lived History: A Half-Century of State Secrets', not translated in English) is a memoir in which Clostermann recounts encounters and covert missions spanning roughly fifty years of his public life. The book gathers anecdotes about historical figures he claims to have met or worked alongside, including Charles de Gaulle, Winston Churchill, Salazar (he spoke perfect portuguese, as he grew up in Brazil), Che Guevara, and the German fighter ace Hans-Ulrich Rudel. Clostermann, who had earlier served as a deputy in the French National Assembly and undertook discreet diplomatic assignments, presents himself in the book as both witness and participant in several episodes of postwar history, among them the Falklands War, the 1974 Carnation Revolution in Portugal, and the fall in 1973 of Salvador Allende in Chile.

== Death ==
Pierre Clostermann died on 22 March 2006 at his home at Montesquieu-des-Albères, in the French Pyrenees.

== Private life ==
While serving in Lincolnshire, Pierre met and married Lydia Jeanne Starbuck (1924 - 1971) at St Denys' Church in Sleaford on the 28th of April 1943.

Pierre later went on to remarry with Jacquelie Renaudat and have 3 sons, Jacques, Michel, and Jean-Pierre.

== Honours ==
On 6 June 2004, a road in Longues-sur-Mer, Normandy, near temporary airstrip B-11, was named after Clostermann.

=== French decorations ===
Grand Croix de la Légion d'Honneur
Compagnon de l'Ordre de la Libération - 21 January 1946
Médaille Militaire
Croix de Guerre 1939–45, with 27 citations including 17 to the level of the army (palms) and 2 stars
Croix de la Valeur Militaire with 2 citations
Médaille de la Résistance with rosette
Médaille de l'Aéronautique
Insigne des blessés militaires
Médaille commémorative des services volontaires dans la France libre
Médaille commémorative de la guerre 1939–1945

=== Foreign orders and decorations ===
Distinguished Service Order (United Kingdom)
Distinguished Flying Cross and bar (United Kingdom)
Distinguished Service Cross, US Army (United States of America)
WWII Croix de Guerre (device(s) unknown) (Belgium)
Grand Officer of the Nichan Iftikhar (Tunisia)
Knight of the Order of the Holy Sepulchre (Vatican)
Commander of the Order of Ouissam Alaouite (Morocco)
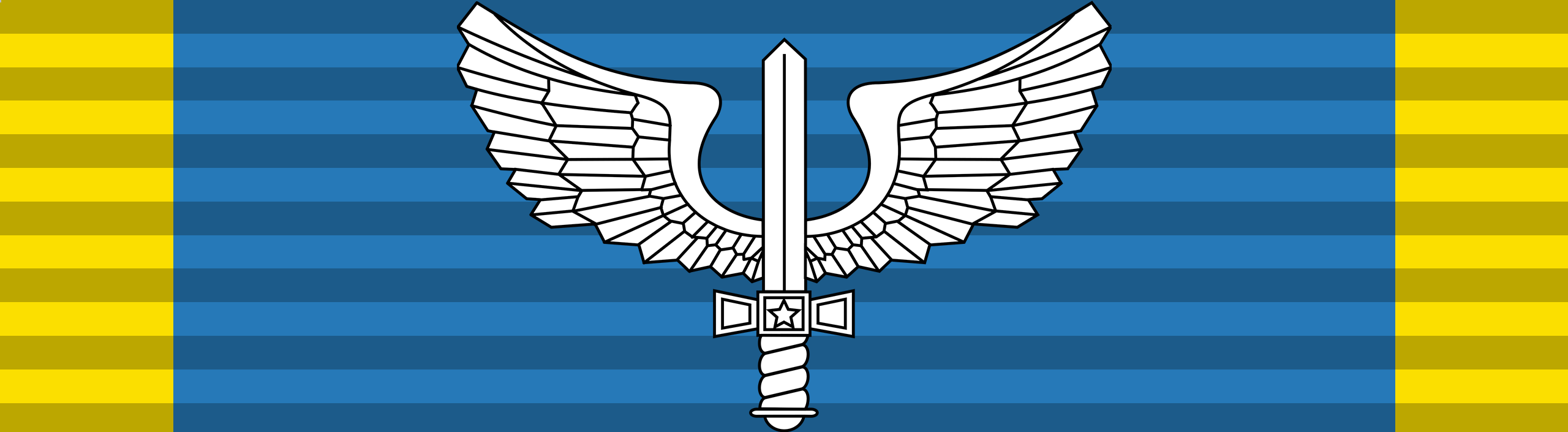
Santos-Dumont Medal of Merit, Brazilian Air Force (Brazil)
Knight of the Order of the Dannebrog (Denmark)
