= No. 341 Squadron RAF =

No. 341 (GC III/2 'Alsace') Squadron RAF
- Active: 15 January 1943 – 27 November 1945
- Country: United Kingdom
- Allegiance: Free French Forces
- Branch: Royal Air Force
- Part of: RAF Fighter Command
- Nickname(s): GC III/2 'Alsace'
- Motto(s): Friendship

Insignia
- Squadron Badge heraldry: On a hand three crowns of Alsace; The unit was named Groupe de Chasse Alsace and the three crowns symbolise liberty
- Squadron code: NL (Jan 1943 – Nov 1945)

The No. 341 Squadron also known in French as Groupe de Chasse n° 3/2 "Alsace", was a Free French squadron in the RAF during World War II.

== History ==
No. 341 Squadron was formed on 15 January 1943 at RAF Turnhouse, with personnel from the Free French Air Forces (Forces aériennes françaises libres). Pilots included veterans of the Free French Flight No.2 (FF Fighter Flt.) and of the Première Escadrille de Chasse (E.F.C. 1)). They had fought in the Western Desert alongside RAF fighter squadrons, such as No. 33 and No. 73 squadrons, and had been awarded the Ordre de la Libération on 21 June 1941.

The squadron was equipped with Spitfire VBs, its first commander being Squadron Leader René Mouchotte. The squadron moved to RAF Biggin Hill on 21 March 1943 and, re-equipped with Supermarine Spitfire L.F Mk.IXs, began to take part in sweeps over France. The squadron moved to Cornwall on 11 October 1943 for similar operations over Brittany, returning to RAF Merston on 14 April 1944 to join No. 145 Wing. Pierre Clostermann experienced his first aerial combat as a wingman of Sqn Ldr Mouchotte.

After covering the Allied landings in France in June 1944, No. 341 Squadron moved from Tangmere to Sommervieu (B8 airfield) in Normandy on 19 August and arrived in Belgium in September. Armed reconnaissance sweeps over Germany were directed mainly at enemy communications for the rest of the war, apart from a month at Turnhouse during February 1945 to equip with the Spitfire Mark XVI. On 28 May 1945 the squadron was presented with the Ordre de la Libération (Cross of Liberation).

On 27 November 1945, the squadron gave up its aircraft on transfer to Friedrichshafen and on the following day passed to the control of the Armée de l'Air. During the war the Squadron flew 5,469 operations, claiming some 30 aircraft shot down, and losing 21 pilots killed and 6 taken prisoner.

== See also ==
- Free French Flight
- List of RAF squadrons
