= Free French Flight =

Free French Flight refers to three specific fledgling units in the Free French Air Force (FAFL) which were created in the Middle East on 8 July 1940.

- Free French Flight N° 1 its name later changed to Escadrille N° 2 de Bombardement. Subsequently, it became the Nancy squadron of GB Lorraine. It was formed around two Martin 167A-3 Maryland bombers which flew to Mersa Matruh, Egypt, on 19 July 1940.
- Free French Flight N° 2 - its name later changed to Première Escadrille de Chasse (E.F.C. 1), and was commanded by Lieutenant Denis. It was hierarchically a part of No. 33 Squadron RAF, and the unit later had a dual designation of C Flight, No. 73 Squadron RAF. Subsequently, it became Groupe de Chasse Alsace.
- Free French Communication Flight N° 3 - its name later changed to French Transport Flight. It consisted of five different French-built aircraft, it was hierarchically a part of No. 267 Squadron RAF.

Free French Flight N° 2 was stationed at Haifa and initially consisted of one Potez 63.11 (a second and third arriving on 14 October and 3 November 1940 respectively) and two MS 406 (a third appearing on 14 February 1941). A Miles Magister was used as a hack and was superseded by a Loire 130 on 12 March 1941. The unit diary refers to the arrival of a Potez 29 and a Bloch MB.81 (with a Salmson 9 powerplant) from Heliopolis on 28 September 1940 but neither aircraft appears in the subsequent daily unit statistics forms (RAF Form 765a). A memo dated 4 April 1941 from the RAF's Free French liaison officer to General Spears advises 'in practically every case the aircraft were unserviceable chiefly owing to lack of spares'.

The port of Haifa was bombed on 6 September 1940 by the Regia Aeronautica. The four bombers were intercepted by Flying Officer Peronne in a Potez 63.11 and Warrant Officer Ballatore in a MS 406. Due to the deteriorating serviceability of the aircraft, flying hours decreased and the unit diary itself only covers September 1940.

In addition to these units, there were some units formed in the UK:

- Topic - six Blenheims. Along with "Jam", there was a redeployment to Fort Lamy. Both units were merged into the Groupe réservé de bombardement n°1 (GRB1), with an official inception date of 30 March 1941, which subsequently became the Metz squadron of GB Lorraine.
- Jam - Official designation Groupe de combat n°1 (GC1). It consisted of four squadrons.
- French Fighter Group - this unit's small complement of Dewoitine D.520 fighters became part of E.F.C. 1 (see above) and its Blenheims became part of GRB1.

Independent of the hierarchy of the RAF, there were aviation detachments in Chad, Cameroon and Equatorial Africa.

== See also ==
- No. 327 Squadron RAF
- No. 340 Squadron RAF
- No. 341 Squadron RAF
- No. 342 Squadron RAF
- List of RAF squadrons

== Aircraft of the Free French Flight ==
- Potez 63.11
- Dewoitine D.520
- Morane-Saulnier M.S.406
- Martin 167A-3 Maryland
- Bristol Blenheim
- Westland Lysander
- Hawker Hurricane
