= Auster AOP.9 =

British military observation aircraft

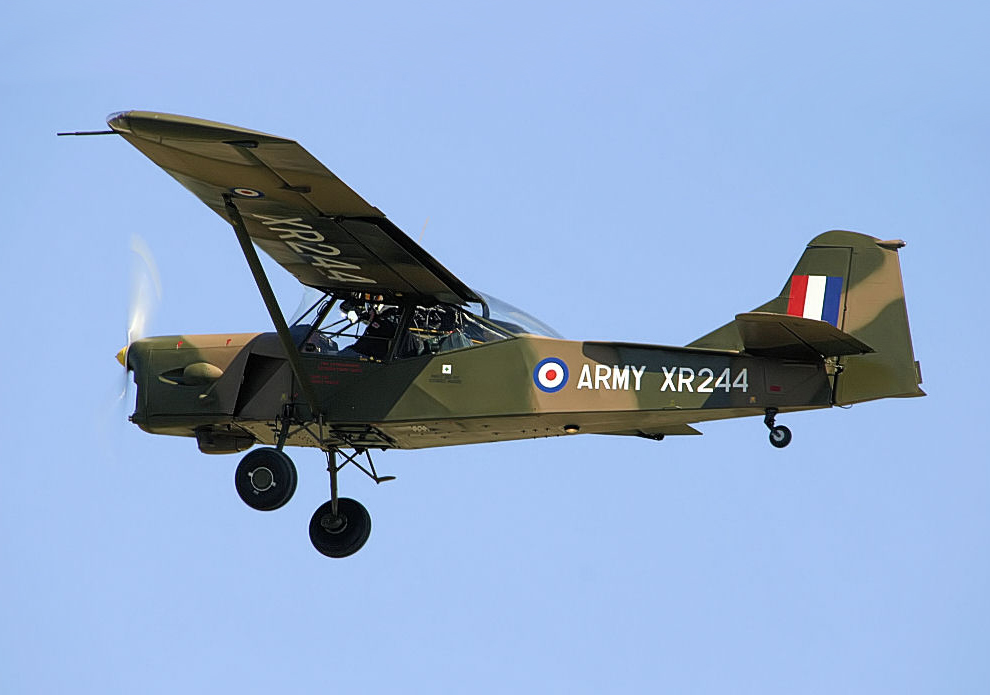
- AOP.9 XR244 at the RIAT 2005

General information
- Type: military observation aircraft
- Manufacturer: Auster Aircraft Limited
- Primary users: Army Air Corps Royal Air Force, Indian Air Force
- Number built: 182

History
- Introduction date: 1955
- First flight: 19 March 1954

The Auster AOP.9 was a British military air observation aircraft ("air observation post") produced by Auster Aircraft Limited to replace the Auster AOP.6.

== Design and development ==
The Auster AOP.9 was designed as a successor to the Auster AOP.6. Like its predecessor, it was a braced high-wing single engined monoplane with a fixed tailwheel undercarriage. Although having the same general appearance, the AOP.9 was a new design, with larger wing area and a more powerful engine. The wing and tail were metal-skinned, but the fuselage and ailerons were fabric-covered. The fin and rudder assembly were more angular in the new aircraft with a noticeable dorsal fillet. A combination of the more powerful 180 hp (134 kW) Blackburn Cirrus Bombardier engine, larger wings and large flaps gave it an improved take-off and landing performance compared with the AOP.6. It could operate from ploughed fields and muddy surfaces using low pressure tyres and strengthened undercarriage.

The cabin held three seats, pilot and passenger side-by-side and the observer behind, facing either forwards or rearwards. The aircraft was also designed to be convertible into a two-seat light transport with an interchangeable rear floor. In this configuration the observer sat alongside the pilot.

The prototype WZ662 first flew 19 March 1954. Auster Aircraft allotted its model designation B5 to the AOP.9 design.

== Operational history ==
Deliveries started to the Royal Air Force in February 1955, replacing AOP.6s in the regular AOP squadrons, the auxiliary squadrons disbanding in March 1957 before receiving AOP.9s. Until the formation of the Army Air Corps (AAC) in September 1957, Army personnel flew RAF aircraft based in RAF squadrons.

The aircraft were in action with No. 656 Squadron from September 1955, flying an average of 1,200 sorties per month. By the end of Operation Firedog in Malaya on 31 July 1960, 656 Squadron's AOP.6 and AOP.9s had carried out 143,000 sorties.

The AOP.9s were involved in several of Britain's other end of Empire conflicts; 653 Squadron AAC used them in Aden in the early 1960s, flying from Falaise, Little Aden. They stayed in service until 1966 and were the last fixed wing AOP aircraft used by the AAC, though their light transport role was taken over by Beavers.

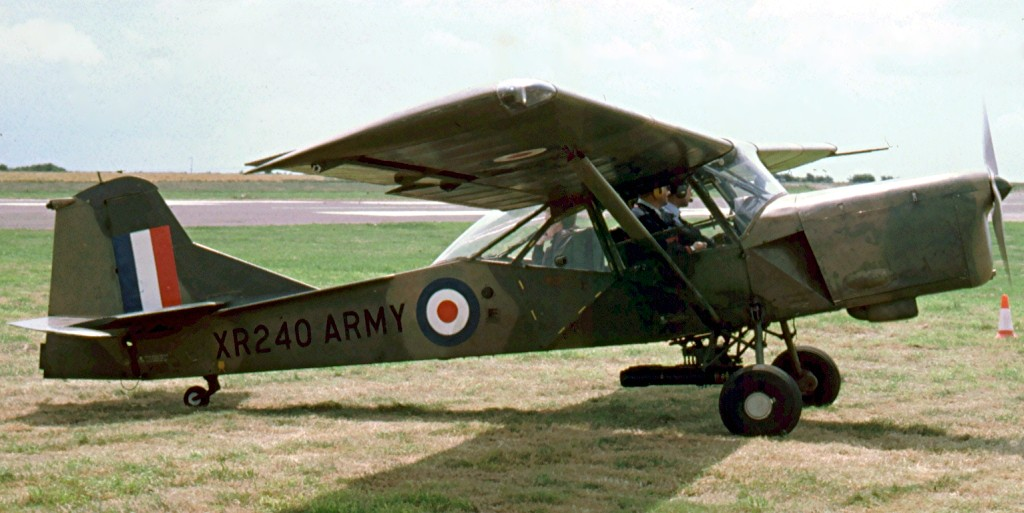
Formerly XR240, this aircraft now (2008) flies as G-BDFH

The South African Air Force operated its AOP.9s from 1957 to 1967.

The Army Historic Aircraft Flight maintain an AOP.9 in flying condition at Middle Wallop.

In the 1970s, 19 AOP.9s joined the UK civil register, and in 2008 14 remained, though only about three of these had a current certificate of airworthiness. The sole Beagle E3/Auster AOP.11 G-ASCC was flying until an accident in 2007.

== Variants ==
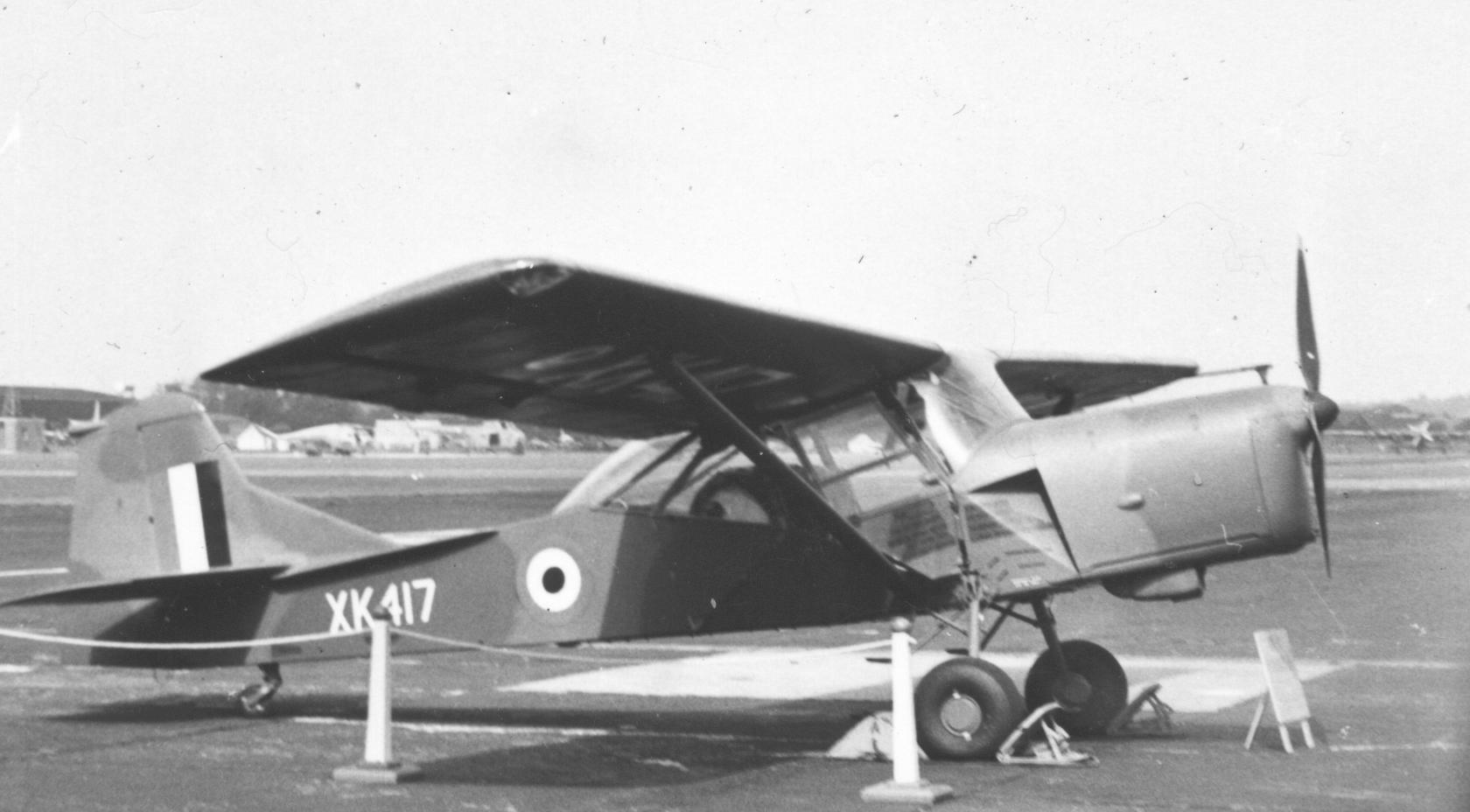
AOP.9 XK417 at the Farnborough Airshow in 1956, this aircraft served No. 652 Squadron RAF

Auster AOP.9
Only production version, 182 built.
Auster AOP.11
Three-seat AOP machine with a 260 hp Continental IO-470-D 6-cylinder horizontally opposed more powerful engine, that raised the maximum speed to 142 mph (228 km/h) and the empty weight to 1,806 lb (816 kg). Apart from the engine, the AOP.11 was almost identical to its predecessor. Early in its career, the undercarriage had spats, though these were later removed. Only one, a converted AOP.9 was produced, making its first flight on 18 August 1961 with serial XP254. A year later it was registered to Beagle aircraft, that had taken over Auster in 1960, as G-ASCC where it was known as the Beagle Mk 11, the E.3 or as the A.115. It was sold into private hands in 1971.

Auster 9M
A number of army surplus aircraft were bought by Captain Mike Somerton-Rayner in 1967. One was converted as an Auster 9M with a 180 hp (134 kW) Avco Lycoming O-360-A1D piston engine. The 9M first flew on 4 January 1968, and gained a Certificate of Airworthiness on 30 April 1968 The aircraft was still airworthy in 2009.

== Operators ==
=== Military operators ===
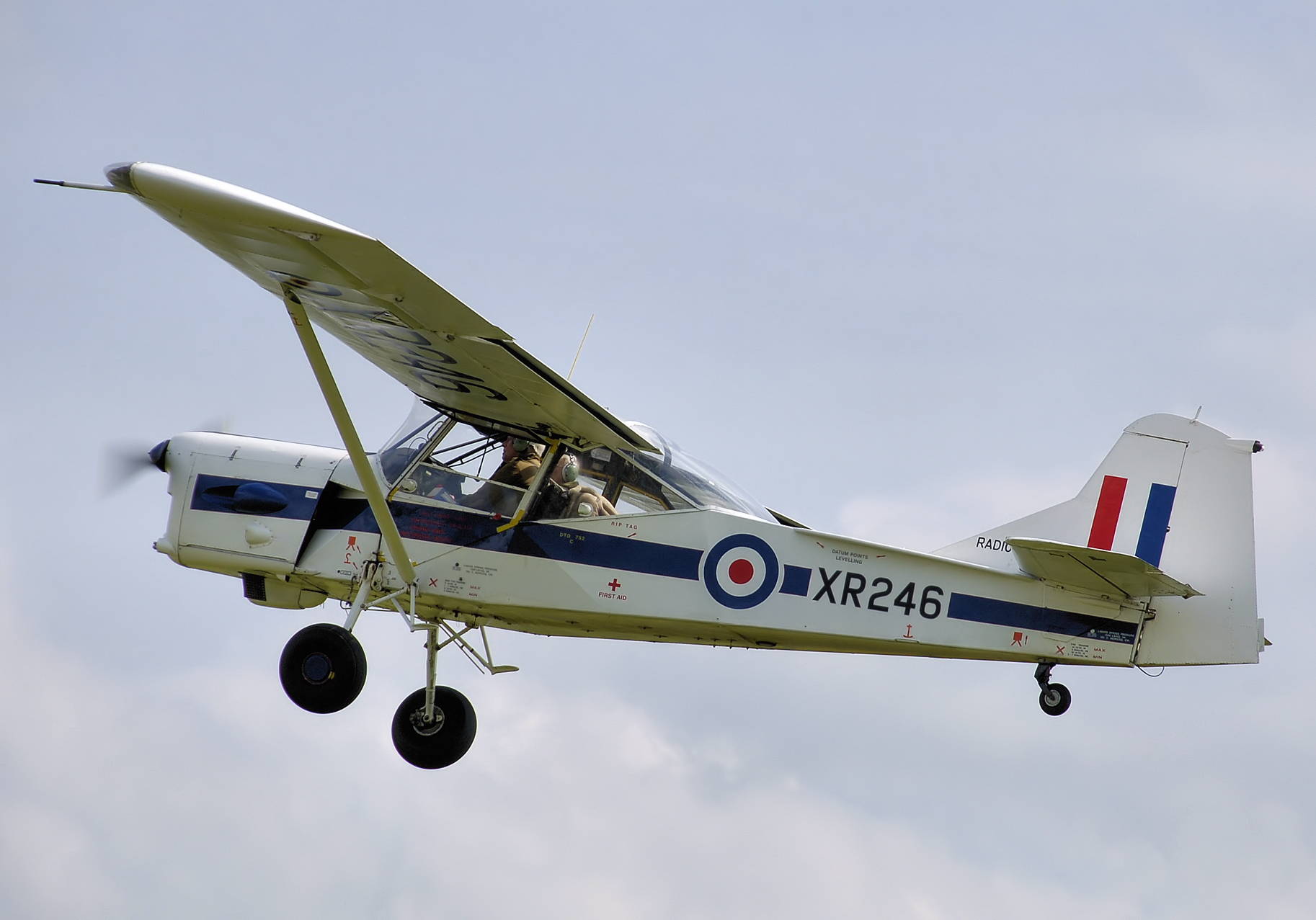
Privately owned 1961-built AOP.9 G-AZBU takes off in 2009

Hong Kong

- Royal Hong Kong Auxiliary Air Force about 4 ex-British AAC aircraft
- various ACC AOP and Independent Flights stationed in Hong Kong in the 1950s and 1960s

India
35 aircraft

- Indian Air Force
- Indian Army

South Africa

- South African Air Force Two aircraft
  - No 42 Squadron SAAF

United Kingdom
146 aircraft

- Army Air Corps
  - 653 Squadron
  - 656 Squadron
  - Advanced Fixed Wing Flight
  - Army Flights: 2, 3, 5, 6, 7, 8, 10, 11, 12, 13, 14, 16, 18, 20, 21.
  - Various Army Regiments
- Royal Air Force
  - 652 Squadron (January 1956 – September 1957)
  - 656 Squadron (September 1955 – September 1957)
  - Light Liaison Flight, South Korea
  - Christmas Island Flight, 160 Wing
  - 1900 Flight at Hong Kong
  - No. 38 Group Communication Flight at Upavon
  - Light Aircraft School at Middle Wallop

== Specifications (AOP.9) ==
Data from

General characteristics

- Crew: 3
- Length: 23 ft 8 1/2 in (7.226 m)
- Wingspan: 36 ft 5 in (11.10 m)
- Height: 8 ft 11 in (2.72 m)
- Wing area: 197.6 sq ft (18.36 m^{2})
- Airfoil: NACA 23012
- Empty weight: 1,460 lb (662 kg)
- Gross weight: 2,100 lb (953 kg)
- Fuel capacity: 16 imp gal (19 US gal; 73 L) (normal)
- Powerplant: 1 × Blackburn Cirrus Bombardier 203 4-cylinder inverted inline piston, 173 hp (129 kW)
- Propellers: Fairey-Reed fixed pitch

Performance

- Maximum speed: 127 mph (204 km/h, 110 kn)
- Cruise speed: 110 mph (180 km/h, 96 kn)
- Range: 242 mi (389 km, 210 nmi)
- Service ceiling: 18,500 ft (5,600 m) (absolute ceiling)
- Rate of climb: 920 ft/min (4.7 m/s)
  - Takeoff run in 6 mph (9.7 km/h; 5.2 kn) headwind: 324 ft (99 m)
  - Takeoff distance to 50 ft (15 m) in 6 mph headwind: 630 ft (192 m)
  - Landing run in 6 mph headwind: 180 ft (55 m)
  - Landing distance from 50 ft (15 m) in 6 mph headwind: 450 ft (137 m)

Armament

- Optional 4 x 4 in (100 mm) flares in under-fuselage light-bomb carrier

== See also ==
Related development

- Auster AOP.6

Related lists

- List of aircraft of the Royal Air Force
- List of aircraft of the Army Air Corps (United Kingdom)
