= List of Airspeed aircraft =

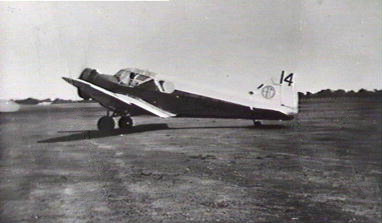
Airspeed AS.5 Courier

This is a list of aircraft produced or proposed by Airspeed Limited, a British aircraft manufacturer from 1931 to 1951.

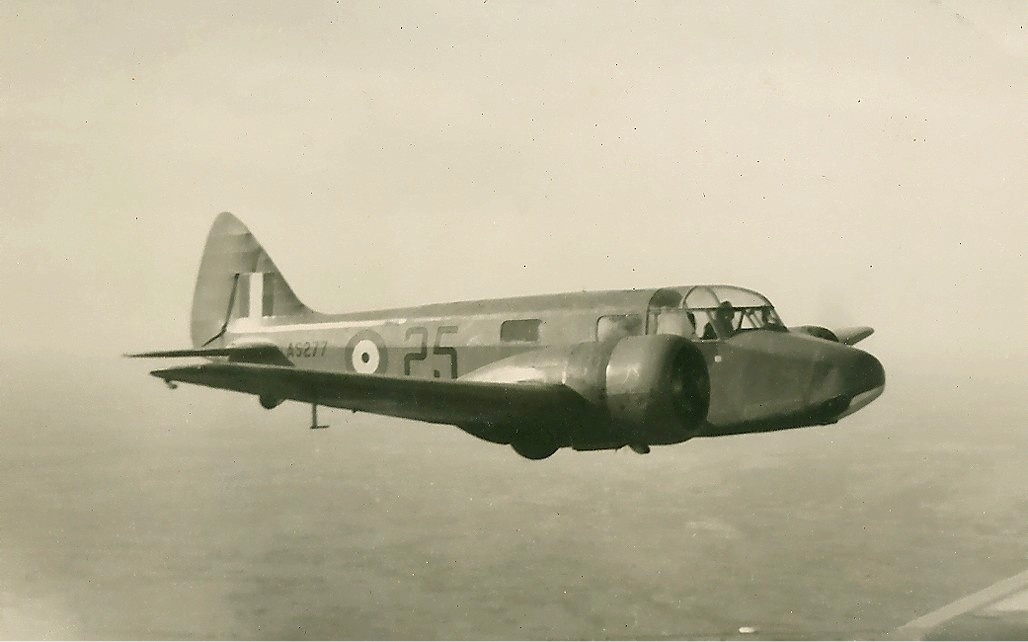
A Charles E. Brown in-flight view of an Airspeed AS.10 Oxford

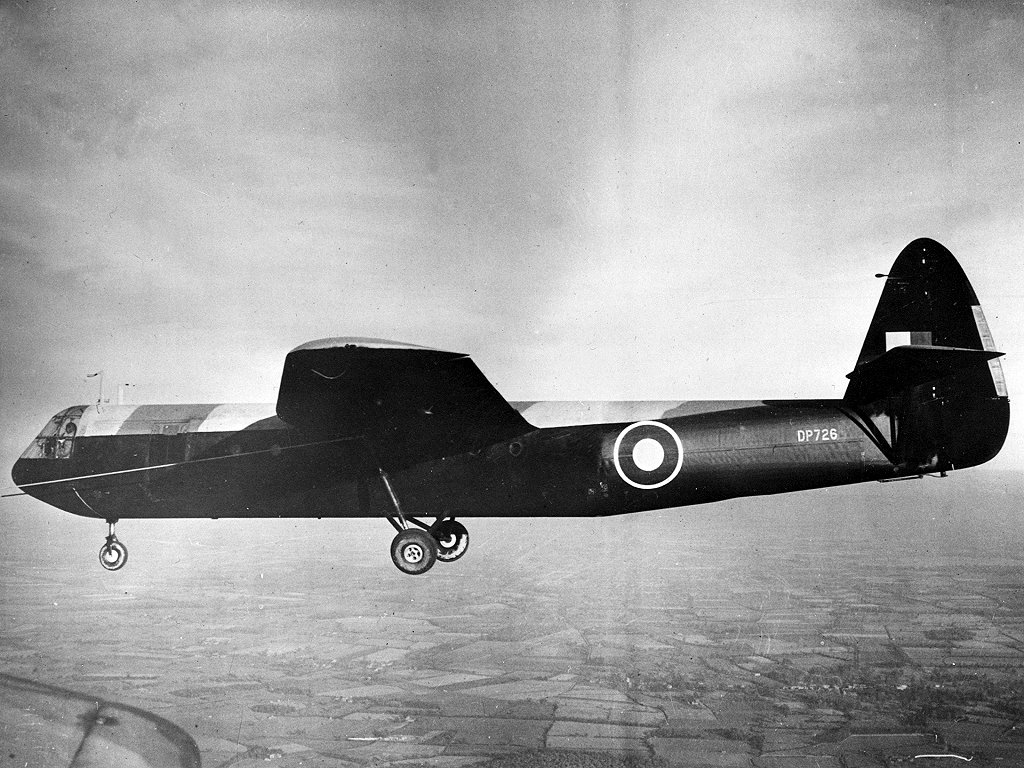
Airspeed Horsa Mk.1

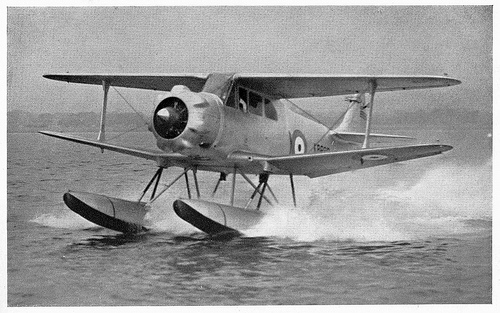
Airspeed Queen Wasp

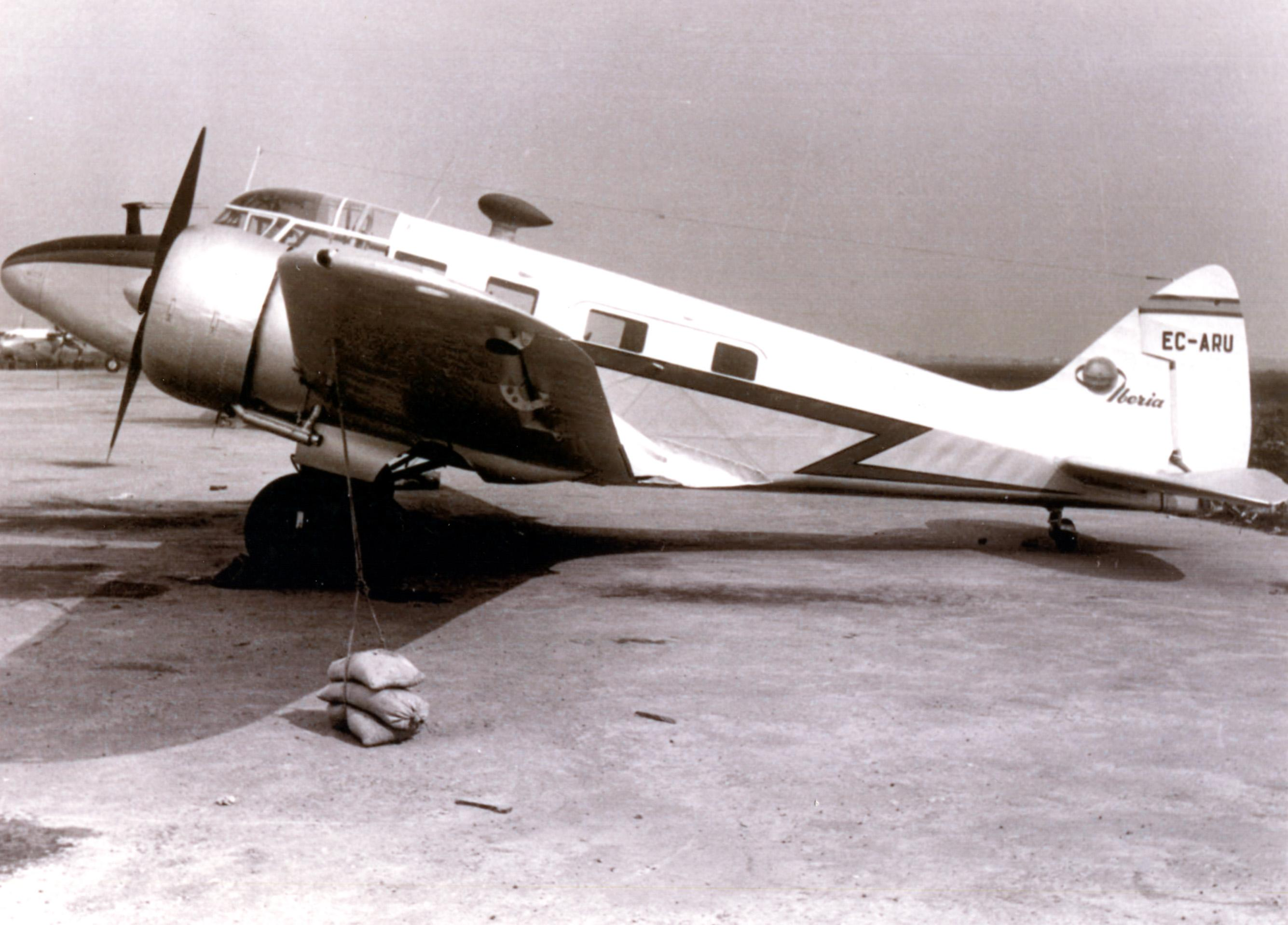
Airspeed AS.65 Consul

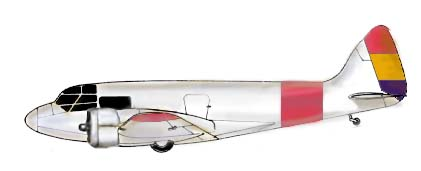
Airspeed AS.8 Viceroy

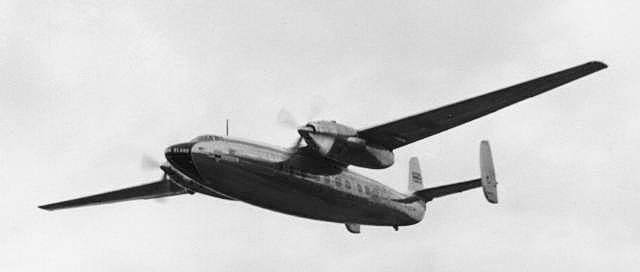
Airspeed Eland Ambassador at Farnborough 1955

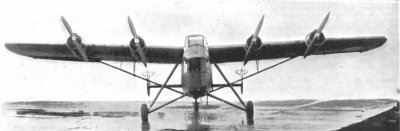
Airspeed AS.39 Fleet Shadower prototype

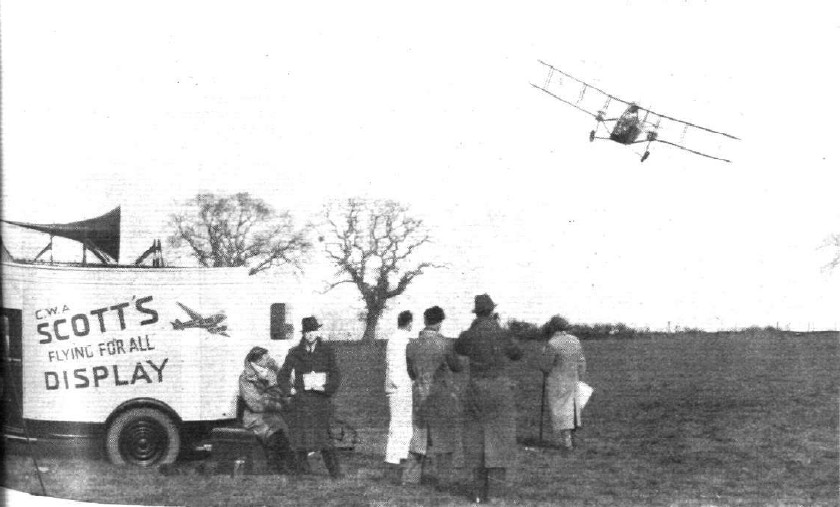
Airspeed AS.4 Ferry on approach

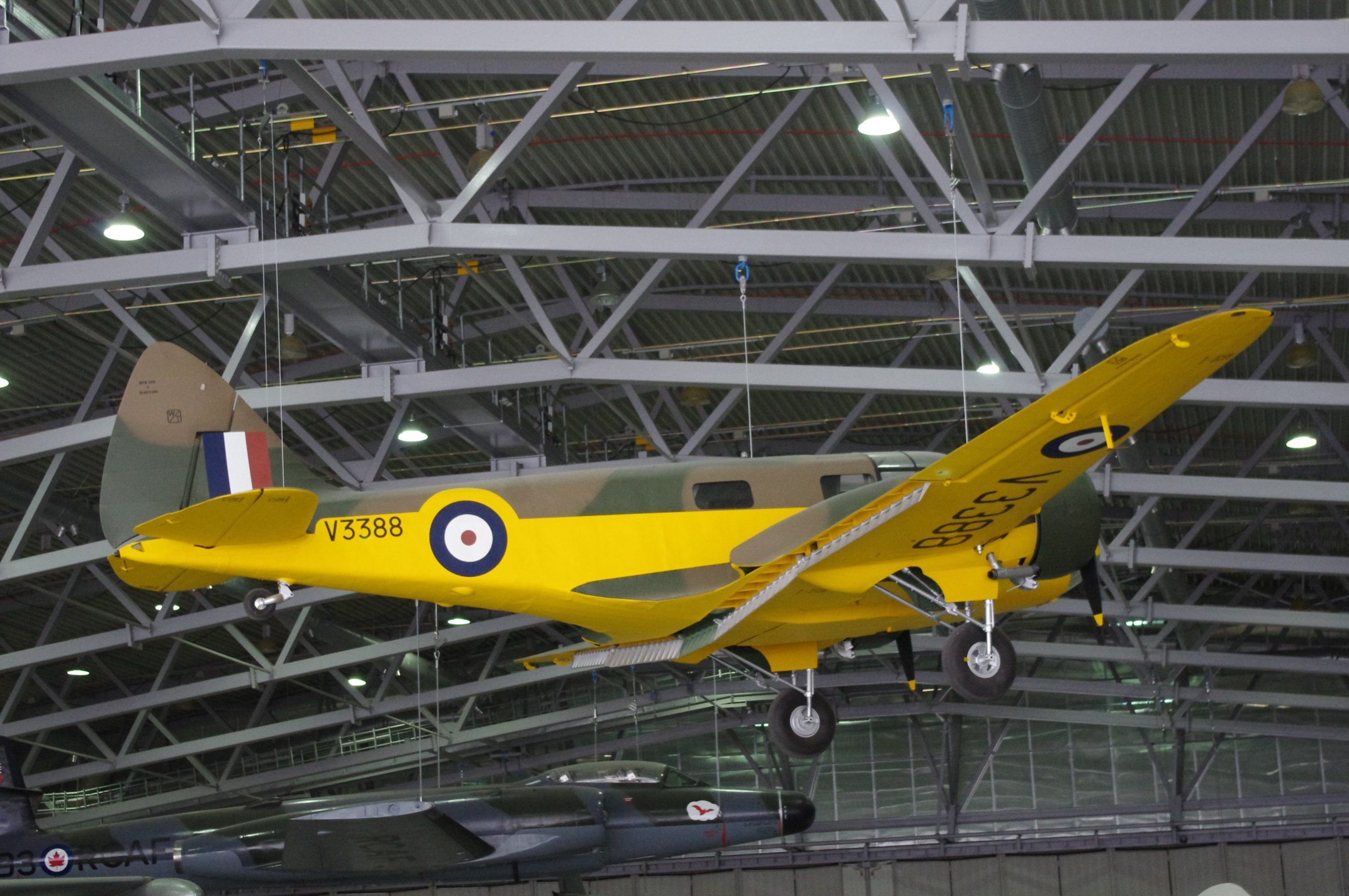
Airspeed AS.10 Oxford at the Imperial War Museum Duxford

== List of aircraft and projects ==
Model	Name	First flight	Remarks
AS.1	Tern	1931	Sailplane
AS.2			Glider project
AS.3			Two-seat monoplane project
AS.4	Ferry	1932	Ten-seat biplane
AS.5	Courier	1933	Five-seat monoplane
AS.6	Envoy	1934	Six-seat monoplane
AS.7			Projected military variants of the Envoy
AS.8	Viceroy	1934	Racing variant of the Envoy
AS.9		1935	Monoplane fighter project
AS.10	Oxford	1937	Twin-engined advanced trainer
AS.11	Courier		Projected all-metal variant for the Canadian-market
AS.12			Four-engined aircraft project
AS.14	Ambassador		Twin-engined 16-seat transport
AS.15			Bomber project
AS.16			planned licence build of Fokker F.XXII four-engine transport
AS.17			planned licence build of Fokker D.XVII single-seat fighter for Greece.
AS.18			Projected variant of the AS.17
AS.19			Fokker D.XIX single-seat fighter
AS.20			planned licence build of Fokker F.XXXVI transport
AS.21			Fokker D.XX single-seat fighter
AS.22			Fokker C.X two-seat fighter
AS.23			planned licence-built Douglas DC-2. None manufactured.
AS.24			Mailplane variant of the AS.14
AS.26			Gun-carrying biplane
AS.27	Irvine biplanes (2)	1936 (August)	Special defence-aircraft to Specification 38/35, two prototypes ordered by the Air Ministry but not built. Carrying a winch with 2000 feet of steel cable, to be released above cloud so that enemy bombers would not know where to expect barrage cables. the scheme was abandoned.
AS.28			Twin-engined passenger transport
AS.29			Bomber to Specification B.1/35
AS.30	Queen Wasp	1937	Radio-controlled target to Specification 32/35
AS.31			Twin-boom rear mounted cockpit fighter project to Specification F.35/35
AS.32			Airliner project
AS.33			24-seat airliner project
AS.34			Airliner project
AS.35			Airliner project
AS.36			Two-seat trainer to Specification T.1/37
AS.37			Radio-controlled flying boat target to specification Q.8/37
AS.38			Variant of the AS.30 for communications duties
AS.39	Fleet Shadower	1939	Naval observation aircraft to Specification S.23.37
AS.40	Oxford	1938	Radio-research variant of the Oxford
AS.41			Experimental Leonides-powered variant of the Oxford
AS.42	Oxford	1938	Variant of the Oxford for New Zealand to specification T.39/37
AS.43	Oxford	1938	Survey variant of the AS.42
AS.44			Oxford replacement project
AS.45	Cambridge	1941	Single-engined trainer to Specification T.4/39
AS.46	Oxford V	1942	Winterised variant of the Oxford
AS.47			Twin-boom bomber project
AS.48			Single-seat night fighter project
AS.49			Single-seat fighter/trainer to Specification T.24/40
AS.50	Queen Wasp		Production aircraft
AS.51	Horsa I	1941	Troop-carrying glider
AS.52	Horsa	1941	Bomb-carrying glider
AS.53			Vehicle transport variant of the Horsa
AS.54			Two-seat training glider to Specification TX.3/43
AS.55			Freighter project
AS.56			Single-seat fighter to Specification F.6/42
AS.57	Ambassador	1947	Airliner
AS.58	Horsa II	1943	Vehicle transport glider
AS.59	Ambassador II		Re-engined Ambassador project
AS.60	Ayrshire		Military transport variant of the Ambassador to Specification C.13/45
AS.61			Dakota I conversions
AS.62			Dakota II conversions
AS.63			Dakota III conversions
AS.64			Military transport variant of the Ambassador to Specification C.26/43
AS.65	Consul	1946	Civil version of the Oxford
AS.66			Freighter variant of the Ambassador
AS.67			Freighter variant of the Ambassador
