= Airspeed Courier =

British 6-seat, single engine aircraft (1933)

AS.5 Courier
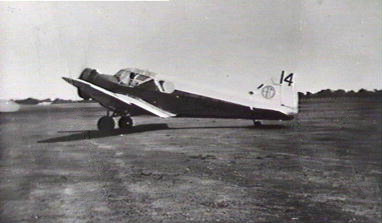
- Airspeed Courier AS.5 G-ACJL, pictured on 1934 MacRobertson England - Australia Air Race

General information
- Type: 5/6-seat light transport
- Manufacturer: Airspeed
- Designer: A. H. Tiltman
- Primary user: London, Scottish & Provincial Airways Ltd
- Number built: 16

History
- First flight: 10 April 1933

The Airspeed AS.5 Courier was a British six-seat single-engined light aircraft, designed and produced by the British aircraft manufacturer Airspeed Limited at Portsmouth. It was the first British aircraft fitted with a retractable undercarriage to go into quantity production.

Development work on the Courier started in 1931, envisioned as an advanced aircraft intended primarily for private owner-pilots. Its ambitious design, including its unorthodox undercarriage, attracted the attention of the British aviation pioneer, Sir Alan Cobham, who saw it as a suitable aircraft for demonstrating his airborne refuelling techniques for long distances flights. Following order confirmation in August 1932, a single prototype was constructed, performing its maiden flight on 10 April 1933.

The Courier quickly proved itself to be of sound design and laudable performance, encouraging Airspeed to commence small quantity production months later. The Courier was primarily purchased by civilian customers, being used as an early airliner, racing aircraft and flying testbed. It was also used as a communications aircraft by the Royal Air Force during the Second World War. Only a single aircraft flew briefly in the postwar era.

== Development ==
=== Origins ===
As the development effort on the Airspeed Ferry airliner was drawing to a close during 1931, company co-founder Hessell Tiltman was keen for the firm to commence another project. Prior to this, Airspeed's design team has exchanged several rough ideas for a conceptual aircraft suitable for use by private owners; it was asserted that, in comparison with existing models on the market, a modern aircraft for the role ought to be more useful and spacious, with sufficient capacity to accommodate five or six people at a time. Early drafts of what would become the Courier were produced and presented by Tiltman to Airspeed's board, who gave their authorisation for further work during November 1931.

According to the aviation author H.A. Taylor, the decision to incorporate hydraulically retractable undercarriage upon the aircraft is believed to have been inspired from the similar sized Lockheed Orion which was manually actuated, although Taylor also observes that this attribution may be apocryphal. The co-founder of Airspeed, Nevil Shute repeats this in his autobiography Slide Rule: Autobiography of an Engineer and believed this to be the first use of hydraulically retractable landing gear. During this era, while some figures felt that the choice led to an increase in aerodynamic performance as well as aesthetic appeal via its cleaner exterior, there were critics within British aviation circles that doubted the economic value of adopting this approach in light of the more complex mechanisms needed for retraction and deployment. Tiltman envisioned the aircraft as being relatively speedy and advanced amongst its peers, and that it could also be a suitable medium-sized transport in addition to its use by private owners.

Airspeed's efforts had coincided with those of another British aviation pioneer, Sir Alan Cobham, who was seeking out a suitable aircraft to carry out a long distance flight to India, which was to flown non-stop by using his early airborne refuelling techniques to demonstrate their practicality. As early as April 1932, talks between Airspeed, Cobham, and Lord Wakefield was underway, leading to a provisional contract being issued for a single aircraft on 6 May 1932. While Cobham and his benefactors were willing to pay £10,000 for this initial aircraft, including its single Armstrong Siddeley Lynx engine, they also insisted on a demanding timetable, including the aircraft's delivery by 6 April 1933, along with stringent penalty clauses if development fell behind.

There was also concerns amongst Airspeed's board over the project; Lord Grimthorpe was pessimistic over the use of a retractable undercarriage, having allegedly been influenced by external detractors. However, Tiltman vigorously defended the value of the design choice, and was backed by several other board members, thus the feature was retained. The arrangements between Cobham and Airspeed were confirmed in full during August 1932, leading to construction of the prototype Courier commencing at Airspeed's York facility during the following month, despite the design not being finalised until October 1932.

=== Into flight ===
The prototype was built and tested at a relatively high speed in order that the aircraft could be delivered to Cobham as soon as practical. In particular, the fabrication of its undercarriage had overwhelmingly needed original components that were designed and built internally due to a lack of part availability in the supply chain. Airspeed relocated from York to Portsmouth in early 1933, necessitating the prototype being moved via road to the company's new facility. Following its reassembly, the prototype Courier G-ABXN performed its maiden flight on 10 April 1933, piloted by George Stainforth of the Royal Aircraft Establishment.

The initial flight tests were performed without the engine's cowling being present, yet the prototype still achieved performance close to that which had been estimated for the finalised design, including its maximum speed of 160 MPH. Suitably impressed by its early performance, later flights were frequently observed by members of rival British aircraft manufacturers. During the test flight programme, the prototype sustained two minor accidents, in April 1933 at Portsmouth and in June 1933 at RAF Martlesham Heath, being quickly repaired after both occasions.

Having gained confidence in the design's attributes by the prototype's relatively smooth testing experience, Airspeed opted to commenced quantity production of the Courier during the summer of 1933. On 4 September 1933, the first production aircraft of an initial batch of three was delivered to the type's appointed distributor Air Exchange and Mart, who promptly used on a demonstration flight to Scotland along with further promotion flights aimed at encouraging sales. By December of that year, two basic versions of the aircraft were on offer, one tailored for the domestic market and the other intended for overseas use amongst the colonies of the British Empire.

== Design ==
The Airspeed Courier was a wooden low-wing cantilever cabin monoplane, incorporating numerous advanced features for the era. One such novelty was its use of a retractable undercarriage; this was a patented innovation internally developed by Airspeed, to which the company would subsequently earn revenue from when it was adopted upon other aircraft such as the Airspeed Oxford. It was estimated that the additional weight of the mechanism for retracting and deploying the undercarriage amounted to 30lb, while an increase in cruising speed of 20 MPH was achieved via reduced drag. Actuation was performed by the pilot via a hand-driven hydraulic pump. According to Taylor, the undercarriage generated considerable attention amongst the aviation press early on.

Other aspects of the aircraft, such as its structural design, were relatively conventional. The wing's centre section was integral with the fuselage, while the outer wing's structure comprised a pair of spruce box spurs joined with ply former ribs. The wing had a fabric covering, aside from the leading edge; while the fuselage comprised a plywood exterior supported by welded tubes. The tailplane featured a cantilever fin, and was adjustable via a screw jack mechanism.

The Courier was designed to be customised for both long-distance and short-distance operations; customers were offered two alternative fuel tankage arrangements, one accommodated 28 gallons between a tank in the wing's center section while the other spread a total of 66 gallons across a pair of center section tanks and a header tank. However, the prototype was equipped with an even-greater fuel capacity of 275 gallons, although the aircraft couldn't takeoff with so much fuel due to being significantly overweight, thus this expanding capacity could only ever be fully exploited mid-flight via aerial refuelling. Multiple powerplants were also offered; while the Armstrong Siddeley Lynx engine was promoted for domestic use, the Armstrong Siddeley Cheetah radial engine was also used upon most Couriers.

== Production and operations ==
While the prototype did not manage Cobham's original deadline of 6 April 1933, he was not ready to perform his long-distance flight for some time either. Following roughly one year of practise to perfect his airborne refuelling technique, Cobham took off from Portsmouth in the prototype Courier on an attempted flight to India on 24 September 1934, during which he successfully refuelled from a Handley Page W.10 while doing so; however, Cobham was compelled to conduct a forced landing at Malta on account of a broken throttle. Despite this outcome, the practicality of his aerial refuelling practices had been successfully proven, and would continue to be refined in subsequent years.

Between 1933 and 1934, Airspeed manufactured a total of 15 production grade Couriers. They were sold to civilian customers who used them for a variety of purposes, including its use as a compact airliner and as an air taxi. Early on, several different firms attempted early airline routes using the aircraft. The Courier was also popular for a time amongst the air racing sector of the market; one aircraft (the first production aircraft) came in sixth place in the MacRobertson Air Race between Great Britain and Australia during late 1934.

Shute wrote in Slide Rule that six Couriers came back to the company when their operating company suspended operations but shortly after that the Spanish Civil War broke out and the machines all sold immediately to various intermediaries for better than the original prices, and all went by devious routes to Spain. He had got a reputation as unscrupulous for resisting the auditors’ attempt to write their value down on the books; see Airspeed Ltd.

In 1936, a gun-running organization, Union Founders' Trust, bought five Couriers with the intention of selling them for use by the Republicans in the Spanish Civil War. However, protests from the non-interference lobby in England stopped delivery. Two Republican sympathisers on the Airspeed staff made an abortive attempt to steal G-ACVE. One of them, Arthur Gargett, died when it crashed after taking off at Portsmouth on 20 August 1936; the other, Joseph Smith, was sentenced to four months in prison.

Owing to its advanced aerodynamics, two Couriers were used as research aircraft, one by the Royal Aircraft Establishment (RAE) and one by Napier's, who used it for development of the Napier Rapier engine. The RAE aircraft was modified by Airspeed via the addition of high-lift devices and drag inducers, along with modified controls, for testing purposes.

At the outbreak of the Second World War, the majority of the surviving Couriers were impressed into the Royal Air Force (RAF), where they were typically used for communications purposes. Only a single Courier survived the conflict, and was briefly used for joyriding flights at Southend-on-Sea prior to being scrapped during December 1947.

== Variants ==
AS.5 Courier
Prototype - 240 hp (179 kW) 240 hp Armstrong Siddeley Lynx IVC
AS.5A Courier
Main production type - 240 hp (179 kW) Armstrong Siddeley Lynx IVC.
AS.5B Courier
Fitted with more powerful 277 hp (207 kW) Armstrong Siddeley Cheetah V engine. Two built.
AS.5C Courier
One aircraft, registered G-ACNZ was bought as an engine testbed by Napier - Powered by 325 hp (242 kW) Napier Rapier IV engine.

== Accidents and incidents ==
On 29 September 1934, G-ACSY of London, Scottish & Provincial Airways Ltd crashed at Shoreham, Kent, United Kingdom, killing all four people on board and injuring two on the ground.

== Operators ==
United Kingdom

- Air Taxis Ltd
- Channel Airways
- Cobham Air Routes
- London, Scottish & Provincial Airways
- North Eastern Airways
- Air Transport Auxiliary
  - No. 3 Ferry Pilots Pool
- Royal Air Force

== Specification ==
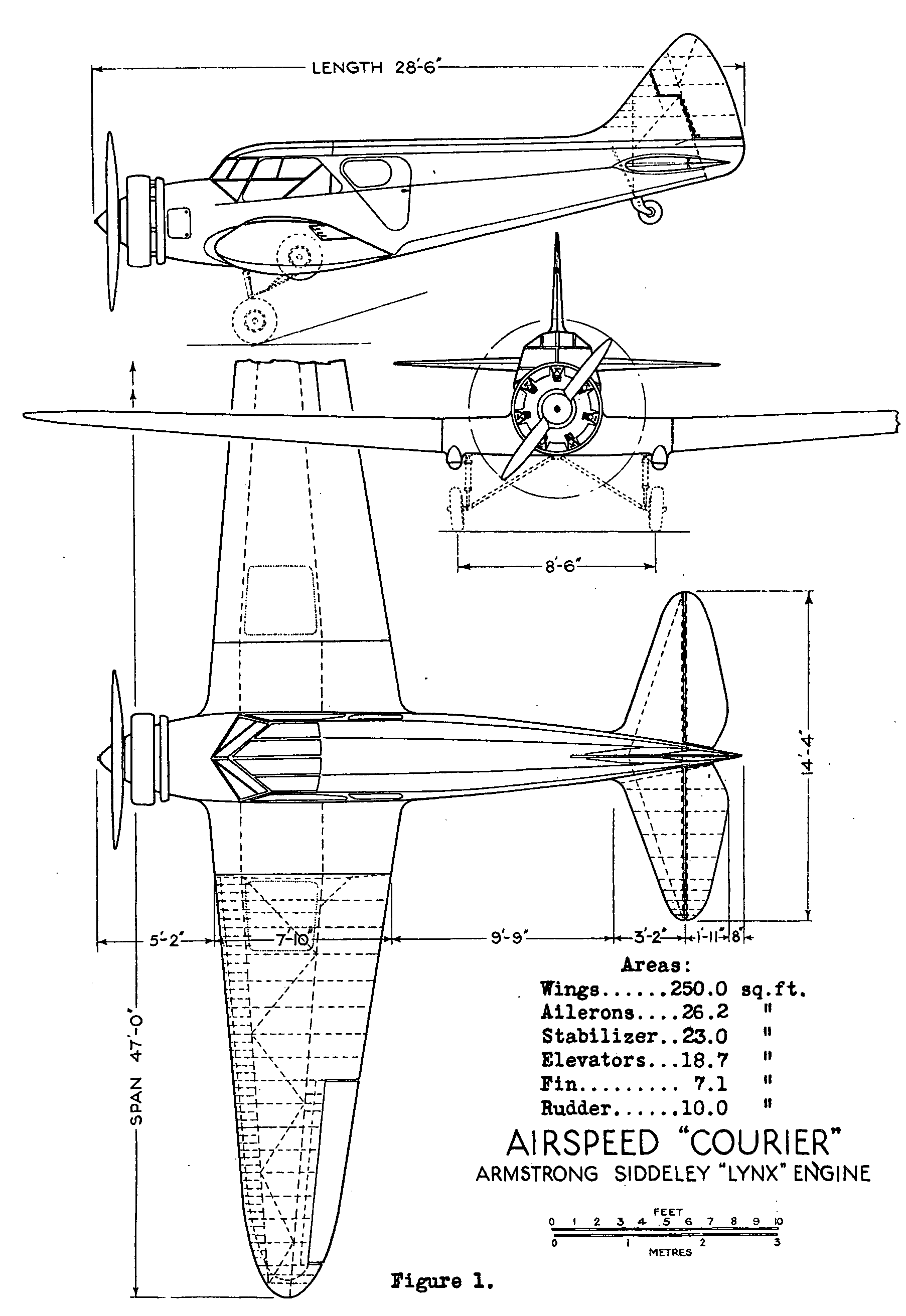
Airspeed AS.5 Courier 3-view drawing from NACA-AC-178

Data from British Civil Aircraft since 1919

General characteristics

- Crew: 1
- Capacity: Five passengers
- Length: 28 ft 6 in (8.69 m)
- Wingspan: 47 ft 0 in (14.33 m)
- Height: 8 ft 9 in (2.67 m)
- Wing area: 250 sq ft (23 m^{2})
- Empty weight: 2,344 lb (1,063 kg)
- Gross weight: 3,900 lb (1,769 kg)
- Powerplant: 1 × Armstrong Siddeley Lynx IVC air-cooled seven-cylinder radial engine, 240 hp (180 kW)

Performance

- Maximum speed: 153 mph (246 km/h, 133 kn)
- Cruise speed: 132 mph (212 km/h, 115 kn)
- Range: 635 mi (1,022 km, 552 nmi)
- Service ceiling: 13,500 ft (4,100 m)
- Rate of climb: 730 ft/min (3.7 m/s)

== See also ==
Related lists

- List of aircraft of the RAF
- Supermarine Seagull V, the first British military aircraft to have a retractable undercarriage.
