= Westland IV =

IV/Wessex
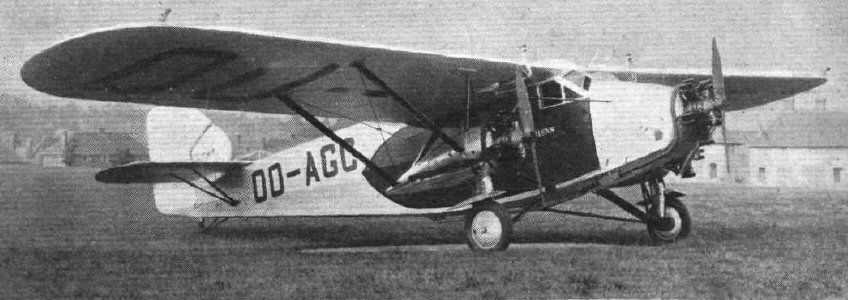
- Westland Wessex of SABENA. This aircraft was originally built as a Westland IV, registered as G-AAJI, then upgraded to a Wessex and sold to SABENA as OO-AGC, then later sold to Cobham Air Routes and registered again as G-ABAJ.

General information
- Type: Light transport aircraft
- National origin: United Kingdom
- Manufacturer: Westland Aircraft
- Designer: Arthur Davenport, Robert Bruce
- Primary user: Sabena
- Number built: 10

History
- First flight: 22 February 1929

The Westland IV and Westland Wessex were British high wing, three-engined light transport aircraft built by Westland Aircraft.

== Design and development ==
In 1928, Westland began work on a small three-engined airliner, suitable for low volume, "feeder-liner" type operation, as a follow-on to its single-engined Westland Limousine transport. The new type was known as the Limousine IV early in development, which soon became the name Westland IV. The Westland IV was a high-winged monoplane with a mainly wooden structure. The fuselage was of square section and built around spruce longerons and ash frames, with internal wire bracing and fabric covering. The wings had wooden box spars and spruce wing ribs in a Warren girder arrangement and were braced to the fuselage by streamlined struts. The aircraft had a fixed tailwheel undercarriage.

The Westland IV first flew on 21 February 1929 at which time it was powered by the 95 hp (71 kW) Cirrus engine. This prototype was registered as G-EBXK and was certified for a crew of two and four passengers. The second machine had Hermes engines and a metal rear fuselage. The third machine, G-ABAJ, was modified to take the 105 hp (78 kW) Armstrong Siddeley Genet Major engines as well as some other changes and became the prototype Westland Wessex. The two Westland IVs were subsequently converted to Wessexes giving 10 aircraft in total.

== Cobham Air Routes Ltd ==
The Wessex was noted for its reliability and ability to make short landing runs. This made it attractive to Sir Alan Cobham in 1935 when he was looking for a small airliner to use for a service between Guernsey and the British mainland. Previously, flying boats had provided a service between Portsmouth and St Peter Port on the island. There was no public airfield at the time on Guernsey, only the private airfield at L'Eree run by the Guernsey Aero Club, of which Cobham was a member. The Wessex was certified as the only commercial aircraft to use L'Eree. Cobham's airline, Cobham Air Routes Ltd, used the following Wessex aircraft:

G-EBXK – Westland serial number 1771, granted its certificate of airworthiness on 21 March 1929. Originally the prototype Westland IV and retained as a demonstrator, later converted to a Wessex and sold to Cobham Air Routes Ltd in 1935 and withdrawn from use in 1936.

G-ABAJ – Westland serial number 1897, granted its certificate of airworthiness on 27 May 1930. Built as a Westland IV and registered as G-AAJI, originally intended for service in Kenya with Wilson's Airways but the order was never taken up. Instead, G-AAJI was rebuilt as a Wessex and sold to Sabena with Belgian registration OO-AGC, before being in turn sold to Cobham in 1935. This aircraft was used by Trafalgar Advertising in 1936.

G-ADEW – Westland serial number 1899, granted its certificate of airworthiness on 6 August 1930, sold to Sabena and registered as OO-AGF, then bought by Cobham in 1935. Unfortunately, this aircraft was lost in the Channel on 3 July 1935, 3 to 4 miles south of The Needles. The only passenger on board, a Mr C F Grainger, was picked up by the SS Stanmore and taken to Fowey. The pilot, W H Ogden, was presumed drowned within the aircraft and was never found. The blame was largely placed on Ogden, but was probably also due to the age of the Wessex airframes and their engines. This accident was the last straw for Sir Alan, who was struggling operationally, and he sold his airline to Olley Air Service.

G-ADFZ – Westland serial number 1900, granted its certificate of airworthiness on 30 August 1930, sold to Sabena and registered as OO-AGF, and bought by Cobham in 1935. G-ADFZ went on to work for Trafalgar Advertising with G-ABAJ, and it was decided to take G-ADFZ to Blackpool for the air display in September 1935. On 7 September 1935 it was involved in a collision over Blackpool with an Avro 504N (G-ACOD), the Wessex crashing in Cedar Square with the crew safe but all three occupants of the Avro being killed. Repaired, G-ADFZ was finally withdrawn from service on 1 December 1946.

== Operators ==
Egypt

Egyptian Air Force

United Kingdom

Royal Air Force

Great Western Railway Air Services Ltd – passenger air services between Cardiff Municipal Airport and Plymouth (1934–1939)

Cobham Air Routes – passenger air services between Christchurch Airfield and Guernsey L'Eree (1935)

Portsmouth, Southsea and Isle of Wight Aviation Co., Ltd – passenger services.

Trafalgar Advertising Co Ltd – night-time airborne illuminated advertising, including for Oxo.

Imperial Airways – passenger services.

AST Ltd, Hamble – taken on by RAF and used as navigation trainers from 1939

Belgium

SABENA – passenger services, sold their aircraft to Cobham Air Routes Ltd in 1935.

== Specifications Wessex (Genet Major 1A) ==
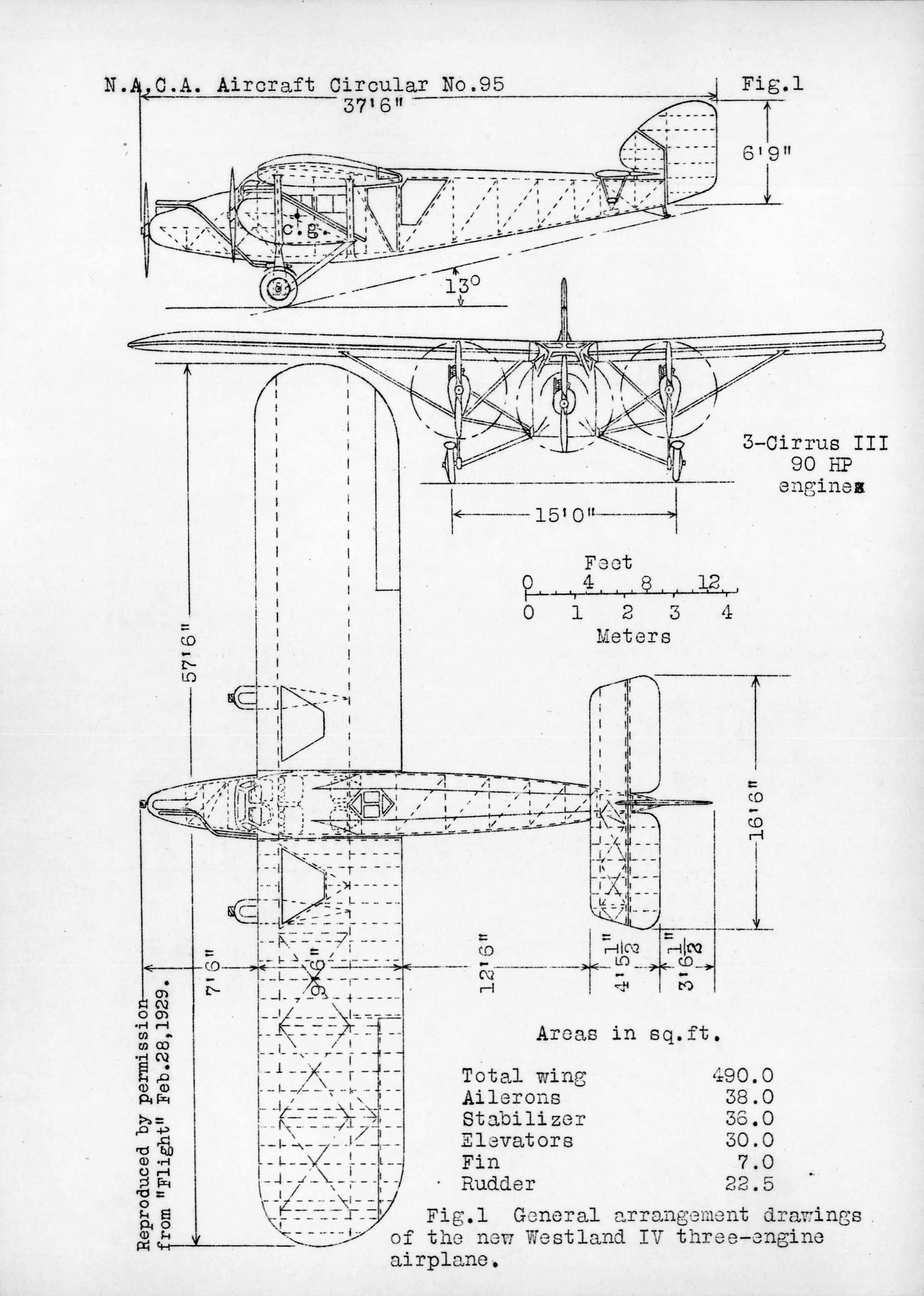
Westland IV 3-view drawing from NACA Aircraft Circular No.95

Data from British Civil Aircraft 1919–1972: Volume III

General characteristics

- Crew: 2 (pilot and mechanic)
- Capacity: 4 passengers
- Length: 38 ft 0 in (11.58 m)
- Wingspan: 57 ft 6 in (17.53 m)
- Height: 9 ft 6 in (2.90 m)
- Wing area: 490 sq ft (46 m^{2})
- Empty weight: 3,891 lb (1,765 kg)
- Max takeoff weight: 6,300 lb (2,858 kg)
- Powerplant: 3 × Armstrong Siddeley Genet Major 1A seven-cylinder air-cooled radial engine, 140 hp (100 kW) each

Performance

- Maximum speed: 122 mph (196 km/h, 106 kn)
- Cruise speed: 100 mph (160 km/h, 87 kn)
- Range: 420 mi (680 km, 360 nmi)
- Service ceiling: 14,900 ft (4,500 m)
- Rate of climb: 680 ft/min (3.5 m/s)
