= Airspeed Consul =

Twin-engine piston utility transport

AS.65 Consul
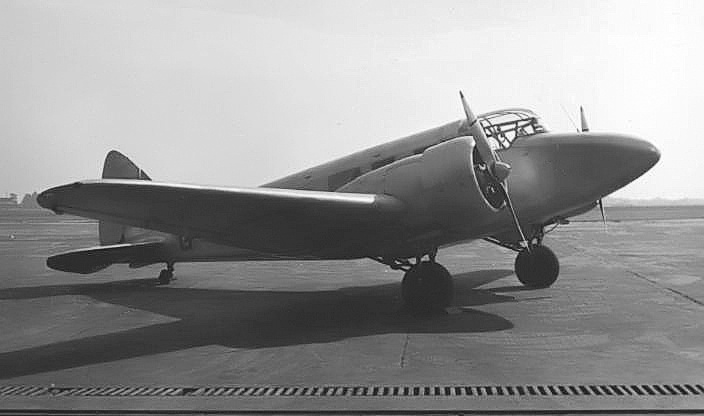
- Airspeed Consul G-AIDX of Esso Petroleum at Manchester in 1954

General information
- Type: Utility transport
- Manufacturer: Airspeed Limited
- Status: Out of production, out of service
- Primary users: Israeli Defence Force Air Force Argentine Air Force; Union of Burma Air Force; Royal New Zealand Air Force
- Number built: 162

History
- First flight: 1946
- Developed from: Airspeed Oxford

The Airspeed Consul is a twin-engined light transport aircraft and affordable airliner designed and produced by the British aircraft manufacturer Airspeed Limited. Introduced during the immediate post-war period, it was a straightforward conversion of surplus Airspeed Oxford military trainers that had been extensively used during the Second World War.

Early on in the conflict, Airspeed's management recognised that the vast numbers of Oxfords then in military service would need a new purpose as an inevitable consequence of demobilisation greatly reducing military demand for the type. Upon the war's end, the company acquired numerous Oxfords from the British government and begun converting the type for the needs of civilian customers. The first aircraft, G-AGVY, was certified for operations in March 1946; a further 50 aircraft would be converted over the following months.

The Consul was developed into various models, each being typically suited for a particular role, such as an air ambulance, freighter, executive transport, and airliner. Airspeed marketed the type particularly heavily towards private owner-pilots and businesses, the latter being an atypical choice for the era. A number were also produced with armaments, having been militarised and exported to multiple overseas air forces. By the end of production, 162 Consuls had been produced.

== Development ==
=== Background ===
During the first half of the 1930s, the British aircraft manufacturer Airspeed Limited produced the Envoy, an eight-seat civil transport that also promptly attracted the attention of military operators. Accordingly, during the late 1930s, a militarised derivative of the Envoy, known as the Oxford, was developed and introduced, being primarily used as a trainer aircraft. The Oxford was used in vast numbers by the Royal Air Force (RAF) in addition to several other air forces, forming a key element of the British Commonwealth Air Training Plan; a total of 8,586 were produced.

As early as 1940, Airspeed's management were considering the future postwar era and the fate of the large numbers of Oxfords that the company was mass-producing at that time; recognising that military demands would be curtailed, it was thus sensible for surplus aircraft to be converted for use by civilian operators instead. It was recognised that an affordable general purpose twin-engined transport aircraft, suitable for use as an airliner, would likely appeal to such operators. Having planned in advance of the conflict's end, following Victory in Europe Day, Airspeed quickly negotiated to buy back Oxfords from the British government, arranging the purchase of not only complete aircraft but also partially-assembled examples that were in progress at various factories.

The conversion process commenced immediately upon acquisition, with the first aircraft, G-AGVY, being certified for operations in March 1946 and sold to a private operator shortly thereafter. Due to it being a relatively straightforward conversion of an existing aircraft with only minor modifications being made, securing civil airworthiness certification was both quick and easy. The type was assigned the name Consul. In addition to targeting airlines, Airspeed believed there was a viable market for the type amongst private owner-pilots, as there had been for such aircraft during the interwar period. Furthermore, there was an intention focus on marketing the aircraft towards business purposes, a direction which aviation author H. A. Taylor observed to be a particularly innovative approach for the era.

=== Launch ===
From 1946, 162 Oxfords (Note: 161 Consuls were sold by Airspeed, with the second prototype, G-AEHF retained by Airspeed.) were refurbished by Airspeed and adapted for civilian use at the firm's facility in Portsmouth. Of these, 50 alone were produced between May and October 1946. Structural alterations involved in the conversion included cut-outs to add an extra pair of windows on either side of the fuselage, the installation of an elongated nose that functioned as a forward compartment for storing baggage, and the addition of a partition wall between the cockpit and the cabin areas. The tail plane was also adjusted to account for the changed centre of gravity resulting from these other modifications, which also increased the aircraft's fore-and-aft stability.

The Consul was a relatively affordable endeavour as surplus Oxfords were both common and inexpensive to acquire. It proved to be superficially attractive as a small twin-engine airliner, and Airspeed promptly offered a conversion kit for this specific purpose. In a charter configuration, the Consul's cabin would be typically outfitted with five seats, although the addition of a sixth seat was possible. The cabin furnishings consisted of detachable carpets, leather upholstery, and fabric trimmings of various colours. In the cockpit, the radio operator would be seated alongside the pilot in the former instructor's position.

Multiple variants of the Consul were developed by Airspeed, often to suit particular niche roles of the market. One such model, intended for use as an air ambulance, featured a large upwards-opening door and could accommodate a pair of stretcher-bound patients along with one or two seated patients. A convertible model featured the same large door, which was intended to be alternatively used as a freighter and communications purposes. A specialised executive transport was also produced, its cabin accommodating up to four seated passengers along with a lavatory and additional space for luggage. Somewhat paradoxically, a militarised reconversion was also devised; this model was armed with two forward-firing .303 machine guns, up to eight 25lb rockets, and a single rear-facing turret.

== Operational history ==
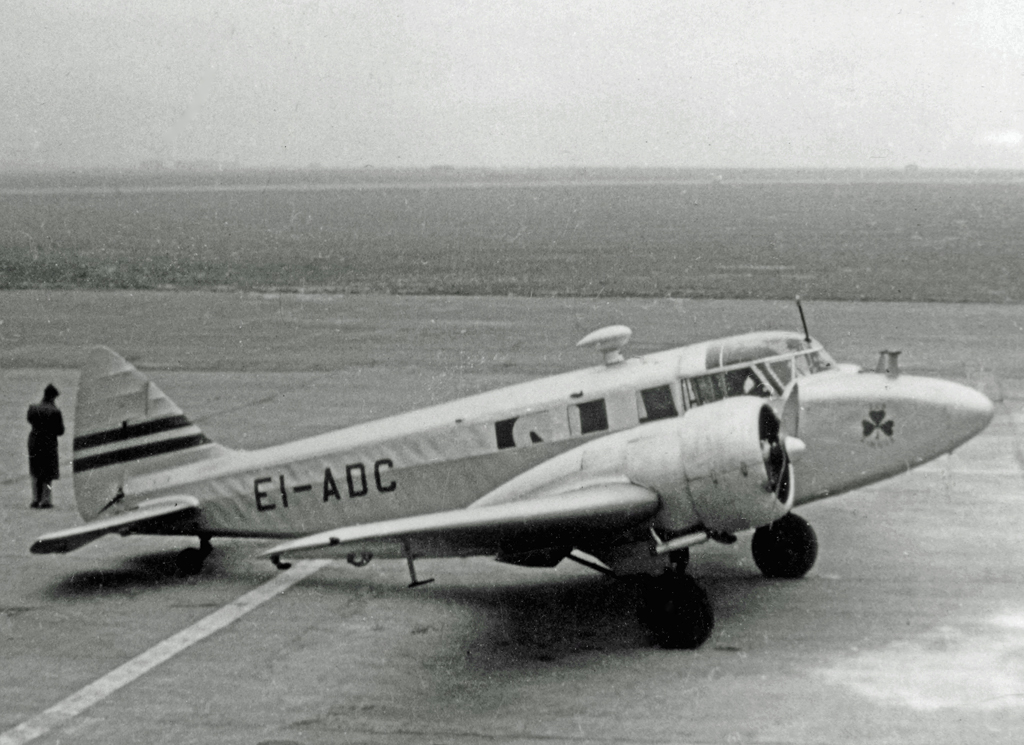
Airspeed Consul of Aer Lingus at Liverpool in 1949

The Consul saw service with numerous small scheduled and charter airlines as feeder liners in Great Britain, and also Belgium, Iceland, Ireland, Malta, East Africa and Canada, and was the first type operated by Malayan Airways, the predecessor of Singapore Airlines and Malaysia Airlines.

Various owners emerged for individual aircraft. A number were acquired for training purposes. Several Consuls were operated as executive transports by a number of large industrial companies.

However, the aircraft's wooden construction, heavy wartime use, somewhat tricky handling and small capacity typically counted against their long term use. Many of the 'civil' conversions were bought by military users; and the Consul served as a VIP transport with the air forces of Britain, Canada and New Zealand, all of whom already operated Oxfords. During 1949, the Israeli Air Force purchased a number of civil Consuls and re-converted them to military trainers. They were used by 141 Squadron until 1957, a year after the Oxford was retired by the Royal Air Force.

By 1960, there were at least nine Consuls known to be in operation worldwide. According to Taylor, it had a relatively good safety record, although the loss of five of the first ten Consuls was particularly unfortunant. Furthermore, the aircraft is believed to be Airspeed's only civil transport to achieve financial success.

While several Oxfords survive, the Consul has not been so fortunate. G-AIKR, a former children's playground attraction, is owned by the Canada Aviation Museum; it is on loan to the Royal New Zealand Air Force Museum, where it is being returned to Oxford status. As of 2003, Consul VR-SCD was known to exist in Singapore, stored in pieces.

== Operators ==
=== Civil operators ===
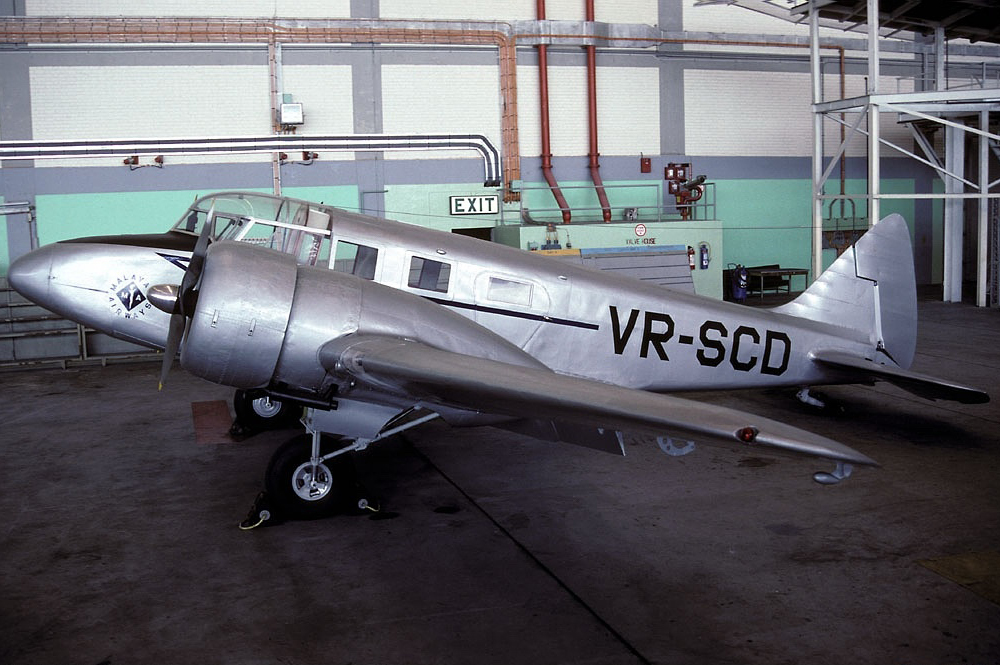
A Consul which has been cosmetically restored to represent an example previously operated by Malayan Airways and is now preserved in Singapore

- The aircraft was used by companies, individuals and air charter companies and the following:

Burma

- Union of Burma Airways – four aircraft delivered in 1947

Iceland

- Loftleidir – one aircraft delivered in January 1951, fatal crash in April 1951

India

- Airways (India) – two aircraft delivered in 1947

Ireland

- Aer Lingus – two aircraft delivered in 1947

Israel

- El Al – one delivered in 1953 for crew training.

Italy

- Soc Transports Aerei Mediterranei (STAM) – three aircraft delivered 1955–56

Jordan

- Arab Airways Association – one aircraft loaned in 1951
- Air Jordan – seven aircraft from 1950 to 1951

Malaya

- Malayan Airways – three aircraft delivered in 1947

Kenya

- East African Airways – one aircraft delivered in 1954

Malta

- Air Malta
- Malta Airways

South Africa

- Commercial Air Services – one aircraft delivered in 1949.
- Natal Airlines – four aircraft delivered in 1955.
- Silver Flight – one aircraft delivered in 1947.

Spain

- Iberia – three aircraft first delivery in 1952.

Sweden

- Aero Nord Sweden – one aircraft from Aeropropaganda in 1953.
- Aeropropaganda – two aircraft delivered 1950–51.
- Nordisk Air Transport – one aircraft delivered in 1951.
- Transair Sweden – one aircraft from Nordisk Air Transport in 1951.

Tanganyika

- United Air Services – three aircraft delivered 1947–48.

United Kingdom

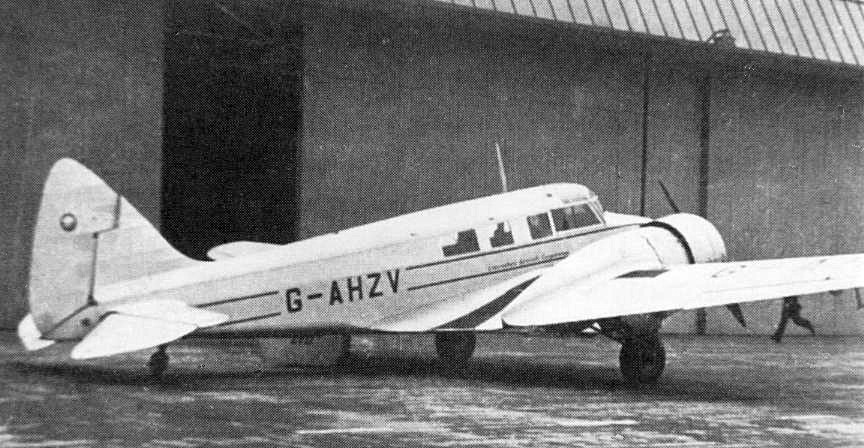
Airspeed Consul of Lancashire Aircraft Corporation at Manchester in 1950 on scheduled service to London (Northolt)

- Air Charter
- Air Enterprises – seven aircraft based at Croydon Airport.
- Air Kruise
- Airspan Travel
- Atlas Aviation – four aircraft based at Elstree.
- Britavia
- British Air Transport
- British Aviation Services – four aircraft based at Blackbushe Airport.
- British Overseas Airways Corporation (BOAC Training Flight)
- British South American Airways
- Cambrian Airways
- Chartair
- Guernsey Air Charter
- Hornton Airways – three aircraft based at Gatwick Airport.
- International Airways
- Lancashire Aircraft Corporation
- Mercury Air Services
- Ministry of Civil Aviation Flying Unit for radio aids calibration, trials and pilot testing.
- Ministry of Supply for engine trials by Alvis
- Morton Air Services
- Northern Air Charter
- Olley Air Services
- Patrick Laing Air Services
- Portsmouth Aviation
- Pullman Airways
- Silver City Airways
- Scottish Aviation
- Solar Air Services
- Southern Airways
- Stiener Air Services – six aircraft based at Speke Airport
- Transcontinental Air Services
- Transair Ltd – five aircraft based at Croydon Airport.
- Westminster Airways – seven aircraft based at Elstree.

United Nations

- Five aircraft leased to the United Nations Commission in Israel between 1947 and 1949.

=== Military operators ===
Argentina

- Argentine Air Force – ten aircraft delivered in 1947.

Belgian Congo

- Force publique – six aircraft delivered in 1949.

Burma

- Union of Burma Air Force – nine aircraft from 1949 to 1950.

Israel

- Israeli Defence Force Air Force – eleven aircraft from 1949 to 1959.

New Zealand

- Royal New Zealand Air Force – six conversions by De Havilland Aircraft of New Zealand in early 1950s.

Turkey

- Turkish Air Force – two VIP aircraft from 1946 used by the Transport Liaison Group.

== Accidents and incidents ==
- 29 April 1947 – G-AIOZ of Milburnair Limited crashed at Botley Hill, Limpsfield on approach to Croydon Airport, two killed.
- 27 February 1948 - G-AJGE, of Pullman Airways Limited, lost at sea in the Gulf of Sidra off North Africa during a charter flight from Nairobi to London. Five killed.
- 11 February 1949 – the first Consul conversion G-AGVY of Air Enterprises crashed at Jezzin, Lebanon while on charter to the United Nations, two onboard killed.
- 15 June 1950 – UB340 of the Union of Burma Air Force was on a demonstration flight when a rocket exploded under the wing killing the Burmese Chief of Air Staff.
- 12 April 1951 – TF-RPM of Flugferdir H/F crashed at Howden Moor, Yorkshire, England on a flight from Croydon to Iceland, three killed.
- 11 December 1951 – NZ1902 of the Royal New Zealand Air Force crashed on Mount Ruapehu.
- 14 June 1952 – G-AHFT of Morton Air Services ditched in the English Channel following an engine failure, six killed.

== Specifications ==
Data from British Civil Aircraft since 1919, Jane's All the World's Aircraft 1947

General characteristics

- Crew: 1
- Capacity: six passengers
- Length: 35 ft 4 in (10.77 m)
- Wingspan: 53 ft 4 in (16.26 m)
- Height: 10 ft 1.5 in (3.086 m)
- Wing area: 348 sq ft (32.3 m^{2})
- Empty weight: 6,047 lb (2,743 kg)
- Max takeoff weight: 8,250 lb (3,742 kg)
- Fuel capacity: 156 imp gal (187 US gal; 709 L) in 4 wing tanks; 17 imp gal (20 US gal; 77 L)
- Powerplant: 2 × Armstrong Siddeley Cheetah 10 seven cylinder air-cooled radial piston engines, 395 hp (295 kW) each at 2,425 rpm at 4,300 ft (1,311 m), with 2.25 psi (15.51 kPa) boost
- Propellers: 2-bladed Fairey-Reed fixed-pitch metal propellers

Performance

- Maximum speed: 190 mph (310 km/h, 170 kn) at 4,800 ft (1,463 m)
- Cruise speed: 163 mph (262 km/h, 142 kn) maximum weak mixture
- Stall speed: 64 mph (103 km/h, 56 kn)
- Range: 900 mi (1,400 km, 780 nmi)
- Service ceiling: 19,000 ft (5,800 m)
- Rate of climb: 1,070 ft/min (5.4 m/s) at sea level
- Time to altitude: 10,000 ft (3,048 m) in 10 minutes
- Wing loading: 23.1 lb/sq ft (113 kg/m^{2})
- Power/mass: 0.096 hp/lb (0.158 kW/kg)
- Fuel consumption: < 30 imp gal/h (36 gal/h; 136 L/h)
- Take-off distance to 66 ft (20 m): 1,725 ft (526 m) in 5 mph (4 kn; 8 km/h) wind
- Landing run: 825 ft (251 m)

Avionics

- Standard Telephones STR11/16
or
- STR 9 radio
- Decca Navigator (optional)

== See also ==
Related development

- Airspeed AS.6 Envoy
- Airspeed AS.8 Viceroy (one-off racing special)
- Airspeed Oxford

Aircraft of comparable role, configuration, and era

- Avro Anson
