= 1934 London, Scottish & Provincial Airways Airspeed Courier crash =

1934 crash caused by pilot error

Coordinates: 51°20′32″N 0°10′30″E

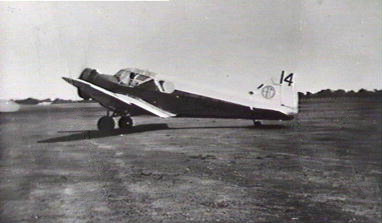
- An Airspeed Courier, similar to the accident aircraft.

Accident
- Date: 29 September 1934.
- Summary: Pilot error (loss of control due to disorientation in cloud)
- Site: Timberden Bottom, Shoreham, Kent, United Kingdom.

Aircraft
- Aircraft type: Airspeed Courier.
- Operator: London, Scottish & Provincial Airways Ltd.
- Registration: G-ACSY
- Flight origin: Heston Aerodrome, Middlesex, United Kingdom.
- Destination: Le Bourget Airport, Paris France.
- Passengers: 3
- Crew: 1
- Fatalities: 4
- Injuries: 2 (on ground)
- Survivors: 0

On 29 September 1934, an Airspeed Courier of London, Scottish & Provincial Airways Ltd crashed just north of Shoreham, Kent. The aircraft was on a scheduled international passenger flight from Heston Aerodrome west of London to Le Bourget Airport, Paris. All four people on board were killed. Two people were injured by flying debris.

== Aircraft ==
The accident aircraft was Airspeed Courier G-ACSY, c/n 16. The aircraft had been registered on 17 May 1934, The aircraft was on loan from Airspeed.

== Accident ==
The aircraft took off from Hounslow Aerodrome at around 17:00 on a scheduled international passenger flight to Le Bourget Airport, Paris France. It flew into an isolated storm over north west Kent. An eyewitness reported seeing the aircraft emerge from the clouds in a vertical dive. The cloudbase was at an altitude of 1,200 feet (370 m) and the hills around Shoreham reached an elevation of 600 feet (180 m). The aircraft crashed just north of Shoreham in Timberden Bottom, at the bottom of Cockerhurst Road. All four people on board were killed, Two women walking in the vicinity of the accident were injured when they were struck by flying debris. Some parts of the aircraft were found 66 feet (20 m) to the south west and 100 feet (30 m) west of the main wreckage. An eyewitness stated that he thought the pilot may have stalled trying to avoid high tension power lines.

An inquest into the accident was held at Sevenoaks on 2 October. The victims were identified by documentation and personal belongings as they had received injuries which made visual identification "extremely difficult, if not impossible". Evidence was given that the aircraft was not operating anywhere near its maximum take-off weight of 4,000 pounds (1,800 kg) and that it had been airworthy on departure from Heston. The pilot, Ronald Smith (26) from Ealing, was an experienced former Royal Air Force pilot. He had 1,500 hours flying time, of which 150 hours were on the Heston-Paris route.

A memorial cross was installed near the crash site on Cockerhurst Road but after it was vandalised it was removed to Shoreham churchyard, by the north west corner of the tower.

== Sources ==
- Ingleton, Roy (2010). Kent Disasters. Barnsley: Pen & Sword. ISBN 978-1-84563-116-1.
