= Cobham Air Routes =

British airline

Cobham Air Routes was a 1930s British airline formed in 1935 to operate a service between Croydon and the Channel Islands. Following the loss of an aircraft in a fatal accident the airline was sold to Olley Air Service.

== History ==
Cobham Air Routes Limited was formed on 3 May 1935 by Sir Alan Cobham to operate services between Croydon and Guernsey. The twice daily service started on 6 May 1935. The first sector from Croydon to Bournemouth via Portsmouth was flown by an Airspeed Courier with the Bournemouth to Guernsey sector flown by a six-passenger Westland Wessex. Following the loss of the Wessex aircraft on 3 July 1935, Cobham decided to withdraw from the airline business and sell the company to Channel Air Ferries.

== Accidents and incidents ==
- On 3 July 1935 the three-engined Westland Wessex G-ADEW ditched in the English Channel close to The Needles with the loss of the pilot; the passenger managed to escape. The aircraft was carrying one passenger from Guernsey to Bournemouth; it had a failure of the starboard engine 25 to 30 minutes into the flight and carried on with two engines. After half an hour, one or more of the remaining engines failed, and the aircraft crashed into the sea. The passenger was picked up after two hours by the Stanmore but the pilot was never found. An inquiry concluded that the pilot had taken an unnecessary but not wholly unjustifiable risk continuing with two engines, and he should have considered turning for the French coast.

== Fleet ==
- Airspeed Courier
- Airspeed Envoy
- Westland Wessex (3)

== Guernsey Post Office ==
In 1973 the Guernsey Post Office issued a 3p stamp depicting the Wessex G-ADEW to represent the three aircraft used by Cobham on services to the island, to commemorate 50 years of commercial flying to the island.

== See also ==
- List of defunct airlines of the United Kingdom
