= Airspeed Queen Wasp =

British pilotless target aircraft

AS.30 Queen Wasp
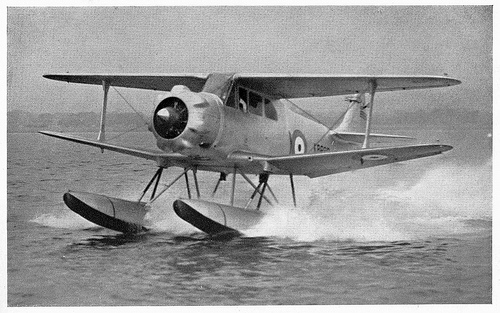
- Airspeed Queen Wasp, c. 1939

General information
- Type: Pilotless target aircraft
- Manufacturer: Airspeed (1934) Ltd
- Designer: Hessell Tiltman/N.S. Norway
- Primary user: Royal Air Force
- Number built: 7

History
- Manufactured: 1937-1940
- Introduction date: 1937
- First flight: 11 June 1937

The Airspeed AS.30 Queen Wasp was a British pilotless target aircraft built by Airspeed Limited at Portsmouth during the Second World War. Although intended for both Royal Air Force and Royal Navy use, the aircraft never went into series production.

== Design and development ==
The Queen Wasp was built to meet an Air Ministry Specification Q.32/35 for a pilotless target aircraft to replace the de Havilland Tiger Moth based de Havilland Queen Bee. Two prototypes were ordered in May 1936, one to have a wheeled landing gear for use by the Royal Air Force and the other as a floatplane for Royal Navy use for air-firing practice at sea. Powered by the Armstrong Siddeley Cheetah engine, a total of 65 aircraft were ordered, contingent on the success of the flight test programme.

The aircraft was a single-engined biplane constructed of wood with sharply-tapered wings and fabric-covered control surfaces. An enclosed cabin with one seat was provided so the Queen Wasp could be flown manually with the radio control system turned off. The radio control system was complex with a number of backup safety devices to ensure radio and battery operation was uninterrupted. A trailing receiver aerial was winched out after takeoff and served as an automatic landing device which was activated when the trailing aerial weight hit the runway. The sensitivity of the system in turbulent weather meant that an alternative landing signal was used to initiate a landing procedure.

The landplane first flew on 11 June 1937, and the floatplane on 19 October 1937. The floatplane was successfully catapulted from HMS Pegasus in November 1937.

== Operational history ==
In flight tests, the aircraft was found to be underpowered and water handling difficulties necessitated a redesign of the floats by their manufacturer, Short Brothers. Although the production run of 10 aircraft was begun (P5441–P5450), only three more aircraft were completed and delivered to the Royal Air Force.

Airspeed proposed a number of unsuccessful designs derived from the Queen Wasp including the AS.38 communications aircraft and the AS.50 trainer developed to meet Specification T.24/40.

== Operators ==
United Kingdom

- Royal Air Force
- Royal Navy

== Specifications (AS.30 Landplane) ==
Data from Airspeed Aircraft since 1931

General characteristics

- Crew: 1 (optional)
- Length: 23 ft 4 in (7.11 m)
- Wingspan: 31 ft 0 in (9.45 m)
- Width: 12 ft 0 in (3.66 m) wings folded
- Height: 10 ft 1 in (3.07 m)
- Gross weight: 3,500 lb (1,588 kg)
- Powerplant: 1 × Armstrong Siddeley Cheetah IX 7-cylinder air-cooled radial piston engine, 350 hp (260 kW)
- Propellers: 2-bladed

Performance

- Maximum speed: 172 mph (277 km/h, 149 kn) at 8,000 ft (2,400 m)
- Cruise speed: 151 mph (243 km/h, 131 kn) at 10,000 ft (3,000 m)
- Service ceiling: 20,000 ft (6,100 m)

== See also ==
Aircraft of comparable role, configuration, and era

- Culver Cadet

Related lists

- List of aircraft of the RAF
