= Airspeed Tern =

British single-seat glider, 1931

AS.1 Tern

General information
- Type: Sailplane
- National origin: United Kingdom
- Manufacturer: Airspeed Limited
- Designer: Hessell Tiltman & Nevil Shute Norway
- Number built: 2

History
- Introduction date: 1931
- First flight: 1931

The Airspeed AS.1 Tern was a 1930s British glider aircraft, the first aircraft built by Airspeed Limited at York and one of the earliest British-designed gliders.

== Development ==
The Tern was designed by Hessell Tiltman & Nevil Shute Norway to gain records and publicity for the new Airspeed company, as well as to attract orders for new aircraft. Designed for hill- and cloud-soaring, the Tern was a wood-and-fabric cantilever monoplane. It was designed to be dismantled and was advertised for sale at £248. Only two examples were built. Shute himself was the pilot on the Tern's first test flight.

On 24 August 1931 the Tern was flown by Carli Magersuppe from Stoupe Brow, Ravenscar to Scarborough to gain the first British distance record of 8.3 miles (13.4 km). The glider flew a total of 16 miles (26 km) but only the straight-line distance counted towards the record.

The Tern was constructed of wood with a fabric-covered two-spar cantilevered tapered wing with no dihedral. A plywood leading edge was fitted but only as an aerodynamic fairing and not as primary structure. The trapezoidal-section fuselage had plywood lower sides and fabric-covered top decking as well as a generous cockpit in the leading edge of the centre-section.

The Tern had some success in establishing gliding records but only one was completed and parts for one more were produced. After languishing through the Second World War the Tern was re-built, using parts from both airframes, but did little flying.

== Specifications ==
Data from Sailplane and Glider

General characteristics

- Crew: 1
- Length: 24 ft 7 in (7.49 m)
- Wingspan: 50 ft 0 in (15.24 m)
- Wing area: 201 sq ft (18.7 m^{2})
- Aspect ratio: 12.44
- Empty weight: 223 lb (101 kg)
- Gross weight: 415 lb (188.24 kg)

Performance

- Maximum speed: 70 mph (112 km/h, 60 kn) (launch / tow)
- Cruise speed: 40 mph (65 km/h, 35 kn)
- Stall speed: 25 mph (40 km/h, 22 kn)
- Lift-to-drag: 25 (theoretical)
- Wing loading: 2.06 lb/sq ft (10.05 kg/m^{2})
