= Alan Cobham =

English aviation pioneer (1894–1973)

Sir Alan Cobham KBE, AFC
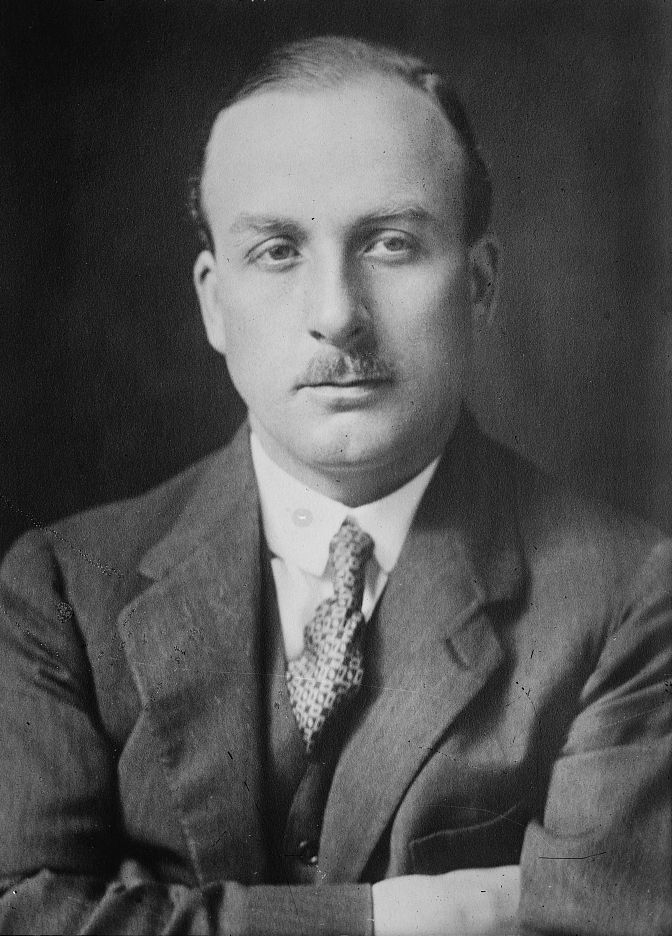
- Born: Alan John Cobham; 6 May 1894; London, England
- Died: 21 October 1973 (aged 79); Bournemouth, Dorset, England
- Education: Wilson's School
- Occupation: Aviator

Sir Alan John Cobham, KBE, AFC (6 May 1894 – 21 October 1973) was an English aviation pioneer.

== Early life ==
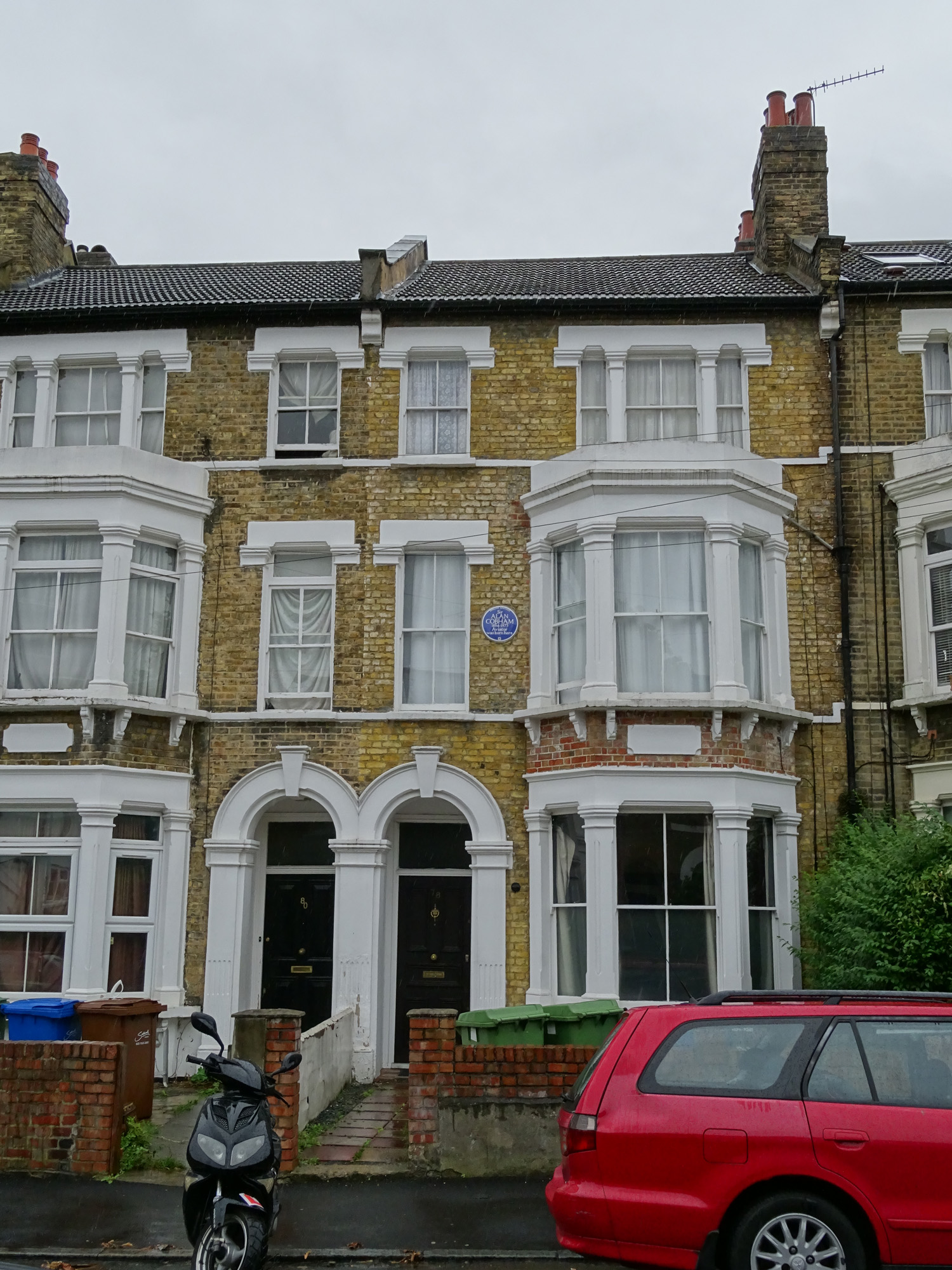
Sir Alan Cobham's place of birth at 78 Denman Road, London

Cobham was born at 78 Denman Road, in Camberwell, London. As a child he attended Wilson's School, which was then stood in Camberwell. The school was relocated to the former site of Croydon Airport in 1975.

== Career ==
=== Early Career and First World War ===
Alan Cobham began work as a teenage commercial apprentice in the City of London. He enjoyed the outdoors, and after completing his apprenticeship spent a year working on his uncle's farm, hoping to make a career in estate management. After a brief return to London commercial work, in August 1914 he joined the British Army, and was directed to the Royal Army Veterinary Corps due to his farming experience. He served on the Western Front from 1914 to 1917. He dealt mainly with injured horses, and attained the rank of Staff Veterinary Sergeant. After transfer to the Royal Flying Corps and then the Royal Air Force, he became a Pilot Officer flying instructor.

=== Test pilot and air tours ===
After the war Cobham became a test pilot for the de Havilland aircraft company, and was the first pilot for the newly formed de Havilland Aeroplane Hire Service. In 1921 he made a 5,000-mile air tour of Europe, visiting 17 cities in three weeks. Between 16 November 1925 and 13 March 1926, he made a trip from London to Cape Town and return in his de Havilland DH.50, in which he had replaced the original Siddeley Puma engine with a more powerful, air-cooled Jaguar. On 30 June 1926, he set off on a flight from Britain (from the River Medway) to Australia, where 60,000 people swarmed across the grassy fields of Essendon Airport, Melbourne, when he landed his de Havilland DH.50 floatplane (it had been converted to a wheeled undercarriage earlier, at Darwin). During the flight to Australia, Cobham's engineer of the D.H.50 aircraft, Arthur B. Elliot, was shot and killed after they left Baghdad on 5 July 1926. The return flight was undertaken over the same route. Cobham was knighted the same year.

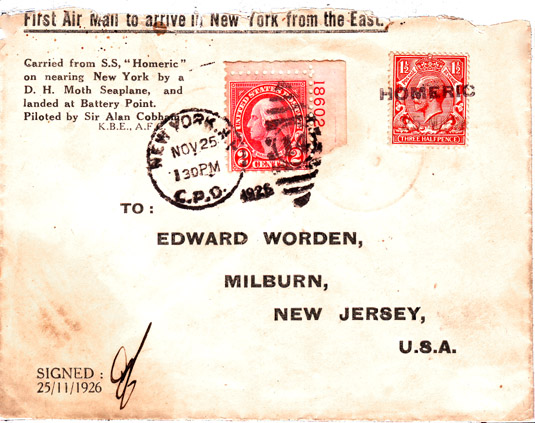
Cover Sir Alan Cobham had attempted to fly to New York from the RMS Homeric.

On 25 November 1926, Cobham attempted but failed to be the first person to deliver mail to New York City by air from the east, planning to fly mail from the White Star ocean liner RMS Homeric in a de Havilland DH.60 Moth floatplane when the ship was about 12 hours from New York harbour on a westbound crossing from Southampton. After the Moth was lowered from the ship, however, Cobham was unable to take off owing to rough water and had to be towed into port by the ship. The same year Cobham was awarded the gold medal by the Fédération Aéronautique Internationale.

Cobham starred as himself in the 1927 British war film The Flight Commander directed by Maurice Elvey. In 1927–28 he flew a Short Singapore flying boat around the continent of Africa landing only in British territory. Cobham wrote his own contemporary accounts of his flights, and recalls them in his biography. The films With Cobham to the Cape (1926), Round Africa with Cobham (1928) and With Cobham to Kivu (1932) contain valuable footage of the flights. Recent commentaries contextualize his flights across the British Empire in the wider events and culture of the time.

In 1929 Cobham mounted his first tour of Britain, called the Municipal Aerodrome Campaign. This was an ambitious plan to encourage town councils to build local airports in the hope of drumming up business for his activities as an aviation consultant. Each event would start with free flights to local dignitaries followed by free flights for local schoolchildren, the latter funded by Sir Charles Wakefield, the founder of Castrol, who paid the fares for ten thousand such flights. The day would finish with as many paid-for pleasure flights as could be managed for the public, the income from which would pay his expenses and make him a profit. The tour visited 110 venues between May and October 1929 using a ten-passenger de Havilland DH.61 Giant Moth G-AAEV named Youth of Britain. Cobham declared the tour to have been a great success.

=== Aviation displays ===
In 1932 he started the National Aviation Day displays – a combination of barnstorming and joyriding. This consisted of a team of up to fourteen aircraft, ranging from single-seaters to modern airliners, and many skilled pilots. It toured the country, calling at hundreds of sites, some of them regular airfields and some just fields cleared for the occasion. Generally known as "Cobham's Flying Circus", it was hugely popular, giving thousands of people their first experience of flying, and bringing "air-mindedness" to the population. In 1933 there were two simultaneous tours throughout the season, named Number 1 and Number 2. In 1935 there again were two, but only from 1 July, named Astra and Ferry. These continued until the end of the 1935 season. In the British winter of 1932–33, Cobham took his aerial circus to South Africa (with the mistaken view that it would be the first of its kind there). He closed the circus within weeks of a mid-air disaster in which two of his planes collided over Blackpool on 7 September 1935. The pilot of an Avro biplane, South African war veteran, Captain Hugh P Stewart and Blackpool sisters, Lilian and Doris Barnes were killed.

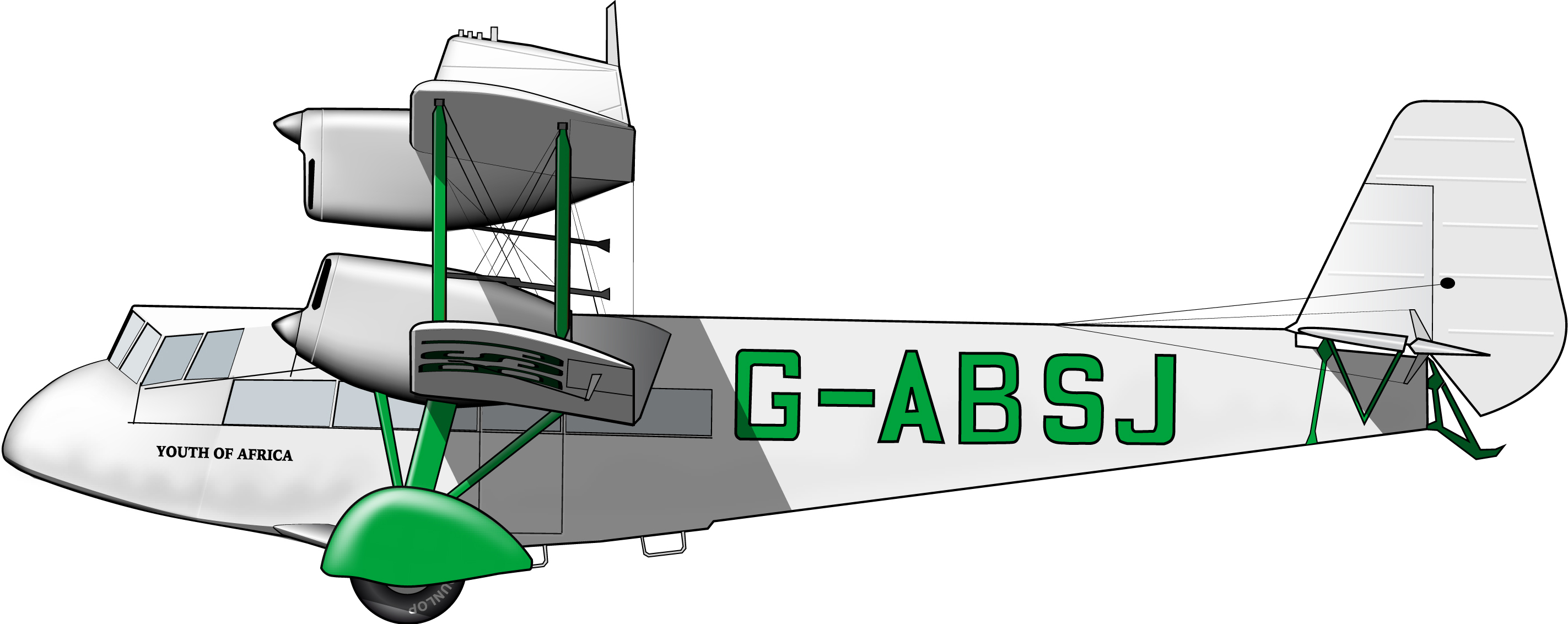
Airspeed Ferry G-ABSJ was used in the National Aviation Day tours, named Youth of Britain III, later Youth of Africa.

=== Business ventures ===
Cobham was one of the founding directors, of Airspeed Ltd., the aircraft manufacturing company started by Nevil Shute Norway and Hessell Tiltman. Tiltman had been discharged by the Airship Guarantee Company (a subsidiary of Vickers) after the R101 disaster also caused the grounding of the more successful R100. Cobham was an early and enthusiastic recruit. His early orders for two "Off Plan" Airspeed Ferrys for his National Aviation Day Limited company, were a major boost to the fledgling company.

Cobham's early experiments with in-flight refuelling were based on a specially adapted Airspeed Courier. This craft was eventually modified by Airspeed to Cobham's specification, for a non-stop flight from London to India, using in-flight refuelling to extend the aeroplane's flight duration.

In 1935 he founded a small airline, Cobham Air Routes Ltd, that flew from London Croydon Airport to the Channel Islands. Months later, after a crash that killed one of his pilots, he sold it to Olley Air Service Ltd and turned to the development of inflight refueling. Trials stopped at the outbreak of World War II until interest was successfully revived by the RAF and United States Army Air Forces in the last year of the war.

He once remarked: "It's a full time job being Alan Cobham!"

== Personal life ==
In the summer of 1922 he married Gladys Lloyd, and they subsequently had two sons; Geoffrey (b.1925) and Michael (b.1927). After National Service and a short career at the Bar, Michael Cobham followed him into the Flight Refuelling business, and for many years was in charge of it.

Lady Cobham died in 1961 at the age of 63.

Cobham retired to the British Virgin Islands, but returned to England, where he died in 1973.

== Legacy ==
In 1997, Cobham was inducted into the International Air & Space Hall of Fame at the San Diego Air & Space Museum.

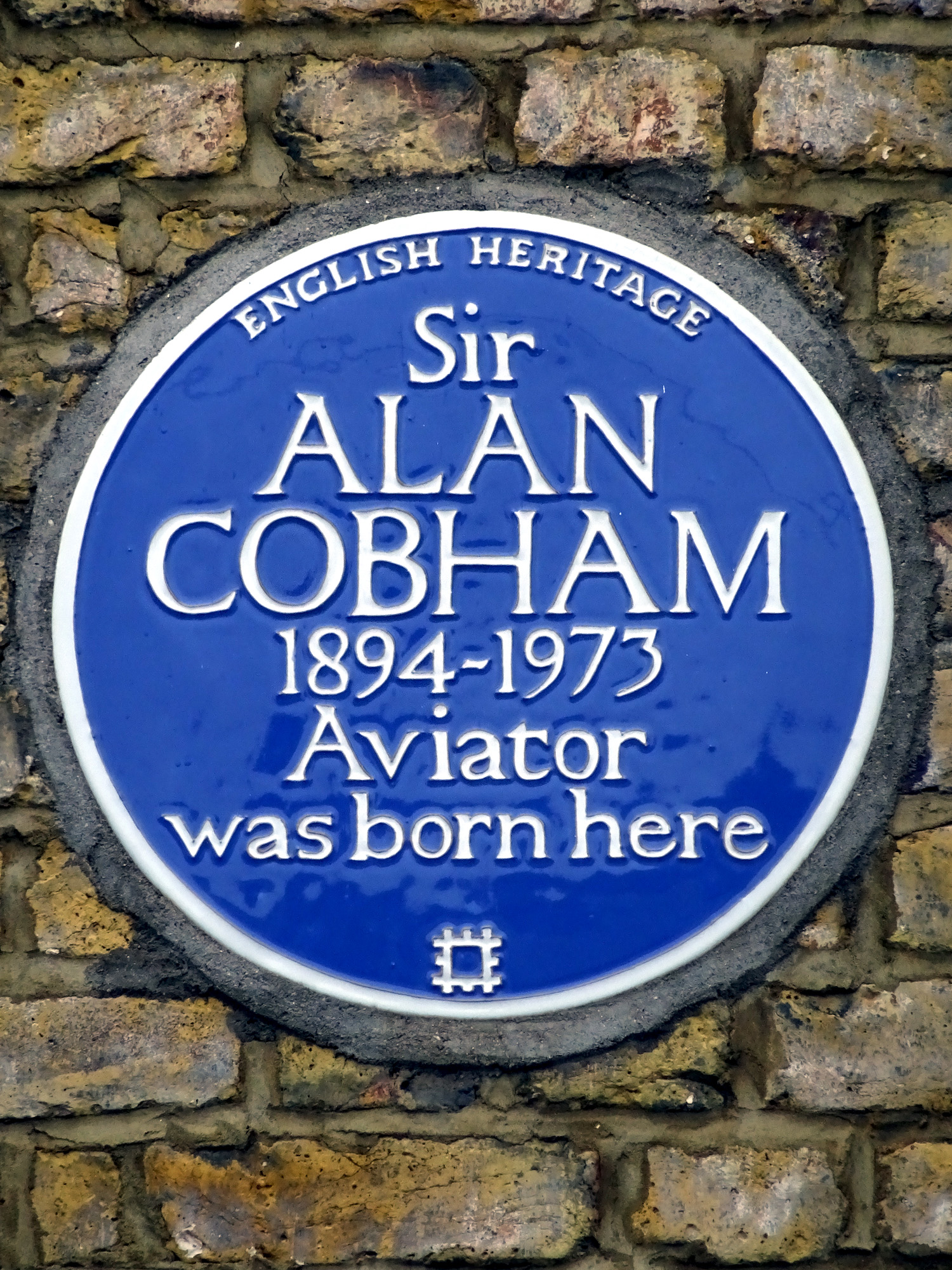
The blue plaque at Cobham's birthplace in Camberwell

In 2003, a blue plaque commemorating Cobham was installed at his place of birth in Camberwell, London.

In 2015 the Royal Air Force Museum in London staged an exhibition about Cobham. In 2016 the RAF exhibited his Flying Circus.

In 2016 he was inducted into the Airlift/Tanker Association Hall of Fame.

The company he formed is still active in the aviation industry as Cobham plc.

== See also ==
- Aerofilms, the UK's first commercial aerial photography company.
- Richard Haine alumnus of the Flying Circus
- Round the Bend, the novel by Nevil Shute, features Cobham's National Aviation Day flying circus as an integral part of the plot. The principal character Tom Cutter is said to have been modelled upon one of Cobham's pilots, Martin Hearn, who was a pioneer of wing walking stunts and who later ran his own aircraft assembly plant at Hooton Park in Cheshire.
- Philip Stenning, hero of Shute's Marazan, is a character modelled upon Cobham and others.
