= Airspeed Ltd. =

British aircraft manufacturer, 1931–1951

Airspeed
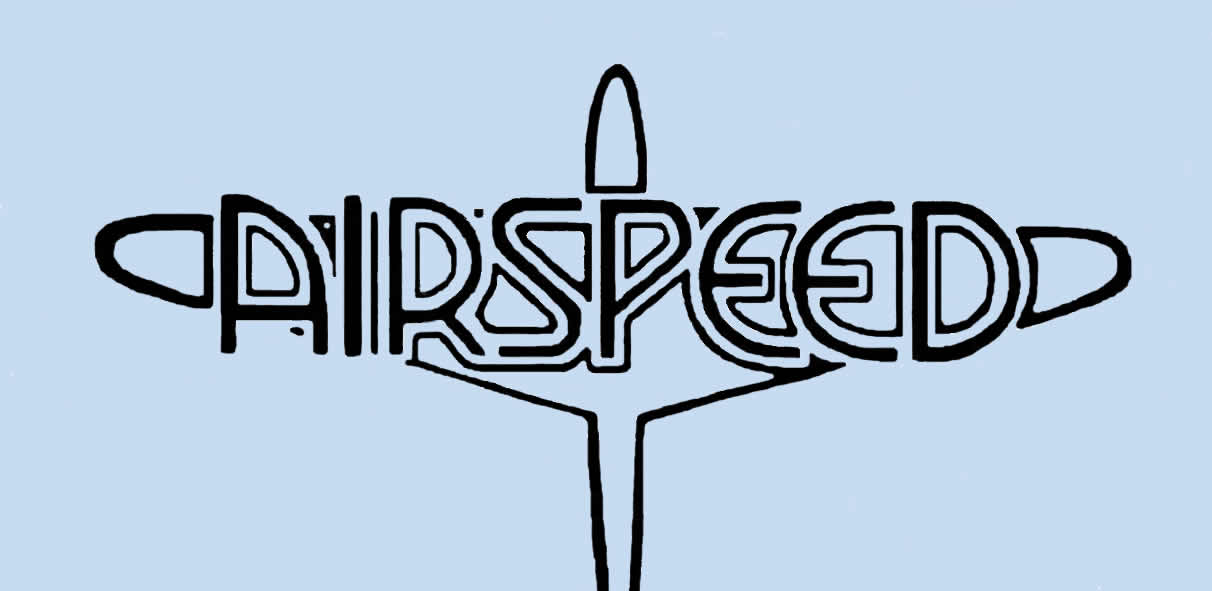
- Type: Private Ltd
- Industry: Aeronautical engineering
- Founded: 1931
- Defunct: 1951
- Fate: Merged
- Successor: de Havilland
- Headquarters: Founded in York, England moved to Portsmouth, England.
- Key people: A.H. Tiltman; Nevil Shute Norway
- Products: Aircraft
- Parent: de Havilland (1940–1951)

Airspeed Limited was established in 1931 to build aeroplanes in York, England, by A. H. Tiltman and Nevil Shute Norway (the aeronautical engineer and novelist, who used his forenames as his pen-name). The other directors were A. E. Hewitt, Lord Grimthorpe and Alan Cobham. Amy Johnson was also one of the initial subscribers for shares.

== Foundation ==
Airspeed Ltd. was founded by Nevil Shute Norway (later to become a novelist as Nevil Shute) and designer Hessell Tiltman. In his autobiography, Slide Rule: Autobiography of an Engineer, Norway gives an account of the founding of the company and of the processes that led to the development and mass production of the Airspeed Oxford. He received the Fellowship of the Royal Aeronautical Society for his innovative fitting of a retractable undercarriage to an aircraft.

== Early operations ==
The AS.1 Tern, the first British high-performance glider (sailplane), was built to get publicity and attract more capital by setting British gliding records. A glider could be designed and built in two or three months while the design office and workshop were being set up in half of an empty bus garage on Piccadilly in York. Shute flew the Tern's first test flight.

In 1932 Airspeed produced the AS.4 Ferry, a three-engined, ten-passenger biplane designed specifically for Sir Alan Cobham.

In March 1933 the firm moved to Portsmouth where the City Council gave generous terms for a factory building constructed to Airspeed's requirements at the local airport. The first Airspeed Courier was flown from there in 1933, followed by the first of a twin-engined development of the Courier, the Airspeed Envoy, in 1934. Both the Courier and the Envoy were made in small numbers. In the same year, a long-range racing version of the Envoy, the AS.8 Viceroy, was developed for the England-Australia MacRobertson Air Race.

In August 1934, Airspeed (1934) Limited made a public issue of shares, in association with the Tyneside ship builder Swan Hunter & Wigham Richardson Limited.

In 1934 six Couriers had been sold to an operating company for a hire purchase deposit of £5 each. Nevil Shute Norway wrote that they could come back to Airspeed and as an "obsolescent type" might not be so easy to sell again. He got a reputation as being "unscrupulous" for resisting the auditors' attempt to write them down on the books because, with growing talk of war, civil aircraft of any size would sell immediately. As the six were worth nearly twenty thousand pounds, writing them down to half that would add £10,000 to their loss, making the firm's proposed share issue a very unattractive investment. Shute could see from his office the four hundred workers in the workshop with families depending on them. In 1936 most of the unsold Couriers and Envoys were sold and found their way to the Spanish Civil War. The demonstration Envoy was sold to the Spanish Nationalists for £6000, paid for in cash. In 1935, the sole Airspeed Viceroy was nearly sold to Ethiopia for use against Italian forces.

In 1934 Shute negotiated a licensing agreement with Fokker. In 1935, Airspeed signed a manufacturing licensing agreement for the Douglas DC-2 and several Fokker types, with Fokker to be a consultant for seven years. Airspeed considered making the Fokker D.XVII fighter for Greece, which wanted to buy from Britain for currency reasons. Shute and a Fokker representative "who was well accustomed to methods of business in the Balkans", spent three weeks in Athens but did not close the deal. After a year, the drift to war, and their Air Ministry contracts, meant that the Dutch could not go to the Airspeed factory or attend board meetings.

== Wolseley engine ==
All Airspeed aeroplanes under manufacture or development in 1936 were to use the Wolseley Scorpio, a radial engine of about 250 horsepower (190 kW) which was under development by Nuffield. The project was abandoned in September 1936 after the expenditure of about two hundred thousand pounds when Lord Nuffield got the fixed price I.T.P. (Intention to Proceed) contract papers, which would have required re-orientation of their offices with an army of chartered accountants, and decided to deal only with the War Office and the Admiralty, not the Air Ministry.

Norway thought that it was a very advanced engine at a low price, so its loss was a major disaster for Airspeed.

== Second World War ==
In June 1940, it was formally announced that de Havilland had completed negotiations for the purchase from Swan, Hunter and Wigham Richardson, Ltd., of their holding of Airspeed ordinary shares. Airspeed retained its identity as a separate company, but was a wholly owned subsidiary of de Havilland.

Around 1943, to reduce the risk from Luftwaffe bombing, a new dispersed design office was opened at Fairmile Manor in Cobham, Surrey. Little is known of that establishment and nothing survives there today.

Airspeed's most productive period was during the war. The AS.10 Oxford had a production run exceeding 8,500. 3,800 AS51, and AS58 Horsa military gliders were built for the Royal Air Force and its allies. Many of them were used during the D-Day landings, and later for Operation Market Garden.

== Postwar operations ==
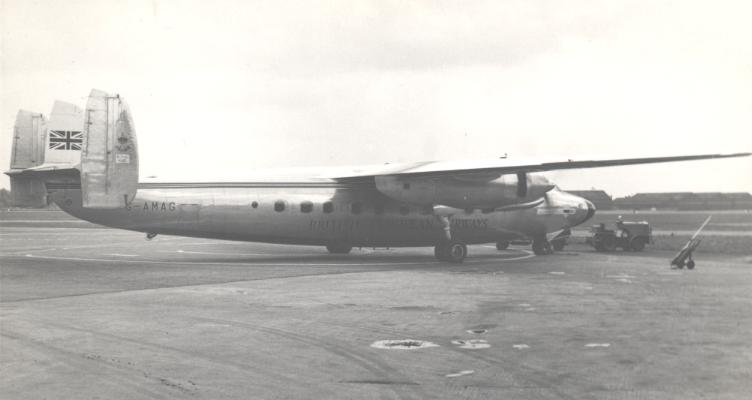
Airspeed Ambassador in service with British European Airways in 1953

The company reverted to the company name of Airspeed Limited on 25 January 1944. Postwar it converted over 150 surplus ex-RAF Oxford aircraft as AS65 Consuls for the commercial market. Airspeed went on to produce the superbly streamlined pressurised twin-engined piston airliner called the AS57 Ambassador. This served successfully for some years with British European Airways as their "Elizabethan Class". In 1951 Airspeed Limited was fully merged with de Havilland who then cancelled further development of the Ambassador, although the Ambassador fleet continued in service with smaller airlines such as Dan-Air until 1971. The original York factory was demolished in November 2015.

== Aircraft ==
- AS.1 Tern – (1931)

Glider (sailplane); built to get publicity by breaking British gliding records (Two built; plus parts for third, which were sold)

- AS.4 Ferry – (5 April 1932)

Three-engine biplane transport aircraft, four built

- AS.5 Courier – (1 April 1933)

Single-engine low-wing monoplane passenger transport with retractable undercarriage of conventional configuration, 16 built

- AS.6 Envoy – (26 June 1934)

Two-engine development of the Courier, 60 built

- AS.8 Viceroy – (August 1934)

Variant of Envoy, adapted for long-range flight. One aircraft was built

- AS.10 Oxford – (19 June 1937)

Larger two-engine development of Envoy, built in large numbers in the Second World War.

- AS.16

Projected licence production of Fokker F.XXII, none built.

- AS.20

Projected licence production of Fokker F.XXXVI, none built.

- AS.22

Projected licence production of Fokker C.X, none built.

- AS.30 Queen Wasp – (11 June 1937)

Single-engine single-seat biplane target drone aircraft, seven built.

- AS.39 Fleet Shadower – (18 October 1940)

Four-engine high-wing monoplane maritime patrol aircraft prototype. Two aircraft were ordered; one was completed

- AS.45 Cambridge – (19 February 1941)

Single-engine two-seater low-wing monoplane trainer aircraft with retractable undercarriage of conventional configuration. Two aircraft were built

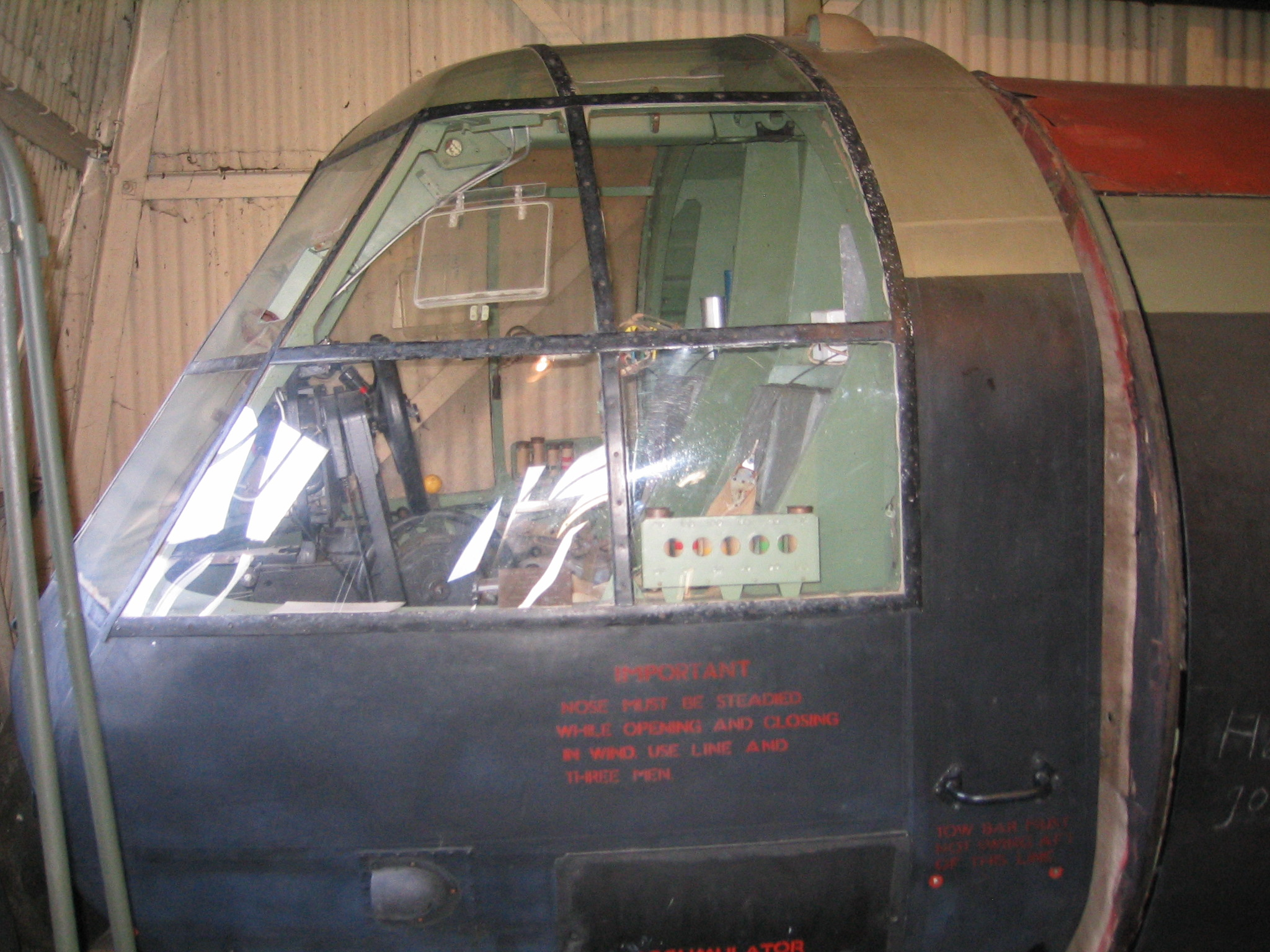
Airspeed Horsa cockpit

- AS.51 Horsa I – (12 September 1941)

Large troop-carrying glider; 2,245 built including seven prototypes.

- AS.57 Ambassador – (10 July 1947)

Two-engine high-wing piston engine airliner, 23 built

- AS.58 Horsa II –

Variant of Horsa with openable nose section for front loading; 1,561 built.

- AS.65 Consul – (March 1946)

Civilian conversion of wartime Oxford; 161 were converted in 1946-48.

== Bibliography ==
- Jackson, A. J. (1987). British Civil Aircraft since 1919. Vol. I (reprint with corrections ed.). London: Putnam. ISBN 0-85177-808-9.
- Norway, Nevil Shute (1954). Slide Rule: The Autobiography of an Engineer. London: William Heinemann. OCLC 841078868. "Norway's biography covers his time at Airspeed in great detail"
- Phipp, Mike (2007). The Brabazon Committee and British Airliners 1945–1960. Stroud: Tempus. ISBN 978-0-7524-4374-4.
