= Airspeed Ferry =

British airliner designed for pleasure flights

AS.4 Ferry
- G-ABSI, the first Airspeed Ferry, in flight.

General information
- Type: Ten-Passenger Airliner
- Manufacturer: Airspeed Limited
- Designer: N.S. Norway/A. H. Tiltman
- Number built: Four

History
- Introduction date: 1932
- First flight: 5 April 1932
- Retired: Late 1941

The Airspeed AS.4 Ferry was three-engined ten-seat biplane airliner designed and built by the British aircraft manufacturer Airspeed Limited. It was the company's first powered aircraft to be produced.

It was proposed for development in April 1931, shortly following Airspeed's founding. The Ferry was designed specifically for Alan Cobham's National Aviation Day events, performing 'air-experience' flights for the general public. On 5 April 1932, the prototype performed its maiden flight. Only four examples were produced at the company's facilities in York during the early 1930s. Two aircraft served with the Royal Air Force during the opening years of the Second World War, although largely being used as instructional airframes.

== Development ==
The origins of the Airspeed Ferry can be traced back to the company's first post-formation board meeting, held on 17 April 1931. Aviation innovator and Airspeed director Sir Alan Cobham sought a compact multi-engined airliner to perform 'air-experience' flights in Cobham's National Aviation Day displays. Amongst the requirements for such an aircraft was an extraordinary short takeoff and landing (STOL) capability for the era due to the austere airstrips common at the time, which were often little more than fields. During June of that same year, an initial order for a pair of aircraft, each being priced at £5,195 and for delivery ten months later, was placed with Airspeed.

Both the design and construction work were undertaken at Airspeed's York facilities. Work proceeded to schedule, with the prototype being conveyed to Sherburn-in-Elmet Aerodrome in March 1932 ahead of the type's maiden flight. To avoid the time and cost involved in its dismantling and reassembly, the prototype was instead towed in a completed state to the aerodrome, despite the risks and challenges involved, leading to the aircraft being escorted by local police.

On 5 April 1932, the first aircraft, G-ABSI Youth of Britain II, performed its maiden flight, piloted by H. V. Warrall. According to the aviation author H. A. Taylor, there were only two serious faults identified during this initial 19-minute flight, these being a marginally overbalanced rudder and the weight distribution being offset towards the nose, both being quickly remedied. The prototype was determined to be within envisioned limits, including its weight, thus it was loaded to its maximum gross weight of 5,400 lb (2,400 kg) and flown three days later. This time, its takeoff performance was less than had been hoped, thus it was refitted with finer-pitch propellers that improved its takeoff and climb performance when it flew again one day later. The certification process, which took four days to complete, revealed minor matters with the exhaust manifold as well as a sheared bolt on the undercarriage.

== Design ==
The Airspeed AS.4 Ferry was an unusual biplane airliner designed around the needs of Alan Cobham, one of the company's directors. It featured an unorthodox configuration, particularly the mounting of its third engine in the centre section of the upper wing, an arrangement which was principally adopted to provide the pilot with superior external visibility, although it also presented some aerodynamic benefits as well. The three engines installed upon the Ferry consisted of a pair of de Havilland Gipsy IIs mounted upon the upper surface of the lower wing, while the engine installed upon the upper wing was an inverted de Havilland Gipsy III instead. While the fuel tanks of the Ferry had sufficient size for around five hours of flight at cruising speeds, to best suit its air-experience role, the tanks were only ever partially filled, else it wouldn't be able to carry its maximum capacity of ten passengers.

The Ferry was a biplane with equal-span wings, both of which were positioned high relative to the fuselage, with the lower wing being aligned with the top of the fuselage. According to Alan Cobham, this arrangement was to provide the passengers with an unobstructed view of the ground. The structure of the aircraft was conventional and largely composed of spruce and plywood, featuring monocoque construction across the fuselage. The wings were supported by box spars paired with wooden flanges and steel tubes for key areas such as the compression drag struts.

While the Ferry had been designed specifically for short-haul pleasure flying, the design team made provisions towards its use in other roles, such as a longer distance airliner carrying five or six passengers with luggage. Despite having ten seats, which necessitated the fitting of a radio under British regulations of the era, it was certified for local flying without any radio present. To enable a faster turnaround, relatively rapid refuelling was facilitated via a pipeline to the tank from the side of the fuselage. An unusual feature of the design, believed to provide a beneficial ground-cushioning effect as well as possibly additional lift, was the aerofoil-section fairings present on the split-axle undercarriage.

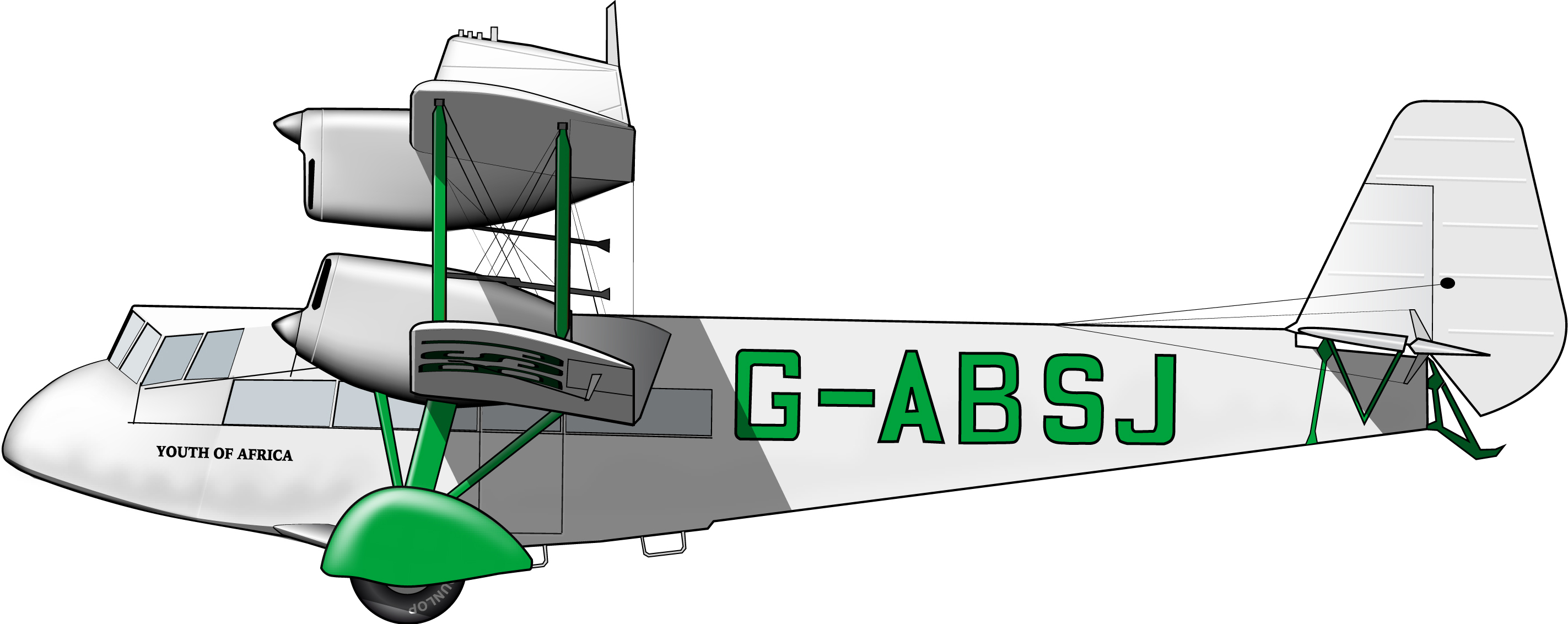
The Airspeed Ferry "Youth of Africa", formerly "Youth of Britain III" in 1933.

== Operational history ==
On 24 April, delivery of the prototype officially took place; it made the type's first public appearance following month. The prototype was quickly followed by the second aircraft, G-ABSJ Youth of Britain III. Both aircraft were used as envisioned for Cobham's air-experience flights, attracting large numbers of the public to ride in them. According to the aviation periodical Flight, within their first season of operation alone, the two aircraft had carried around 92,000 passengers. This was achieved via a particularly fast turnaround rate, taking as little as 30 seconds, while refuelling only took one and a half minutes.

In 1940, following the outbreak of the Second World War, the first aircraft (G-ABSI) was impressed into service with the Royal Air Force (RAF) and given the military registration AV968. It was active at RAF Halton until November 1940, after which it saw use as an instructional airframe, registered as 2758M.

The second aircraft received repairable damage from a crash in July 1932, only one month after its delivery. During 1934, the second aircraft was sold in India to Himalaya Air Transport and Survey Company Limited as VT-AFO. For around six months, it was used to ferry pilgrims from Haridwar to Gaucher. However, it was destroyed by vandals in a hangar fire in 1936.

The third (G-ACBT) and fourth (G-ACFB) aircraft were built for the Midland and Scottish Air Ferries Ltd and used on services from Renfrew to Campbeltown, Belfast and Speke. However, these services were suspended after roughly 18 months of operation on 30 September 1934 due to the closure of the company, after which both aircraft were put up for sale. G-ACBT was not sold and was dismantled in 1941. G-ACFB returned to England to be used for pleasure flying for Air Publicity Ltd. It was pressed into service with the RAF in 1941 and later saw use as an instructional airframe.

While Airspeed promoted the Ferry for sale at £3,975, and negotiations with prospective customers such as Hillman's Airways were undertaken, no further examples were built. This was in part due to competition from other contemporary airliners, such as the de Havilland Dragon, which typically offered higher cruising speeds.

== Operators ==
=== Civil operators ===
British India

- Himalaya Air Transport and Survey Company Ltd

United Kingdom

- Air Publicity Ltd
- Midland & Scottish Air Ferries Ltd
- National Aviation Day Displays Ltd
- C.W.A. Scott's Flying Displays Ltd
- Portsea, Southsea and Isle of Wight Aviation Ltd
- Sir Alan Cobham
- C.W.A. Scott

=== Military operators ===
United Kingdom

- Royal Air Force
  - Halton Station Flight

== Specifications ==
Data from British Civil Aircraft since 1919:Volume I

General characteristics

- Crew: 1
- Capacity: 10 passengers
- Length: 39 ft 8 in (12.09 m)
- Wingspan: 55 ft 0 in (16.76 m)
- Height: 14 ft 3 in (4.34 m)
- Wing area: 610.5 sq ft (56.72 m^{2})
- Empty weight: 3,300 lb (1,497 kg)
- Max takeoff weight: 5,400 lb (2,449 kg)
- Powerplant: 3 × de Havilland Gipsy II and III air-cooled inline piston, 120 hp (89 kW) each

Performance

- Maximum speed: 112 mph (180 km/h, 97 kn)
- Cruise speed: 100 mph (160 km/h, 87 kn)
- Stall speed: 49 mph (79 km/h, 43 kn)
- Range: 340 mi (550 km, 300 nmi)
- Service ceiling: 15,500 ft (4,700 m)
- Rate of climb: 800 ft/min (4.1 m/s)

== See also ==
Related lists

- List of aircraft of the Royal Air Force
