= Airspeed Cambridge =

British two-seat advanced trainer

AS.45 Cambridge

General information
- Type: Military advanced trainer
- Manufacturer: Airspeed Limited
- Number built: 2

History
- First flight: 19 February 1941

The Airspeed AS.45 Cambridge was a British advanced trainer of the Second World War built by Airspeed Limited. It did not reach the production stage.

== Development ==
The AS.45 was designed in response to Air Ministry Specification T.4/39 (Note: Specification T.34/39 according to Mondey and Taylor.) for a single-engined advanced trainer to guard against potential shortages of current types, such as the Miles Master and North American Harvard. Airspeed's design, given the provisional service name Cambridge, was a low-wing monoplane of composite construction with a single piston engine and a tailwheel-type, retractable undercarriage. The Cambridge's fuselage had a steel tube structure, while the wings and tail were wooden, with plywood skinning. Pilot and instructor sat in tandem in an enclosed cockpit, with each crew position having doors on each side, one for normal use and one an emergency exit. A 730 hp (540 kW) Bristol Mercury engine drove a three-bladed propeller.

The first of two prototypes flew on 19 February 1941. Testing showed deficiencies in both maximum speed and low-speed flight characteristics.

There was no attempt to rectify these shortcomings, partly because there was no shortage of advanced trainers thanks to plentiful supplies of Masters and Harvards and partly because of the importance of Airspeed's other products, the Horsa and Oxford.

== Specifications (AS.45) ==
Data from The Hamlyn Concise Guide to British Aircraft of World War II

General characteristics

- Crew: 2
- Length: 36 ft 1 in (11.00 m)
- Wingspan: 42 ft 0 in (12.80 m)
- Height: 11 ft 6 in (3.51 m)
- Wing area: 290 sq ft (27 m^{2})
- Powerplant: 1 × Bristol Mercury VIII radial engine 2-blade, 730 hp (540 kW)

Performance

- Maximum speed: 237 mph (381 km/h, 206 kn)
- Range: 680 mi (1,090 km, 590 nmi)
- Service ceiling: 24,800 ft (7,600 m)
- Rate of climb: 1,200 ft/min (6.1 m/s)

== See also ==
Aircraft of comparable role, configuration, and era

- Arado Ar 96
- Miles Master
- North American Harvard
- Tachikawa Ki-55
