= Airspeed Viceroy =

AS.8 Viceroy
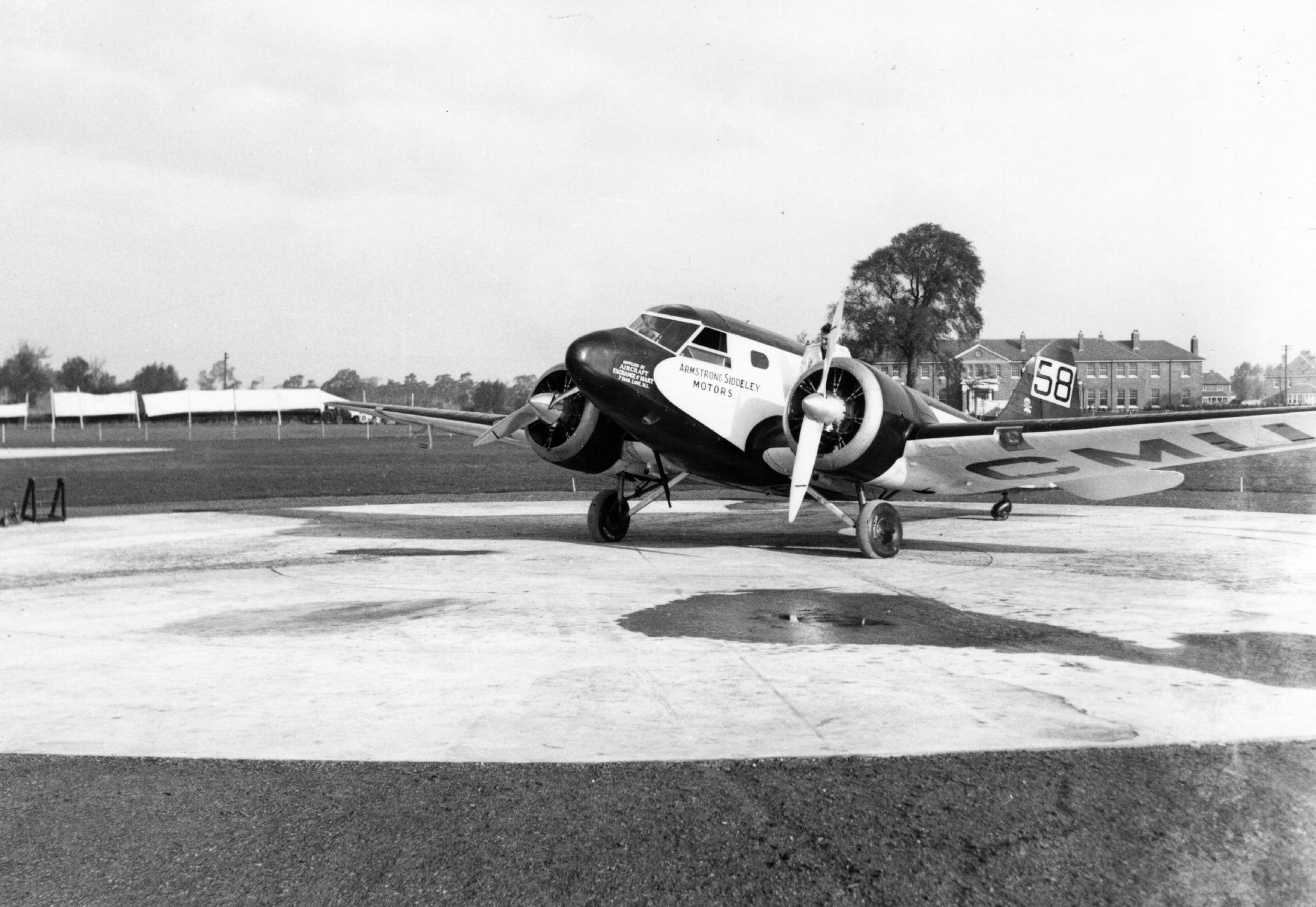

General information
- Type: Racing Monoplane
- Manufacturer: Airspeed (1934) Ltd
- Designer: N.S. Norway / Hessell Tiltman
- Status: Unknown
- Number built: 1

History
- Manufactured: 1934
- Introduction date: 1934
- First flight: 1934
- Developed from: Airspeed Envoy

The Airspeed AS.8 Viceroy was a British racing version of the Airspeed AS.6 Envoy built by Airspeed (1934) Limited at Portsmouth. The Viceroy was built to order for Captain T. Neville Stack and Sydney Lewis Turner, to compete in the England-Australia MacRobertson Air Race. Only one aircraft, registered G-ACMU, was built.

== Design and development ==
The Viceroy was a modified Airspeed Envoy. Modifications included:

- More powerful, supercharged Armstrong Siddeley Cheetah VI engines in long chord, smooth NACA cowlings
- Strengthened main landing gear to allow higher weight takeoff
- An auxiliary petrol tank, capacity was 270 Imp gallon/1,227 litres installed in the aft fuselage
- Narrowed fuselage without passenger windows

== Operational history ==
The Airspeed Viceroy started the race from RAF Mildenhall, England, but after several reliability problems including with the mainwheel brakes, it was withdrawn from the race at Athens. The pilots concluded that it would be unsafe to proceed and they would probably be unable to finish the race. An acrimonious set of legal actions followed, with the pilots complaining that the aircraft, beset by multiple problems, had been "not really ready". Airspeed contested the action, and eventually the aircraft was returned to them without refund. The aircraft returned to Portsmouth and was then stored until July 1936 when it was sold the following month by the French concern, SFTA and departed to France en route to the Spanish Civil War.

Documentation regarding the Viceroy's service with the Spanish Republican Air Force is sketchy. The intention was to convert the aircraft into a bomber and photographs suggest that it did receive new markings and was stationed at an airbase, but further information is not available as to its actual service.

== Operators ==
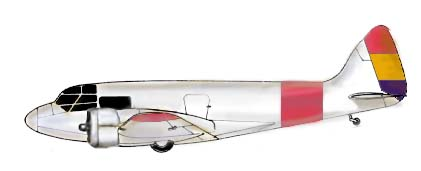
AS.8 Viceroy in Spanish Republican Air Force colour scheme

Spanish Republic

- Spanish Republican Air Force

== Specifications ==
Data from British Civil Aircraft since 1919 Volume 1

General characteristics

- Crew: 2
- Length: 34 ft 6 in (10.52 m)
- Wingspan: 51 ft 0 in (15.54 m)
- Height: 9 ft 6 in (2.90 m)
- Wing area: 299 sq ft (27.8 m^{2})
- Empty weight: 3,900 lb (1,769 kg)
- Gross weight: 6,300 lb (2,858 kg)
- Powerplant: 2 × Armstrong Siddeley Cheetah VI supercharged radial piston engine, 290 hp (220 kW) each

Performance

- Maximum speed: 210 mph (340 km/h, 180 kn)
- Cruise speed: 190 mph (310 km/h, 170 kn)
- Range: 1,400 mi (2,300 km, 1,200 nmi)
- Rate of climb: 1,000 ft/min (5.1 m/s)

== See also ==
- MacRobertson Air Race
