= A. H. Tiltman =

Alfred Hessell Tiltman FRAeS (17 March 1891 – 28 October 1975), known as Hessell Tiltman, was a notable and talented British aircraft designer, and co-founder of Airspeed Ltd.

== Early life ==
His parents married on October 10 1885 at St Helen's church in Kensington.

He was born at 70 Torrington Square in March 1891. He was the son of the architect Alfred Hessell Tiltman (1854-1910).

He had a sister, Mary (August 11 1889 - September 20 1965). A brother, born in 1894, was Brigadier John Tiltman CBE.

His father died on July 7 1910, aged 56. His mother, Ann Sarah Jane Kerr (1855-1934), died aged 78 in Portsmouth, on March 28 1934.

He graduated in engineering from London University, then served an apprenticeship with the Daimler Co in 1910-11 and worked on structural steel design in Canada (the Quebec bridge) and England.

== Career ==
=== de Havilland ===
In 1916 he joined Geoffrey de Havilland’s company Airco; then moved to the De Havilland Aircraft Company when it was formed in 1921. As assistant designer he was involved in the design and testing of a number of DH aircraft, from the small DH 60 Moth to the DH 66 Hercules airliner.

=== Airspeed ===
He then worked on the Vickers R100 airship with Nevil Shute Norway. Following the disaster to the rival, Government sponsored R101, the British airship programme was cancelled with the result that, in 1931, Norway and Tiltman founded Airspeed Ltd. Tiltman designed all Airspeed's early aircraft, including the three-engined Ferry (for Sir Alan Cobham's flying circus), the innovative and fast single-engined Courier, and the elegant twin-engined Envoy.

The Courier was the first British aircraft for many years to incorporate a hydraulically operated, retractable undercarriage and was used (by Alan Cobham) to pioneer in-flight refuelling. In the 1934 MacRobertson air race from England to Australia, a Courier finished in seventh place, making very good time against formidable opposition from aircraft such as de Havilland's purpose built Comets and a Douglas DC2 airliner.

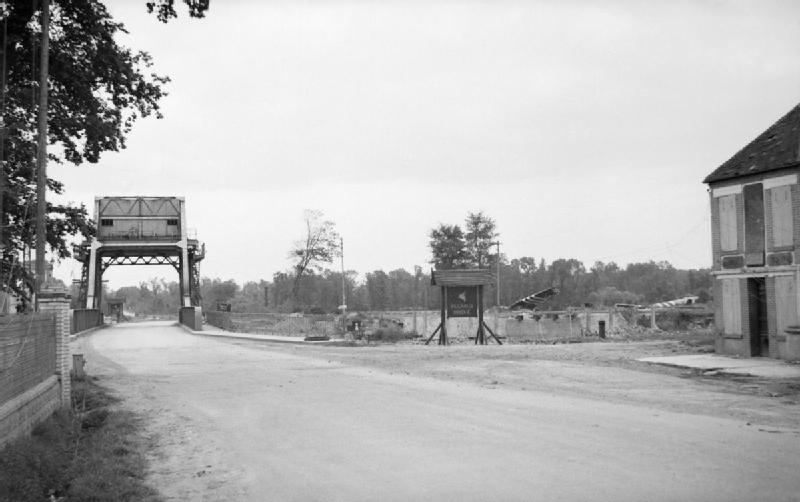
Airspeed Horsa gliders at Pegasus Bridge in July 1944

In 1937, an Envoy was delivered to the King's Flight for the personal use of the royal family. With the approach of war, the Envoy was developed into the Airspeed Oxford, which became the standard RAF and Commonwealth multi-engined pilot trainer for many years. A total of 8,751 Oxfords were built.

In 1940 Tiltman designed the Horsa glider which was used to carry troops on D-Day and at Arnhem. The Horsa went from the drawing board to the air in ten months, which he said was “not too bad considering the drawings had to be made suitable for the furniture trade who were responsible for all production".

=== Own company ===
He left Airspeed soon after, and in 1948 co-founded Tiltman Langley, of which he was Technical Director and Chairman for six years.

Altogether Tiltman designed about 15 different types of aircraft. He was elected Fellow of the Royal Aeronautical Society in 1933 for his design of the Airspeed Courier with its retractable undercarriage.

== Personal life ==
He married Miriam Rowley (1901 - April 21 1986). They had a son, Peter (May 4 1926 - September 20 1987), who died in San Jose, California.

His wife later lived on Barrack Lane in Bognor Regis in West Sussex, after earlier living in Chidham, and died in Aldwick in April 1986.

His son Peter married Frances, with grandchildren Richard, Heather and Jamie.
