= Self-sealing fuel tank =

Fuel container that automatically seals when punctured

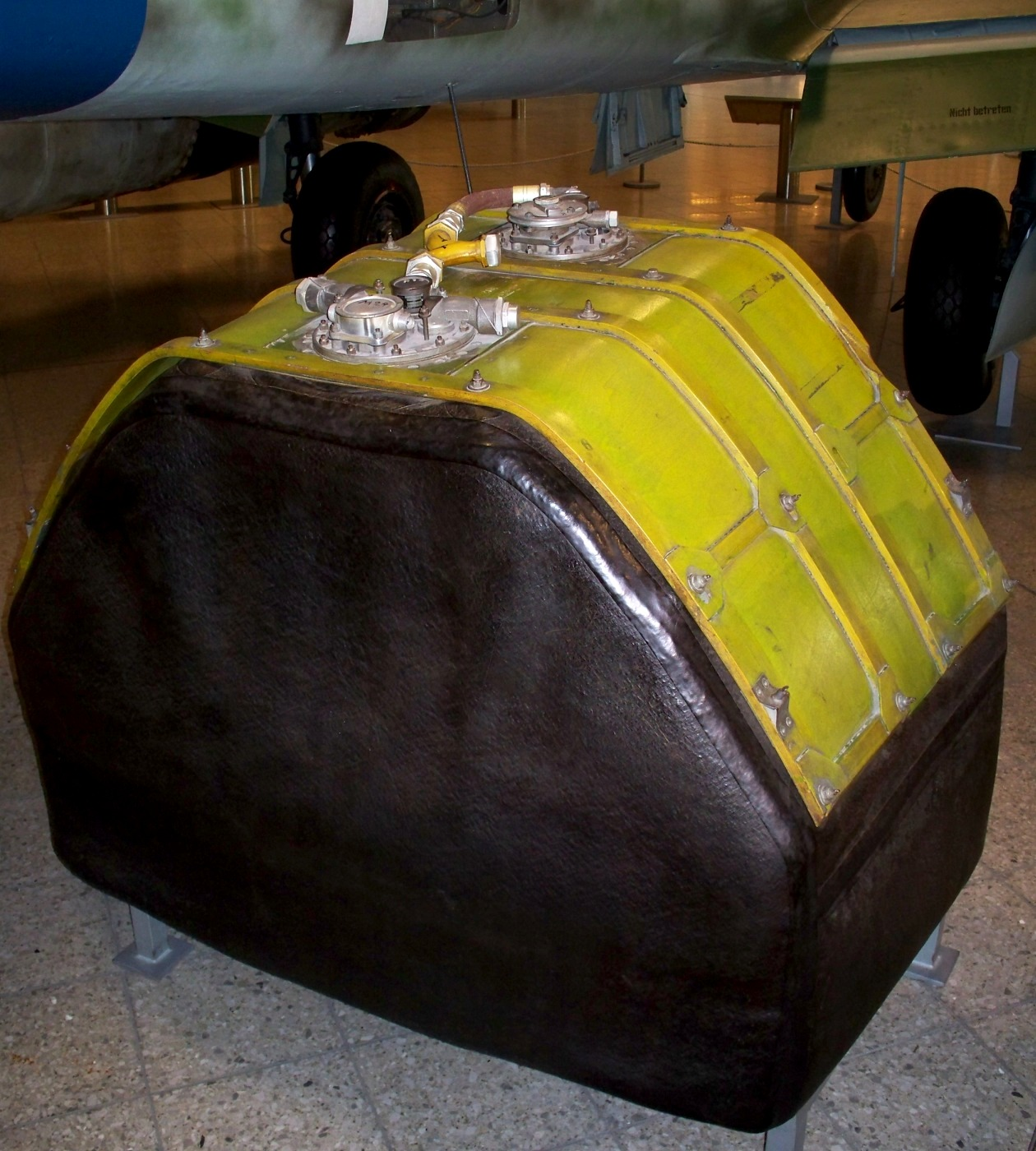
Self-sealing fuel tank of Me 262

A self-sealing fuel tank (SSFT) is a type of fuel tank, typically used in aircraft fuel tanks or fuel bladders, that prevents them from leaking fuel and igniting after being damaged.

Typical self-sealing tanks have layers of rubber and reinforcing fabric, one of vulcanised rubber and one of untreated natural rubber, which can absorb fuel when it comes into contact with it. When a fuel tank is punctured the fuel seeps into these layers, causing the untreated layer to swell, closing and thus sealing the puncture. A similar concept is also employed for making self-sealing run-flat tires.

== History ==
=== World War I ===
George J. Murdock applied for the patent "War Aeroplane Fuel Tanks" on February 7, 1917 but was temporarily blocked by an order of the Federal Trade Commission, on February 6, 1918, to keep any discussion or publication of the invention secret. The order was rescinded by the United States Patent Office on September 26, 1918 and Murdock was eventually granted U.S. patent 1,386,791 "Self-Puncture Sealing Covering for Fuel-Containers" on August 9, 1921. Military aircraft built by the Glenn L. Martin Company used this self-sealing fuel tank.

Howard Hughes used neoprene to self-seal his fuel tanks on his 1938 around the world flight.

=== World War II ===
In the newer generations of pre-war and early-war aircraft, self-sealing tanks were used to minimise the damage from leaking or burning fuel. A conventional fuel tank, when hit by gunfire, could leak fuel rapidly. This would not only reduce the aircraft's range but was also a significant fire hazard. Damaged fuel tanks could also rupture, destroying the airframe or critically affecting flight characteristics. It was realised that, because of weight limitations, it was not practical to simply add armour plating to aircraft fuel tanks; a method of stopping fuel leaking from damaged tanks was necessary.

Early attempts at protecting fuel tanks consisted of using metal tanks, covered inside or outside by a material that expanded after being pierced. Research revealed that the exit of the projectile, rather than the entry, was the greater problem, as it often tumbled, thus creating a larger exit hole. Among the earliest versions of these types of tanks were those manufactured in the UK at Portsmouth Airport by Fireproof Tanks Ltd (formed in 1939). These tanks were first installed in the Fairey Battle light bomber with other versions installed in Supermarine Spitfire and Hawker Hurricane fighters and larger aircraft such as the Avro Lancaster heavy bomber. The Henderson Safety Tank Company provided crash-proof self-sealing fuel and oil tanks which were fitted "as standard" to the Miles Master trainer.

German aircraft designers used layers of rubber laid over leather hide with a treated fibre inner surface for the self-sealing tanks on the Junkers Ju 88 early in the war.

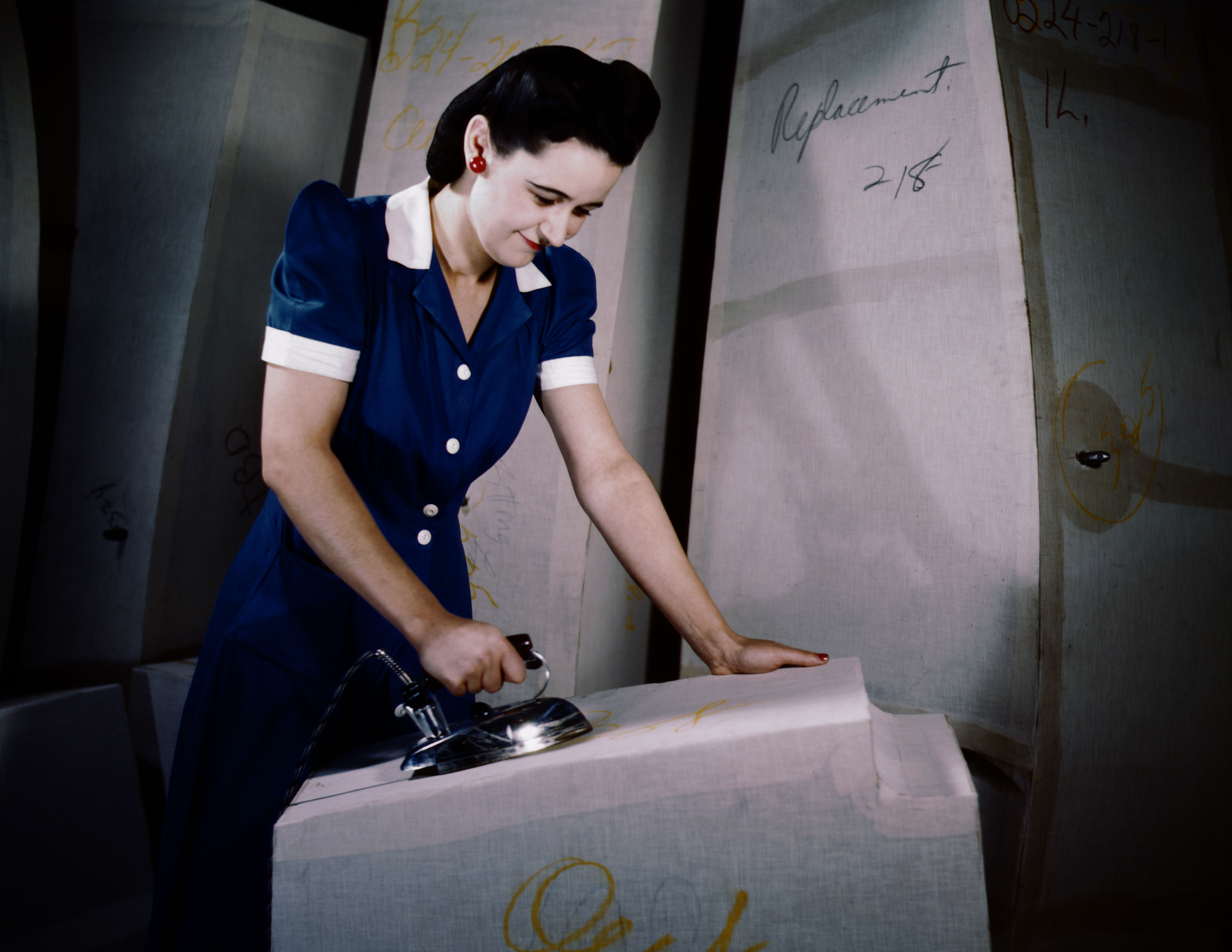
Manufacture of self-sealing gas tanks at Goodyear, 1941

In the United States, Ernst Eger of United States Rubber Company (later Uniroyal) patented a self-sealing fuel tank design in 1941, one of many companies involved in developing this technology during the war. Elmo E. Hanson, lead chemist for Firestone Tire and Rubber Company filed a patent for self sealing tanks on January 21, 1941, U.S. patent 2,404,766. Goodyear chemist James Merrill filed a patent in 1941 (published in 1947) for refining and testing his method for manufacturing self-sealing tanks using a two-layer system of rubber compounds encased in a metal outer shell or the wing lining of the aircraft.

In 1942, Eger received a War Production Board citation and the Goodyear tanks were placed in service in Goodyear-produced Vought F4U Corsair fighters, as well as other aircraft. By 1942 Fireproof Tanks had developed the first flexible fuel bladders as range extender tanks for the Spitfire Mk IX. These tanks were flexible containers, made of a laminated self-sealing material like vulcanised rubber and with as few seams as possible to minimise leak paths. The same principles were applied to give self-sealing fuel lines in aircraft (MIL-PRF-7061C).

As early tests showed that impact could over-pressurise a fuel tank, the self-sealing fuel cell is suspended, allowing it to absorb shocks without rupture. US Navy fuel tanks during the war were able to withstand .50 in (12.7 mm) bullets and, on occasion, 20 mm (0.79 in) autocannon shells.

Self-sealing tanks also tended to have lower capacity than non-sealed tanks. Also implementation of self-sealing technology into aircraft fuel tanks had the chief drawback of making the aircraft heavier (and thus slower, less manoeuvrable, and of lower endurance and operational range). The Mitsubishi A6M Zero was not designed with self-sealing tanks, even though the technology was available, since manoeuvrability and endurance were viewed as more important at the time.

Aircraft that were fitted with self-sealing tanks managed to withstand much more damage than those with conventional fuel tanks. For instance, combat experience in the Pacific War showed that the self-sealing fuel tank-equipped American aircraft had better chances of surviving damage to fuel tanks than the Japanese aircraft designs without self-sealing fuel tanks, such as the Mitsubishi A6M Zero.

== Modern use ==
Most jet fighters and all US military rotary wing aircraft use some type of self-sealing tanks. Military rotary wing fuel tanks have the additional feature of being crashworthy. High altitudes require the tanks to be pressurised, making self-sealing difficult. Newer technologies have brought advances like inert foam-filled tanks to prevent detonation. This foam is an open cell foam that effectively divides the gas space above the remaining fuel into thousands of small spaces, none of which contain sufficient vapour to support combustion. This foam also serves to reduce fuel slosh. Major manufacturers of this technology include Hutchinson, Amfuel (ex-Zodiac, formerly Firestone), Meggitt (formerly Goodyear), Robertson Fuel Systems, GKN USA, FPT Industries, and Safran Aerosystems. FPT is now part of GKN. For military use, tanks are qualified to MIL-DTL-27422 (includes crashworthiness requirements) or MIL-DTL-5578 (non-crashworthy). An aircraft fuel tank sometimes consists of several interconnected fuel cells. The interconnecting hoses are typically also self-sealing.

In addition to military aircraft, some military LAND vehicles feature self-sealing fuel tanks, such as the United States Marine Corps' LAV-AT armoured vehicles. A notable example of a non-military vehicle that uses self-sealing fuel tanks is the US presidential state car, having used them since John F. Kennedy's SS-100-X.

Self-sealing fuel tanks using military technology are also required in some motorsport categories.

== See also ==
- Index of aviation articles
