= Hants and Sussex Aviation Herald =

Herald
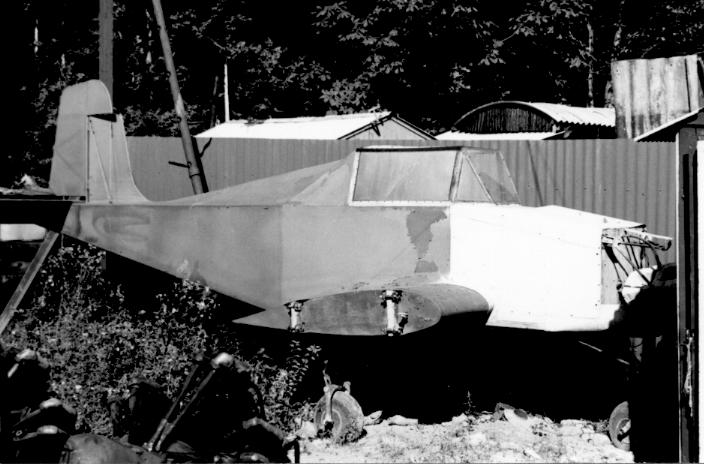
- The Hants and Sussex Herald after withdrawal at Portsmouth airport in 1955

General information
- Type: Ultra-light single-seat aircraft
- National origin: United Kingdom
- Manufacturer: Hants and Sussex Aviation Ltd
- Status: Scrapped
- Primary user: Manufacturer
- Number built: 1

History
- First flight: 1953
- Retired: 1955

The Hants and Sussex Aviation Herald was a British ultra-light single seat aircraft of the 1940s.

== Design and development ==
The Herald was designed and built by Hants and Sussex Aviation Ltd at their factory at Portsmouth Airport two miles north of the city. The design designation H.S.1 was allocated to the aircraft. It was a single-seat ultra-light aircraft and was fitted with a fixed tricycle undercarriage. It was powered by one 40 h.p. Aeronca-JAP J-99 engine.

== Operational history ==
The Herald was allocated the registration marks G-ALYA in February 1950. During testing at Portsmouth Airport in 1953, the aircraft's performance proved to be poor and it made a few hops before being retired. It remained at the airport until late 1955 when it was dismantled and scrapped.

== Specifications ==
Data from Jackson.

General characteristics

- Crew: 1
- Length: 21 ft 6 in (6.55 m)
- Wingspan: 29 ft 0 in (8.84 m)
- Empty weight: 580 lb (263 kg)
- Gross weight: 900 lb (408 kg)
- Powerplant: 1 × Aeronca-JAP J-99 piston engine , 40 hp (30 kW)

Performance

- Maximum speed: 92 mph (148 km/h, 80 kn)
- Cruise speed: 82 mph (132 km/h, 71 kn)
