= Hants and Sussex Aviation =

UK company

Hants and Sussex Aviation Ltd
- Type: Aircraft design, manufacture, repair and modification
- Industry: Aircraft
- Headquarters: Portsmouth Airport, Portsmouth, Hampshire, England

Hants and Sussex Aviation Ltd (alternatively known as H+S Aviation) was a British aviation manufacturer. Based at Portsmouth Airport, Hampshire, England, throughout much of its existence, the company is still in business in the aircraft components industry.

Hants and Sussex Aviation was established shortly after the end of the Second World War; initially pursuing a wide range of aviation activities, including the development of its own internally-designed light aircraft, the company became focused on engine overhaul services and the aerospace component markets. Over the years, it has formed numerous agreements and partnerships with other companies to provide repair and support services to their customer bases, orientated especially towards engine manufacturers such as Pratt & Whitney and Rolls-Royce. The company adopted the H+S Aviation name during 1986. During March 1998, the company was acquired by British aircraft engineering and transport company BBA Group, becoming its subsidiary thereafter.

== History ==
The business was originally established during 1946 as Hants and Sussex Aviation by the Hawes family. It initially established its offices at Bognor Regis as well as its first workshop in Fratton, outside Portsmouth. During 1947, Hants and Sussex Aviation opted to centre its operations at a site on the edge of Portsmouth Municipal Airport, Hampshire; this would serve as its long-term base, even following the airport's closure during 1973, into the 21st century.

Early on, Hants and Sussex Aviation found work via government contracts for the demolition of surplus aircraft and aeroengines from the Second World War. By 1949, scrapping activities were reducing due to a decrease in demand for such work; in response, the company chose to expand its aircraft maintenance and engine overhaul activities. It became the first independent engine overhaul facility to be equipped with its own dynamometer test cell in 1956. The aeroentine engine sector would provide much business for Hants and Sussex Aviation across the remainder of the 20th century.

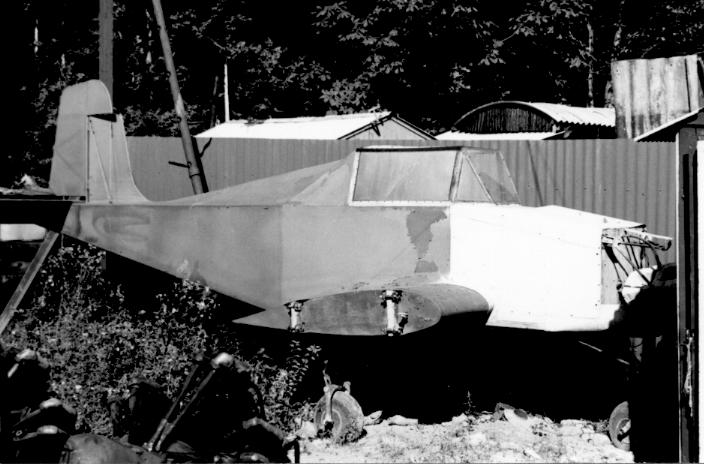
The Hants & Sussex Herald at Portsmouth Airport after its withdrawal in 1955

During 1949, the company decided to design its first aircraft, the Hants and Sussex Aviation Herald. It was a single-seat ultra-light aircraft, furnished with a fixed tricycle undercarriage and powered by an Aeronca-JAP J-99 piston engine, capable of generating up to 40 h.p. During 1953, the Herald underwent a series of flight tests at Portsmouth Airport; however, testing revealed that the aircraft possessed a poor performance, leading to the type's grounding. The aircraft was dismantled without ceremony during 1955.

On 16 January 1950, the company purchased a batch of six Avro Lancastrian Mk. CII as surplus airframes from the RAF (Serial Numbers VL980, VM702, VM725, VM726, VM727, VM735); the post-service histories of these aircraft are unknown, as are their civilian call signs. During 1964, Hants and Sussex Aviation was contracted to manufacture a pair of pre-First World War flightworthy replica aircraft for the film Those Magnificent Men in their Flying Machines. This two replicas were of the Antoinette IV, which was powered by a single de Havilland Gipsy I engine.

Despite these side ventures, Hants and Sussex Aviation continued to concentrate much of its resources on the overhaul, modification and repair of aircraft engines and components. During 1968, it acquired rival firm RTZ Pillar Engineering Group; three years later, the company also bought out Air Engine Services Ltd. During 1971, the firm began servicing gas turbine engines for the first time, providing repair and overhaul technical services for the Rolls-Royce Dart turboprop. Two years later, it was appointed an official distributor for the Allison Model 250 turboshaft engine. The closure of Portsmouth Airport in 1973, where Hants and Sussex Aviation had the majority of its workshops, directly led to the discontinuation of the firm's aircraft maintenance activities.

During the late 1970s, Hants and Sussex Aviation was promoting its capabilities for the overhaul and repair of Continental piston engines for aircraft. In 1980, the company signed a technical assistance agreement with American conglomerate General Electric to provide services for its T58 turboshaft engine. During the following year, Hants and Sussex Aviation purchased the design rights for the de Havilland Gipsy Major and de Havilland Gipsy Queen piston engines. In 1983, another agreement with General Electric covering its CT7 powerplant was finalised; it also received approval to support the Rolls-Royce Nimbus turboshaft engine. During 1986, the company was formally renamed H+S Aviation. By September 1986, the firm was engaged in overhauling and modifying multiple turboprop engines, including the Pratt and Whitney PT6.

During 1992, all of H+S Aviation's activities were relocated to its Portsmouth hub. During the following year, the firm was acquired by MB Caradon plc; it would be sold onto Vector Corporation three years later. By 1995, H+S Aviation had reportedly become the largest authorised maintenance centre for the Allison 250 powerplant in Europe. In June 1997, it was announced that H+S Aviation had launched a new venture, H+S Proptech, to repair and overhaul propellers of various manufacturers, including Hamilton Standard, McCauley, Hartzell and Dowty. That same year, it decided to discontinue all overhaul and repair activities on piston engines. During 1998, the firm agreed with Sundstrand Corporation to establish a European Service Centre for servicing the latter's auxiliary power units (APU). By 2008, the company was providing support for various engines in Pratt and Whitney's lineup, such as the PW100 and PW901 APU series. During 2015, H+S Aviation received approval to overhaul the Pratt & Whitney Canada PW200 family at its Abu Dubai facility; H+S Aviation managing director Mark Taylor stated that the firm aimed to expand its rotorcraft support capabilities throughout the region.

During March 1998, British aircraft engineering and transport company BBA Group acquired H+S Aviation from its previous parent Vector Industries in exchange for £29.5 million; the move came as part of the former's strategy of building up its regional aviation services business. Later that year, the firm owned a new APU overhaul facility, having previously secured work via a support agreement with American company AlliedSignal.
