= FPT Industries =

British aerospace engineering company

FPT Industries was formed in July 1939 as Fireproof Tanks Ltd (commonly known as FPT) as a subsidiary of Airspeed Ltd at Portsmouth Airport in response to an Air Ministry requirement for the development and manufacture of self-sealing fuel tanks for the impending war with Germany.

The intention of the board of directors was to commence work on the manufacture of self-sealing fuel tanks for aircraft entering service with the Royal Air Force, the highest priority being the Fairey Battle single engined bomber which, although obsolete, was regarded as a front line bomber by the Royal Air Force.

The early tanks were of welded aluminium structure, with the sealing material applied as a composite layer on the outside. A major problem with welded aluminium tanks is weld decay and metal fatigue in the seams due to vibration in service. In response to this, the company started to develop flexible fuel bladders in the early 1940s. One of the earliest examples of this was a composite flexible fuel bladder with self-sealing coatings for the Supermarine Spitfire MkIX.

== Post-war ==
During the war years and into the emerging jet age, Fireproof Tanks Ltd developed new technologies in rubber formulation, moulding, and sheet production in order to remain a leader in other specialist markets such as the creation of hovercraft skirts. Working with Saunders Roe at Cowes on the Isle of Wight, the company became so important to the hovercraft industry that the now renamed FPT Industries was bought by the British Hovercraft Corporation in 1966.

== Rationalisation of the aircraft industry ==
The British Hovercraft Corporation was bought out by Westland Helicopters of Yeovil and a period of stability came as Westlands developed cutting edge composite material manufacture as part of its approach to advanced helicopter design and hovercraft construction. This paid dividends with advances in rotor blade design such as BERP rotors, later seen on the Westland Lynx and EH101 helicopters.

== Post-1990 and the GKN buyout ==
In the 1990s, Westland Group was purchased by GKN Plc, which restructured the businesses before selling its shares in Westland Helicopters to Agusta of Italy. Finding the advanced composite business that Westlands had developed attractive, GKN retained the other Westland companies and renamed them GKN Aerospace.

During this time, FPT Industries diversified again by developing advanced materials for helicopter emergency flotation systems (EFS) and now manufactures EFS equipment for many large commercial and military helicopter types.

GKN Aerospace Portsmouth, as the business is now known, still manufactures self-sealing fuel tanks, and other fuel systems as well as helicopter EFS.

GKN Aerospace Portsmouth, together with Portsmouth Aviation and Hants & Sussex Aviation, are now all that remain of the once large aircraft manufacturing base at Portsmouth Airport which built aircraft such as the Airspeed Oxford, the Horsa glider and components for the Hawker Siddeley Trident.
