= Portsmouth Airport (Hampshire) =

Airport on Portsea Island, England, 1932–1973

Portsmouth Airport, AKA PWA (Portsmouth Airport)
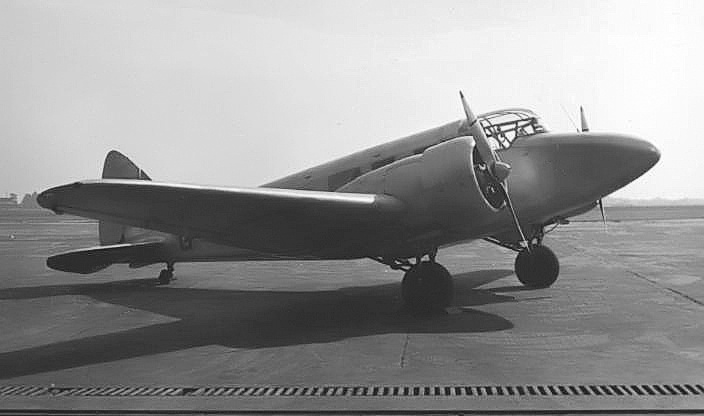
- Airspeed Consul light airliner converted from an Oxford RAF trainer at Portsmouth Airport in 1946
- IATA: PME; ICAO: none

Summary
- Airport type: Public
- Owner/Operator: Portsmouth City Council
- Serves: Portsmouth
- Location: Portsea Island, Portsmouth, Hampshire, England
- In use: 1932–1973
- Elevation AMSL: 6 ft (1.8 m)
- Coordinates: 50°49′42″N 001°03′00″W

Map
- Location in Hampshire

Portsmouth Airport, also known as Portsmouth City Airport, PWA (Portsmouth Worldwide Airport) and Hilsea Airport, was situated at the northeast Hilsea corner of Portsea Island on the south coast of England and was one of the last remaining commercial grass runway airports in the United Kingdom.

== Location ==
Sandwiched between Hilsea railway station and the waters of Langstone Harbour, the airport offered little scope for expansion and, following some accidents with larger aircraft in the 1960s, the airport's last official flight took place on 31 December 1973 and was closed.

== Construction and opening ==
The airport was constructed during 1931 and early 1932 as Portsmouth's municipal airport, having been authorised by the Portsmouth Corporation Act 1930 (20 & 21 Geo. 5. c. lii). The airfield's name "Portsmouth" was marked in stone next to a large circle in the centre of the landing area. An opening display was held for the public on 2 July 1932 with an Armstrong Whitworth Argosy airliner and other civil and military aircraft being present.

The airport had three grass runways, arranged in a triangular formation; with runways orientated at 36/18 (0°, 180°), 07/25 (70°, 250°) and 12/30 (120°, 300°).

== Portsmouth, Southsea and Isle of Wight Aviation ==
P.S.I.O.W.A. moved to the airport in 1932 (having previously been based on the Isle of Wight under the name Inland Flying Services) and operated the first air ferry service in the South of England, flying passengers from Portsmouth Airport to Ryde on the Isle of Wight. The popularity of air travel grew rapidly and soon P.S.I.O.W.A. were offering high-frequency services between airfields around the South and the Isle of Wight, even joining forces with coach and train services to provide connections from London and Cardiff. The company continued to expand and were using a range of small aircraft including an eight-seat three-engined Westland Wessex G-ABVB by 1936. This aircraft was damaged beyond repair at Ryde on 30 May 1936.

== Portsmouth Aviation ==
PSIOWA began to expand rapidly before the war and began to undertake aircraft maintenance and modification in their hangars at the airport, in addition to the successful ferry services. At the start of the Second World War PSIOWA were ordered to stop their flying services in order to concentrate on the manufacture and repair side of the business. PSIOWA planes and pilots (including famous aviator Amy Johnson) were sent to serve as part of the National Air Communications Scheme while the site and skills at the Portsmouth Airport site were used to repair and modify several thousand military aircraft for return to service. The company changed its name to Portsmouth Aviation in 1946, with a view to expanding both the aviation and manufacturing sides of the business and, the following year, their newly designed Portsmouth Aerocar made its first flight. This five-seat aircraft had an unusual twin-engined, twin-boom, high-wing layout. It was exhibited at the Farnborough Air Show 1948 and 1949 but due to the nationalisation of the rail and air services the company were unable to manufacture orders received for the craft. Around 1950, the company built a modest number of bus bodies. The company continued to run a smaller air-ferry service to overseas destinations, but development occurred on the manufacturing, repair, design and development sides of the business. The company continues to operate at this site, now offering a range of services beyond aviation.

== Airspeed Limited ==
Airspeed Ltd moved to a new factory at Portsmouth Airport in 1933. Their prewar designs built at the airport included the Courier and the Envoy light transport aircraft. Aeronautical engineer and novelist Nevil Shute Norway was employed by Airspeed, he has two roads in Portsmouth near to the airport site named in his honour, Norway Road (formerly Rat Lane) and Nevil Shute Road.

Between 1938 and 1945, the factory built several thousand Oxford twin-engined training aircraft for the Royal Air Force and other air arms. The company had been acquired by de Havilland Aircraft in 1940. Airspeed converted over 150 Oxfords postwar to civil aviation standards as the Consul (see heading photo) and these were flown until the mid-1950s by small charter and other operators. During the 1950s Airspeed manufactured parts and sub-assemblies at Portsmouth for their new aircraft designs, but in 1960 the firm moved all its remaining operations to their Christchurch Hampshire factory.

== Hants and Sussex Aviation ==
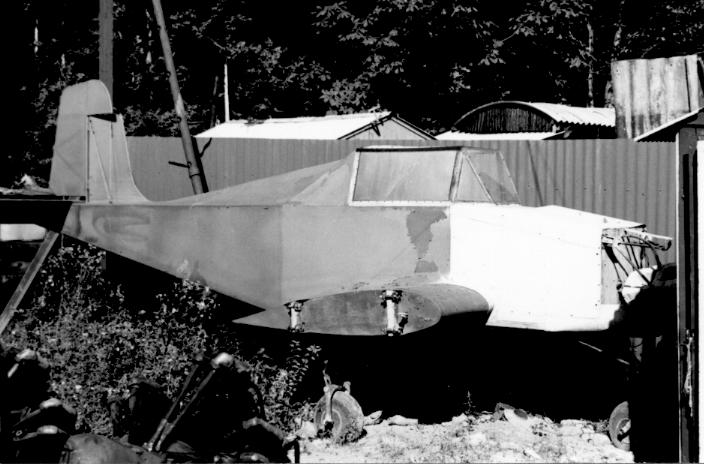
The Hants and Sussex Aviation Herald at Portsmouth Airport after withdrawal in 1955

H&SA have been established on the site for over fifty years. In 1949, the firm designed the Herald single-seat light aircraft, which made a few ground hops at the airfield in 1953. Registered G-ALYA, the sole example was an ultra-light aircraft with a tricycle undercarriage and was powered by a 40 hp Aeronca-JAP J-99 engine. The aircraft was dismantled in 1955.

During the late 1970s, the firm was handling the overhaul of light turbine and piston engines for aircraft and other uses. H&SA are still active today (2012). They operate under the name H+S Aviation and have 2 sites in Portsmouth. The firm are now owned by BBA Aviation who own various aviation companies across the world. In 2023 H+S Aviation were sold by BBA Aviation to StandAero who also own the Fleetlands site in nearby Gosport. The H+S Aviation site in Robinson Way was closed, with operations moving to the Fleetlands site, followed by most of the Airport Service Road site also relocating to Fleetlands too. All that remains in the Airport Service Road site now are the engine test facilities and the engine accessory facilities due to complexity and cost of relocation.

== Subsequent use ==
The area has been redeveloped with retail and industrial units, and a housing estate called Anchorage Park. But a few of the old aircraft industry companies remain on the site including Portsmouth Aviation, Hants and Sussex Aviation and FPT Industries.

The area has several roads named after local significant aircraft industry people, especially Norway Road (previously called 'Rat Lane') and Nevil Shute Way, which are both named after the author Nevil Shute (Nevil Shute Norway) who was one of the founders of Airspeed Ltd.

== Accidents and incidents ==
On 15 August 1967, two Channel Airways Hawker Siddeley HS 748-222 Srs. 2 (registration: G-ATEH and G-ATEK) were substantially damaged in separate landing accidents at Portsmouth Airport that occurred within two hours of each other.

The first of these, involving HS 748-222 G-ATEK, occurred at 11.48 local time. The aircraft was operating that day's scheduled service from Southend to Paris via Portsmouth. Following a circling approach to Portsmouth Airport, it touched down with normally c. 330 ft (100 m) left of grass strip 36's centre-line. The pilot flying the aircraft selected ground fine propeller pitch during landing followed by continuous application of the wheel brakes. Initially, the aircraft decelerated normally. However, at an advanced stage of the landing roll, the flightdeck crew realised that the remaining distance might not be sufficient for the plane to stop. To keep within the airfield's boundary, the flightdeck crew attempted to swing the aircraft to the left. Although this caused the aircraft to turn in the desired direction, it began sliding sideways, finally coming to a halt on an earth embankment. Despite extensive damage to the aircraft, there was no post-crash fire and none of the 23 occupants (four crew, 19 passengers) was injured. The subsequent accident investigation established inadequate braking as a result of inadequate friction provided by the aerodrome's very wet grass covering a hard, dry and almost impermeable sub-soil. Accident investigators also cited the flightdeck crew's failure to take into account the additional landing distance that was required to land an HS 748 safely on the wet grass strip as an important contributory factor.

The second mishap, involving HS 748-222 G-ATEH, occurred at 13.34 local time. The aircraft was operating that day's scheduled service from Guernsey to Portsmouth. A visual approach to Portsmouth Airport's grass strip 07 resulted in an unsuccessful attempt to land. A second attempt was made, resulting in the aircraft landing on strip 07. Immediately after touchdown, selection of ground fine propeller pitch was followed by application of brakes. Although this caused the aircraft to decelerate initially, subsequent braking proved ineffective due to the wet grass. As a consequence, the aircraft broke through the perimeter fence alongside the main road in the aerodrome's northeast corner, coming to a halt across the road. Despite extensive damage to the aircraft, there was no post-crash fire and none of the 66 occupants (four crew, 62 passengers) were injured. The subsequent accident investigation established inadequate braking as a result of inadequate friction provided by the aerodrome's very wet grass covering a hard, dry and almost impermeable sub-soil. Accident investigators also cited the flightdeck crew's failure to take into account the additional landing distance that was required to land an HS 748 safely on the wet grass strip as an important contributory factor. Both aircraft were subsequently repaired and returned to service.
