= Armstrong Whitworth Atalanta =

Airliner in Coventry Airport

AW.15 Atalanta
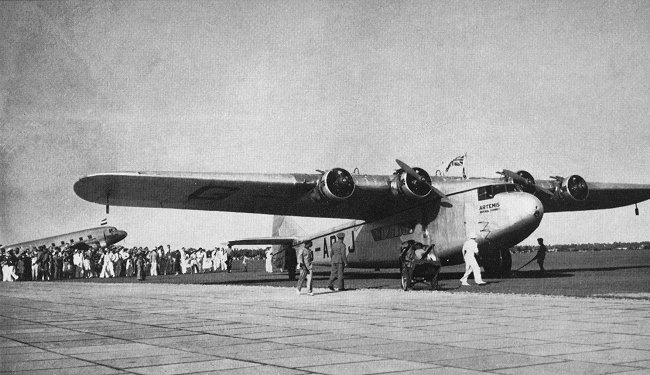
- AW.15 Atalanta "Artemis"

General information
- Type: Airliner
- Manufacturer: Sir W.G. Armstrong Whitworth Aircraft Limited
- Primary users: Imperial Airways Royal Air Force; Indian Air Force
- Number built: 8

History
- Introduction date: 1933
- First flight: 6 June 1932
- Retired: 1942

The Armstrong Whitworth AW.15 Atalanta was a four-engine airliner designed and produced by the British aircraft manufacturer Sir W.G. Armstrong Whitworth Aircraft Limited at Coventry.

The Atalanta was specifically developed to fulfil the needs of the British airline Imperial Airways, who sought a new four-engined airliner to serve its African routes. A monoplane configuration was adopted largely due to its low drag qualities, which led to a substantially different configuration to that of the preceding Armstrong Whitworth Argosy airliner. Upon its review of Armstrong Whitworth's proposal, Imperial Airways opted to order it into production before a prototype had even been assembled, much less flown.

On 6 June 1932, the prototype, G-ABPI, performed its maiden flight; it was named Atalanta, which was later applied to the whole class as well. Flying testing revealed only minor difficulties, many of which were rapidly resolved, enabling the aircraft to receive a certificate of airworthiness only three months later. On 26 September 1932, Imperial Airways operated the type's first commercial service from Croydon to Brussels and Cologne. The Atalanta primarily served the airline's Eastern routes as intended for five years before being displaced; in its later years, various other civil and military operators flew the type up until its withdrawal amid the Second World War.

== Development ==
=== Background ===
The origins of the AW.15 Atalanta can be largely attributed to the British airline Imperial Airways, specifically its release of a specification for a four-engined airliner to serve its African lines, in particular for the service between Kisumu in Kenya and Cape Town, South Africa, during 1930. According to aviation author Oliver Tapper, the airline had recognised that, in order to achieve the desired immunity from forced landings on account of the mid-flight failure of a single engine, it would be necessary to procure new airliners with four engines, rather than three engines such as the existing Armstrong Whitworth Argosy. Other requirements of Imperial Airways' specification include the ability to carry at least nine passengers, along with a crew of three and a payload of freight/mail across a distance of 400 mi (640 km), in addition to a cruising speed of 115 mph (185 km/h) at 9,000 ft (2,740 m).

At Sir W.G. Armstrong Whitworth Aircraft Limited, the aircraft designer John Lloyd reviewed this specification and quickly determined that the optimal means of fulfilling its requirements was the adoption of a monoplane configuration, which provided greater aerodynamic efficiency over a biplane counterpart. The basic concept represented a major departure from the preceding Argosy, featuring wing-mounted engines and a relatively streamlined fuselage. Internal studies, which included considerable use of wind tunnels, found that the proposed airliner would generate 340 lb of parasitic drag, less than half that of the Argosy.

=== Into flight ===
Armstrong Whitworth AW.15 Atalanta

Imperial Airways was impressed with the company's proposal, making the unusual decision to order it into production 'off the drawing board'. On 6 June 1932, the prototype, G-ABPI, performed its maiden flight, piloted by Alan Campbell-Orde. It received the individual name Atalanta, which subsequently was applied to the whole class as well. On 27 June 1932, the Atalanta had its first public appearance at the company's Society of British Aerospace Companies (SBAC) display at Hendon Aerodrome; according to Tapper, it was favourably received at the event.

On 11 July 1932, the prototype was dispatched to RAF Martlesham Heath for testing; it received its certificate of airworthiness during the following month. Flight testing had revelated the aircraft to possess relatively few flaws, with any teething problems that did present themselves being quickly overcome. It was noted, by pilots, to handle well and be easy to fly. Due to vibration from the engines, there were instances of fuel tanks splitting and bracing wires snapping, which was addressed by installing rubber mounts for the oil tanks and replacing the wire with steel tubing. One relatively minor criticism, but still within acceptable margins, was the occasional instance of rudder over-correction and oscillation: this was improved via the addition of what Armstrong Whitworth claimed to be the world's first spring tab.

The prototype was flown to Croydon Airport for customer acceptance trials with Imperial Airways, the airline being reportedly entirely satisfied by its performance. On 26 September 1932, the aircraft flew its first commercial service from Croydon to Brussels and Cologne. On 20 October 1932, the prototype was damaged during a test flight due to fuel starvation caused by a malfunctioning experimental vent on the fuel tank. Armstrong Whitworth was allegedly embarrassed by the incident and renamed the third production machine (G-ABTI, Arethusa) as Atalanta, apparently in the hope that nobody would notice the substitution.

Two derivatives of the Atalanta were proposed: the Jaguar-powered AW.25 and Panther-powered AW.26, but neither left the drawing board. Tapper attributes the failure for orders to emerge for successive variants to be down to unfortunate timing and the quick emergence of larger airliners from competing companies.

== Design ==
The Armstrong Whitworth Atalanta was a high-wing streamlined monoplane airliner. Its square-section fuselage was relatively clean and featured rounded edges to reduce drag. The aircraft's composite construction included steel, plywood and fabric. The undercarriage was fixed, but was partially enclosed within the fuselage and covered by streamlined fairings in order to minimise drag. Passengers were carried within a relatively quiet and cool cabin and provided with comfortable adjustable chairs. The overall design of the Atalanta was rather modern for the era; Century of Flight allege that the Atalanta somewhat closed the performance gap between British and American airliners.

The aircraft was powered by a total of four supercharged Armstrong Siddeley Serval III ten-cylinder radial engines, each capable of providing up to 340 hp (250 kW). This powerplant was a relatively recent development, each one basically being a pair of Armstrong Siddeley Mongoose engines joined. These engines, which were positioned on the leading edge of the wing, were faired into the wing profile for greater aerodynamic efficiency. They were mounted upon a tubular framework attached to the forward spar of the wing, which was protected from a potential engine fire by a fire-proof bulkhead. Both of the aircraft's two fuel tanks were accommodated within the wing's leading edge, one between each pair of engines, positioned as to permit fuel to be gravity fed.

The fuselage of the Atalanta comprised three sections. Its construction involved novel approaches for the company, such as the use of steel strips to form the longerons and interconnecting struts. The section of the fuselage containing the cabin was covered by plywood over light stringers, while the rear portion was covered almost entirely by fabric, save for the use of aluminium sheeting at the corners. The aircraft's cantilever wings, which were moderately tapered, were also built in three sections around two spars formed from steel girders. The wing's center section was supported by steel ribs, while the outer wing sections used wooden ribs along with a plywood covering was used up to the rear spar.

The interior of the Atalanta featured several novel features. The cockpit, which was crewed by a pair of pilots and a radio operator, was unusually large; immediately behind it was a compartment intended to accommodate up to one tonne of air mail. A luggage hold and a galley was positioned further behind that. The main cabin was designed to be adjustable, readily permitting operators to change the passenger-to-freight ratio. Imperial Airways initially opted to configure it with nine seats, arranged in alternating pairs and standalone, all of which with tables. Particular attention was paid to the air conditioning systems due to the type's envisioned frequent use within relatively hot climates. Later on, Imperial Airways adopted a more profitable eleven seat configuration for its African route.

== Operational history ==
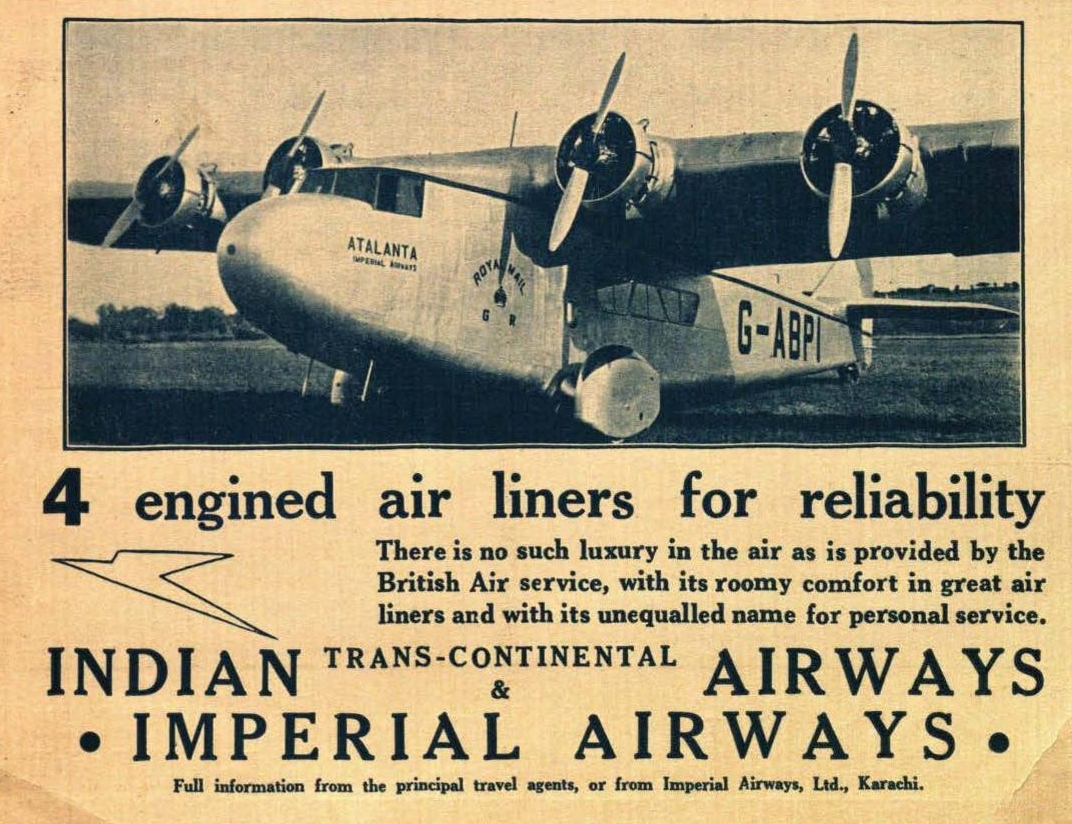
G-ABPI in the service of Imperial Airways in 1936

Imperial Airways ordered eight aircraft, all of which had been delivered by 1933. The first service was flown from Croydon Airport to Brussels and then Cologne on 26 September 1932. The prototype G-ABPI left Croydon Airport on 5 January 1933 on a proving flight to Cape Town, South Africa. Three other aircraft joined it in South Africa to fly the service between Cape Town and Kisumu. Demand on the route was such that the Atalanta proved to lack sufficient capacity, thus necessitating its substitution by the de Havilland Hercules.

On 1 July 1933, an Atalanta flew the first direct air mail service between London and Karachi. Two Indian-registered and two British-registered aircraft operated a Karachi-Calcutta service with was later extended to Rangoon and Singapore. On 29 May 1933, G-ABTL flew through to Melbourne, Australia (arriving on 30 June) on a route survey flight. During December 1934, the through service to Australia commenced. In subsequent years, Imperial Airways studied various other potential routes for the type, including to China.

During 1937, Imperial Airways opted to withdraw the Atalanta from its African routes. Shortly thereafter, a pair of aircraft were leased by Wilson Airways for operations in Kenya until July 1938. The African Atalantas were then transferred to India. A total of three aircraft were lost prior to the outbreak of the Second World War.

Shortly after the conflict's start, the remaining five Atalantas were initially taken over by British Overseas Airways Corporation (BOAC). During March 1941, they were impressed into use by the Royal Air Force (RAF) in India, where they were used to ferry reinforcements to Iraq in response to the Rashid Ali uprising.

During December 1941, shortly following Japan's entry into the war, the fleet was handed over to the Indian Air Force for use on coastal reconnaissance duties, armed with a single .303 in (7.7 mm) machine gun operated by the navigator. The final patrol by the type was flown on 30 August 1942, while the two survivors were transferred to transport duties where they continued in use until June 1944.

== Operators ==
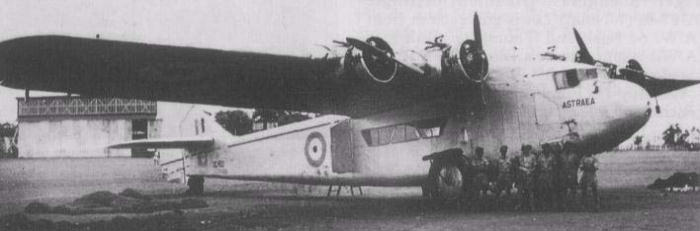
AW.15 Atalanta, originally G-ABTL Astraea, impressed as DG450 to serve with No 1 (Madras) and No 3 (Calcutta) Flights, IAF, until August 1942

=== Civil operators ===
India

- Indian Trans-Continental Airways

Kenya

- Wilson Airways

United Kingdom

- British Overseas Airways Corporation
- Imperial Airways

=== Military operators ===
India

- Indian Air Force

United Kingdom

- Royal Air Force
  - No. 24 Squadron RAF

=== Aircraft names and registrations ===
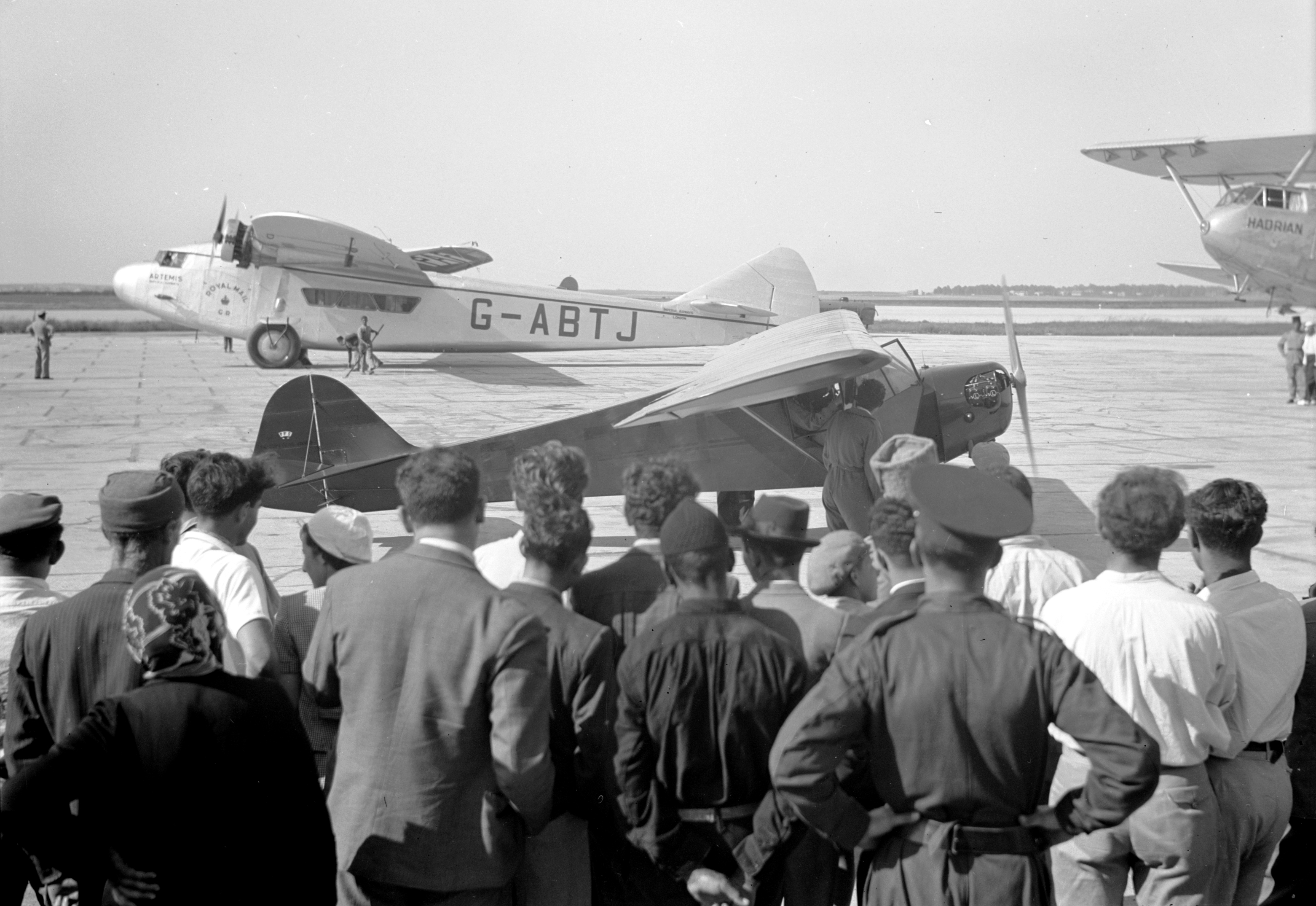
Artemis at Lydda Airport, 1939

- Atalanta (c/n 740; G-ABPI, renamed Arethusa; later VT-AEF, DG453)
- Andromeda (c/n 741; G-ABTH)
- Arethusa (c/n 742; G-ABTI, renamed Atalanta; later DG451)
- Artemis (c/n 743; G-ABTJ; later DG452)
- Athena (c/n 744; G-ABTK)
- Astraea (c/n 784; G-ABTL; later DG450)
- Amalthea (c/n 785; G-ABTG)
- Aurora (c/n 786; G-ABTM, later VT-AEG, DG454)

== Specifications ==
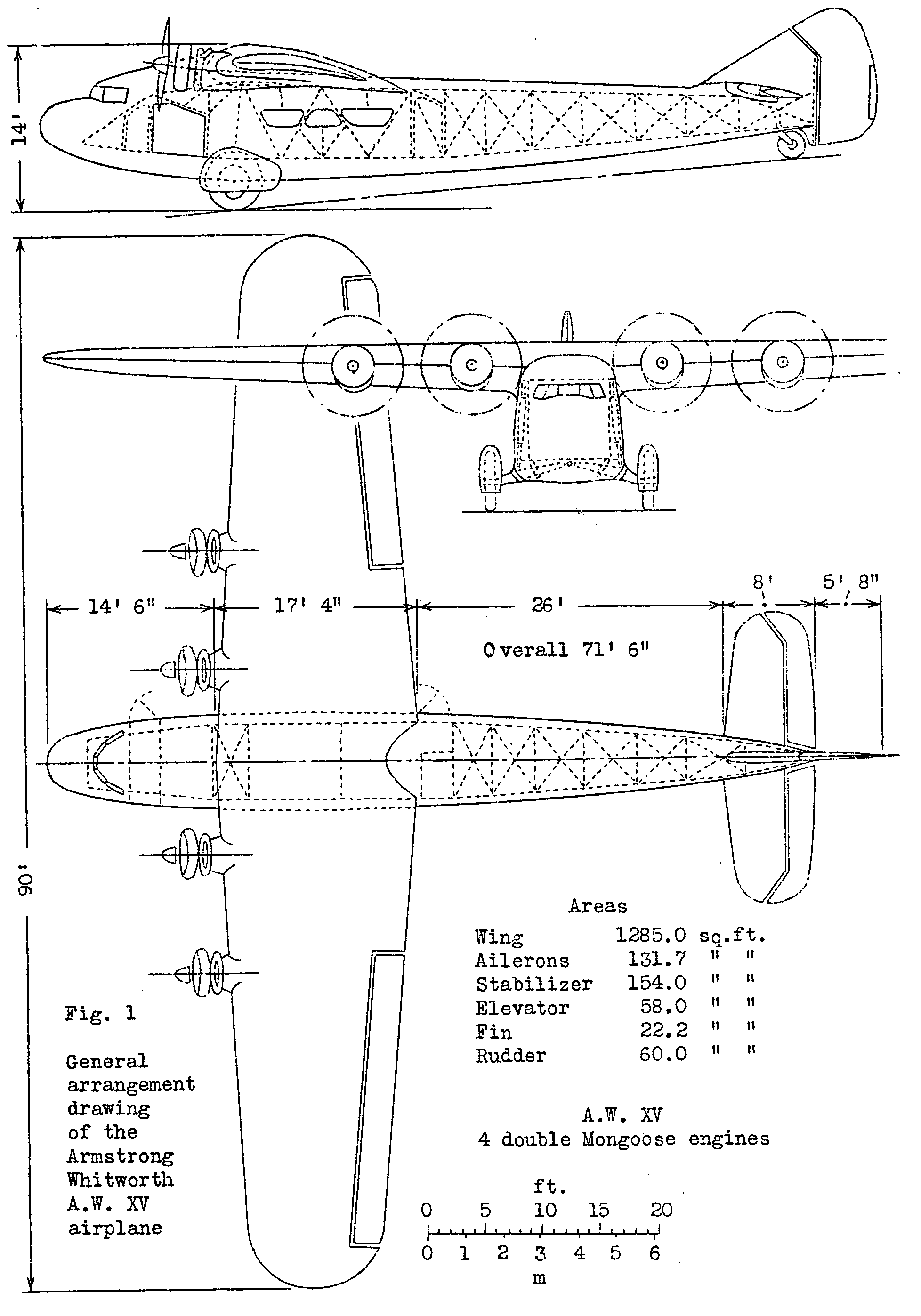
Armstrong Whitworth A.W.XV Atalanta 3-view drawing from NACA-AC-167

Data from Armstrong Whitworth Aircraft since 1913

General characteristics

- Crew: 3
- Capacity: 9–17 passengers
- Length: 71 ft 6 in (21.79 m)
- Wingspan: 90 ft 0 in (27.43 m)
- Height: 14 ft 0 in (4.27 m) (Note: Tail down. Height tail up: 15 ft 0 in)
- Wing area: 1,285 sq ft (119.4 m^{2})
- Airfoil: Göttingen 387
- Empty weight: 14,832 lb (6,728 kg)
- Max takeoff weight: 21,000 lb (9,525 kg)
- Fuel capacity: 324 imp gal (389 US gal; 1,470 L)
- Powerplant: 4 × Armstrong Siddeley Serval III ten-cylinder two-row air-cooled radial engine, 340 hp (250 kW) each
- Propellers: 2-bladed wooden fixed-pitch propeller, 8 ft 3 in (2.51 m) diameter

Performance

- Maximum speed: 156 mph (251 km/h, 136 kn) at 3,000 ft (910 m)
- Cruise speed: 118 mph (190 km/h, 103 kn) at 9,000 ft (2,700 m)
- Stall speed: 51 mph (82 km/h, 44 kn)
- Range: 640 mi (1,030 km, 560 nmi)
- Service ceiling: 14,200 ft (4,300 m)
- Rate of climb: 700 ft/min (3.6 m/s)
- Time to altitude: 21.5 min to 9,000 ft (2,700 m)

== See also ==
Related lists

- List of aircraft of Imperial Airways
