= Hawker Tomtit =

1928 trainer aircraft series by Hawker

Tomtit
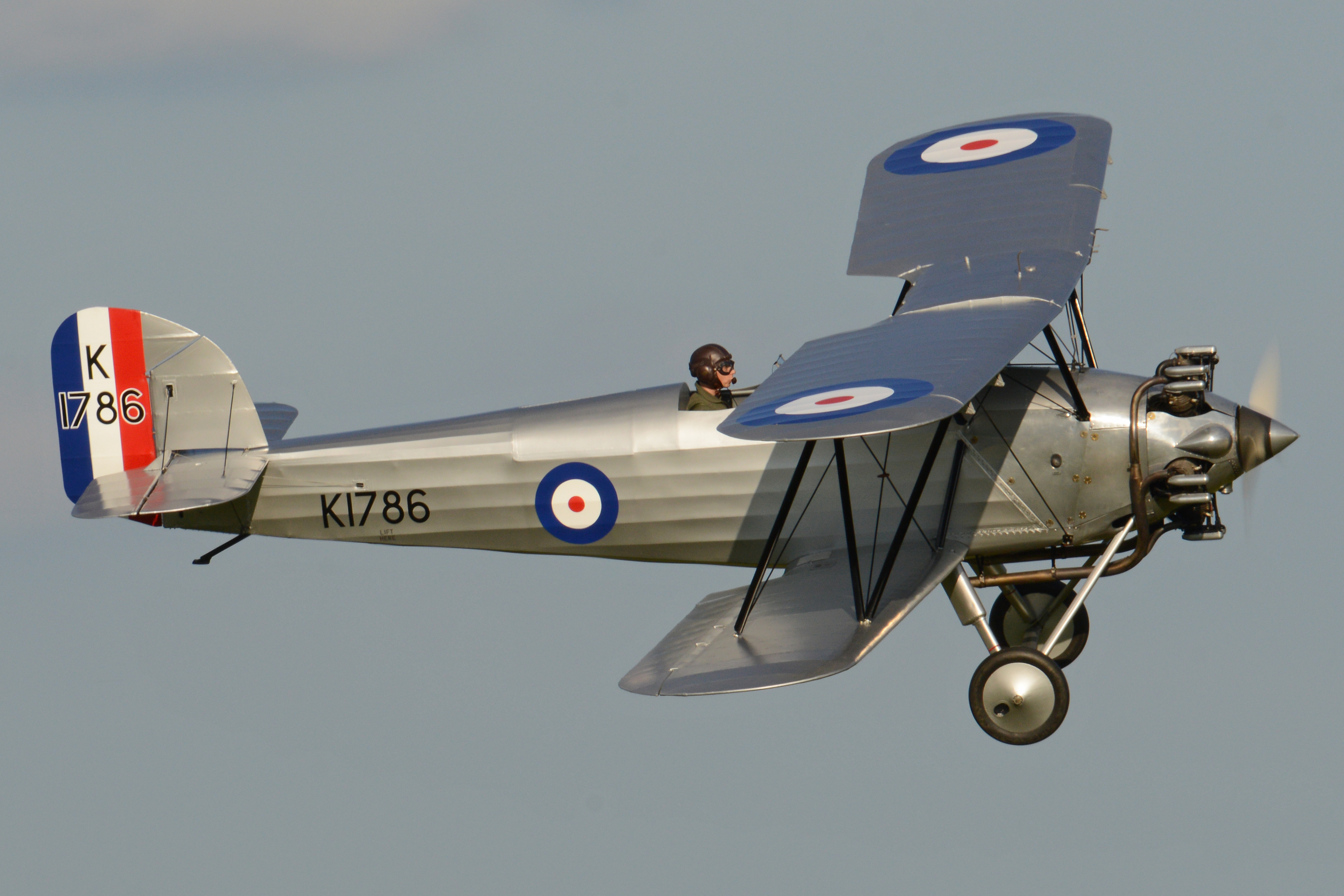
- Shuttleworth's Tomtit G-AFTA at Old Warden

General information
- Type: Trainer
- Manufacturer: Hawker Aircraft
- Number built: 36

History
- First flight: November 1928

The Hawker Tomtit is a British training biplane from the late 1920s.

== Design and development ==
The Royal Air Force in 1927 required a replacement for their current elementary trainers, the elderly Avro 504Ns. They specified that the power plant should be an Armstrong Siddeley Mongoose engine, a radial five-cylinder type, and the design should "have regards to the elimination of the Woodworking Fitter trades." In other words: the airframe, though not its covering had to be metal. This led Sydney Camm, then chief designer at Hawker to design the Tomtit, a single bay biplane whose frame was of steel and duralumin tubes. The spars were made of tubular dumbbell sections, the whole aircraft fabric covered. Automatic slats of the Handley Page type were fitted to the leading edges of the upper wing. It had the standard fixed main wheel and tail-skid undercarriage of its day. The engine was uncowled.

Instructor and trainee sat in open tandem cockpits. The latter, at the rear, was provided with the new blind flying panel and a cockpit hood was fitted so blind flying instruction was possible. The RAF Tomtits had 150 hp (112 kW) Mongoose IIIC motors. The prototype (J9772) was first flown by George Bulman from Brooklands in November 1928. Hawker also produced five civil registered Tomtits. The first two of these started with a Mongoose IIIA engine and the third with an upright in-line 115 hp (86 kW) A.D.C. Cirrus Major. It was thought that this latter, lower power engine choice might appeal more to public sporting owners. Three of these aircraft were later owned by Wolseley, who fitted them with their cowled A.R. 7 and A.R.9 radial motors.

== Production and service ==
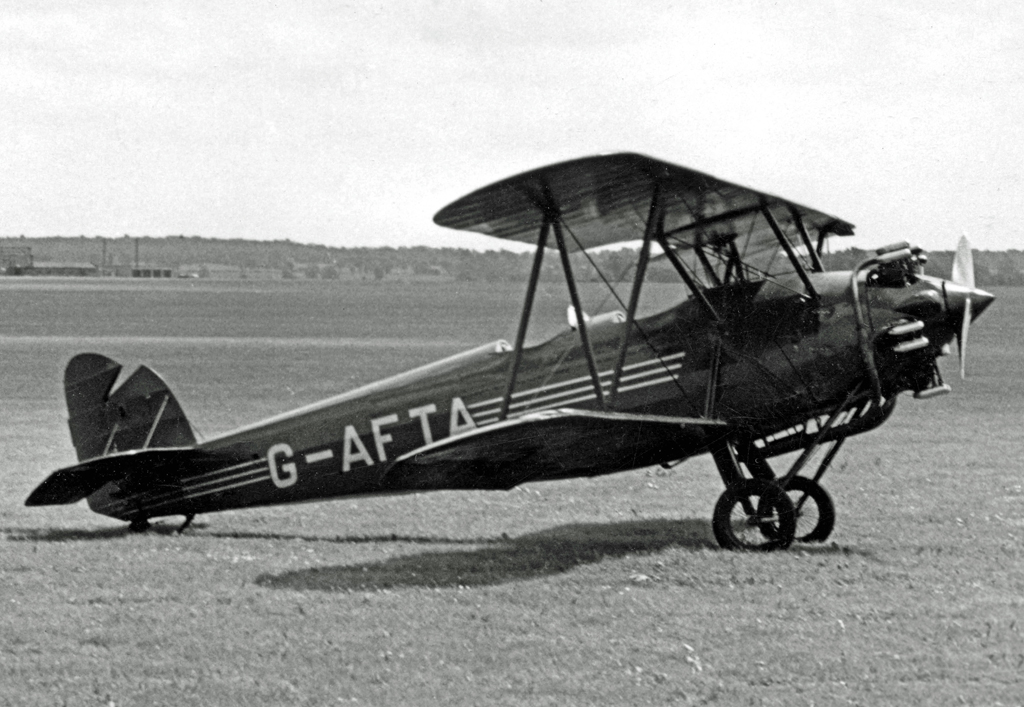
Hawker Aircraft's Tomtit in 1954 wearing their dark blue and gold house colours

Between 1928 and 1931, 24 aircraft were delivered to the RAF for evaluation. After the first batch of ten, two more batches of six and eight aircraft respectively were ordered. The competition included the eventual winner, the Avro Tutor. Military Tomtits were sold elsewhere, two to Canada and four to New Zealand. Despite its failure to win the RAF contract, it is probable that more Tomtits could have been sold as it was very well received by their pilots but Hawker were very busy producing the Hawker Hart and its many variants and did not have the capacity to manufacture other aircraft. The Cirrus-powered machine had turned out to be rather underpowered and lacking the control precision of the standard aircraft.

In 1935 some nine ex-RAF aircraft joined the original five on the civil register. They were used by individuals and clubs as sports and training machines. On 4 February 1941, three surplus Tomtits were acquired from Leicester Aero Club by Alex Henshaw, chief test pilot at the Vickers-Armstrongs Castle Bromwich aircraft factory for use as personal transport until mid-1942. G-AFIB was destroyed in a night take-off accident during the war and G-AFVV was destroyed at some point soon after the war. G-AFTA survived the war, was sold by Henshaw in 1946 but then acquired and restored by the Hawker company in 1949. This was donated to the Shuttleworth Collection at Old Warden in 1960 and is still airworthy there today.

== Variants ==
Tomtit
Two-seat training, club, sports and personal aircraft.
Tomtit Mk I
Two-seat primary trainer for the RAF.

== Military operators ==
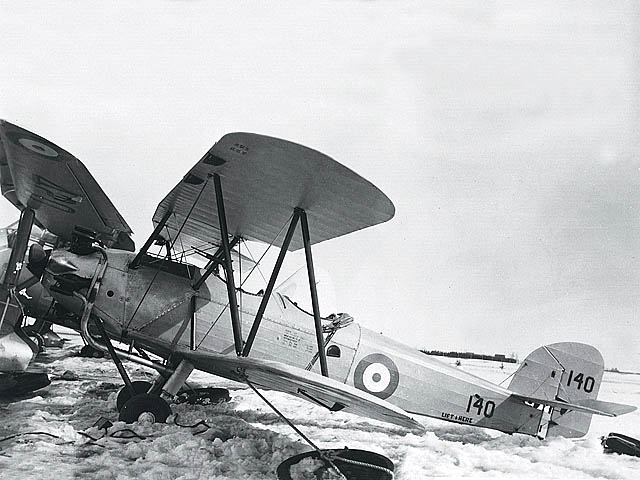
Hawker Tomtit of the R.C.A.F.

Canada

- Royal Canadian Air Force - 2 aircraft.
  - No. 7 Squadron RCAF
  - No. 12 Squadron RCAF

New Zealand

- Royal New Zealand Air Force - 4 aircraft.
  - Pilot Training School

United Kingdom

- Royal Air Force - 24 aircraft.
  - No. 24 Squadron RAF
  - No. 3 Flying Training School
  - Central Flying School

== Surviving aircraft ==
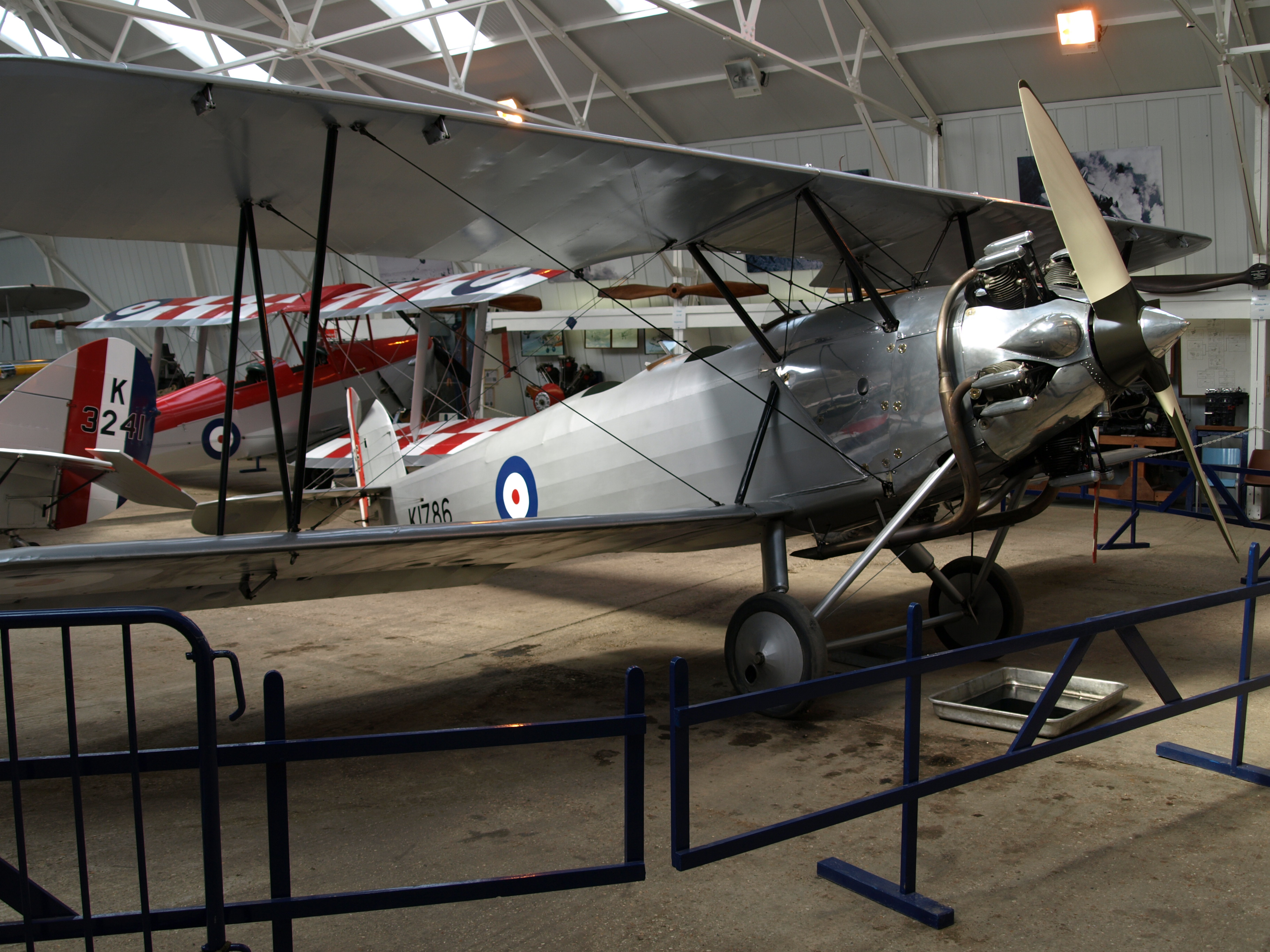
Airworthy Hawker Tomtit G-AFTA with the Shuttleworth Collection at Old Warden

One Tomtit still flies, the ex-RAF K1786 G-AFTA. This, the last RAF machine to be completed in January 1931, initially served with No. 3 Flying Training School. It joined the UK civil register in April 1939. During the war, it was flown by Alex Henshaw and gained a Spitfire windscreen and faired headrest. After purchase and restoration by Hawker in 1949, it became the mount of company test pilot Neville Duke and was repainted dark blue and gold. In 1960, it was handed over to the Shuttleworth Collection, who returned it to its original RAF colours in 1967.

== Specifications (Tomtit) ==
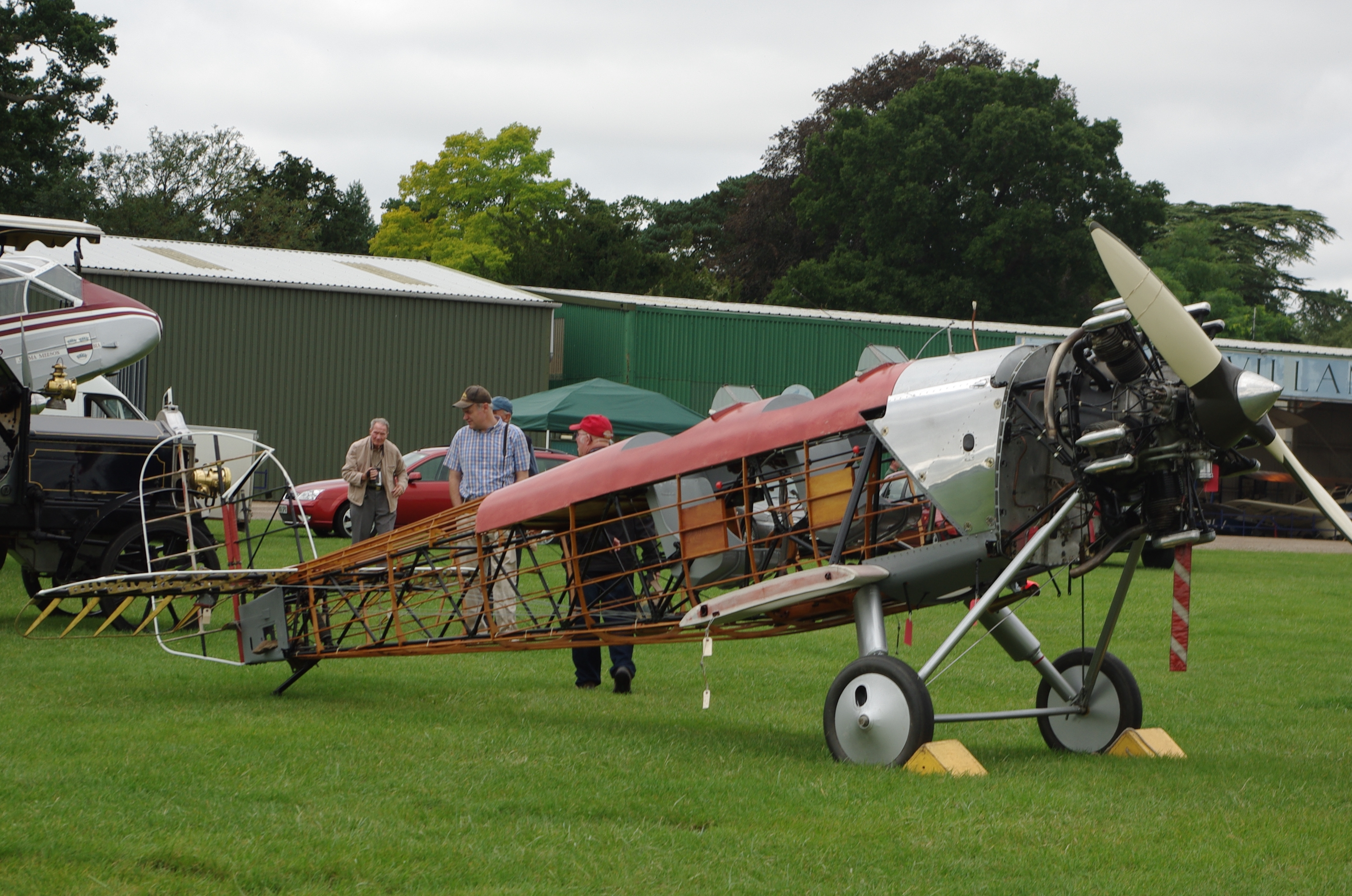
Hawker Tomtit G-AFTA (K1786) undergoing restoration and displaying construction details at the 2013 Shuttleworth Uncovered event

Data from

General characteristics

- Crew: 2
- Length: 23 ft 8 in (7.21 m)
- Wingspan: 28 ft 6 in (8.69 m)
- Height: 8 ft 8 in (2.64 m)
- Wing area: 238 sq ft (22.1 m^{2})
- Empty weight: 1,100 lb (499 kg)
- Gross weight: 1,750 lb (794 kg)
- Powerplant: 1 × Armstrong Siddeley Mongoose IIIC 5-cylinder radial engine, 150 hp (110 kW)

Performance

- Maximum speed: 124 mph (200 km/h, 108 kn) at 1,000 ft (300 m)
- Range: 350 mi (560 km, 300 nmi)
- Service ceiling: 19,500 ft (5,900 m)
- Rate of climb: 1,000 ft/min (5.1 m/s)
- Time to altitude: 14.5 min to 10,000 ft (3,000 m)
