= Wolseley Aquarius =

1930s British piston aircraft engine

Aquarius/A.R.7
- Type: Radial aero engine
- Manufacturer: Wolseley Motors Limited
- First run: 1933
- Major applications: Hawker Tomtit

The Wolseley Aquarius I or A.R.7 was a British seven-cylinder, air-cooled radial aero engine that first ran in 1933, it was designed and built by Wolseley Motors. Intended for the military trainer aircraft market few were produced, as Wolseley withdrew from the aero engine market in 1936.

== Applications ==
- Hawker Tomtit

== Specifications (A.R.7) ==
Data from Lumsden.

=== General characteristics ===
- Type: 7-cylinder, single row, radial engine
- Bore: 4.188 in (106 mm)
- Stroke: 4.75 in (120 mm)
- Displacement: 458 cu in (7.5 L)
- Length: 36.4 in (925 mm)
- Diameter: 40.25 in (1,029 mm)
- Dry weight: 375 lb (170 kg)

=== Components ===
- Valvetrain: Overhead valve
- Fuel type: Petrol
- Cooling system: Air-cooled
- Reduction gear: Direct drive, left-hand tractor

=== Performance ===
- Power output: 170 hp (127 kW) at 2,475 rpm (maximum power)
- Specific power: 0.37 hp/cu in (16.9 kw/L)
- Compression ratio: 5.35:1
- Power-to-weight ratio: 0.45 hp/lb (0.75 kW/kg)

== See also ==
Comparable engines

- Armstrong Siddeley Lynx
- Warner Scarab

Related lists

- List of aircraft engines
