= Armstrong Siddeley Serval =

1920s British piston aircraft engine

Serval/Double Mongoose
- Type: Radial engine
- National origin: United Kingdom
- Manufacturer: Armstrong Siddeley
- First run: 1928
- Major applications: Armstrong Whitworth Atalanta; Saro Cloud

The Armstrong Siddeley Serval was a British ten-cylinder aero engine developed by Armstrong Siddeley in the late 1920s. Following company tradition, the engine was named for the serval.

== Design and development ==
The Serval was a ten-cylinder, double-row, air-cooled radial piston engine. It was developed from the Armstrong Siddeley Mongoose and was, more or less, two Mongooses built around a single crankcase; indeed it first appeared as the Double Mongoose in May 1928.

Built in several variants, power output was about 340 hp (254 kW).

== Variants ==
Serval I initially Double Mongoose

(1931) 340 hp.
Serval III
(1932)
Serval IIIB
(1932) 310 hp.
Serval IV
310 hp.
Serval V
(1933) 340 hp.

== Applications ==
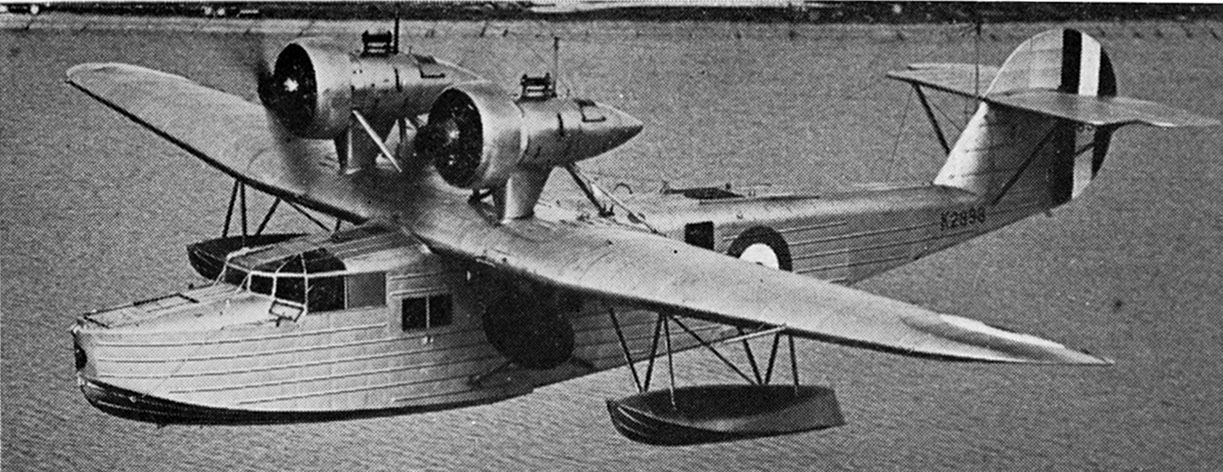
AS Serval powered Saro Cloud

- Airco DH.9
- Armstrong Whitworth Atalanta
- BFW M.36
- Canadian Vickers Vancouver
- Fairey Fox
- ICAR Comercial
- Saro Cloud
- Stampe et Vertongen SV.5 Tornado

== Specifications (Serval I) ==
Data from Lumsden.

=== General characteristics ===
- Type: 10-cylinder double-row radial
- Bore: 5 in (127 mm)
- Stroke: 5.5 in (139.7 mm)
- Displacement: 1,080 cu in (17.7 L)
- Length: 54.25 in (1,378 mm)
- Diameter: 45.6 in (1,158 mm)
- Dry weight: 714 lb (324 kg)

=== Components ===
- Valvetrain: Overhead poppet valves
- Fuel type: 77 Octane petrol
- Cooling system: Air-cooled
- Reduction gear: Direct drive, Left hand tractor

=== Performance ===
- Power output: 340 hp at 2,000 rpm at sea level
- Compression ratio: 5:1
- Power-to-weight ratio: 0.47 hp/lb

== See also ==
Related development

- Armstrong Siddeley Mongoose

Related lists

- List of aircraft engines
