= Fokker S.IV =

Dutch trainer aircraft

S.IV
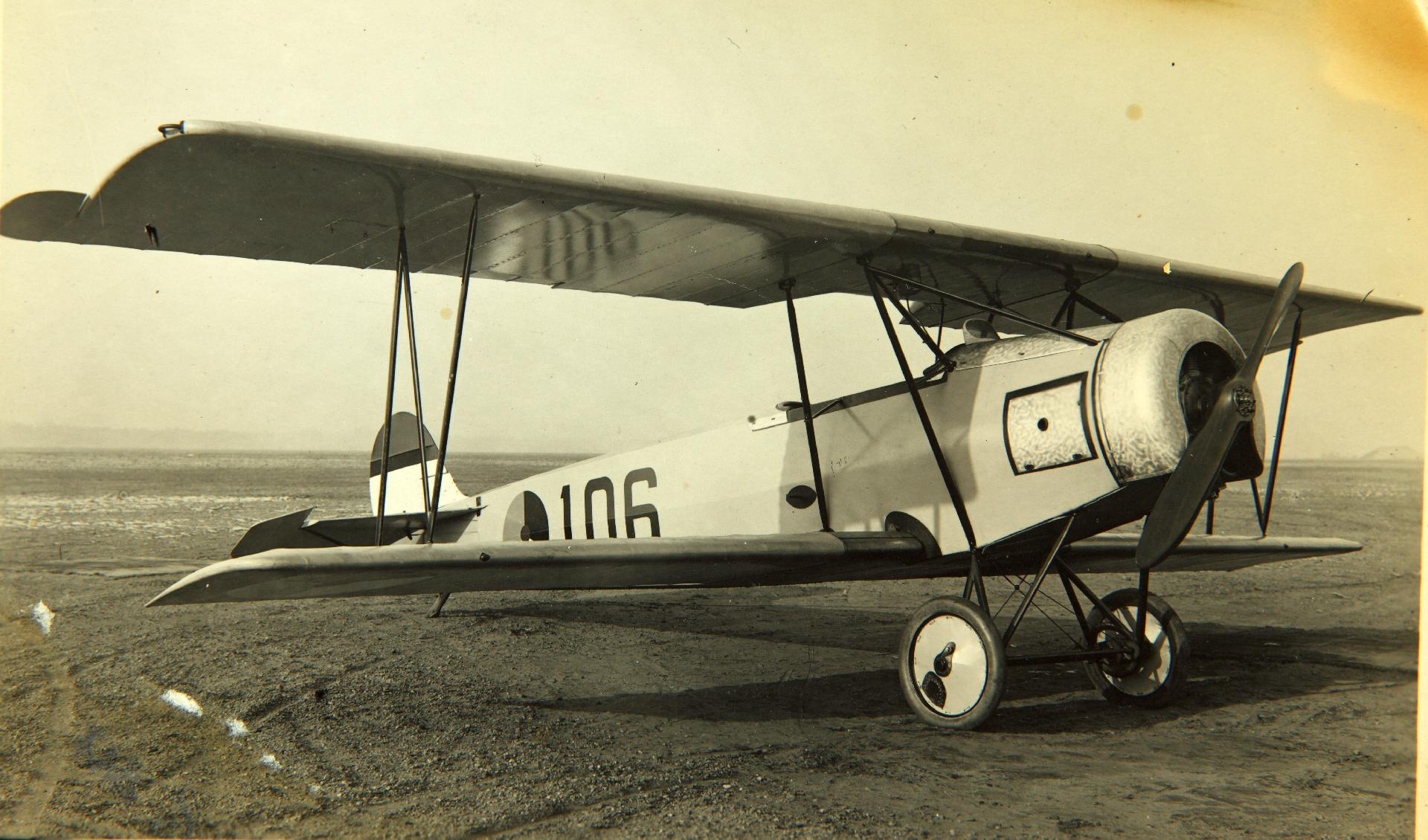

General information
- Type: Trainer
- Manufacturer: Fokker
- Primary user: Royal Netherlands Army Aviation Group
- Number built: 31

History
- First flight: 1924

The Fokker S.IV was a military trainer aircraft produced in the Netherlands in the mid-1920s. It was a conventional, single-bay biplane with staggered wings of unequal span braced with N-struts, essentially a radial-engined development of the S.III. The pilot and instructor sat in tandem, open cockpits and the undercarriage was of fixed, tailskid type with a cross-axle between the main units. The Royal Netherlands Army Aviation Group purchased 30 examples and used them right up to the German invasion of the Netherlands in 1940. On 14 May that year, a few surviving S.IVs escaped to France alongside some S.IX trainers, but never flew again.

The S.IV could be powered by a variety of engines in the 75–97 kW (100–130 hp) range, including 110 hp (82 kW) Siemens-Halske Sh 11, 110 hp (82 kW) Le Rhône 9J, 130 hp (97 kW) Bristol Lucifer, 130 hp (97 kW) Armstrong-Siddeley Mongoose, 110 hp (82 kW) Oberursel UR.II or the 130 hp (97 kW) Clerget 9B.

== Units using this aircraft/Operators (choose) ==
Netherlands

- Royal Netherlands Air Force

== Specifications ==
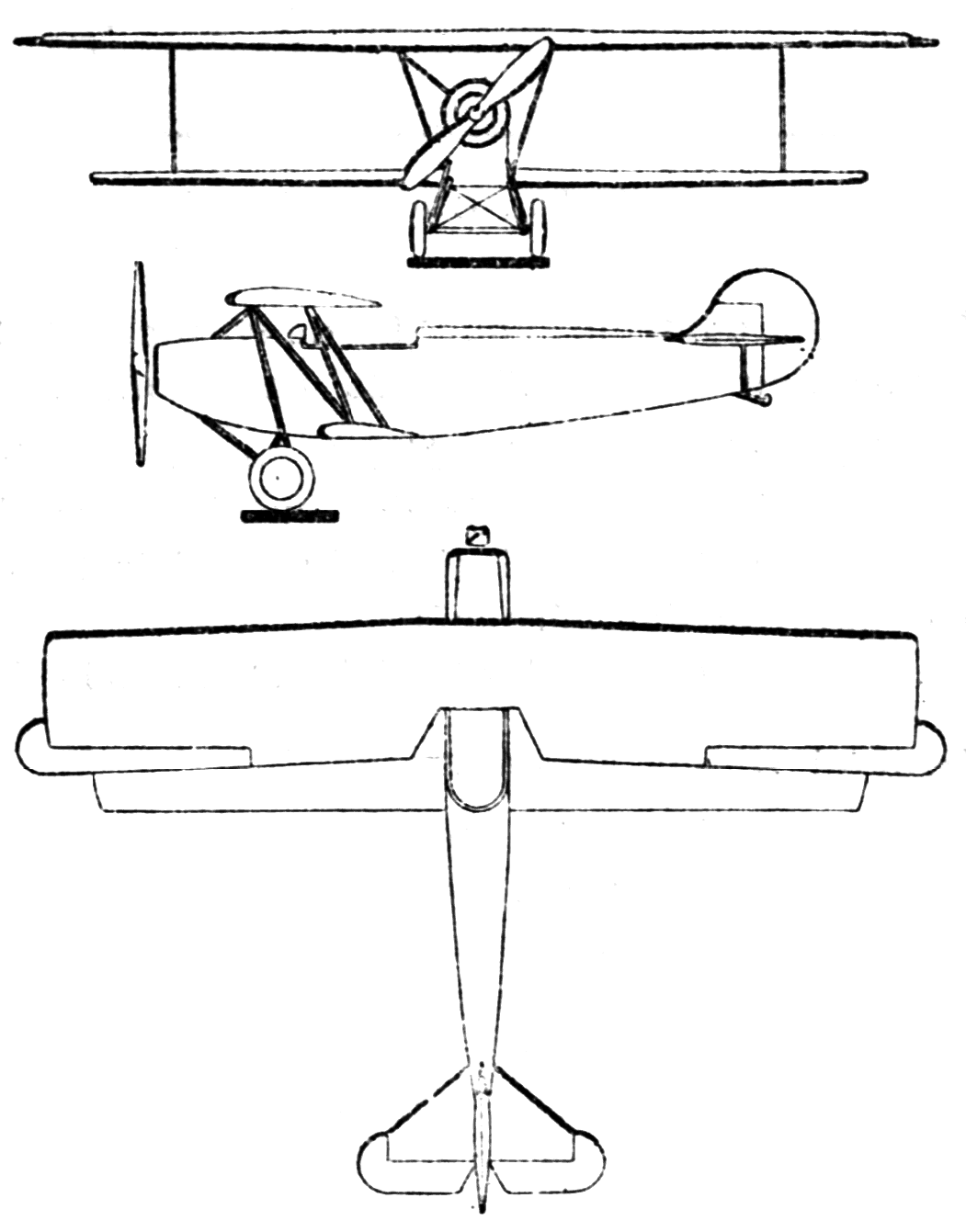
Fokker S.IV 3-view drawing from Le Document aéronautique March,1927

Data from Jane's all the World's Aircraft 1928

General characteristics

- Crew: 2
- Length: 8.55 m (28 ft 1 in)
- Wingspan: 11.17 m (36 ft 8 in)
- Height: 3.15 m (10 ft 4 in)
- Wing area: 27.55 m^{2} (296.5 sq ft)
- Empty weight: 650 kg (1,433 lb)
- Gross weight: 1,000 kg (2,205 lb)
- Powerplant: 1 × Le Rhône 9J 9-cylinder air-cooled rotary piston engine, 82 kW (110 hp)
- Propellers: 2-bladed fixed pitch propeller

Performance

- Maximum speed: 160 km/h (99 mph, 86 kn)
- Stall speed: 65 km/h (40 mph, 35 kn)
- Service ceiling: 4,000 m (13,000 ft)
- Time to altitude: 1,000 m (3,300 ft) in 6 minutes
- Wing loading: 36.29 kg/m^{2} (7.43 lb/sq ft)
- Power/mass: 0.0830 kW/kg (0.0505 hp/lb)
