= Wolseley Aries =

1930s British piston aircraft engine

A.R.9/Aries/Scorpio
- Wolseley Scorpio Mk II
- Type: Radial aero engine
- Manufacturer: Wolseley Motors Limited
- First run: 1933
- Major applications: Airspeed Envoy; Hawker Tomtit

The Wolseley Aries III or A.R.9 was a British nine-cylinder, air-cooled radial aero engine that first ran in 1933, it was designed and built by Wolseley Motors. Intended for the military trainer aircraft market few were produced as Wolseley withdrew from the aero engine market in 1936.

A larger capacity version was known as the Wolseley Scorpio. Further-enlarged versions, the Leo and Libra, were test run but did not fly.

== Variants ==
A.R.9 Mk I
203 horsepower (151 kW).
A.R.9 Mk II
205 horsepower (153 kW). Higher permissible rpm version of Mk I.
A.R.9 Aries Mk III
225 horsepower (168 kW), low boost supercharger fitted.
Scorpio I
250 horsepower (186 kW), (230 bhp at 2,250 rpm), increased bore (111mm x 120 mm) to give a displacement of 9,477 cc, increased compression ratio. Reduction gearing.
Scorpio II and III
250 horsepower (186 kW), designed to run on 87 octane fuel with 6.5:1 ratio.
Leo
280 horsepower (209 kW), few details, not flown or produced.
Libra
390 hp at 6,000 ft. 725 lbs (329 kg). Tested but not flown or produced.

== Applications ==
- Airspeed Envoy
- Hawker Tomtit

== Specifications (A.R.9 Aries Mk III) ==
Data from Lumsden

=== General characteristics ===
- Type: 9-cylinder, single row, radial engine
- Bore: 4.19 in (106 mm)
- Stroke: 4.75 in (120 mm)
- Displacement: 588.6 cu in (9.654 L)
- Length: 42 in (1,067 mm)
- Diameter: 41.25 in (1,048 mm)
- Dry weight: 510 lb (231 kg)

=== Components ===
- Valvetrain: Overhead valve
- Supercharger: Single speed, geared induction fan, slight positive pressure
- Fuel type: Petrol
- Cooling system: Air-cooled
- Reduction gear: Epicyclic spur geared, right-hand tractor, reduction ratio 0.629:1

=== Performance ===
- Power output: 225 hp (168 kW) at 2,475 rpm (maximum power)
- Specific power: 0.38 hp/cu in (17.4 kw/L)
- Compression ratio: 5.35:1
- Power-to-weight ratio: 0.49 hp/lb (0.72 kW/kg)

== See also ==
Comparable engines

- Alvis Leonides
- Lycoming R-680

Related lists

- List of aircraft engines
