= Airspeed Envoy =

1930s British light aircraft

AS.6 Envoy
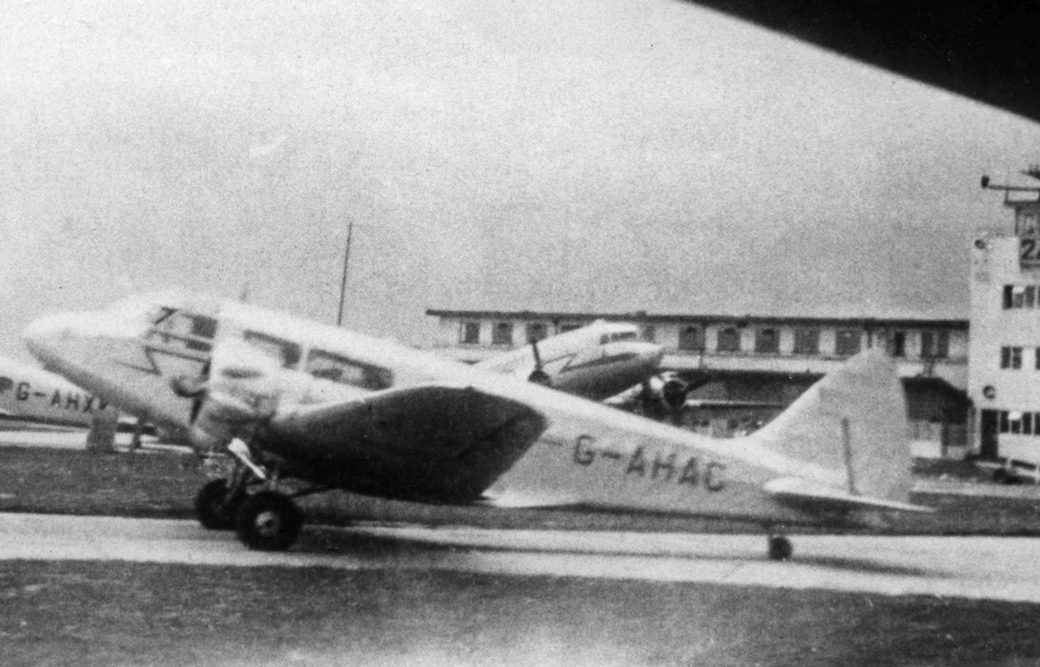
- The last surviving Airspeed Envoy, operated by Private Charter Ltd at Manchester (Ringway) Airport in 1948

General information
- Type: Transport
- National origin: United Kingdom
- Manufacturer: Airspeed Ltd
- Designer: A. H. Tiltman
- Number built: 52

History
- Manufactured: 1934–1939
- Introduction date: 1934
- First flight: 26 June 1934
- Retired: 1951
- Variants: Airspeed Viceroy; Airspeed Oxford.

The Airspeed AS.6 Envoy was a twin-engined light transport aircraft designed and produced by the British aircraft manufacturer Airspeed Ltd.

The Envoy originated as a heavier twin-engine derivative of Airspeed's Courier light transport aircraft. Sharing much of its design with this earlier aircraft, it was relatively easy to develop; confidence in the project was so high that within a week of the prototype's maiden flight, it was performing as a display aircraft to the public. Quantity production of the Envoy had been initiated even before this first flight. Early on, Airspeed worked closely with the British engine manufacturer Wolseley Motors as both a key supplier and early custom of the Envoy; development subsequently branched out to a wide variety of engines and configurations.

The majority of Envoys were produced by Airspeed at their facility at Portsmouth Aerodrome, Hampshire. The type was also produced overseas in Japan by Mitsubishi following the acquisition of a licence at the company's Nagoya factory; it was locally known as the Mitsubishi Hinazuru-type Passenger Transport. While many customers of the Envoy were in the civilian sector, where it was used for a variety of purposes from air racing to operating as an airliner, it also found an audience with military operators. The Convertible Envoy was developed for South Africa, which sought a model that could be rapidly reconfigured between civilian and military duties, being outfitted for use as a light bomber and reconnaissance aircraft for the latter capacity. The Envoy served as the basis for the Airspeed Oxford, a militarised trainer aircraft operated in large numbers by the Allies in and around the Second World War.

== Development ==
During the early 1930s, Airspeed successfully introduced the innovative Courier, the first British aircraft to feature a retractable undercarriage. Very quickly following the first flight, the company's management recognised that a logical follow-up project would be an enlarged derivative powered by twin engines, involving considerably less design work than an equivalent clean sheet initiative. The design effort was headed by co-founder A. H. (Hessell) Tiltman; during November 1933, Airspeed's board authorised the project to proceed. By January 1934, six aircraft, including the prototype, were at various stages of construction.

On 26 June 1934, the prototype, G-ACMT, performed its maiden flight, piloted by C. H. A. Colman. One week later, confidence in the prototype was so high that Airspeed decided to dispatch it for its first public appearance, an exhibition by the Society of British Aircraft Constructors (SBAC) at Hendon. By September 1934, the prototype was undergoing airworthiness certification testing at RAF Martlesham Heath. Furthermore, work was progressing well on a specialised racing variant of the aircraft, the Airspeed Viceroy.

Originally, Airspeed worked closely with British engine manufacturer Wolseley Motors on the Envoy; it was originally designed to work with the latter's Wolseley Aries engine. This partnership involved, amongst other aspects, the first two Envoys being sold to Wolseley and its owner Lord Nuffield. The prototype, and several early production aircraft, were powered by Aries engines; however, the prototype was subsequently reengined with the Wolseley Scorpio (amongst other changes) during early 1936.

Wolseley abruptly decided to cease aircraft engine manufacture in September 1936 as a result of the bureaucratic requirements of the Air Ministry being considered excessive by Lord Nuffield. Accordingly, Airspeed decided to adapt the aircraft to work with a variety of different engines. This decision led to customers being offered a choice of various engines to power their aircraft; these powerplants included the Aries, Armstrong Siddeley Cheetah V or Armstrong Siddeley Lynx IVC radial engines.

Early on, Airspeed promoted the Envoy by entering individual aircraft in air races and performing numerous long-distance flights. The specialised Viceroy derivative, being tailored towards racing, was used in this promotional campaign as well. Production of the Envoy was produced in three distinct series; initial production aircraft lacked several of the features present on later-built examples, such as trailing edge flaps. Seventeen Series I Envoys were completed, followed by thirteen Series II aircraft (equipped with split flaps) and the improved Series III, of which nineteen were constructed. Akin to the preceding Courier, a 'colonial' model of the Envoy was developed for overseas customers.

== Design ==
The Airspeed Envoy was a twin-engined low-wing cabin monoplane of all-wood construction apart from fabric covered control surfaces. It had a rearward retracting main undercarriage with a fixed tailwheel. Having been designed from the onset as a twin-engined development of the company's earlier Courier, numerous commonalities were shared between the two aircraft, including near-identical wooden construction, the same outer wing panels and the main undercarriage.

The airframe had a plywood exterior while the structure was composed of wood as well and was considered to be conventional for the era. In a typical configuration, the cabin could accommodate eight passengers along with a single pilot, while the Envoy's normal fuel capacity was 78 gallons, accommodated within a pair of aluminium tanks in the centre section. A separate aft compartment was normally used to store baggage, accessible via an exterior door on the starboard side of the aircraft. If the optional lavatory was installed, a reduced maximum capacity of six passengers was necessary. Passenger access to the cabin was via a single door on the port side of the aircraft.

The wing of Envoy changed between models, with early-built aircraft not featuring flaps unlike later production models. It also featured outboard extension wings, which could optionally accommodate a pair of additional 30 gallon fuel tanks to extend the aircraft's range. The wing's center section was integral with the aircraft's semi-monocoque fuselage, possessing an aspect ratio of 8.16, a mean dihedral of 5 degrees, and an incidence of 2 degrees at the fuselage.

The Envoy was powered by a range of engines across its various models. While initial aircraft were furnished with a pair of Wolseley Aries engines, other models were equipped with powerplants such as the Armstrong Siddeley Cheetah V and Armstrong Siddeley Lynx IVC radial engines. Regardless of the engine used, each was accommodated within an appropriate cowling, typically a short chord Townend ring, but also wider chord cowlings with and without blisters for cylinder heads.

== Operational history ==
=== Civilian use ===
The first production Envoy I, G-ACVH, flew in October 1934 and was used as a company demonstrator. The second, also a Series I but fitted with Wolseley Aries III radial engines, was delivered to Lord Nuffield. This aircraft was due to fly in the MacRobertson Air Race from England to Australia in 1934 but the aircraft was damaged and withdrawn from the race. Another aircraft, a specially modified version with long-range tanks (the AS 8 Viceroy) reached as far as Athens before leaving the race due to damage. A single Envoy participated in the Schlesinger Race to Johannesburg, but crashed midway through, killing two of its crew.

Numerous early airlines adopted the Envoy for their fleets. The British company North Eastern Airways was the first to use the type as an airliner; multiple Envoys were used by the firm, which encountered difficulties on some routes due to limited passenger demand and navigation difficulties, leading to its discontinuation in 1938. The Indian operator Tata Air Service operated a single Envoy on a demonstration flight between Bombay (known as Mumbai today) and Calcutta (since re-spelt as Kolkata) on 25 February 1935 to validate the viability of air mail service between the two cities. Amongst the more successful airlines to operate the Envoy was Japan Air Transport Co. (NKYKK – Nihon Koku Yuso KK) and the Czechoslovak firm Czech Airlines (CSA), the latter having ordered four Envoys to launch its operations with on 1 October 1935.

Orders for the Envoy came from a wide variety of customers, many of which were distributed across the British Empire. A pair of aircraft were delivered to the Ansett Airlines in Australia. The Spanish company Commercial Air Hire acquired one of the early-build Envoys for civilian purposes; it was subsequently impressed into military service along with several Envoys during the Spanish Civil War. Two Envoys were used as the personal aircraft of separate Chinese governors; one of these may have been operated in a military capacity. During May 1937, the King's Flight took delivery of a single Envoy III as a replacement for a de Havilland Dragon Rapide; this aircraft received the registration G-AEXX and was painted in distinctive red and blue colours.

Through the mid to late 1930s, several overseas companies entered negotiations with Airspeed with the aim of acquiring a licence to produce the Envoy themselves. The Japanese company Mitsubishi successfully did so, producing it as the Mitsubishi Hinazuru-type Passenger Transport. The Austrian firm Hirtenberger also secured a licence to locally manufacture the aircraft, while other entities, such as a Yugoslavian venture, also made efforts to secure similar accommodations.

=== Military use ===
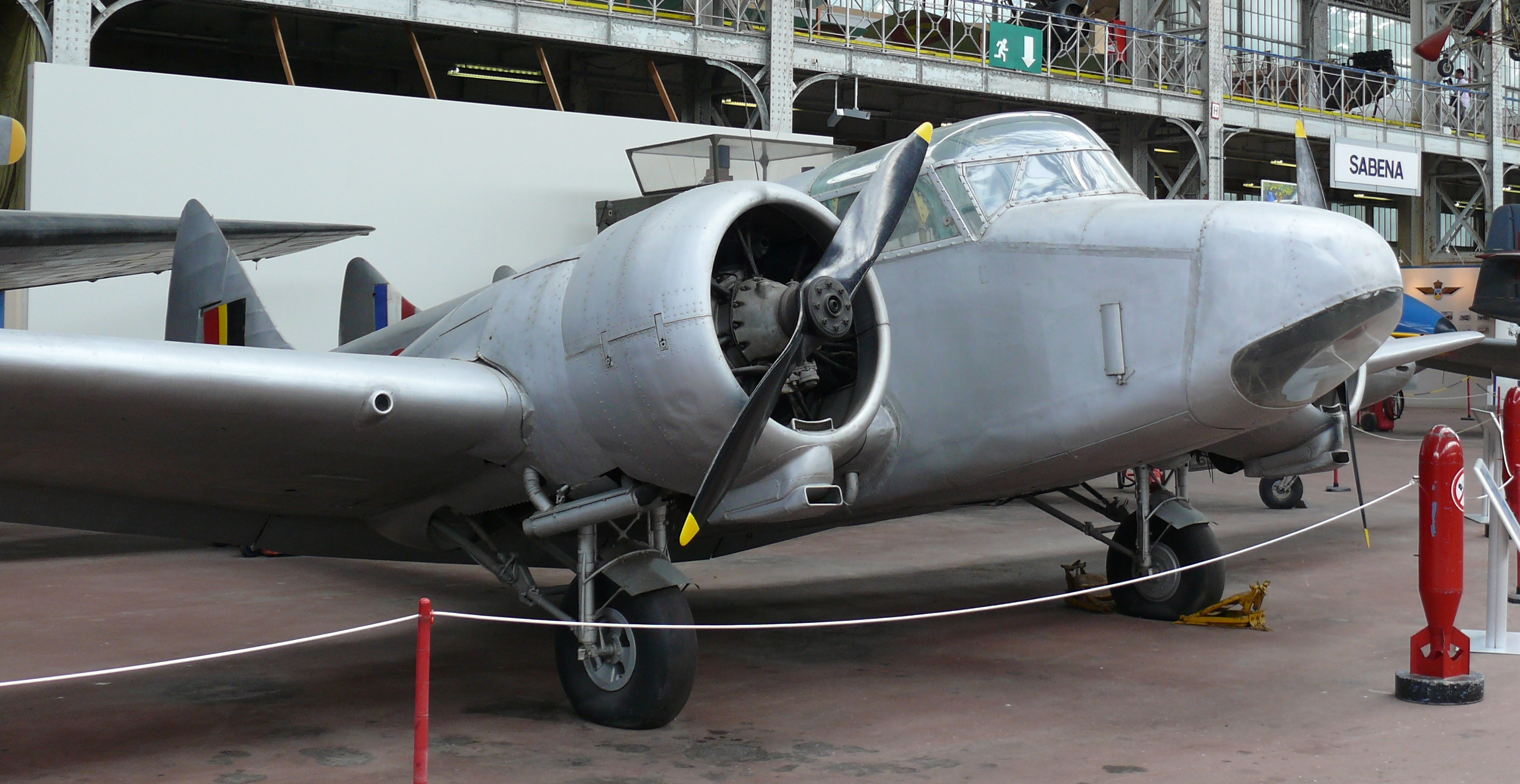
A.S. 10 Oxford, developed from the AS.6 Envoy

The Envoy also saw military use, being adopted by the air arms of different countries. The aircraft was used in quantity by the Air Forces of Spain, Japan, South Africa, Finland, China, and the United Kingdom, along with several additional nations.

Seven Envoys were ordered for joint use by the South African Air Force (SAAF) and South African Airways, with three being delivered in military form and four delivered to South African Airways, where they were used on the air route between Johannesburg – Bloemfontein – Port Elizabeth on 12 October 1936. These aircraft, known as the "Convertible Envoy", could be equipped at short notice with bomb racks and a machinegun in a hand-operated Armstrong Whitworth dorsal turret. Accordingly, each of these seven aircraft could be transformed by a work crew of four within four hours from the transport version into a light bomber or reconnaissance aircraft; in this configuration, the crew consisted of four; pilot, navigator, radio operator and gunner. While not a large order, Airspeed benefitted substantially from its work to develop the Convertible Envoy when it subsequently developed further militarised versions of the aircraft.

The Royal Air Force (RAF) procured a handful of Envoys for communications work both domestically and overseas in the British Raj. During October 1936, the British Air Ministry placed a sizable order for 136 Envoys, specially equipped for crew training, to fulfil Specification T.23/36. These further developed aircraft were given a new company designation as the AS.10, and entered RAF service as the Airspeed Oxford.

During the Spanish Civil War, ten AS.6 Envoys were obtained by the Spanish Republicans, with the Nationalist side using two, including one that defected from the Republicans, as transport, reconnaissance aircraft or light bombers. One of the Nationalist Envoys flew into a mountain in June 1937, killing General Emilio Mola; this Envoy had been their demonstrator and was sold for £6,000 cash (six £1000 Bank of England notes).

During the Second World War, the German Luftwaffe captured several Envoys and operated a few as trainer aircraft for a time.

=== Japan ===
During 1935, a pair of Envoy-Is were delivered to Japan, one for evaluation by the Japan Air Transport Co. (NKYKK – Nihon Koku Yuso KK) and the other for the Imperial Japanese Navy Air Service as the Airspeed LXM. Three months later, a follow-up order was placed four additional Envoys.

Following the acquisition of a licence, local production of the aircraft started at the Nagoya Mitsubishi factory of the Mitsubishi Hinazuru-type Passenger Transport. It was initially powered by Gasuden Jimpu engines, but later using licence built Armstrong Siddeley Lynx or Wolseley Aries Mk.III engines. While largely identical to their British-made equivalents, Mitsubishi-built aircraft differed in that they were outfitted with landing flaps, along with additional supporting frames around the passenger cabin windows and a covering for the transport cockpit canopy. Flight testing of the Jimpu powered aircraft resulted in a crash, killing the flight test observer, (the first fatality during flight testing of Mitsubishi aircraft), blamed on the engines producing excessive drag, resulting in the switch to licence-built British engines. Eleven aircraft were built at Nagoya before production ceased, all of which flew domestic services for NKYKK (later to become Greater Japan Airways).

=== Postwar era ===
By the end of the Second World War, there were very few Envoys left in operation. One of the RAF Envoy IIIs that survived the conflict was subsequently disposed of as surplus and operated by Private Charter Ltd as G-AHAC for civil passenger charter flights, it was retired and finally scrapped at Tollerton airport, Nottingham during 1950.

== Variants ==
AS.6 Envoy I
Powered by two 200-hp (149-kW) Wolseley A.R.9 piston engines. 5 built
AS.6A Envoy I
Powered by two 240-hp (179-kW) Armstrong Siddeley Lynx IVC radial piston engines. 5 built
AS.6D Envoy II
Powered by two 350-hp (261-kW) Wright R-760-E2 Whirlwind 7 radial piston engines, eight built.
AS.6E Envoy III
Powered by two 340-hp (254-kW) Walter Castor engines. 5 built
AS.6G
Powered by two 250-hp (186-kW) Wolseley Scorpio I engines.
AS.6H Envoy
Powered by two 225-hp (168-kW) Wolseley Aries III engines. 1 built
AS.6J Envoy III
Seven-seat light transport aircraft. Powered by two 345-hp (257-kW) Armstrong Siddeley Cheetah IX radial piston engines. 27 built
AS.6JC Envoy
Powered by two 350-hp (261-kW) Armstrong Siddeley Cheetah IX radial piston engines. 4 built
AS.6JM Envoy
Powered by two 350-hp (261-kW) Armstrong Siddeley Cheetah IX radial piston engines. 3 built
AS.6K Envoy III
Three-built.
AS.8 Viceroy
A special, one-off racer developed for the MacRobertson Race from the Envoy.
Airspeed LXM
One Envoy evaluated by the Imperial Japanese Navy Air Service
Mitsubishi Hinazuru-type Passenger Transport
(Hinazuru – en Young Crane) Licence production by Mitsubishi, fitted with flaps and powered by Gasuden Jimpu, or licence-built Armstrong Siddeley Lynx or Wolseley Aries Mk.III engines. Eleven built from 1936 to 1938

== Operators ==
The Envoy also saw service in China, the Independent State of Croatia, Finland, Slovakia, and Spain.

Australia

- Ansett Airlines

Croatia

- Air Force of the Independent State of Croatia

Czechoslovakia

- ČSA

Finland

- Finnish Air Force

Germany

- Luftwaffe (small numbers)

Japan

- Japan Air Transport
- Imperial Japan Airways

Manchukuo

- Manchukuo National Airways

South Africa

- South African Airways operated four aircraft.
- South African Air Force

Spain

- Spanish Republican Air Force from LAPE

Spain

- Spanish Air Force

United Kingdom

- North Eastern Airways
- Olley Air Service
- Portsmouth, Southsea and Isle of Wight Aviation
- Private Charter Ltd
- Royal Air Force
  - No. 24 Squadron RAF.
  - No. 17 Group Communication Flight RAF
- Fleet Air Arm

== Accidents and incidents ==
Cheetah-powered Envoy, VH-UXY, piloted by Charles Ulm, disappeared in December 1934 during an attempt to fly the Pacific route between Oakland and Honolulu. It had been specially built with a large long-range fuel tank filling the middle of the cabin.

Maxwell Findlay fatally crashed another Envoy, modified with long-range fuel tanks, in northern Rhodesia during the October 1936 Portsmouth to Johannesburg Schlesinger African Air Race. They were to use a Viceroy purchased for £5500; but when offered £9500 (the cost of the plane plus the first prize of £4000) by a Spanish (war) buyer they cashed the cheque and ordered a Cheetah-engine Envoy with long range tanks which had similar performance to the Viceroy. But at Abercorn in Africa they could not wait for the wind to drop so they could take off downhill. They took off with maximum load uphill against the wind but failed to clear trees beyond the strip and crashed.

The Envoy prototype (demonstrator) was sold to the Spanish Nationalists for £6000 cash (six £1000 Bank of England notes) in September 1936 and used as a VIP transport. On 3 June 1937 it flew into a mountain killing all on board including General Mola.

== Specifications (AS.6J Series III ) ==
Data from Airspeed Aircraft since 1931

General characteristics

- Crew: 1 pilot
- Capacity: 6 passengers
- Length: 34 ft 6 in (10.52 m)
- Wingspan: 52 ft 4 in (15.95 m)
- Height: 9 ft 6 in (2.90 m)
- Wing area: 339 sq ft (31.5 m^{2})
- Empty weight: 4,057 lb (1,840 kg)
- Gross weight: 6,300 lb (2,858 kg)
- Powerplant: 2 × Armstrong Siddeley Cheetah IX seven-cylinder radial engine, 345 hp (257 kW) each

Performance

- Maximum speed: 210 mph (340 km/h, 180 kn) at 7,300 ft (2,230 m)
- Cruise speed: 192 mph (309 km/h, 167 kn) at 75% power and 7,300 ft (2,230 m)
- Range: 650 mi (1,050 km, 560 nmi) at 62.5% power and 10,000 ft (3,050 m)
- Service ceiling: 22,500 ft (6,900 m) service
- Time to altitude: to 10,000 ft (3,050 m), 8 min
- Wing loading: 18.6 lb/sq ft (91 kg/m^{2})
- Power/mass: 0.11 hp/lb (0.18 kW/kg)

== See also ==
Related lists

- List of aircraft of World War II
- List of aircraft of the RAF
