= Saro Cloud =

A.19 Cloud
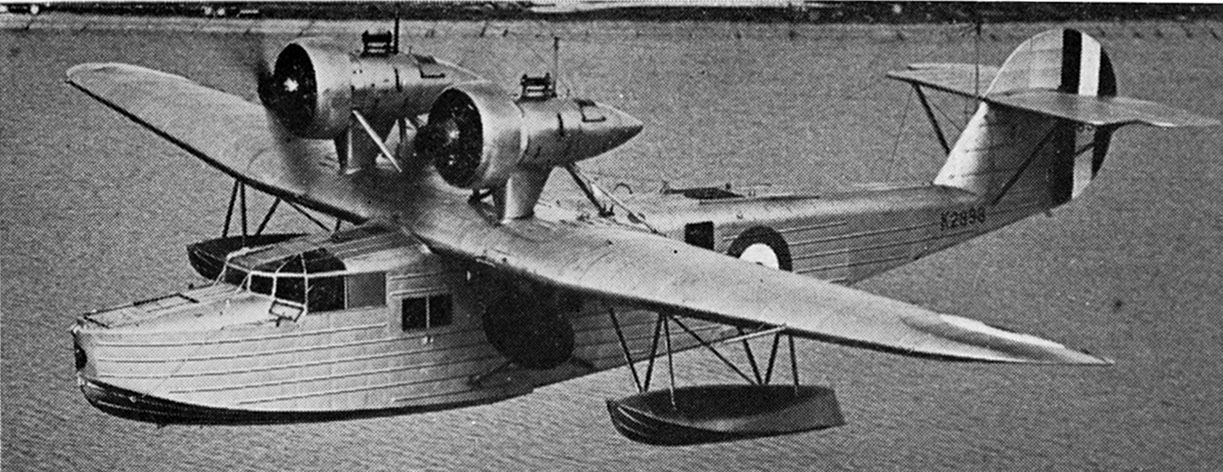
- A Saro Cloud of the Royal Air Force

General information
- Type: Flying boat
- Manufacturer: Saunders-Roe
- Primary user: Royal Air Force
- Number built: 22

History
- First flight: 15 July 1930

The Saro Cloud was a British passenger amphibian flying boat designed and built by Saunders-Roe as the A.19. It was later produced as the A.29 for the Royal Air Force for pilot and navigator training.

== Development ==
Following the success of the A.17 Cutty Sark, the company designed an enlarged version designated the A.19 Cloud. It had room for a crew of two and eight passengers. Like the Cutty Sark, it was a twin-engined monoplane flying boat with the engines mounted above the wing. This facilitated the use of different engines, and four aircraft were sold to private operators with a variety of engines.

First flown on 15 July 1930, the prototype was fitted with two 300 hp (224 kW) Wright J-6 radial engines.

The Air Ministry ordered one aircraft for evaluation as a trainer, powered by a pair of Armstrong Siddely Double Mongoose radial engines. After evaluation, the Air Ministry ordered a total of sixteen aircraft (in three batches) to Air Ministry Specification 15/32for pilot and navigator training. Designated the A.29, it had room for six students. It had provision for gun mountings in the bow and aft compartments, and could also carry four 50 lb practice bombs.

== Operational history ==
The first production A.29 Cloud was delivered to the Marine Aircraft Experimental Establishment for test and evaluation. Following modifications to the hull and steps, the aircraft was delivered to the Seaplane Training Squadron at RAF Calshot in August 1933. During its career, the Cloud served as training aircraft for both pilots, destined to train on larger flying boats after graduating from the Cloud before being assigned to frontline RAF flying boat units, and for navigators, as the cabin was large enough to house several map tables. The final Cloud was delivered to the RAF in 1935, and after a few years' service as trainers, the last operational aircraft were withdrawn from service in July 1939.

== Variants ==
A.19/1
Prototype registered G-ABCJ with 300 hp (224 kW) Wright J-6 radial engines, sold in Canada as CF-ARB, but returned to Saro in 1934 for use as an engine test bed. It was fitted with 340 hp Napier Rapier IV engines and an auxiliary aerofoil behind and below the engine nacelles. It was loaned to Jersey Airways in 1935 before being withdrawn from use in 1936.
A.19/2
Special variant powered by three 215 hp Armstrong Siddeley Lynx IVC engines and registered G-ABHG. Due to problems with the engine installation it was re-engined with two 425 hp (317 kW) Pratt & Whitney Wasp C radials before delivery. It was also fitted with an auxiliary aerofoil above the engines and twin fins and rudders to improve directional control. Sold to Imperial Airways in 1940 as a crew trainer but damaged beyond repair in 1941 and scrapped.
A.19/3
Prototype for the Air Ministry with serial K2681, and powered by two 340 hp (254 kW) Armstrong Siddeley Serval III radials. Following evaluation, sixteen production aircraft, designated A.29 were ordered.
A.19/4
Registered G-ABXW with 300 hp (224 kW) Wright J-6 radial engines. Named 'Cloud of Iona'. It was operated by British Flying Boats Ltd for joy-riding and charter flights, and briefly trialled a service between Glasgow and Belfast. In 1935 it was operated by Spartan Air Lines, and later used by Guernsey Airways until lost off Jersey on 31 July 1936.
A.19/5

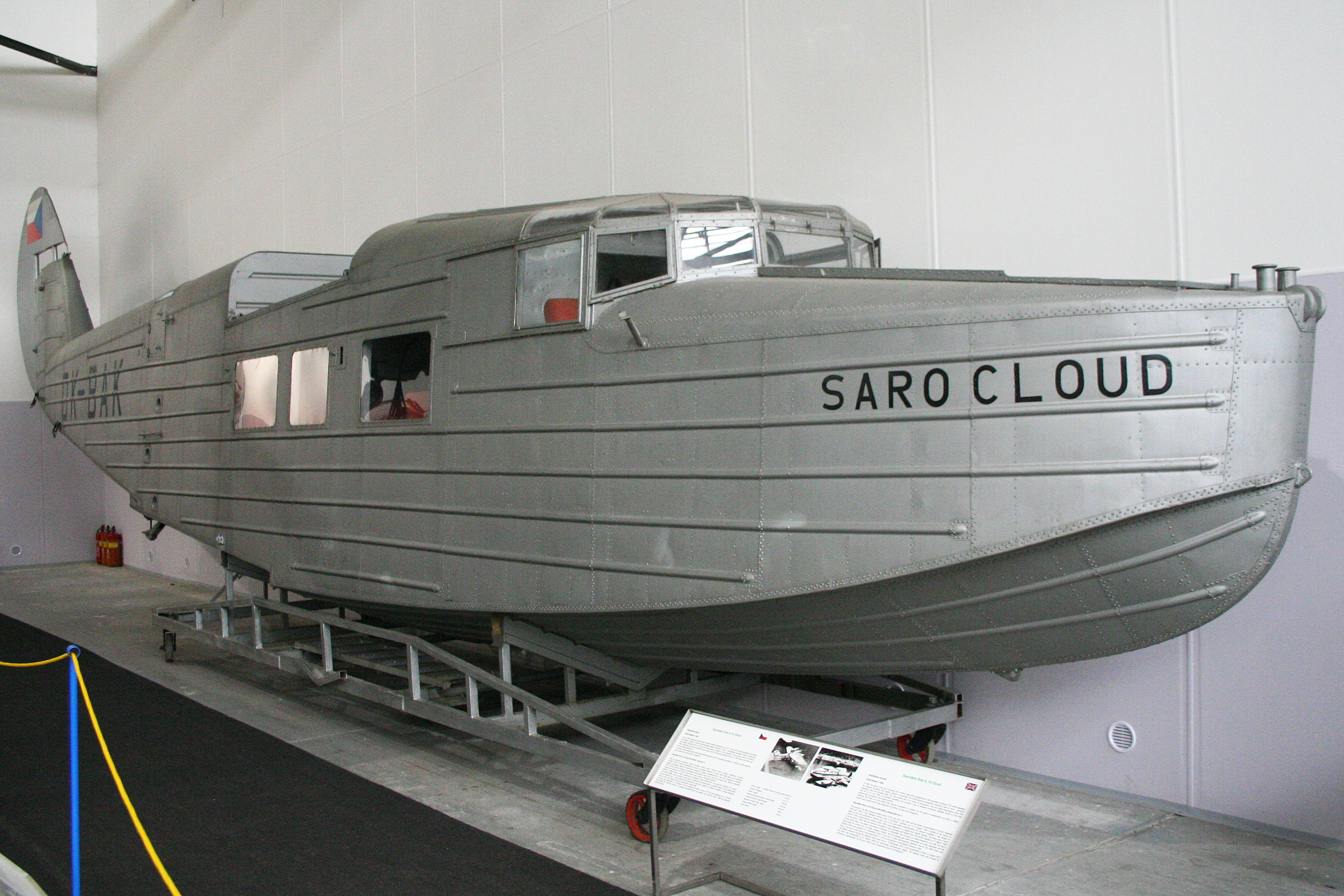
Saro A.19 Cloud OK-BAK at Kbely Aviation Museum

Powered by two Armstrong Siddeley Serval IIIs, and registered G-ACGO. First flown in 1933, it went on a sales tour of Europe, and was sold to the Czechoslovak State Airline as OK-BAK, and re-engined with Walter Pollux radials. In the 1950s, it was converted to a motorboat Delfin on the Vltava. In 1995, the boat was re-converted to a flying boat, with the tail and upper hull restored, but no wing. This fuselage is now at the Kbely Aviation Museum, Prague.
Monospar ST-7
The Air Ministry's evaluation A.19 K2681 was fitted with an experimental Monospar mainplane under specification 18/32, to evaluate the use of the wing on future Saro designs. The modified aircraft flew in 1934, and was used to help in the development of the Saro A.33.

A.29
Armstrong Siddeley Serval III powered navigation trainers for the Royal Air Force, 16 built.

== Operators ==
=== Civil operators ===
Private individuals in Canada and the United Kingdom and the following commercial operators:

Czechoslovakia

- Czechoslovak State Airline

United Kingdom

- British Flying Boats
- Guernsey Airways
- Imperial Airways
- Jersey Airways
- Spartan Air Lines

=== Military operators ===
United Kingdom

- Royal Air Force
  - No. 48 Squadron RAF part of the School of Air Navigation, RAF Manston
  - No. 9 Elementary and Reserve Flying Training School (RAF Ansty)
  - Air Observers School
  - School of Air Pilotage (RAF Andover)
  - School of Naval Co-operation (RAF Calshot)
  - Seaplane Training Squadron (RAF Calshot)

== Specifications (A.29 Cloud) ==
Data from The Illustrated Encyclopedia of Aircraft (Part Work 1982–1985). Orbis Publishing. p. 2879.

General characteristics

- Crew: two pilots
- Capacity: 4 to 8 trainees depending upon role
- Length: 50 ft 11.5 in (15.532 m)
- Wingspan: 64 ft (20 m)
- Height: 16 ft 5 in (5.00 m)
- Wing area: 650 sq ft (60 m^{2})
- Empty weight: 6,800 lb (3,084 kg)
- Gross weight: 9,500 lb (4,309 kg)
- Powerplant: 2 × Armstrong Siddeley Serval III or Serval V 10-cylinder air-cooled radial piston engine2, 340 hp (250 kW) each
- Propellers: 2-bladed fixed-pitch propellers

Performance

- Maximum speed: 118 mph (190 km/h, 103 kn)
- Range: 380 mi (610 km, 330 nmi)
- Endurance: 4 hours
- Service ceiling: 14,000 ft (4,300 m)
- Rate of climb: 750 ft/min (3.8 m/s)

Armament

- Guns: Provision for 0.303 in (7.7 mm) Lewis machine guns in bow and rear positions
- Bombs: 4 x 50lb (22.7kg) practice bombs

== Accidents and incidents ==
On 31 July 1936 G-ABXW was lost during a flight between Guernsey and Jersey. All ten on board were killed.

== See also ==
Related lists

- List of aircraft of the Royal Air Force
- List of flying boats and floatplanes
