= Armstrong Siddeley Mongoose =

1920s British piston aircraft engine

Mongoose
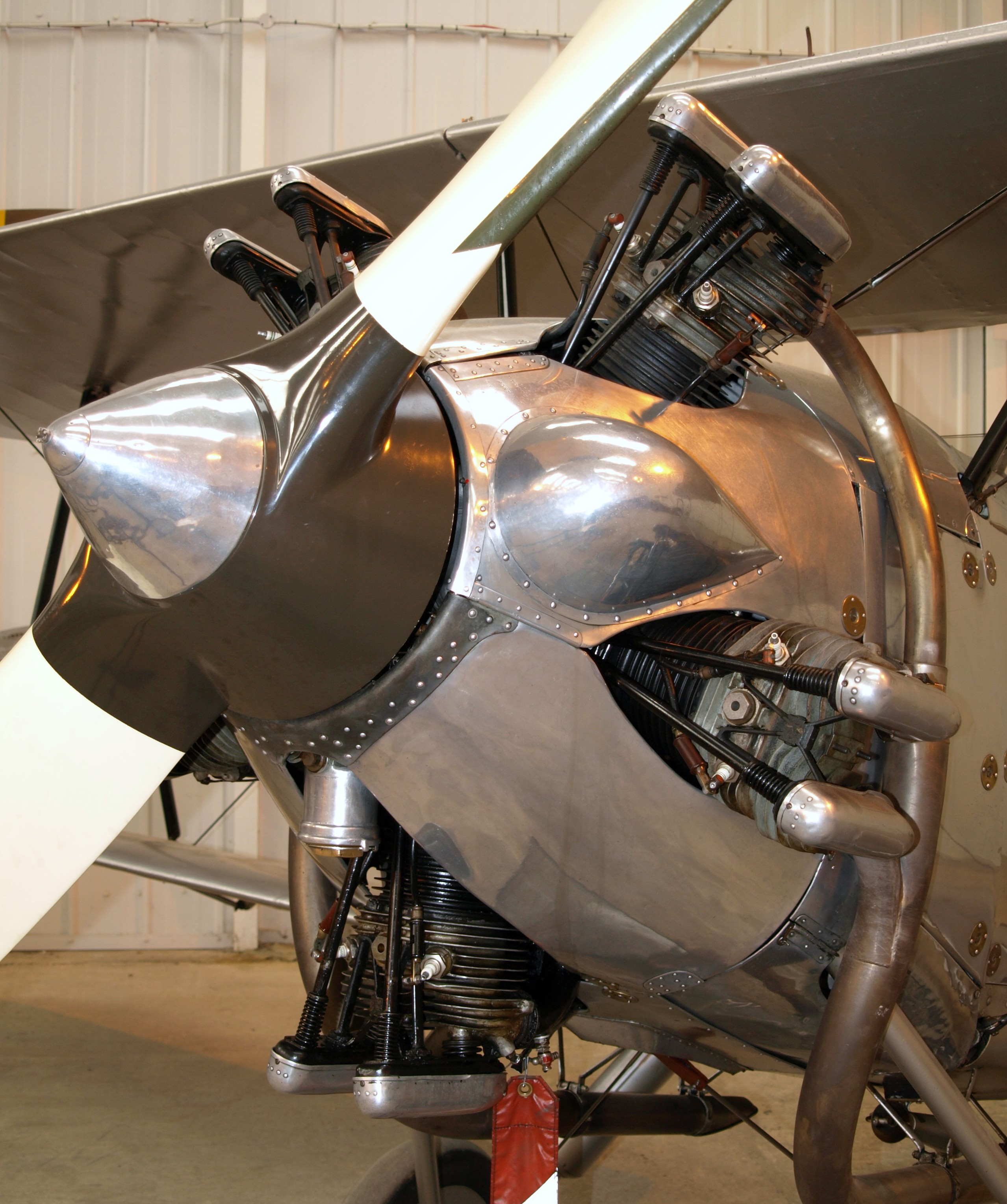
- Armstrong Siddeley Mongoose fitted to the Shuttleworth Collection's airworthy Hawker Tomtit
- Type: Radial engine
- National origin: United Kingdom
- Manufacturer: Armstrong Siddeley
- First run: 1926
- Major applications: Hawker Tomtit; Avro 504N
- Developed into: Armstrong Siddeley Serval

The Armstrong Siddeley Mongoose is a British five-cylinder radial aero engine produced by Armstrong Siddeley. Developed in the mid-1920s it was used in the Hawker Tomtit trainer and Parnall Peto seaplane amongst others. With a displacement of 540 cubic inches (9 litres) the Mongoose had a maximum power output of 155 horsepower (115 kilowatts).

A Mongoose engine powers the sole remaining airworthy Hawker Tomtit, based at Old Warden.

== Design and development ==
The Mongoose is a five-cylinder, single-row, air-cooled radial piston engine. The engine features twin forward-mounted ignition magnetos and enclosed valve rockers, the cylinders being the same as those used for the earlier Jaguar engine. An unusual feature of the Mongoose is the vertical position of the lower cylinder, a design thought likely to promote oil fouling of the spark plugs.

Built in several variants, power output ranged between 135 and 155 hp (100-115 kW).

== Variants ==
Mongoose I
1926, 135 hp.
Mongoose II
1930, 155 hp.
Mongoose III
1929.
Mongoose IIIA
1929, civil use.
Mongoose IIIC
1929, Military use based on IIIA.

== Applications ==
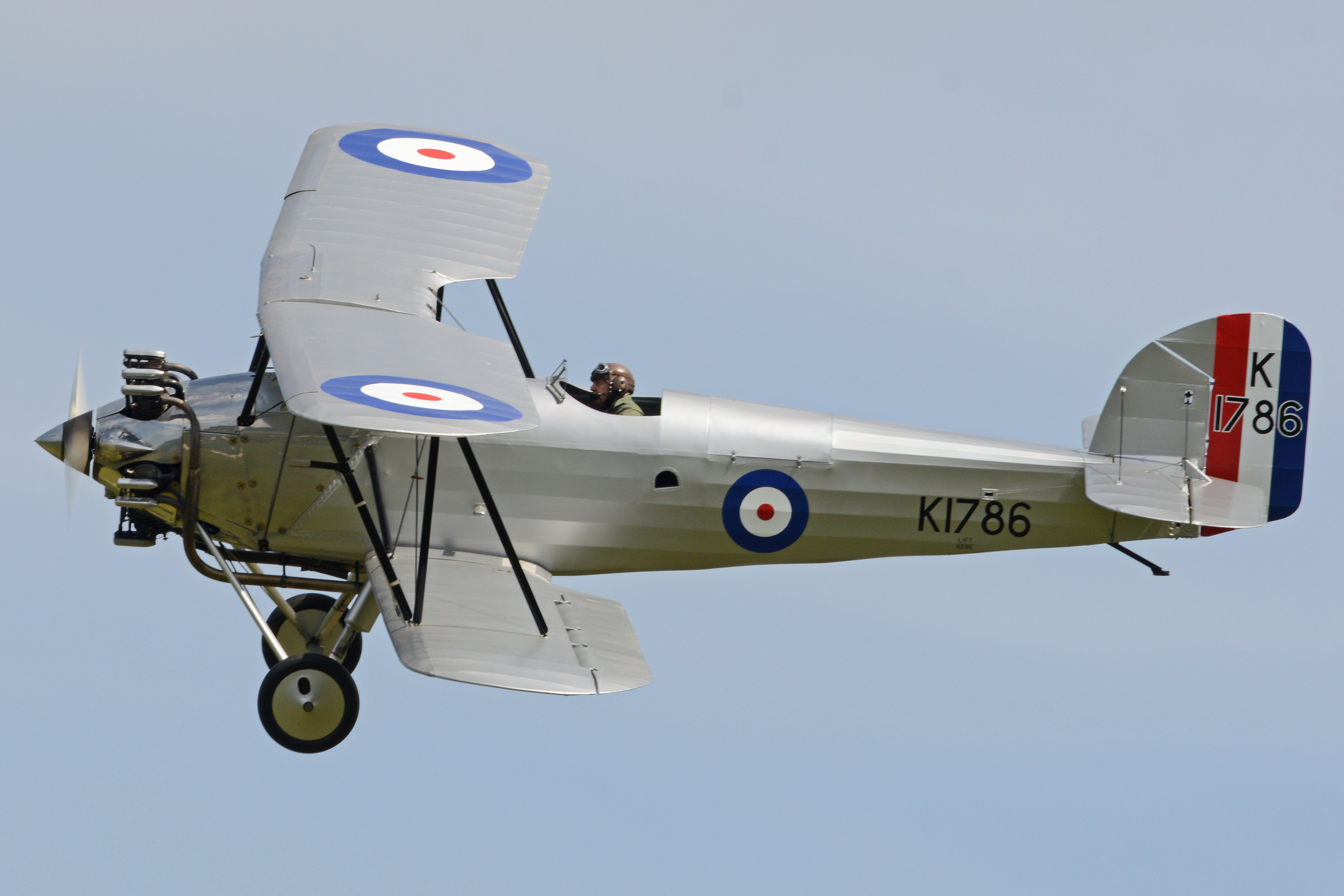
Mongoose-powered Hawker Tomtit

Note:

- ANBO III (Second batch, 1931)
- Avro 504N
- Avro 504R
- Avro Tutor
- Avro Type 621 Trainer
- Handley Page Hamlet
- Handley Page Gugnunc
- Hawker Tomtit
- Parnall Peto
- Fokker S.IV

== Surviving engines ==
An Armstrong Siddeley Mongoose IIIC powers the sole remaining airworthy Hawker Tomtit, K1786/G-AFTA, owned and operated by the Shuttleworth Collection this aircraft flies regularly throughout the summer months.

== Specifications (Mongoose I) ==
Data from Lumsden.

=== General characteristics ===
- Type: 5-cylinder single-row radial
- Bore: 5 in (127 mm)
- Stroke: 5.5 in (139.7 mm)
- Displacement: 540 cu in (8.8 L)
- Length: 36.6 in (93 cm)
- Diameter: 45.6 in (116 cm)
- Dry weight: 340 lb (154 kg)

=== Components ===
- Valvetrain: Overhead poppet valves
- Fuel type: 77 Octane petrol
- Cooling system: Air-cooled
- Reduction gear: Direct drive, left-hand tractor

=== Performance ===
- Power output: 138 hp (103 kW) at 1,750 rpm at sea level
- Compression ratio: 5:1
- Power-to-weight ratio: 0.4 hp/lb (0.67 kW/kg)

== See also ==
Related development

- Armstrong Siddeley Serval

Comparable engines

- Kinner R-5
- Shvetsov M-11
- Wright R-540

Related lists

- List of aircraft engines
