= Blind flying panel =

Aircraft instrument

A blind flying panel is an instrumentation sub-panel located in the cockpit of an aircraft. Its purpose was to present the necessary information to pilots for flying under instrument flight rules (IFR); it would be used in circumstances where visual flight rules (VFR) would not be desirable or possible, such as during night time or unclear weather conditions. The blind flying panel was prevalently used during the Second World War upon a wide range of aircraft, from fighters such as the Supermarine Spitfire, to bombers and trainers alike. In the postwar era, it decreased in relevance following the increasing prevalence of onboard radar sets and other newer navigational aids.

== Description ==
A blind flying panel has typically, but not necessarily, features an arrangement of six key flight instruments: an airspeed indicator (ASI), an artificial horizon, an altimeter, a rate of climb indicator, a directional gyro, and a turn and slip indicator. All of the blind flying panel's instruments were either pitot/static-powered or vacuum powered, the latter being driven via a vacuum pump fitted onto (at least one of) the aircraft's engines, thus making the instruments independent of the electrical supply. However, some aircraft featured dimmable electrical lighting for illuminating these instruments. The blind flying panel was usually mounted away from the main panel, typically on an arrangement of three rubber suspension points.

Around the time of the Second World War, the blind flying panel was a standardised piece of cockpit equipment that was installed on the majority of aircraft operated by the Royal Air Force, to the point where it was considered to be a part of the typical British cockpit. The majority of fighter aircraft that participated in the Battle of Britain, including the Hawker Hurricane and Supermarine Spitfire, were so provisioned, as were numerous other aircraft, even trainers. Biplanes in British service, such as the Fairey Swordfish torpedo bomber, often featured blind instrument panels on later-built examples despite otherwise relatively spartan cockpits become commonplace.

In contrast, the Messerschmitt Bf 109 operated by the Luftwaffe were not furnished with blind flying panels. The United States developed its own standardised blind flying panel during the conflict, fitting it to several fighters, such as the Grumman F6F Hellcat. However, numerous American fighters, typically those built early on in the conflict such as the Bell P-39 Airacobra and the Curtiss P-40 Warhawk, lacked any such provision. Numerous early postwar era aircraft, such as the de Havilland Comet, the world's first jetliner, had blind flying panels amongst their navigational instrumentation.

During the 1950s, some analysts concluded that the standard blind flying panel was increasingly unable to meet special operational requirements, such as the need for pilots to view radar imagery, particularly in the night fighter role in which the panel had been once prolifically used in. Around this time, research was underway to developing methods of flying under IFR conditions without relying on gyroscopes or some of the traditional means of instrumentation. Nonetheless, the blind flying panel continued to be used by operational aircraft for quite some time, In addition to being subject to numerous studies and comparisons drawn with newer instrumentation designs.
